= Classical music of the United States =

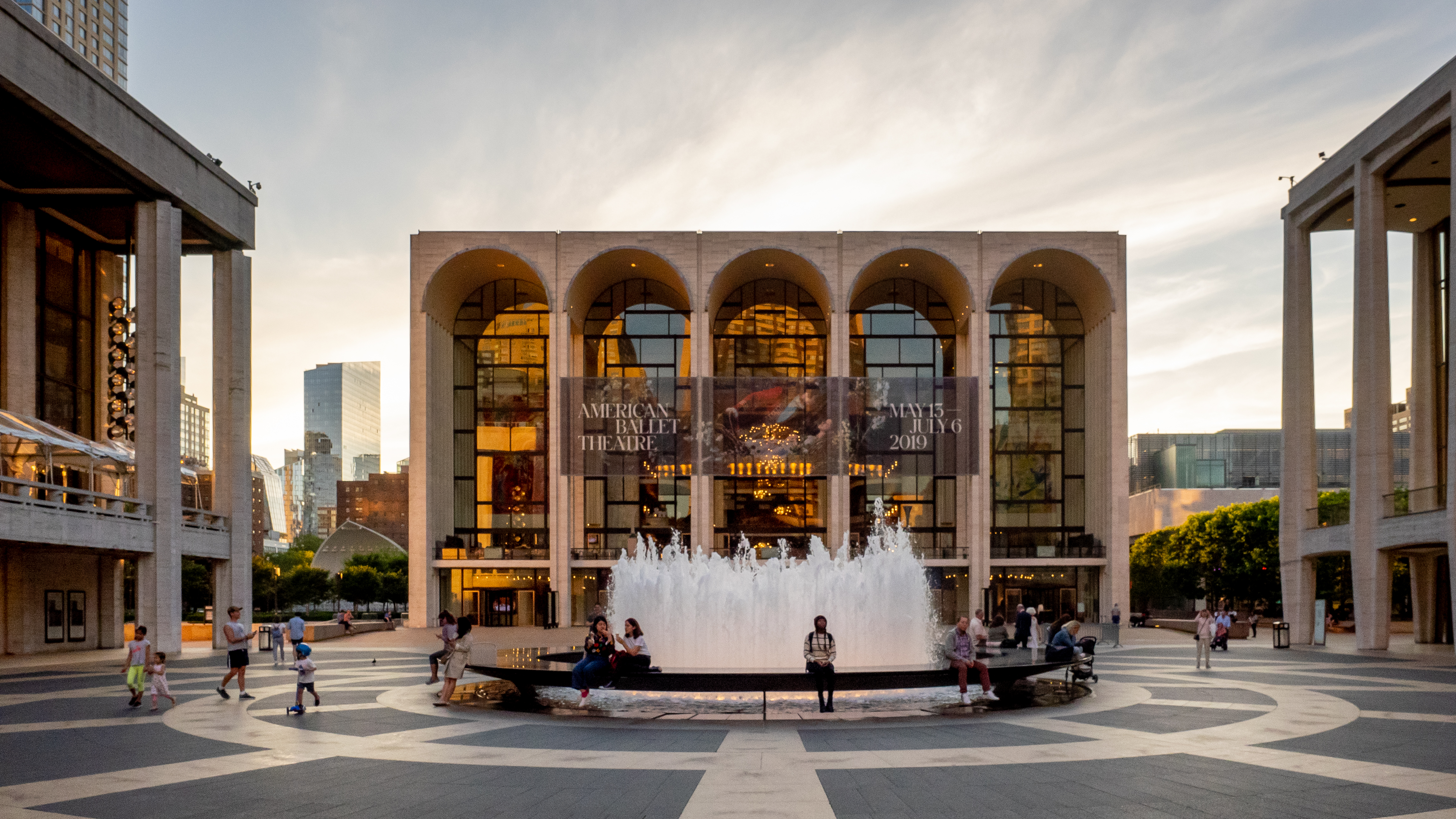
The Lincoln Center houses nationally and internationally renowned performing arts organizations including the New York Philharmonic, the Metropolitan Opera, and the New York City Ballet. Juilliard School of Music also became part of the Lincoln Center complex.

American classical music is music written in the United States in the classical music tradition, which originated in Europe. In many cases, beginning in the 18th century, it has been influenced by American folk music styles; and from the 20th century to the present day it has often been influenced by American folk music and sometimes jazz.

== Beginnings ==
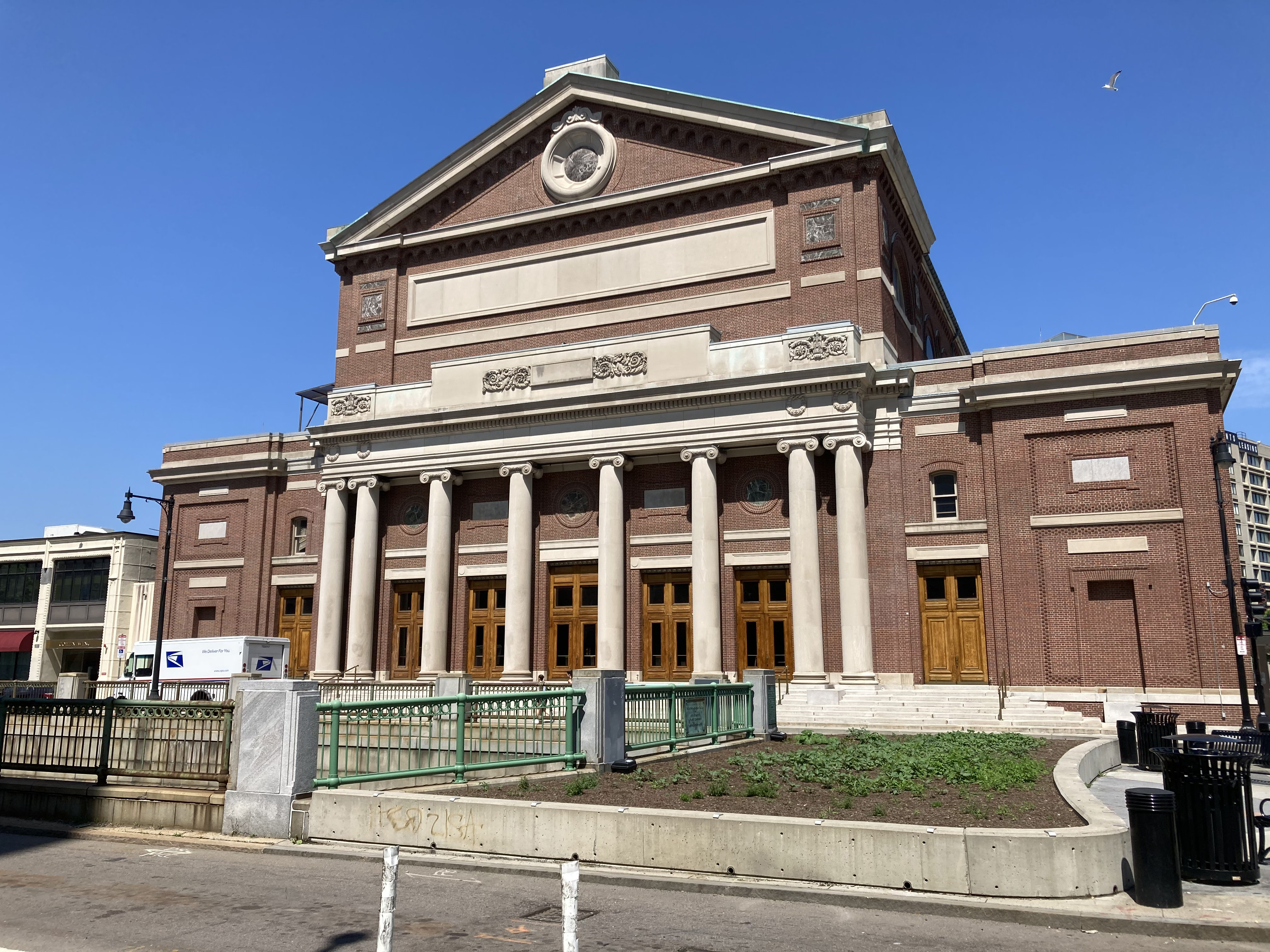
Symphony Hall, Boston, the main base of the orchestra since 1900

The earliest American classical music consists of part-songs used in religious services during Colonial times. The first music of this type in America were the psalm books, such as the Ainsworth Psalter, brought over from Europe by the settlers of the Massachusetts Bay Colony. The first music publication in English-speaking North America – indeed the first publication of any kind – was the Bay Psalm Book of 1640.

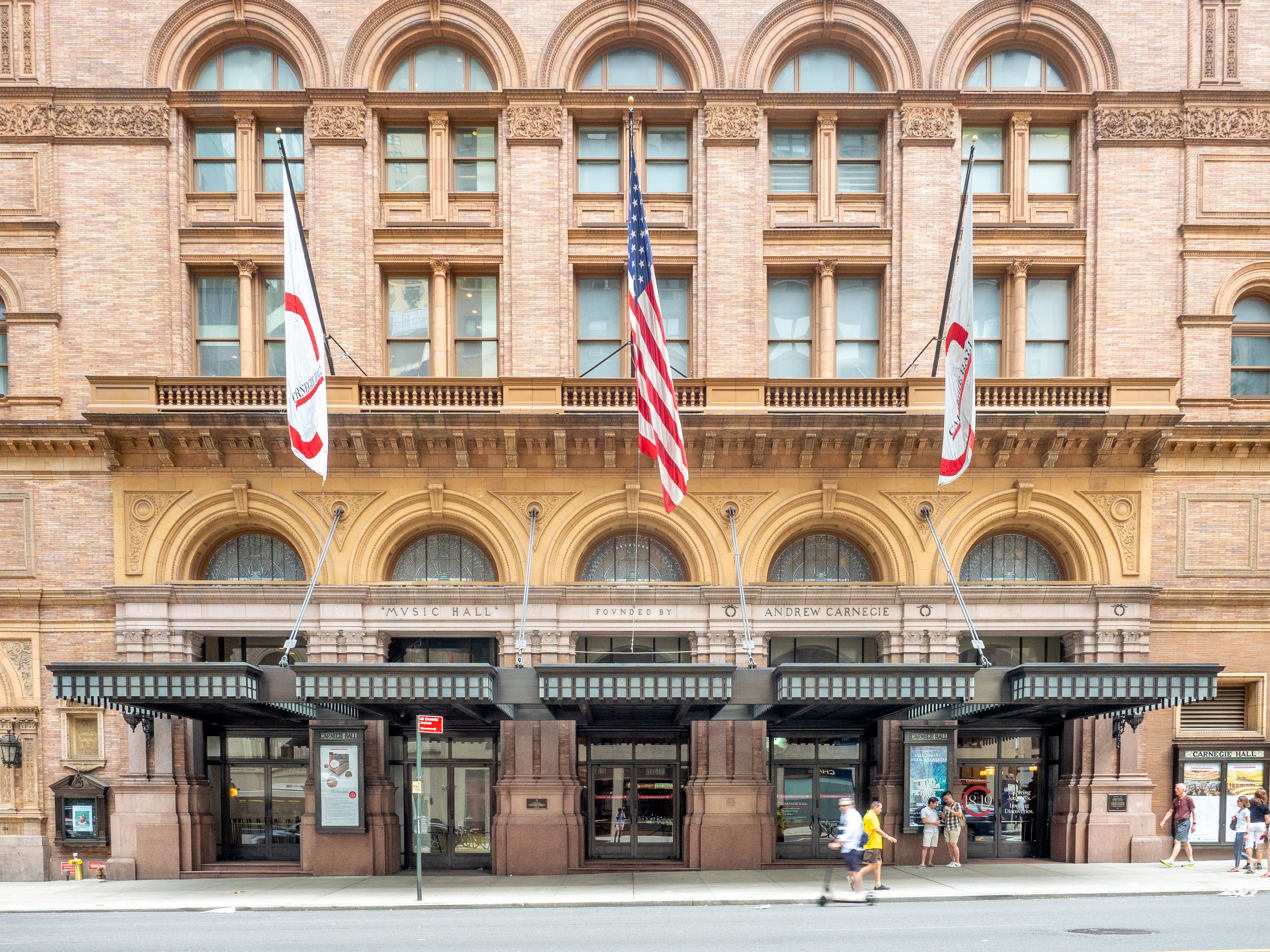
Carnegie Hall is one of the most prestigious venues in the world for both classical music and popular music.

Many American composers of this period worked (like Benjamin West and the young Samuel Morse in painting) exclusively with European models, while others, such as William Billings, Supply Belcher, Daniel Read, Oliver Holden, Justin Morgan, Andrew Law, Timothy Swan, Jacob Kimball Jr., Jeremiah Ingalls, and John Wyeth, also known as the First New England School or Yankee tunesmiths, developed a native style almost entirely independent of the most prestigious European models, though it drew on the practice of West Gallery music composers such as William Tans'ur and Aaron Williams. Many of these composers were amateurs, and many were singers: they developed new forms of sacred music, such as the fuguing tune, suitable for performance by amateurs, and often using harmonic methods which would have been considered bizarre by contemporary European standards. Some of the most unusual innovators were composers such as Anthony Philip Heinrich, who received some formal instrumental training but were entirely self-taught in composition. Heinrich traveled extensively throughout the interior of the young United States in the early 19th century, recording his experiences with colorful orchestral and chamber music which had almost nothing in common with the music being composed in Europe. Heinrich was the first American composer to write for symphony orchestra, as well as the first to conduct a Beethoven symphony in the United States (in Lexington, Kentucky in 1817).

Because the United States is made up of many states, some of which were parts of other empires, the classical music of the nation has derived from those empires respectively. The earliest classical music in what is now California, and other former Spanish colonies, was the renaissance polyphony of Spain. This sacred classical music was provided to support the liturgy of the Catholic Church.

Other early American composers include: William Selby, Victor Pelissier, John Christopher Moller, Alexander Reinagle, Benjamin Carr, William Brown, James Hewitt, Mr. Newman (Three Sonatas, for the piano forte or harpsichord, New York 1807).

== Second New England School ==
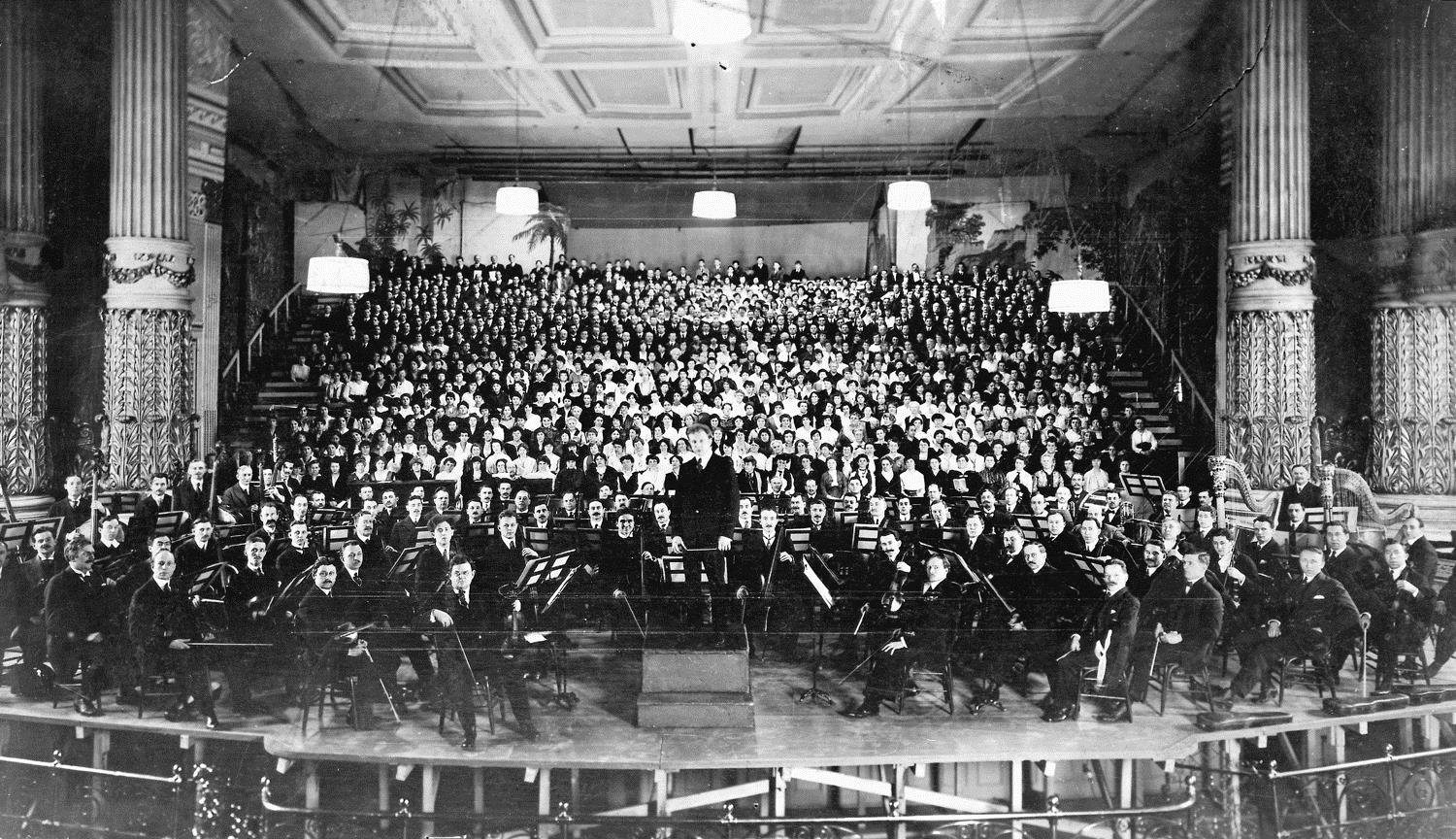
The Philadelphia Orchestra on stage with Stokowski for the American premiere of Mahler's Eighth Symphony, March 2, 1916

During the mid to late 19th century, a vigorous tradition of home-grown classical music developed, especially in New England. Academics view this development as pivotal in the history of American classical music because it established the characteristics that set it apart from its European ancestors. This initiative was driven by musicians who wanted to produce American indigenous music. John Knowles Paine is recognized as the leader of this group.

The composers of the Second New England School included Paine's colleagues and students such as George Whitefield Chadwick, Amy Beach, Edward MacDowell, Arthur Foote, and Horatio Parker, who was the teacher of Charles Ives. Together with Paine, the group was also known as the Boston Six. Many of these composers went to Europe – especially Germany – to study, but returned to the United States to compose, perform, and acquire students. Some of their stylistic descendants include 20th-century composers such as Howard Hanson, Walter Piston, and Roger Sessions. Ives was considered the last of the Second New England School composers although his music is viewed by some as one that still drew influence from European tradition mixed with modernism.

== 20th century ==
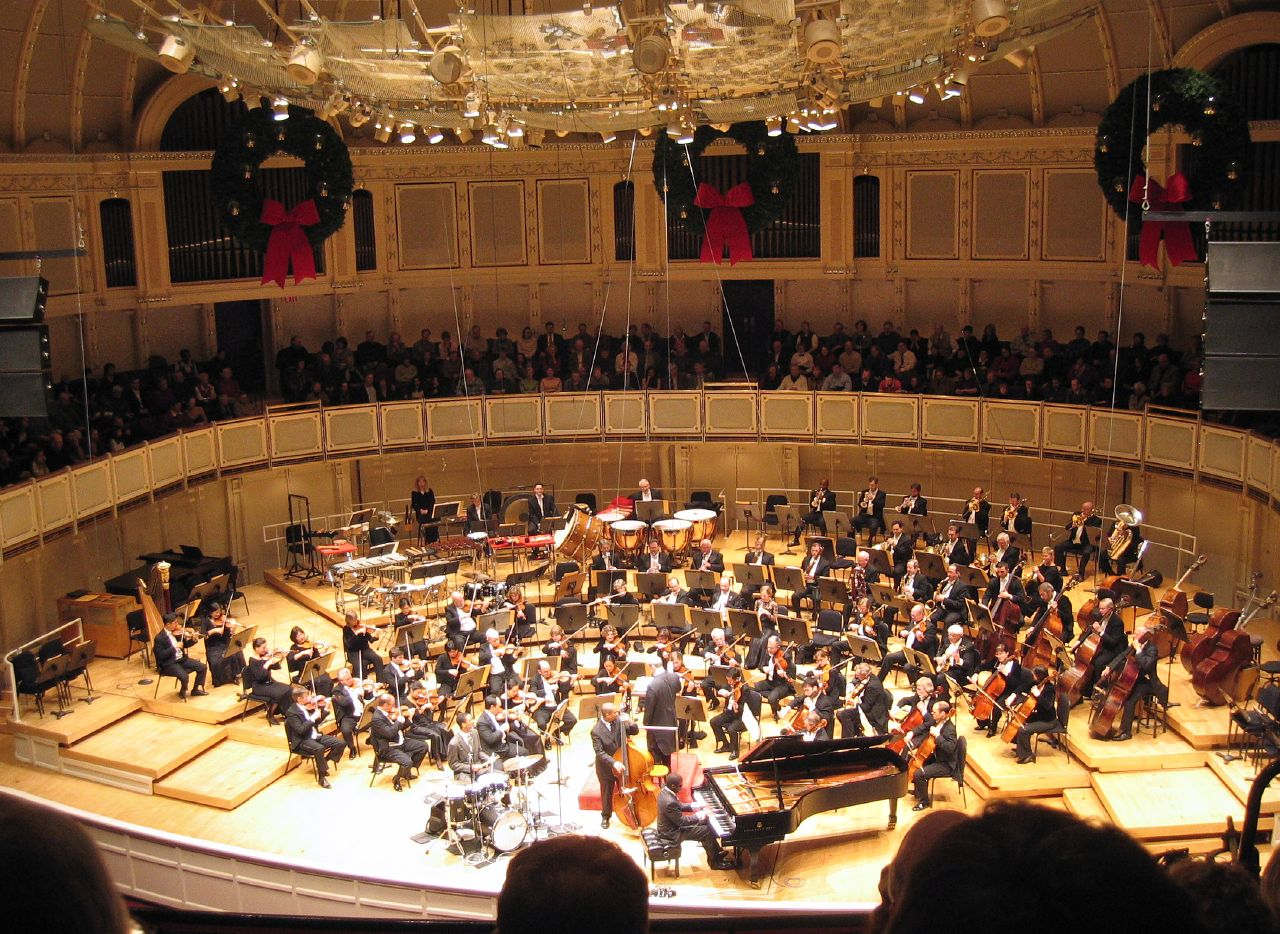
The Orchestra performs in Orchestra Hall at the Chicago Symphony Center.

In the early 20th century, George Gershwin was greatly influenced by African American music. He created a convincing synthesis of music from several traditions. Similarly inclined was Leonard Bernstein, who at times mixed non-tonal music with Jazz in his classical compositions. Leroy Anderson, Ferde Grofe, Morton Gould, and William Grant Still also composed pieces in the "symphonic jazz" vein. Florence Price often used elements of African American spiritual music to compose pieces in the European classical tradition.

Many of the major classical composers of the 20th century were influenced by folk traditions, none more quintessentially, perhaps, than Charles Ives or Aaron Copland. Other composers adopted features of folk music, from the Appalachians, the plains and elsewhere, including Roy Harris, Elmer Bernstein, David Diamond, Elie Siegmeister, and others. Yet other early to mid-20th-century composers continued in the more experimental traditions, including such figures as Charles Ives, George Antheil, and Henry Cowell. Others, such as Samuel Barber, captured a period of Americana in such pieces as Knoxville: Summer of 1915.

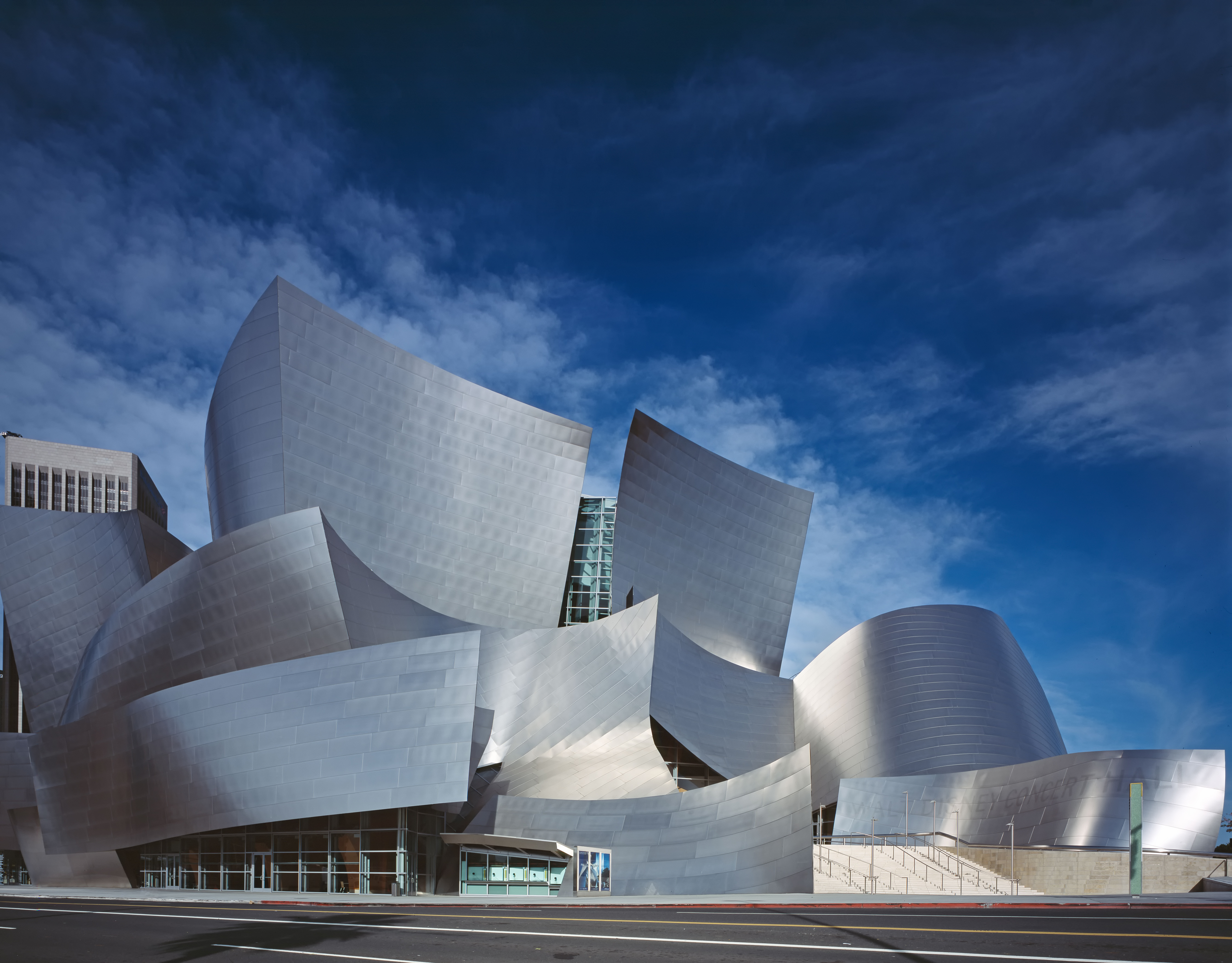
The Walt Disney Concert Hall, home to the Los Angeles Philharmonic, features an acoustically superior auditorium paneled in hardwood.

The 20th century also saw important works published by such significant immigrant composers as Igor Stravinsky and Arnold Schoenberg, who came to America for a variety of reasons, including political persecution, aesthetic freedom and economic opportunity.

Minimalism is a musical movement that started in the early 1960s in New York City. Composers such as Philip Glass, Steve Reich, and John Adams used experimental composition techniques such as drones, phasing, repeated motifs, sharp contrasts between mixed meters, simple but often abrupt movements between minor and major chords with the same root, contrasts between tonality and atonality, and a large amount of use of synthesizers to display the interplay of the fundamental building blocks of music: the cancellation and amplification of wavelengths that make up all acoustic and synthesized sound.As is often the case in art, the rise of American minimalism in music paralleled the rise of minimalism as an artistic style, which used the contrast of black and white, the gradual movement of shading with gradients, and also often repeated concepts and themes.

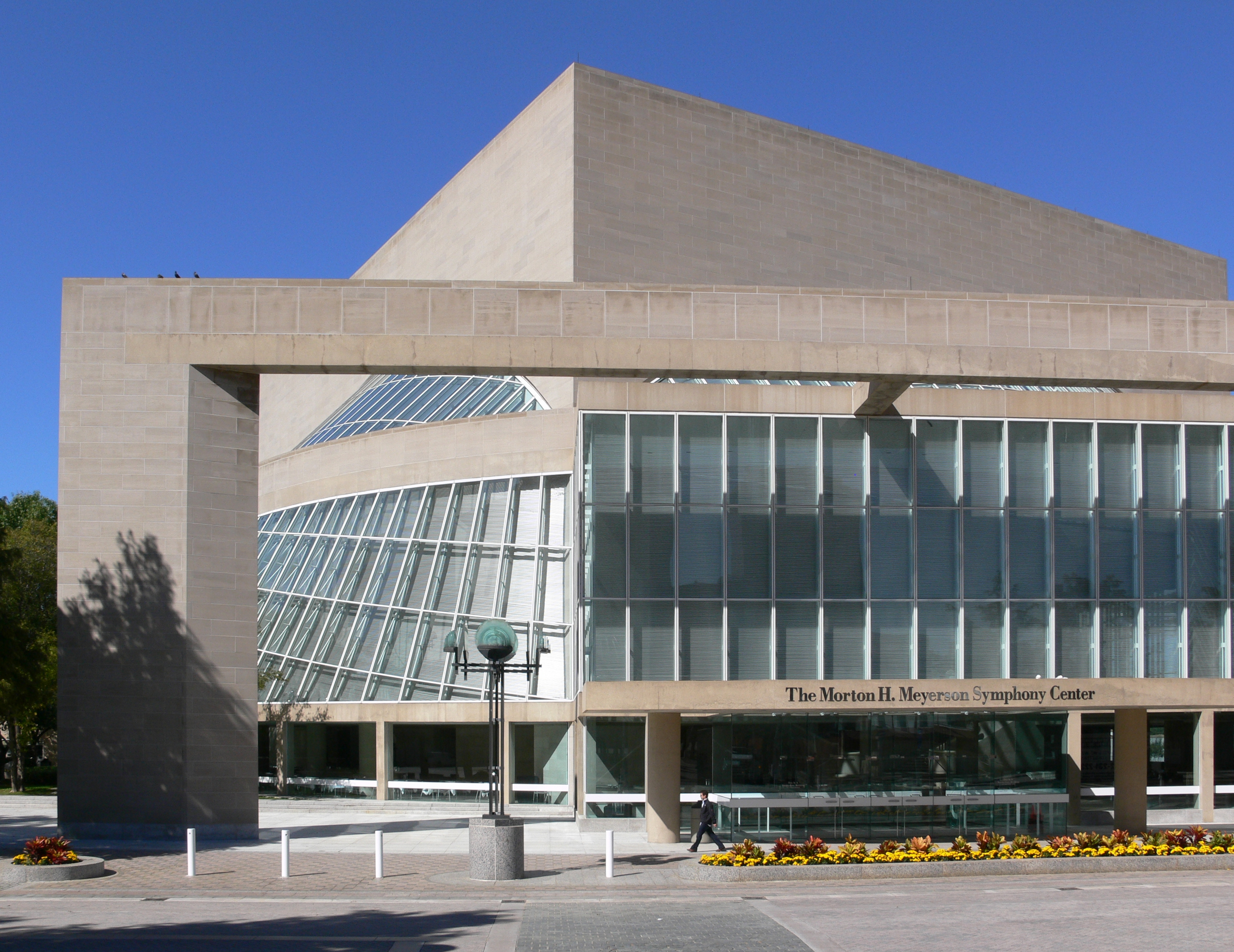
Morton H. Meyerson Symphony Center

In the 1970s and 1980s, the postmodern music movement would see the rise of composers such American composers like John Cage who adopted atonal structures and took an experimental approach to music composition, most famously and controversially with his 1952 piece 4'33", for which there are no notes written on the page and the music is described to consist of the sounds of the immediate environment of the audience, thus extending the definition of music to consist of any and all sounds even though they are without a composer created structure. Another example of postmodern music is that of American composer Miguel del Águila, who blends American idioms with those of his Hispanic, Latin American roots.

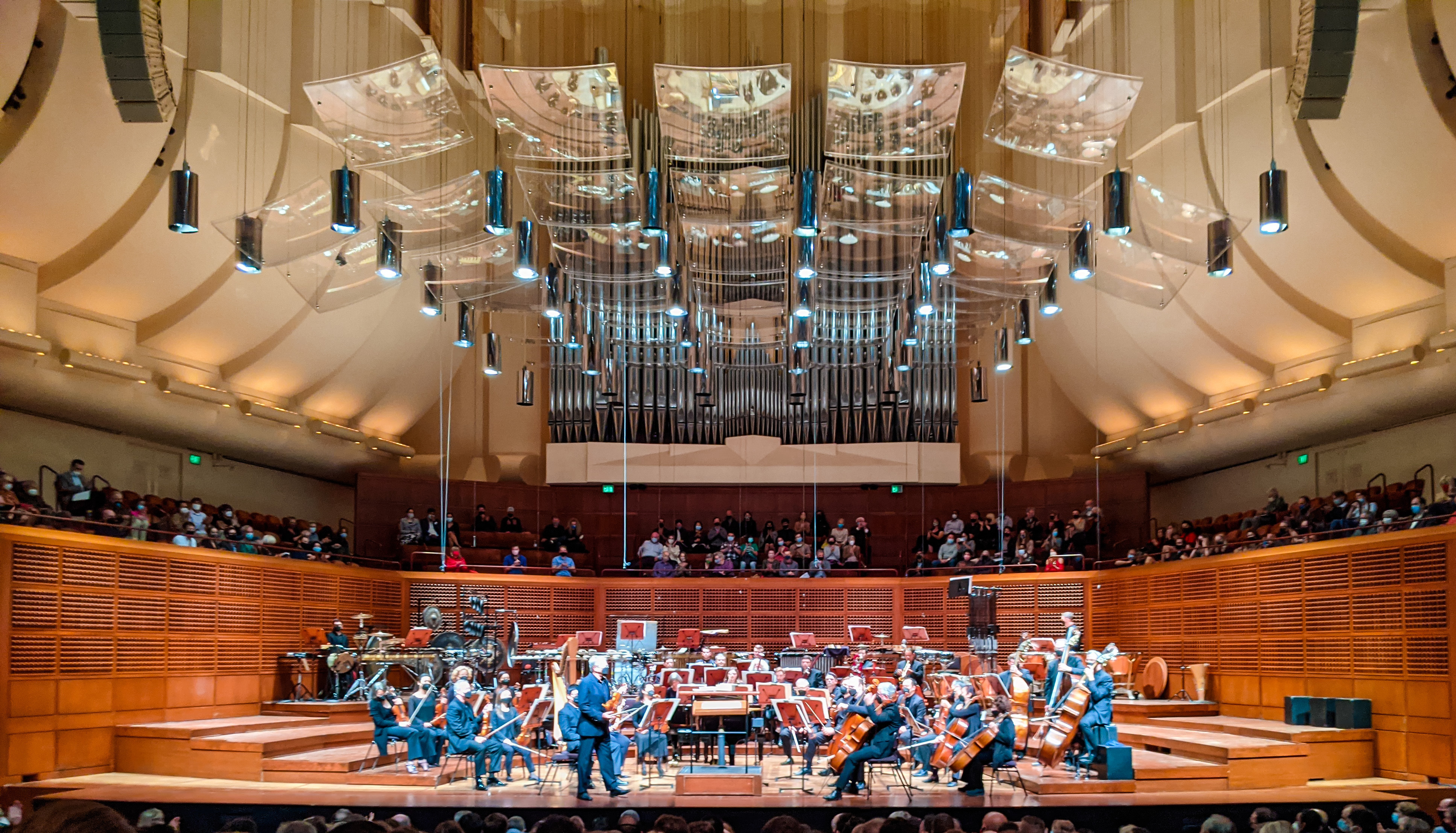
Orchestra at Davies Symphony Hall, San Francisco

In the 20th century, incidental music saw new heights with the development of the full orchestrated film score. Drawing from the opera styles of composition and the rules of Richard Wagner (specifically the idea of Gesamtkunstwerk), many early soundtracks include overtures, intermission music, and medleys and concert suites and a repeat or use of the overture for the end credits, depending on whether the movie was showing opening or ending credits. Over the evolution of the cinema the music took on greater and greater sophistication with the inclusion of advanced instrument techniques, a multiplicity of musical genre in any given work, and multicultural structures and instrumentation as the film industry, and therefore the music composition industry, became more globalized. It exploded in the 1990s in America with the release of many different blockbuster films and a high demand for fully orchestrated soundtracks, but is now often replaced with soundtracks that are entirely synthesized or utilize covers songs of famous popular songs or are even composed by popular performers, such as in the soundtrack for the 1997 film Titanic (Titanic: Music from the Motion Picture) and the use of many popular songs for specific historical references in the soundtrack for the movie Forrest Gump (Forrest Gump: The Soundtrack). Because of the growing common practice of using popular songs combined with a more classical soundtrack, it became a standard to release two soundtracks with one made of up the popular genre selected songs, and the original score or film score as mentioned previously. Significant American composers of film music include Danny Elfman, Michael Giacchino, Jerry Goldsmith, Bernard Herrmann, James Horner, James Newton Howard, Erich Wolfgang Korngold, Randy Newman, Alan Silvestri, and John Williams.

Classical and popular (non-classical) genre fusion compositions also developed in the United States, starting c. 1950s, with entertainers such as Liberace and composers such as Walter Murphy bringing classical music to different genre with their arrangements, such as in Walter Murphy's disco-classical fusion piece "A Fifth of Beethoven". Many disco versions of famous classical works were arranged in the 1970s, such as works by Beethoven, Mozart, Schubert, Wagner, Mussorgsky, J.S. Bach, and George Gershwin.

Popular classical works are also referenced and covered frequently in the United States, also starting c. 1940s-50s, in cartoons, famously in Rhapsody Rabbit and The Cat Concerto, both using Franz Liszt's famous solo piano concert piece: Hungarian Rhapsody No. 2.

== See also ==
- Timeline of music in the United States
