= Music history of the United States during the colonial era =

The colonial history of the United States began in 1607 with the colonization of Jamestown, Virginia. Music of all genres and origins emerged as the United States began to form. From the Indigenous spiritual music to the African banjos, music in the United States is as diverse as its people. In New England, the music was very religious and was vitally important in the rising of American music. The migration of people southward led to the settling of the Appalachian Mountains. There many poor Europeans inhabited and brought country blues and fiddling. As music spread, the religious hymns were still just as popular. The first New England School, Shakers, and Quakers, which were all music and dance groups inspired by religion, rose to fame. In 1776, St. Cecilia Music Society opened in the Province of South Carolina and led to many more societies opening in the Northern United States. African slaves were brought to the United States and introduced the music world to instruments like the xylophone, drums and banjo. The diverse music of the United States comes from the diverse type of people who first colonized this country.

== Indigenous music ==
Native Americans in the United States had no indigenous traditions of classical music, nor a secular song tradition. Their music is spiritual in nature, performed usually in groups in a ritual setting important to Native American religion.

It was not until the 1890s that Native American music began to enter the American establishment. At the time, the first pan-tribal cultural elements, such as powwows, were being established, and composers like Edward MacDowell and Henry Franklin Belknap Gilbert used Native themes in their compositions. It was not until the much later work of Arthur Farwell, however, that an informed representation of Native music was brought into the American classical scene, part of the Indianist movement.

== Appalachian folk music ==
The Appalachian Mountains have long been a center for cultural innovation, in spite of only sparse settlement by Native Americans and Europeans alike. Due to complex geologic reasons, the mountains and subranges were difficult to cross and included ridges of uninhabitable quartz mixed with valleys of soil unsuitable for agriculture. As a result, immigration of Europeans and their African slaves tended to be southern in direction, along the Piedmont area, and the Appalachian region was populated by poor Europeans. These Europeans were of English, Scots-Irish, German, and Huguenot origin. This settlement occurred primarily from 1775 to 1850.

English, Anglo-Irish, and Border Scottish tunes and ballads continued evolving from their distant roots along the Appalachians, eventually forming the major basis for jug bands, country blues, hillbilly music and a mix of other genres which eventually became country music. These folk tunes adopted characteristics from multiple sources, including British broadside ballads (which switched their themes from love to a distinctly American preoccupation with masculine work like mining or sensationalistic disasters and murder), African folk tunes (and their lyrical focus on semi-historical events) and minstrel shows and music halls. Popular ballads included "Barbara Allen" and "Matty Groves". The banjo was also introduced, having gone through numerous geographic movements since its invention by the Arabians and subsequent travel across Africa, the Atlantic and throughout the Americas.

=== Fiddling ===
Appalachian fiddle styles are mostly derived from those brought to the colonies by English settlers. It is often claimed that the "Scotch snap" popularized by Niel Gow influenced Appalachian fiddling; however, according to historian Michael Newton, this is not true. Newton has claimed that English, Scottish, Irish, and American fiddle styles developed around the same time and are more like "cultural cousins" of one another. Appalachian technique was altered during the next century, with European waltzes and polkas being most influential. Square dances, based on the cotillion, and cakewalks, an African American imitation of white dances and the Virginia Reel arose during the 19th century.

=== Lined-out hymnody ===
Lined-out hymnody, a religious music style perpetuated by the Old Regular Baptists, Primitive Baptists, et al., is often studied and classified as folk music. See Old Regular Baptist, Lined-Out Hymnody.

== New England colonial music ==
The religious singing traditions of New England played an important role in the early evolution of American music. Beginning with the Pilgrim colonists, who brought the Ainsworth Psalter with them to the New World, church hymns were popular across the region. Common New Englanders soon developed their own traditions, which were viewed by some as degenerate and wanton.

=== New England choral traditions ===
The original Puritan immigrants to New England sang a number of spiritual psalms, but generally disliked secular music, or at least those varieties which they viewed as encouraging immorality and disorder. They also objected to the use of musical instruments in churches and a complex vocal liturgy, both being associated with Roman Catholicism. The well-known minister Cotton Mather wrote, in Directions for a Candidate of the Ministry, on the subject:

For MUSIC, I know not what well to day.--Do as you please. If you Fancy it, I don't Forbid it. Only do not for the sake of it, Alienate your Time too much, from those that are more Important Matters. It may be so, that you may serve your GOD the better, for the Refreshment of One that can play well on an Instrument. However, to accomplish yourself at Regular Singing, is a thing that will be of Daily Use to you. For I would not have a Day pass without Singing, but so at the same to make a Melody in your Heart unto the Lord;...

The Ainsworth Psalter provided most of the tunes in use in New England church music until the late 17th century, when congregations abandoned the Psalter, claiming the tunes were too complex and difficult to sing.

The Bay Psalme Book (The Whole Booke of Psalmes Faithfully Translated into English Metre) was published in Cambridge, Massachusetts in 1640; it was the first book of any kind printed in the English colonies of North America. It became the standard used by New England churches for many years, though it contained no music itself, merely providing psalms and pointing readers to other prominent publications. The Bay Psalm Book was faithful to its source, but did not produce beautiful singing. In 1651, then, a third edition was extensively revised by Henry Dunster and Richard Lyon, and became known as the New England Psalm Book; this became the standard for many years. In 1698, the ninth edition was printed and it was the first time that printed notation was used. By this point, the evolution from the Ainsworth Psalter to the New England Psalm Book had steadily dwindled the number of tunes in use.

The practice of lining out was often common, though its presence and utility depended on the degree of illiteracy found in congregation—generally, illiteracy was common, as was lining out. This was the process of a leader presenting one line of a song, then maintaining the first note for the congregation to match as they responded with the same line. This technique was also common in churches of Appalachia, such as the Regular Baptists of Kentucky.

==== The organ and the birth of the church band ====
Organs were the only instrument in use in church music during this era, and even this was not without controversy. During the colonial era, in churches in the Calvinist tradition - including in most Puritan meetinghouses - only unaccompanied singing was permitted during worship. Indeed, after the death of Thomas Brattle, treasurer of Harvard College in 1713, he bequeathed his organ to the Brattle Square Church in Boston, but the church (which he had founded) did not think it proper, and gave it to the King's Chapel, which was the Anglican. Still, the organ was used in other New England churches. The first organ said to be designed for church use was installed in Newport, Rhode Island in 1733. Organs, however, were expensive and difficult to play. Only the largest churches could afford an organ and organist, and so many used more portable instruments, such as the bass fiddle, which was called "God's fiddle" to distinguish it from the much-maligned "Devil's fiddle" (violin). Later, other instruments like the ophicleide, trombone, cornet, German flute, bassoon, violin and clarinet were added, thus birthing the church band.

=== Secular folk music ===
Though it had long been supposed that the religious aversion to secular music inhibited instrumental folk music in New England, recent research by Barbara Lambert, focused on the Boston area, shows otherwise. Personally owned instruments recorded included the cittern, virginals, soprano clarinet, bassoon, trumpet, fife, flute, viol and violin and fiddle and the Mrs. Healy pipe.

Despite some hostility on the part of ministers like Increase Mather, dance music was popular in the New England colonial era, especially by the early 18th century, as the local population boomed with an influx of more settlers.

Broadside ballads were also known. As in British music, these were printed songs performed to a well-known tune, and included border ballads like The Ballad of Chevy Chase.

Though there is much in primary sources referring to folk music of the time, it is virtually all written by those who condemned the songs as uncouth. As such, little is objectively known. There was a distinction between the "Regular Singing" style of zealous reformers, mostly clergymen educated at Harvard, and the "Common Way" of the folk. Reformers included prominent clergymen like Thomas Walter and Nathaniel Chauncey, many of whom regarded their style of "regular" singing as more sophisticated as well as more devout. The evidence, however, indicates that the common people's music was more complex, using techniques like ornamentation.

The formation of schools and societies promoting regular singing helped to spread the practice, and instruction books were published.

=== John Wesley's legacy and the spread south ===
In the 18th century, Americans composed a number of their own hymns, often based on the Old Testament; the English nonconformist Isaac Watts, especially his Hymns and Spiritual Songs, was also very popular. John Wesley, the founder of the Methodist Church, played a major role in revivalist hymnody after a trip to Georgia in 1735 at the invitation of James Oglethorpe. Wesley and his brother, Charles Wesley, went with Oglethorpe and twenty-six Moravian missionaries. The Moravian singing inspired John Wesley to study their music. He published a collection of translations of German hymns in 1737, A Collection of Psalms and Hymns, then returned to England in 1738, attending meetings of the Moravian Brethren in London. There, during a reading of Luther's preface to the Epistle to the Romans, Wesley had a spiritual experience and found his faith in Christ rejuvenated.

==== Great Awakening ====
After returning to America, Wesley became an important preacher in a rise of fervent Christianity called the Great Awakening, along with George Whitefield and Jonathan Edwards, among others. Wesley and his brother began writing a number of hymns, at first just words, and then with music beginning with a collection usually called the Foundery Collection.

Wesley and some other preachers fought against the embellishment of his hymns. In 1761, Wesley's collection Select Hymns, with Tunes Annext: Designed Chiefly for Use of the People Called Methodists directed singers to follow the tunes "exactly as printed" and to "sing in tune"; both directions were impractical, since most of the worshippers likely couldn't read music or carry a tune.

Nevertheless, the Great Awakening (and other hymnal styles from New England) spread south and changed from Wesley's strict formulas. John Cennick (known for widespread hymns like "Jesus My All to Heaven Is Gone") and John Newton are likely the two most important individuals in the creation of Great Awakening-era hymns, which were sung at camp meetings. These hymns, sung at large gatherings, especially in the south, provided a basis for gospel and blues in the late 19th and early 20th century. Some of the common features included Cennick's innovation of hymns sung as a dialogue, as well as Newton, a former slave trader who converted after reading The Imitation of Christ by Thomas à Kempis, who wrote more than two hundred hymns that drew on his own experiences wrestling with sin, and proved extremely popular.

==== First New England School ====
Compared with the older songs, Wesley and other new composers wrote with a simple structure. Rural farmers and workers expanded on these structures, creating complex songs which some musical conservatives railed against to no avail. It was in this context that a wave of itinerant singing masters, including William Billings, arose, creating hymns that remain standard across the country. This field was called the First New England School. Following Billings' pioneering footsteps were Supply Belcher, Andrew Law, Daniel Read, Jacob Kimball, Jeremiah Ingalls, John Wyeth, James Lyon, Oliver Holden, Justin Morgan and Timothy Swan.

The First New England School is usually considered the first uniquely American invention in music. The most characteristic feature was that the voices, male and female respectively, doubled their parts in any octave in order to fill out the harmony; this generated a texture of close-position chords that was unknown in European traditions.

William Billings was of special importance and popularity. A native of Boston, Billings was a tanner by trade, and was mainly self-taught in music. He did not always follow the standard rules of composition in his works, and has thus been called the "first American composer to emphasize strongly a creative independence and to flaunt his personal idiosyncrasies in both his music and (especially) his published writings". He taught a famous singing school in Stoughton, Massachusetts in 1774. A few of the singers later formed the Stoughton Musical Society, a choral organization consisting of 25 men.

Supply Belcher, born in Stoughton, Massachusetts, though later based out of Farmington, Maine, is also especially well known. His only published tunebook was 1794's The Harmony of Maine, which included anthems, fuging pieces, psalms and hymns, a number of which were secular. His songs were distinctively folky and down-to-earth. His contemporary Daniel Read, a Massachusetts-born musician who later moved to New Haven, Connecticut, was a popular musician who supported himself almost entirely off the sale of tunebooks. His first publication was entitled The American Singing Book; or, a New and Easy Guide to the Art of Psalmody Devised for the Use of Singing Schools in America. The title's use of psalmody is here referring to singing societies which were spreading across the country, and is used without religious connotations.

Billings, Belcher and Read were the beginning of a chain of tunebook compilers that grew increasingly secular, as the art of psalmody lost its religious importance. Other Massachusetts-born compilers followed in their footsteps, beginning with Jeremiah Ingalls of Newbury, Vermont. Their songs were generally fugues, and were disapproved of by religious authorities. Andrew Law was an important compiler as well; he felt that American music should be more like European, and is best known for organizing singing schools and tunebooks. In addition, he composed several songs of note, and invented a kind of musical notation called shape note.

=== Shakers ===
The Shakers, or United Society of Believers in Christ's Second Appearing, were a religion founded near Manchester, England, in the mid-1700s, and rose to prominence under the leadership of Ann Lee (Mother Ann). Lee had been born poor, and worked as a child in a cotton factory before her parents married her to a blacksmith. After giving birth to four children, all of whom died in infancy, Mother Ann came to view sexual intercourse as evil. Celibacy became an integral part of her religion. She was jailed for disturbing the Sabbath in 1772. Two years later, Shakers started moving to North America, settling in New England and as far south as New York. The rituals that Mother Ann designed, which she claimed to have seen in visions, included passionate dances that represented part of a battle between the holy Shakers and the devil and the flesh. Though their strange customs and British mannerisms drew some hostility from the colonists, as the American Revolutionary War was brewing, the Shakers grew in number and eventually spread as far south as Kentucky. Though Mother Ann died in 1784, the Shaker traditions lived on. Their best known dance song is Simple Gifts, used by Aaron Copland in his ballet score Appalachian Spring.

== European professionals ==
In 1766, Charlestown (Charleston), South Carolina became the home of the St. Cecilia Society, the first musical society in North America. At the time, Charleston was a cultural center, attracting a number of musicians from Europe. In the decades after the Revolution, more northern cities like Philadelphia, New York and Boston largely took Charleston's place. Philadelphia, home of the esteemed Alexander Reinagle, John Christopher Moller, Rayner Taylor and Susannah Haswell Rowson, was especially renowned for musical development. Reinagle became the most influential figure in Philadelphia's musical life, organizing a number of concerts, organizations and musical events.

The English singer Benjamin Carr was especially notable. He arrived in New York in 1793, along with his brother and father. They soon became prominent music publishers and vendors, owning stores in New York, Philadelphia and Baltimore. Carr himself was a composer, organist, pianist and a publisher and editor. They published, in Philadelphia, "The President's March" in 1793; written by Philip Phile, "The President's March" is one of the most enduring of American patriotic songs. The march was soon politicized, adopted by the Federalists as a rallying song.

The British James Hewitt was one of the most distinguished musicians of early American history. He was already renowned in London before moving across the Atlantic, accompanied by Belgian composer and violinist Jean Gehot. Hewitt became established in New York, organizing concerts and other musical events. His opera Tammany; or, The Indian Chief became controversial after its first performance. It was the first American opera to deal with Native Americans, and was sponsored by the New York Tammany Society, an anti-Federalist organization. Hewitt was the target of much invective from Federalists as a result.

The English organist, choirmaster and composer William Selby was a major figure in Boston's musical life, along with the Dutch organist, violinist and composer Peter Albrecht van Hagen and German oboist Johann Christian Gottlieb Graupner.

== Gentleman amateur composers ==
The great urban centers of the mid-Atlantic included cities like Philadelphia and Baltimore, and it was there that European classical traditions were best represented. Philip Phile, Johann Friedrich Peter and Alexander Reinagle were prominent composers of the era, though Francis Hopkinson, a signer of the Declaration of Independence from Philadelphia, remains the best-known. One of his compositions, "My Days Have Been So Wondrous Free", is well-remembered as the first art song from the United States (though this is disputed); it is, however, lacking in originality and innovation to set it apart from European compositions.

At the time, professional musicians were looked-down upon and considered coarse. Gentlemen performers played often, mostly for other aristocratic audiences, and without pay. As the United States developed, the south became the land of deep socioeconomic divisions. Land ownership and the possession of chattel slavery became an integral component of a gentleman's livelihood, while in the north, the idea of a landed aristocracy never carried as much weight.

=== Lowell Mason ===
Perhaps the most influential early composer was Lowell Mason. A native of Boston, Mason campaigned against the use of shape-note notation, and for the education in standard notation. He worked with local institutions to release collections of hymns and maintain his stature. Opposed to the shape-note tradition, Mason pushed American music towards a European model.

== Rural Pennsylvanian music ==
Rural Pennsylvania in the colonial era was home to religious minorities like the Quakers, as well as important Moravian and Lutheran communities. While the Quakers had few musical traditions, Protestant churches frequently made extensive use of music in worship J. F. Peter emerged from the Moravian tradition, while Conrad Beissel (founder of the Ephrata Cloister) innovated his own system of harmonic theory. The Lutheran traditions of Johann Sebastian Bach, Buxtehude, Johann Pachelbel and Walther were propagated in Pennsylvania, and the city of Bethlehem remains a center of Lutheran musical traditions today.

=== Mennonites ===
The Mennonites, followers of Menno Simons, settled in Germantown after emigrating from the German Palatinate and Switzerland between 1683 and 1748. They were led by Willem Rittinghuysen (grandfather of astronomer and mathematician David Rittenhouse). The Mennonites used a hymnbook from Schaffhausen, reprinted in Germantown in 1742 as Der Ausbund Das ist etliche schöne christliche Lieder.

=== Ephrata Cloister ===
The Ephrata Cloister (Community of the Solitary) was founded in what is now Lancaster County on the Cocalico River in 1720. This was a group of Seventh Day Baptists led by Peter Miller and Conrad Beissel, who believed in using music as an integral part of worship. Beissel codified the Ephrata Cloister's unique tradition in his Beissel's Dissertation on Harmony; here, he divided notes into two types. These were masters, or notes belonging to the common chord, and servants, or all other notes. Accented syllables in Beissel's works always fell on master notes, leaving servant notes for unaccented syllables. The Ephrata Cloister's hymnbook was large, consisting of more than 1,000 hymns, many of which were accompanied by instruments including the violin. Many of these hymns were published in the 1740s and 50s.

=== Moravian Church ===
Founded in 1457, the Moravian Church originally spread across Moravia, Poland and Bohemia before persecution forced the remaining faithful to Saxony, where they lived under the protection of Count Nikolaus Ludwig von Zinzendorf. Zinzendorf wrote hymns, and led the Moravians to America, where they began missionary work in Georgia but with little success. They moved on to Pennsylvania, and founded the town of Bethlehem on the banks of the Lehigh River. A group then left for Salem, North Carolina (now a part of Winston-Salem).

Both in Salem and Bethlehem, Moravians continued to use music in their ceremonies. Instruments included organs and trombones, and voices were usually in choirs. Players generally played on rooftops for most any occasion, ensuring that they could be heard for great distances. A legend has arisen claiming that a group of Native American warriors approached a Moravian settlement during the French and Indian War, but left after hearing a trombone choir because they believed it to be the voice of their Great Spirit. Moravians were devoted to missionary work, especially among African slaves and Native Americans; in 1763, they published a collection of hymns in the Delaware language.

Moravians also had a tradition of secular art music that included the famed composer Johann Friedrich Peter, who was a German born in the Netherlands who emigrated to Bethlehem in 1770. He brought with him copies of compositions by Joseph Haydn, Johann Christoph Friedrich Bach, Johann Stamitz and C. F. Abel. After living in Bethlehem for a time, Peter moved to Salem, where he founded the Collegium Musicum (in 1786) and collected hundreds of symphonies, anthems and oratorios. It was during this period that Peter also composed a number of well-respected instrumental pieces for twio violins, two violas and a cello; he also composed sacred anthems like "It Is a Precious Thing" and arias like "The Lord Is in His Holy Temple".

The Moravian Church continued to produce a number of renowned composers into the 19th century, including John Antes as well as Francis F. Hagen, Johann Christian Bechler, Edward W. Leinbach, Simon Peter, David Moritz Michael, Georg Gottfried Müller, Peter Wolle, Jeremiah Dencke and Johannes Herbst. Herbst was also a noted collector, whose archives, left to the Salem church after his death, were made public in 1977; these included more than 11,000 pages of content. Salem has gradually become the center for Moravian musical innovation, partially due to the presence of the Moravian Music Foundation.

=== Pietists ===
In 1694, Johannes Kelpius brought a group of German Pietists to the banks of the Wissahickon Creek in southeastern Pennsylvania. These became known as the Hermits or Mystics of the Wissahickon; this 1871 map of Wissahickon Creek notes a Kelpius spring and Hermits Glen. Kelpius was a musician, and he and his followers brought with them instruments that became an integral part of church life. Kelpius was also a composer, and is sometimes called the first Pennsylvanian composer, based on his unproven authorship of several hymns in The Lamenting Voice of the Hidden Love. It is likely that he wrote the text, though the tunes are mostly based on German songs; the English translations in the collection are attributed to Christopher Witt, an Englishman who immigrated and joined the mystics, also building them a pipe organ, said to be the first privately owned organ in North America.

In 1703, Justus Falckner was ordained as pastor of the Gloria Dei Church; Falckner evidently believed that music was a very important element of missionary work, writing to Germany to ask for an organ, which he said would attract more Native American converts. Falckner was a Lutheran who wrote hymns such as "Rise, Ye Children of Salvation".

=== Harmony Society ===
In 1803 and 1804, a group of Christian pietists led by George Rapp arrived from Württemberg, Germany, settled in Harmony, Pennsylvania, and formed the Harmony Society in 1805. The group lived communally, were pacifistic, advocated celibacy, and music was a big part of their lives. The Harmonites (or Harmonists) wrote their own music and even had an orchestra. The Society lasted until 1906, but their final settlement, Old Economy Village (now Ambridge, Pennsylvania) contains archives with sheet music that is still performed at special community events.

== African Americans ==
Brought to the United States as early as 1619, enslaved Africans were from a variety of tribes from West Africa, including the Ashanti, Yoruba, Bini, Congo and Dahomean tribes. They spoke hundreds of languages; some came from rival tribes, or isolated communities with little connection to anyone else until the arrival of the slave traders. Some of the larger groups had extensive contact with the Muslims of North Africa and the distant cultures of East and Southern Africa.

Enslaved individuals brought with them work songs, religious music and dance, and a wide variety of instruments, including kalimba, xylophone, flutes and rattles. Perhaps the most important characteristic, however, was the call-and-response vocal style, in which a singer and the audience trade lines back-and-forth. This practice lent itself well to the burgeoning New England hymn tradition, and the two fields began commingling early in the nation's history. Another unusual characteristic of much African music is that, rather than begin and end a tune or phrase on a pure note as in Western music, African singers would slide onto or below the note.

The most distinctive component of African music, however, is the focus on the rhythm. In this respect, African folk styles are far more complex than anything developed anywhere else in the world. African music is usually polyrhythmic, made by a wide variety of percussion instruments, both pitched and unpitched, using numerous kinds of natural materials. Polythythms were imported along with slaves to the New World, where it has found its way to genres ranging from African American gospel to pop-swing and rock and roll.

Many slavers encouraged enslaved individuals to sing as they work, believing that it improved morale and made them work harder. They generally required that all tunes remain cheerful and pleasant in tone to ensure that this occurred. This music, when accompanied, used only a single drum or other object used for percussion. Since they were often without instruments, clapping and foot-stomping became an integral part of the music of enslaved people. The banjo and various kinds of drums were the most important instruments, but enslaved Africans also used varieties of panpipes, notched gourds played with a scraper (similar to a güiro) and rattles. The thumb piano was also known, similar to the African mbira or sanza. In addition, Black individuals soon mastered European instruments like the clarinet, oboe, French horn and, most importantly, the violin. Often, prominent gentlemen had enslaved Black people act as musicians and entertainers. Some became quite prominent, like Virginia's Sy Gilliat, who performed at state balls in Williamsburg. His assistant after the capitol moved to Richmond was known as London Brigs and was a renowned player.

=== Drums ===
Enslaved Africans in places like Haiti, Brazil and the Dominican Republic retained the use of drums, and their percussion has formed an integral part of Afro-Caribbean and Latin music. In the British North American colonies, however, drums were prohibited; colonial slavers had feared drums would be used as communication between enslaved people, and that the drums' use may aid uprisings and rebellions. Drums did, however, remain a prominent part of the music of the French colony of Louisiana.

=== Banjo ===
The banjo was a feature of enslaved Black life in America, mentioned by Thomas Jefferson, for example, in his Notes on the State of Virginia, in which he referred to it as a banjar and noted that the instrument came from Africa. Other names included bangoe, banshaw, bangelo, banza, bangil and banjer. The instrument was described in West Africa as early as 1620 by Richard Jobson, but was present for some time before.

In North America, the banjo was typically made by hollowing out a gourd or calabash and attaching a long neck. Enslaved people then stretched a piece of animal hide, usually raccoon, over the bowl and attached four strings. Jefferson claimed that the banjar with which he was familiar was tuned to E-A-d-g.

== Notes ==
=== Sources ===
- American Music Preservation
- PBS' page on their series American Roots Music
- Friends of American roots music homepage
- Library of Congress collection of brass band materials
- Essential American Recordings Survey
