= Fuguing tune =

Variety of Anglo-American choral music

The fuguing tune (often spelled fuging tune) is a variety of Anglo-American vernacular choral music. Fuguing tunes form a significant number of the songs found in the American Sacred Harp singing tradition. They first flourished in the mid-18th century and continue to be composed today.

== Description ==
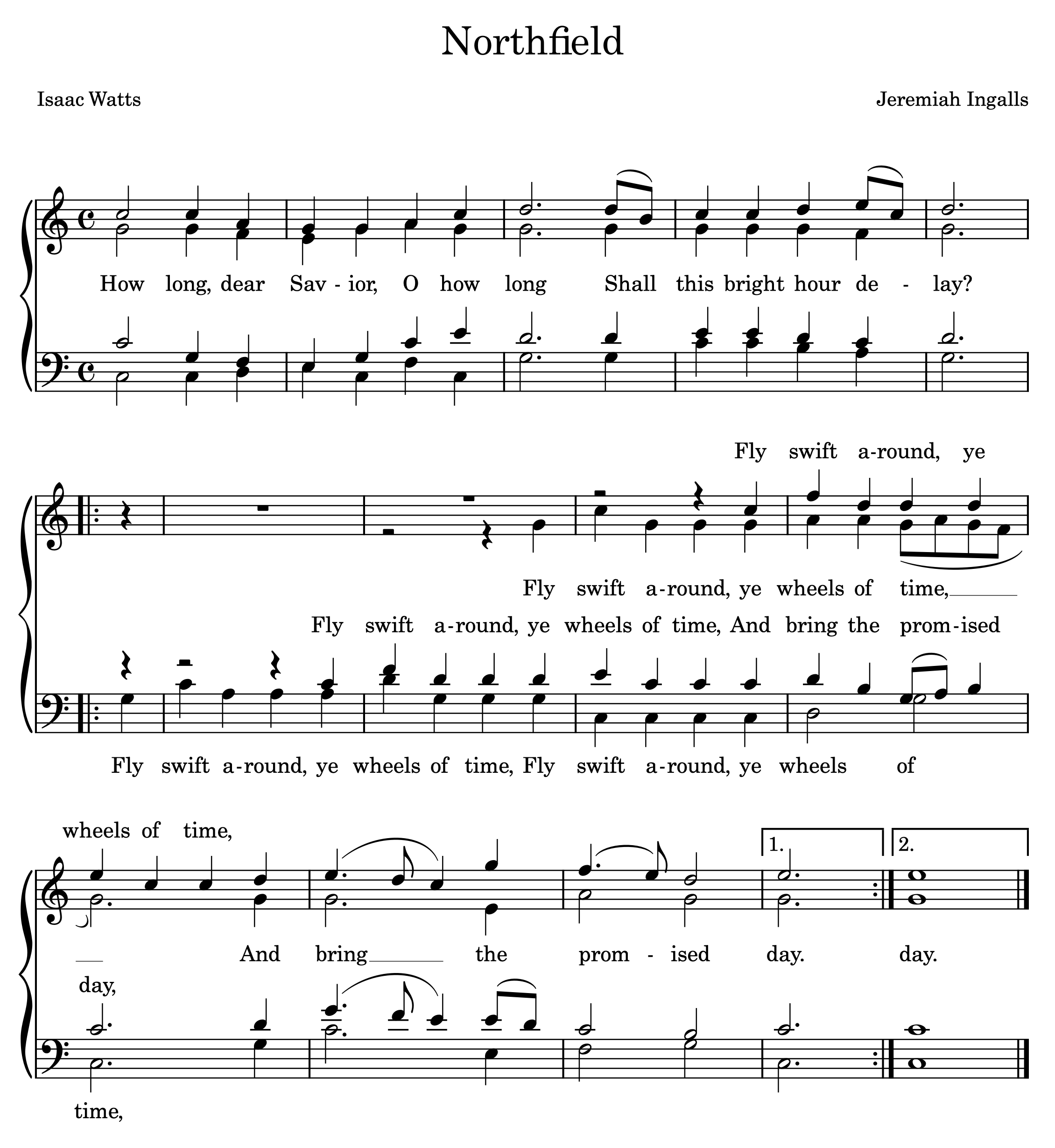
Transcription of "Northfield" by Jeremiah Ingalls.

Fuguing tunes are sacred music, specifically, Protestant hymns. They are written for a four-part chorus singing a cappella. George Pullen Jackson has described the fuguing tune as follows:

In the fuging tune all the parts start together and proceed in rhythmic and harmonic unity usually for the space of four measures or one musical sentence. The end of this sentence marks a cessation, a complete melodic close. During the next four measures the four parts set in, one at a time and one measure apart. First the basses take the lead for a phrase a measure long, and as they retire on the second measure to their own proper bass part, the [tenors] take the lead with a sequence that is imitative of, if not identical with, that sung by the basses. The tenors in turn give way to the altos, and they to the trebles, all four parts doing the same passage (though at different pitches) in imitation of the [part in the] preceding measure. ... Following this fuguing passage comes a four-measure phrase, with all the parts rhythmically neck and neck, and this closes the piece; though the last eight measures are often repeated.

Audio of "Northfield" by Jeremiah Ingalls.

A well-known fuguing tune that is typical of the form is "Northfield", composed in 1804 by Jeremiah Ingalls. The text is by Isaac Watts.

== Variety in fuguing tunes ==
George Pullen Jackson's description above gives a common form for a fuguing tune, but there are variations. Jackson describes the entrance order of the four parts as "bottom to top" (Bass-Tenor-Alto-Treble), but this is not the only possible order. Indeed, in the fuguing tunes printed in The Sacred Harp, 1991 edition, it is not even the most common one; the most common order is Bass-Tenor-Treble-Alto (Note: In many cases, this is because the alto part was a later addition to a three-part arrangement, and so joins after the original entry sequence). There are many other orders possible, particularly if one includes the many cases in which composers bring in two parts at once (so that there are just three instead of four entrances). However, it does seem to be a widely valid rule that the basses must at least be included in the first group to enter. This may reflect a wish to support the entrances with a solid bass line, or perhaps just a practical consideration: thanks to the weight of existing tradition, the bass singers have considerable practice in coming in alone at the beginning of a musical phrase, practice which the other sections lack. Thus a fuguing tune with a bass-first structure is likely to be more stable in performance.

== History ==
The fuguing tune arose in England in the middle of the 18th century. The first fuguing tunes were the work of itinerant singing masters, described by Irving Lowens as follows:

[The singing masters were] often ill-trained by orthodox standards ... [They] wandered from village to village and eked out an existence by teaching the intricacies of psalm-singing and the rudiments of music to all who cared to learn. To supplement his generally meager income, [the singing master] frequently sold self-compiled tune-books in which psalm tunes of his own composition ... were featured as examples of his skill and artistry.

According to Lowens, the fuguing tunes created by these singing masters at first involved a separate fuguing section appended to the end of a complete psalm tune. Later, the fuguing became more integrated and eventually evolved to be the longer part of the song.

There is good evidence that by 1760, English tune books including fuguing tunes were circulating in the American colonies; the first English fuguing tune printed in America appeared in the hymnbook Urania, or A Choice Collection of Psalm-Tunes, Anthems, and Hymns by James Lyon. Soon, fuguing tunes were being written in great profusion by American—especially New England—composers. Karl Kroeger (see reference below) has documented the publication of almost 1300 fuguing tunes during the period 1750–1820. Among the principal composers of New England fuguing tunes ("Yankee tunesmiths") Irving Lowens lists the following: William Billings, Daniel Read, Jacob French, Timothy Swan, Stephen Jenks, Supply Belcher, Abraham Maxim, Lewis Edson, Joseph Stone, Elisha West, Justin Morgan, and Daniel Belknap.

The fuguing tune shared the fate of the endogenous American tradition of hymnody in general; it was gradually replaced by European-based music as a result of the "Better Music Movement"; for discussion see Lowell Mason. An early sign of the decline was that fuguing tunes were outlawed in public worship by the Methodist Episcopal Church in 1792. Fuguing tunes survived in the rural South (see Sacred Harp) and starting in the mid-20th century achieved more widespread circulation as hobbyist singers in the United States and overseas adopted the Sacred Harp and similar traditions.

Pianist, musicologist, and composer Jeanne Behrend curated and edited a volume of traditional American choral fuguing tunes, reflecting the 18th- and 19th-century "Yankee tunesmith" tradition typified by composers like William Billings.

== Fuguing tunes and fugues ==
The similarity of the terms "fugue" and "fuguing tune" means that the two forms are easily confused. A fuguing tune certainly is not some kind of failed attempt to write a fugue, as an ill-informed musicologist once asserted. This is plain from the different structures of the two genres: in a fugue, the voices take turns coming in at the very beginning of the piece, whereas in a fuguing tune that moment comes about a third of the way through. Moreover, in a fugue the musical material used at each entrance (the so-called "subject") is repeated many times throughout the piece, whereas in a fuguing tune it normally appears just in the one location of sequenced entries, and the rest of the work is somewhat more homophonic in texture.

Indeed, "fuguing" does not derive from "fugue". Rather, as Irving Lowens points out, both terms hark back to a still earlier, more general usage (ultimately from Latin fugere "to flee"). He cites the words of Thomas Morley, who wrote (in 1597 in his Plaine and Easie Introduction to Practicall Musicke), "We call that a Fuge, when one part beginneth and the other singeth the same, for some number of Notes (which the first did sing)." In modern musical terminology, this is called a "canon", though Lowens interprets the passage more loosely, explaining that "fuging is pretty well synonymous with what we today call the technique of imitative writing".

== See also ==
- Metrical psalter
- West gallery music
- Yankee tunesmiths

== Books ==
- Jackson, George Pullen (1933). White Spirituals in the Southern Uplands. Chapel Hill: University of North Carolina Press. (Unaltered reprint, as White Spirituals in the Southern Uplands: The Story of the Fasola Folk, Their Songs, Singings, and "Buckwheat Notes". Hatboro, PA: Folklore Associates. Reprinted again under the same title, New York: Dover Publications, 1965. ISBN 0-486-21425-7.)
- Kroeger, Karl (1993). American Fuging-Tunes, 1770-1820: A Descriptive Catalog . Westport, CT: Greenwood Press. ISBN 0-313-29000-8.
- Lowens, Irving (1953). "The Origins of the American Fuging Tune". Journal of the American Musicological Society 6, no. 1 (Spring): 43–52. Citations are from the reprinted version in Lowens (1964), except for the ones marked "Lowens 1953".
- Lowens, Irving (1964). Music and Musicians in Early America. New York: W. W. Norton.
- MacDougall, Hamilton Crawford (1940). Early New England Psalmody: An Historical Appreciation, 1620–1820. Brattleboro: Stephen Daye Press. Reprinted, Da Capo Press Music Reprint Series. New York: Da Capo Press, 1969.
