= Daniel Read =

American composer

Daniel Read (November 16, 1757 – December 4, 1836) was an American composer of the First New England School, and one of the primary figures in early American classical music.

== Life and work ==
Read, along with his contemporaries William Billings, Oliver Holden, Supply Belcher, and Justin Morgan, was one of the primary members of a group of American composers called the Yankee tunesmiths or the First New England School. While the classical music era was in its heyday in Europe, American composers of "serious" music were setting hymn tunes in three- and four-part a cappella style, with simple folklike melodies and little regard for functional harmony. Many of these works were fuguing tunes, which begin with all voices singing together (with a melody usually based on a Protestant hymn), come to a stop, and continue with each voice entering one at a time. Nearly all were hymn tunes, developed for the use of the newly-forming singing societies.

Once a private in the Massachusetts militia, later a comb-maker and owner of a general store in New Haven, Connecticut, Read was only the third American composer to put out a collection of his own music (after William Billings and Simeon Jocyln). This work, The American Singing Book (1785), went through five editions in the years immediately following: unusually successful for its day, making him by number of printings the most popular composer in the nation. To that must be added the number of published compilations of tunes that used his works (not always with his permission); "Sherburne", a 1785 tune originally from the American Singing Book, a setting of the Nahum Tate carol "While Shepherds Watched Their Flocks," appeared over seventy times in print before 1810.

Read made his living by operating a general store in New Haven, but supplemented his income by compiling and publishing tunebooks himself (which often contained his original works as well), including The Columbian Harmonist (three volumes: 1793, 1794, 1795, revised 1805, 1807, 1810) and The New Haven Collection of Sacred Music (1818). An Introduction to Psalmody (1790) was not a tunebook – in fact, it contained no music whatsoever, but was rather a pamphlet to instruct aspiring composers. Together with engraver Amos Doolittle, Read published The American Musical Magazine in twelve issues from 1786 through 1787.

Read was influenced by the practices in European music in his later years, and later repudiated the compositions in the style that he exemplified and helped define. Three of the six works of his in the 1818 New Haven Collection were "corrected" to more closely conform to European standards before reprinting in that volume; his later manuscripts are works imitating the styles of European devotional music.

Several of Read's tunes, such as "Greenwich", "Windham", and "Sherburne", are still sung in American churches; in addition to those tunes, "Judgment", "Lisbon", "Russia", "Stafford", and "Winter" appear in The Core Repertory of Early American Psalmody, a scholarly anthology of the 101 most often reprinted sacred tunes in pre-1810 America, as compiled by Richard Crawford. His work is also popular among Sacred Harp singers; eleven of his tunes appear in The Sacred Harp, 1991 Edition. During the 19th and 20th centuries, Read was one of the favorite composers performed by the Stoughton Musical Society. There are fourteen of his tunes in The Stoughton Musical Society's Centennial Collection of Sacred Music, reprinted in 1980, with a new Introduction by Roger L. Hall.

Read's surviving writings and portrait may be found today at the New Haven Museum and Historical Society in New Haven, Connecticut.

== Example ==
"Windham" is a 1785 song by Daniel Read, and one of his best-known works.

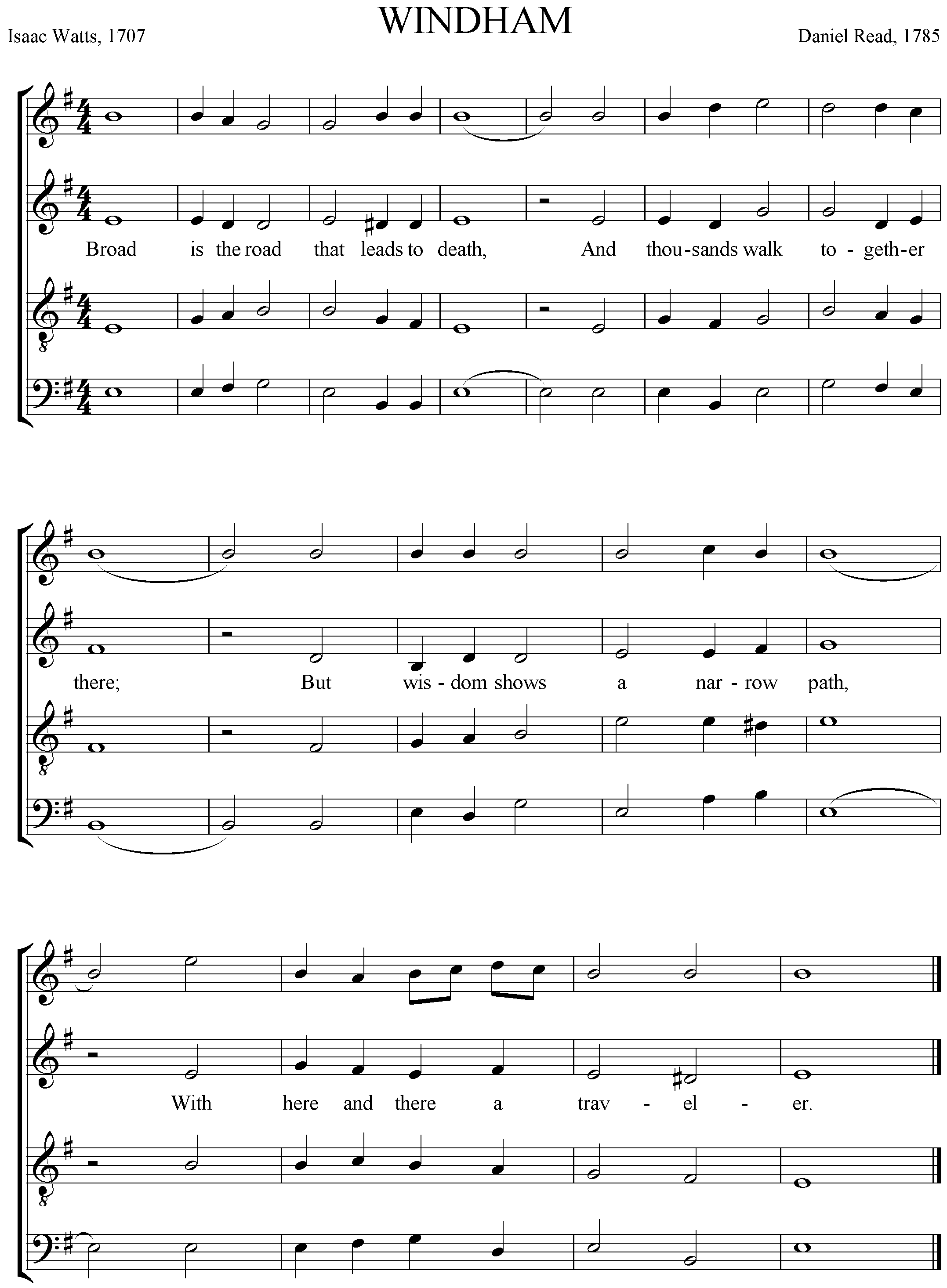

Verse 2, 3 and 4 follow. V 2 Deny thyself and take thy cross, Is the Redeemers great command; Nature must count her gold but dross, If she would gain this heavenly land. V 3 The fearful soul that tires and faints, And walks the ways of God no more, Is but esteemed almost a saint, And makes his own destruction sure. V 4 Lord, Let not all my hopes be vain, Create my heart entirely new, Which hypocrites could ne'er attain, Which false apostates never knew.

== See also ==
- Music of the United States before 1900
- American classical music
- Fuguing tune
