= Daniel Belknap =

- Born: February 9, 1771; Framingham, Province of Massachusetts, British America
- Died: October 3, 1815 (aged 44); Pawtucket, Rhode Island, United States
- Occupation: composer
- Notable work: four sacred tunebooks

Daniel Belknap (February 9, 1771 – October 3, 1815) was a farmer, mechanic, militia captain, poet and singing teacher.

Belknap was born in Framingham, Massachusetts, and was an American composer of the First New England School. He compiled four sacred tunebooks in the years 1797–1806, and also issued a book of secular songs with music. He died in Pawtucket, Rhode Island.

== Publications ==
- The Harmonist's Companion - Boston: printed by Thomas & Andrews, Oct. 1797
- The Evangelical Harmony - Boston: Thomas & Andrews, Sept. 1800
- The Middlesex Collection of Sacred Harmony- Boston: Thomas & Andrews, Nov. 1802
- The Village Compilation of Sacred Musick - Boston, printed for the author by J.T. Buckingham, 1806
- The Middlesex Songster - Dedham: printed by H. Mann, 1809
- Judgment Anthem - Dedham: printed by H. Mann, for D. Belknap, 1810

== List of works ==
- The Seasons: Spring, Summer, Autumn, Winter - The Gregg Smith Singers
- A View of the Temple: A Masonic Ode, sung at the installation of Middlesex Lodge, Framingham, Massachusetts, 1795.

== Discography ==
- America Sings, Volume I: The Founding Years (1993)
- Under an American Sky
