= Supply Belcher =

American composer, singer and compiler of tune books

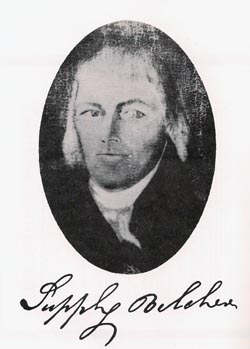
A portrait of Supply Belcher, painted during his lifetime

Supply Belcher (March 29, 1751 – June 9, 1836) was an American composer, singer, and compiler of tune books. He was one of the so-called Yankee tunesmiths or First New England School, a group of mostly self-taught composers who created sacred vocal music for local choirs. He was active first in Lexington, Massachusetts, then eventually moved to Farmington, Maine. Like most of his colleagues, Belcher could not make music his main occupation, and worked as tax assessor, schoolmaster, town clerk, and so on; nevertheless he was considerably well known for his musical activities, and even dubbed 'the Handell [sic] of Maine' by a local newspaper. Most of his works survive in The Harmony of Maine, a collection Belcher published himself in Boston in 1794.

== Life ==
Belcher was born in Stoughton, Massachusetts. In the early 1770s he moved to Boston to embark on a merchant's career, but returned to Stoughton just a few years later. He was a private during the Revolutionary War, part of the company of Stoughton Minutemen that marched to Cambridge on April 19, 1775 immediately after receiving the alarm from Lexington. Later, he was promoted to the rank of Captain under Washington. Around 1778 he bought a farm in Canton, Massachusetts and established a tavern there; he was known then as "Uncle Ply." It was at his tavern that some of the early singing meetings in the area were held, but contrary to some written accounts, Belcher never joined the Stoughton Musical Society. Also, he was not a pupil at the Stoughton singingschool, where William Billings taught in 1774.

After the war, in 1785, he moved first to Hallowell (now Augusta), Maine with his family, and then six years later they moved to Farmington, where Belcher remained until his death. He became a prominent citizen, serving as tax assessor, schoolmaster, town clerk, justice of the peace, magistrate, and even representative to the Massachusetts General Court. He was very successful in his musical activities as well: he apparently led Farmington's first choir, and attracted favourable reviews. When writing about the composer in his diary, Rev. Paul Coffin wrote: "Squire Belcher called his singers together and gave us an evening of sweet music." After the 1796 performance of Belcher's Ordination Anthem, parts of which bear resemblance to Handel's famous Messiah chorus, a Maine newspaper dubbed the composer 'the Handell of Maine'. Belcher was also active as violinist and singer. He died in Farmington on June 9, 1836.

== Works ==
Most of Belcher's 75 extant works survive in a volume titled The Harmony of Maine, which the composer published in 1794 in Boston. That collection only includes pieces by Belcher. The music is firmly rooted in the tradition of New England psalmody and William Billings in particular, although it also shows other influences (e.g. Handel, as in Ordination Anthem). Most of the pieces are in four voices and based on sacred texts, with a few exceptions—some three-voice pieces and several works with secular texts, frequently with lavishly ornamented melodic lines. Belcher composed fuguing tunes rather like those of Billings, but often with more precise performance directions. His voice-leading is considerably smoother and follows the "rules" more frequently than the work of many of his contemporaries, for instance avoiding the parallel perfect intervals and open fifths which are a common feature of New England psalmody.

The Harmony of Maine was never widely reprinted, and, like all composers of the First New England School, by mid-19th century Belcher was forgotten everywhere except a few rural areas. His works, like those of his colleagues, were rediscovered in the second half of the 20th century. A 1978 work by American avant-garde composer John Cage, Some of the "Harmony of Maine", is a collection of organ pieces based on compositions from The Harmony of Maine. Cage also adapted a number of Belcher's chorales for use in his Apartment House 1776, and these were subsequently arranged for string quartet by Irvine Arditti along with Cage's adaptations of works by William Billings, Jacob French, Andrew Law, and James Lyon as 44 Harmonies, and performed by the Arditti Quartet and issued on CD by Mode Records.

== Editions ==
- Volume 5. Supply Belcher (1751–1836), The Collected Works, edited by Linda Davenport. 192 pages, ISBN 0-8153-2427-8
