= Henry Ainsworth =

English Nonconformist clergyman and scholar (1571–1622)

Henry Ainsworth (1571–1622) was an English Nonconformist clergyman and scholar. He led the Ancient Church, a Brownist or English Separatist congregation in Amsterdam alongside Francis Johnson from 1597, and after their split led his own congregation. His translations of and commentaries on the Hebrew scriptures were influential for centuries.

== Separatist career ==
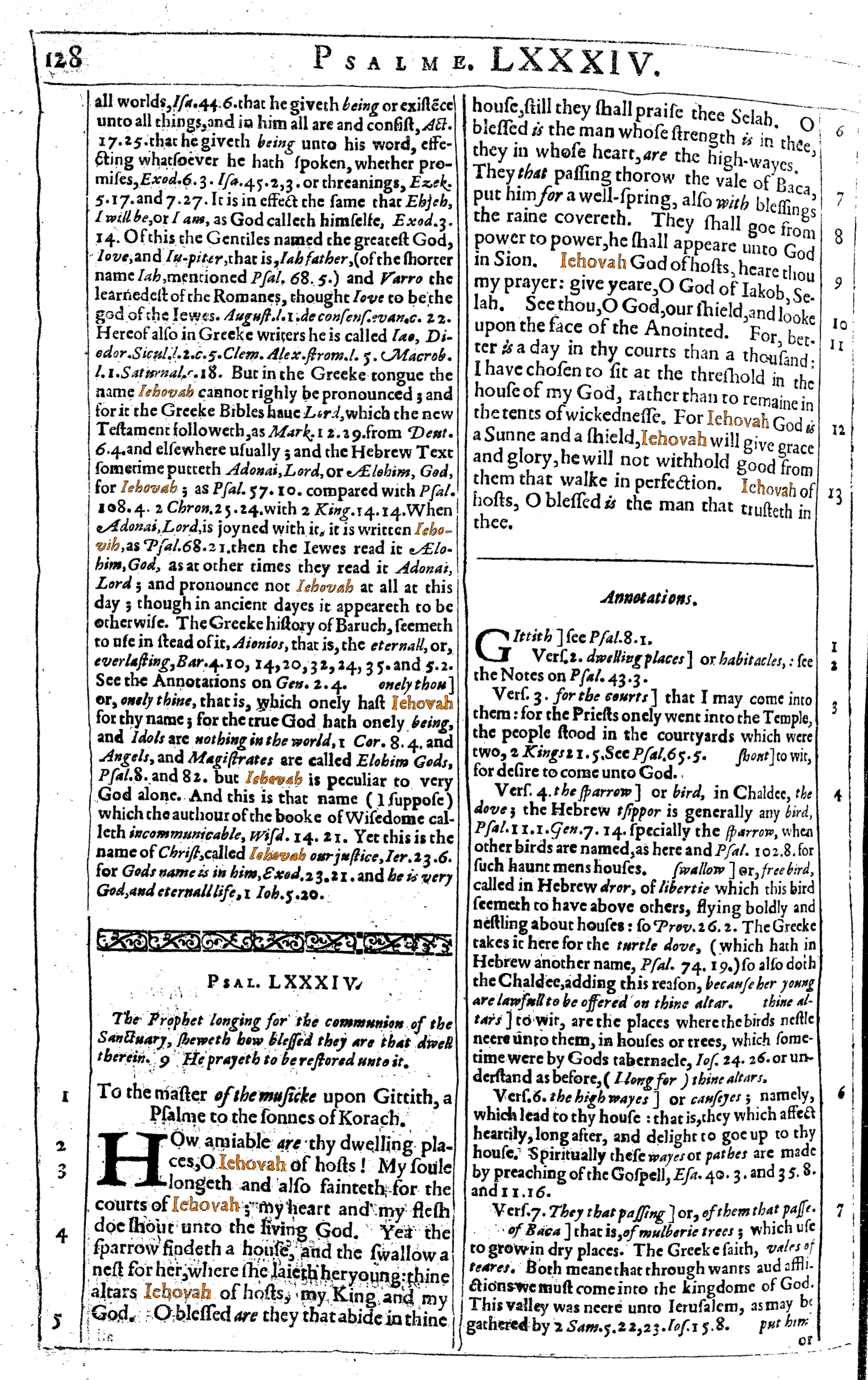
A page from Ainsworth's Annotations using the divine name Iehovah.

Ainsworth was born of a farming family of Swanton Morley, Norfolk. He was educated at St John's College, Cambridge, later moving to Caius College, but left without a degree. After associating with the Puritan party in the Church, he joined the Brownists, but submitted to the Church of England after being arrested in London, and again when he was arrested in Ireland.

By 1597, Ainsworth moved to Amsterdam and found a home in "a blind lane at Amsterdam", working as porter to a bookseller, and lived in severe poverty. According to Roger Williams, Ainsworth ‘lived on 9d a week with roots boiled’. When the pastor Francis Johnson came to the church from London, where he had been in prison, Ainsworth was elected as teacher (or doctor), thanks to his knowledge of Hebrew.

Ainsworth attempted to arbitrate the quarrel between Francis and Thomasine Johnson on the one side and his brother George Johnson on the other, where George accused Thomasine of dressing immodestly and Francis of ruling the church tyrannically. Though he may initially have sympathised with George, on 15 January 1598, Ainsworth chaired a church meeting which censured him. Francis and Ainsworth also ex-communicated their elder Matthew Slade for refusing to stop going to services in the Dutch Reformed Church. Ainsworth himself caused some scandal when it emerged that he had twice submitted to the Church of England, but he was not disciplined.

Though often involved in controversy, Ainsworth was not arrogant, but was a steadfast and cultured champion of the principles represented by the early Congregationalists. Amid all the controversy, he steadily pursued his studies. The combination was so unique that some have mistaken him for two different individuals. Confusion has also been occasioned through his friendly controversy with one John Ainsworth, who left the Anglican for the Roman Catholic church.

In 1604, Johnson and Ainsworth wrote a petition for toleration of their church and took it to England in the hope of delivering it to James I. In their attempts to get it to the king, they rewrote it twice, and on their return to Amsterdam published all three versions under the title An Apologie or Defence of svch trve Christians as are commonly (vnjustly) called Brovvnists.

In 1610, Johnson changed his mind about the democratic Congregational structure of the Ancient Church, arguing that authority lay with the ministers, not the people. After nearly a year of debate, on 15 December, Ainsworth and his followers split from Johnson, and successfully sued them for possession of the church building. John Robinson tried to mediate between the two factions, but ended up taking Ainsworth's side.

In 1620, after Johnson's church had departed for North America, but before Robinson's had left on the Mayflower, Ainsworth's church considered joining the latter in their journey and put some money into the project. Robert Cushman criticised the proposal, saying 'Our liberty is to them as ratsbane, and their rigour as bad to us as the Spanish Inquisition.' Though nothing came of the plan, the Ainsworth church still waved the pilgrims off from Leiden.

== Personal life ==
On 29 April 1607, Ainsworth married Marjory Appelbey, a widow from Ipswich with one daughter. In 1612, the elder in the Ancient Church, Daniel Studley, was accused of ‘many lascivious attempts’ upon the girl, and confessed to having 'clapped' her.

Henry Ainsworth died in 1622, leaving unfinished works on Hosea, Matthew and Hebrews.

== Works ==
Ainsworth was one of the most able apologists of the so-called Brownist movement. His first solo work The communion of saincts (1607) is summarised by the historian of Separatism Stephen Tomkins as arguing 'that the true church is a holy community while a church that incorporates the entire population is neither holy nor a community'. Tomkins describes his second book Covnterpoyson (1608) as 'the most compelling apologia that the Separatist movement ever produced'. It was written in reply to the puritan minister John Sprint and to Richard Bernard's The Separatist Schisme.

Ainsworth also wrote reply to John Smyth, the Puritan leader who adopted credobaptism, entitled Defence of Holy Scripture, Worship and Ministry used in the Christian Churches separated from Antichrist, against the Challenges, Cavils and Contradictions of Mr Smyth (1609). Of Smyth's progression to concluding credobaptism, Ainsworth said he 'had gone ‘from error to error, and now at last to the abomination of Anabaptism’, which ‘in him was the worship … of the devil’.

His scholarly works include his Annotations—on Genesis (1616); Exodus (1617); Leviticus (1618); Numbers (1619); Deuteronomy (1619); Psalms (including a metrical version, 1612); and the Song of Solomon (1623). These were collected in folio in 1627. From the outset the Annotations took a commanding place, especially among continental scholars, establishing a scholarly tradition for English nonconformity. Tomkins notes that 'as late as 1866, W.S. Plumer's commentary on Psalms cited Ainsworth as an authority more than a hundred times and the 1885 (English) Revised Version of the Bible drew on his work.'

His publication of Psalms, The Book of Psalmes: Englished both in Prose and Metre with Annotations (Amsterdam, 1612), which includes thirty-nine separate monophonic psalm tunes, constituted the Ainsworth Psalter, thought to be the only book of music brought to New England in 1620 by the Pilgrim settlers. Although its content was later reworked into the Bay Psalm Book, it had an important influence on the early development of American psalmody. An early critic of the Brownists said that ‘by the uncouth and strange translation and metre used in them, the congregation was made a laughing stock’, while the 1885 Dictionary of National Biography said that Ainsworth ‘had not the faintest breath of poetical inspiration’.

Ainsworth died in 1622, or early in 1623, for in that year was published his Seasonable Discourse, or a Censure upon a Dialogue of the Anabaptists, in which the editor speaks of him as a departed worthy.

== Bibliography ==
- Ainsworth, Henry (1843), Annotations on the Pentateuch or the five books of Moses; the Psalms of David and the Song of Solomon : with a memoir of the author, vol. I (reprint ed.), Glasgow: Blackie & Son, OL 13993511M
- Ainsworth, Henry (1843), Annotations upon the Pentateuch Or the Five Books of Moses; the Psalms of David; and the Song of Solomon, vol. II (reprint ed.), Glasgow: Blackie & Son
- Ainsworth, Henry (1843), Annotations on the Pentateuch or the five books of Moses; the Psalms of David and the Song of Solomon : with a memoir of the author, vol. II (reprint ed.), Glasgow: Blackie & Son, OL 13993511M
- Ainsworth, Henry (1846), Annotations on the Pentateuch or the five books of Moses; the Psalms of David and the Song of Solomon : with a memoir of the author, vol. II, Glasgow: Blackie & Son, OL 13993513M
- Ainsworth, Henry (1613), An Animadversion to Mr. Richard Clyftons Advertisement, Amsterdam: Giles Thorp, pp. 138 p
- Ainsworth, Henry (1644), A seasonable discourse; or, A censure upon a dialogue of the Anabaptists, intitvled, A description of what God hath predestinated concerning man; is tryed and examined, wherein these seven points are handled & answered, viz. 1. Of predestination. 2. Of election. 3. Of Reprobation. 4. Of falling away. 5. Of freewill. 6. Of originall sinne. 7. Of baptizing infants .., London: Benjamin Allen, pp. 74 P, OL 24608151M
- Pratt, Waldo Selden (1921), The music of the Pilgrims; a description of the Psalm-book brought to Plymouth in 1620, Boston: O. Ditson Co., p. 80, LCCN 21012271, OL 7197710M
- Paget, John (1618), An arrovv against the separation of the Brownists. Also an admonition tovching Talmudique & rabbinical allegations (1618), Amsterdam, Printed by G. Veseler, OL 24649449M
- Paget, John (1641), A defence of church-government, exercised in presbyteriall, classicall, & synodall assemblies, according to the practise of the reformed churches : touching I. the power of a particular eldership against those that plead for a meere popular government, specially Mr Ainsvvorth in his Animadversion to Mr Clyft, &c. II. the authority of classes and synods, against the patrons of independencie, answering in this poynt Mr Davenport his Apologeticall reply, &c. and Mr Canne his Churches plea ..., London, OL 16875407M
