= Aaron Williams (composer) =

Aaron Williams (1731–1776) was a Welsh teacher, composer, and compiler of West Gallery music, active in Britain during the 18th century.

== Life ==
Williams was probably born in Caldicot, Monmouthshire, the son of William Morgan. He served as clerk of the Presbyterian Scots Church, London Wall.

== Publications ==
Williams's publications include:

- The Universal Psalmodist, 1763 (2nd ed., 1764; 3rd ed., 1765; 4th ed., 1770)
- [Daniel Bayley], The Royal Melody Complete, 3d ed., Boston, 1767 (an unauthorized compilation of music from William Tans'ur's Royal Melody Complete and Williams's Universal Psalmodist; subsequent editions, entitled The American Harmony, or Universal Psalmodist, were issued by Bayley in Newburyport, Massachusetts in 1769, 1771, 1773 and 1774).
- Royal Harmony; or, The Beauties of Church Music, ca. 1765
- Psalmody in Miniature, 1769 (2nd ed., in 3 books, 1778; supplements added in 1778 and 1780; 3rd ed., in 5 books, 1783)
- The New Universal Psalmodist, 1770 (6th ed., 1775)
- An Ode or Anthem for the New Year, 1770
- Two New Anthems for Christmas-Day, 1770
- Comfort ye, my people: A new Christmas anthem, 1775
- British Psalmody, London, ca. 1785

These publications included several fuguing tunes. Six of his anthems were included in Thomas Williams's Harmonia Coelestis (1780).

== Influence on early American sacred music ==
=== Harmonic idiom ===
The unorthodox harmonic idiom of the Yankee tunesmiths (the "First New England School" of choral composers) shows the influence of English composers such as Williams and William Tans'ur:

For the most part the Yankee composer's source of information about harmonic practices derived from the music and writings on music of such comparatively unskilled English composers as William Tans'ur (1796–1783) and Aaron Williams (1731–1776), who were themselves somewhat outside the mainstream of European sacred music. Many of the traits that may be thought unique to American psalmodists in fact characterize the compositions of their British cousins too.

In particular, "it is clear that [William Billings] had studied the works of English psalmodists such as William Tansur and Aaron Williams."

=== St. Thomas ===
Williams's tune "St. Thomas" was originally the second quarter of his longer "Holborn," published in his Universal Psalmodist (1763) and attributed to him based on the statement there, "never before printed." It was first published in its shortened form in Thomas Knibb's The Psalm-Singer's Help (c. 1769), included by Williams in his 1770 New Universal Psalmodist, and printed again in Isaac Smith's A Collection of Psalm Tunes (c. 1780).

In the United States, "St. Thomas" was published in several shape note tunebooks, including the following:

- William Little and William Smith, The Easy Instructor (1801), p. 101
- David Clayton and James Carrell, The Virginia Harmony (1831), p. 79 (attributed to "Handel")
- The Methodist Harmonist (1833), no. 119, p. 93
- Allen D. Carden, The Missouri Harmony (1834), p. 33
- W. L. Chappell, The Western Lyre, new edition, 1835, no. 80
- Lowell Mason and T. H. Mason, The Sacred Harp or Eclectic Harmony, new edition, 1835, p. 89
- B. F. White and E. J. King, The Sacred Harp, appendix to the 1860 edition, p. 293 (also in the 1911 edition of J. S. James, p. 293, misattributed to "William Towser, 1768"; retained in the current 1991 edition, p. 34).
