= Stoughton Musical Society =

Oldest US performing musical organization, in Stoughton, Massachusetts

Organized in 1786 as The Stoughton Musical Society, it is America's oldest performing musical organization. For over two centuries it has had many distinguished accomplishments. In 1908, when incorporated under the laws of the Commonwealth of Massachusetts, the name was changed to Old Stoughton Musical Society and it has retained that designation.

== Early years ==
From the inspiration of a singing school given in Stoughton in 1774 by Boston composer, William Billings, a group of male singers in town decided to form a singing society. There were 25 names and all of them listed in the membership journal with the date of organization being November 7, 1786. Their first President was Elijah Dunbar, 1740–1814, from Canton. He was also their conductor and a singer. The first music collection the musical society purchased was The Worcester Collection of Sacred Harmony compiled by Isaiah Thomas in 1786, which contained the first American printing of the Hallelujah Chorus from Handel's Messiah.

== Singing contest ==
According to the musical society's 1929 history book, the Stoughton singers met a chorus from the nearby First Parish Church in Dorchester about the year 1790. This is believed to be the first singing contest held in America. The Dorchester chorus consisting of men and women were accompanied by a bass viol, the Stoughton Musical Society had twenty selected male voices and sang without accompaniment. The Stoughton singers first performed Jacob French's anthem, The Heavenly Vision, which they performed from memory. Next, the Dorchester chorus performed an unidentified piece. Then the Stoughton singers performed Handel's majestic Hallelujah Chorus from his oratorio, Messiah, from memory and without any instrumental accompaniment. Following that performance, the Dorchester chorus acknowledged defeat and the Stoughton singers won the contest.

== Centennial celebration ==
On June 9, 1886, the Stoughton Musical Society celebrated its centennial with a full day of activities including a special dinner and an evening concert attended by both Governor George D. Robinson and Lieutenant Governor Oliver Ames. Gov. Robinson spoke glowingly about this centennial concert, ending with these remarks: "Let me commend, so far as my opinion can possibly extend, the fine production of this evening. It has afforded me real delight." The featured work for the concert was Haydn's oratorio, The Creation, for soloists, chorus and orchestra.

== World's fair concerts ==
One of their greatest achievements took place at the World's Columbian Exposition in Chicago in 1893. The Stoughton Musical Society's 100 musicians performed two concerts in the Music Hall. Both the singers and orchestra wore Colonial costumes. At the first concert on August 14, there were 2,000 people in attendance, more than had attended the symphony concerts conducted by Theodore Thomas. The music performed by the musical society consisted of 24 pieces by such 18th century New England composers as: William Billings, Oliver Holden, Jacob French, and Daniel Read. Some of these composers were later recorded by the Stoughton Musical Society on their LP album in 1975 titled "An Appeal to Heaven."

== Bicentennial celebration ==
The Old Stoughton Musical Society celebrated with a concert again featuring Haydn's Creation. The concert was held on November 7, 1986, exactly two hundred years after its founding date. Letters of congratulation were received from President Ronald Reagan, a Proclamation naming the concert date as "Old Stoughton Musical Society Day" in the Commonwealth of Massachusetts, signed by Governor Michael S. Dukakis, and an entry in the Congressional Record by Congressperson Joe Moakley of Massachusetts. A commemorative program was published which included "Notes from the Past", pictures of the chorus, and a hymn written by Bicentennial Chairman Roger L. Hall.

== Stoughton composers ==
The small town of Stoughton has produced a number of composers who have written music performed by the Stoughton Musical Society and other performing organizations:

- 18th century
  - Supply Belcher, b. 1751/ d. 1836 (Farmington, Maine)
  - Samuel Capen, b. 1745/ d. 1809 (Canton, Massachusetts)
  - Edward French, b. 1761/ d. 1845 (Sharon, Massachusetts)
  - Jacob French, b. 1754/ d. 1817 (Simsbury, Connecticut)
- 19th century
  - Alanson Belcher, b. 1810/ d. 1900 (Stoughton)
  - Edwin Arthur Jones, b. 1854/ d. 1911 (Stoughton) – his cantata for soloists, chorus and orchestra, Song of Our Saviour (1881), received its world premiere performance in Stoughton in 1992.
- 20th century
  - F. William Kempf, b. 1901/ d. 1950 (Stoughton)– one of his instrumental works, Suite Classique (1940) was performed by the Boston Pops, conducted by Arthur Fiedler.
  - Laura Shafer Gebhardt, b. 1885/ d. 1959 (Stoughton) – composed Flag of All Our Country for the bicentennial of the Town of Stoughton in 1926.
  - Roger Lee Hall, b. 1942 – composed several commemorative pieces, including Peace (1981/rev. 1990) and Dedication (1986).
