= Yankee tunesmiths =

Group of composers, active 1770–1810

Yankee tunesmiths (also called the First New England School) were self-taught composers active in New England from 1770 until about 1810. Their music was largely forgotten when the Better Music Movement turned musical tastes towards Europe, as in Thomas Hastings's 1822 Dissertation on Musical Taste and other works. The principal tunesmiths were William Billings, Supply Belcher, Daniel Read, Oliver Holden, Justin Morgan, Lewis Edson, Andrew Law, Timothy Swan, Jacob Kimball Jr., and Jeremiah Ingalls. They composed primarily psalm tunes and fuging tunes (which differ enough from European fugues to warrant the spelling "fuge"), many of which have entered into the Sacred Harp singing tradition.

== "Yankee tunesmiths" or "First New England School" ==
Shape note singers who have kept this music alive to the present day sometimes use the term "Yankee tunesmiths", as did academic musicologists such as H. Wiley Hitchcock (1966). Other scholars working from a classical music perspective worked backwards, beginning with research into the Boston Classicists ( "Boston Six") of the late-19th and early-20th centuries, who were first defined as a "school" in 1966, then Hitchcock explicitly defined as this group as the "Second New England School" in 1969, generating the term "First New England School" as a by-product. The Yankee tunesmiths were definitely not a "school": all were self taught, scattered across New England, and did not share common publishers or affiliations. All were craftsmen who worked part-time as itinerant singing school teachers, which gave them opportunities to sell their self-published tune books. Anglo-Celtic heritage, and love of metric psalmody and the hymns of Isaac Watts are other common characteristics.

== Antecedents in West Gallery Music ==
The self-taught Yankee tunesmiths learned composition from composers of West gallery music such as William Tans'ur's A New Musical Grammar (1746) and Aaron Williams. Their books were issued by Daniel Bayley in Newburyport, Massachusetts in 1769, 1771, 1773 and 1774 under the title The American Harmony, or Universal Psalmodist 1769, 1771, 1773 and 1774).

For the most part the Yankee composer's source of information about harmonic practices derived from the music and writings on music of such comparatively unskilled English composers as William Tans'ur (1706-1783) and Aaron Williams (1731-1776), who were themselves somewhat outside the mainstream of European sacred music. Many of the traits that may be thought unique to American psalmodists in fact characterize the compositions of their British cousins too.

== William Billings ==
The first influential tunesmith was William Billings (1746–1800), a native of Boston, who was a self-taught amateur musician and a tanner. William Billings was part of the colonial working class. At the age of twenty-three Billings had already composed more than one hundred original pieces of sacred music, and in 1770 he published his a tunebook, The New England Psalm Singer, the first book in which all the compositions were by an American. He advertised the work as “never before published” and stressed that it was composed by “a native of Boston”—made in America by an American. Published by Benjamin Edes and John Gill, who also published The Boston Gazette and Country Journal, a major Patriot newspaper, and including an engraving by Paul Revere. Here we find the defiant, "Chester", sometimes called "America's First National Anthem", for which Billings composed both the lyrics and the tune:

Let tyrants shake their iron rod

And slav'ry Clank her galling Chains

We fear them not, we trust in God

New England's God for ever reigns.

The New England Psalm-Singer (1770) was followed by a second and more popular collection, the Singing Master's Assistant (1778). It includes a paraphrase of Psalm 137 ("By the rivers of Watertown," instead of "Babylon") that refers to the British occupation of Boston in 1775–1776. These selections captured the mood of confident defiance with which New England patriots entered the new era.

== Rediscovery ==
The works of the early New England composers were rediscovered in the 1950s, with compositions such as William Schuman's use of Billings' tune "Chester" in his New England Triptych (1956), which he later expanded into the Chester Overture.
