= William Tans'ur =

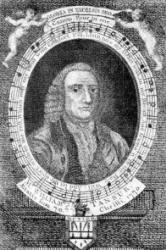
William Tans'ur

William Tans'ur (or Tansur, Tanzer, Letansur; 6 November 1706 – 7 October 1783) was an English hymn-writer, composer of West gallery music, and teacher of music. His output includes approximately a hundred hymn tunes and psalm settings and a Te Deum. His manual A New Musical Grammar (1746) was still popular in the nineteenth century.

== Life ==
Tans'ur was born in Dunchurch, Warwickshire to Edward Tanzer, a labourer, and Joan Alibone. In 1730 he married Elizabeth Butler and moved to Ewell, near Epsom. They had at least two sons. He taught psalmody in various places in the south-east of England, before moving to St Neots in Cambridgeshire, where he worked as a bookseller and music teacher, and spent the last forty years of his life. One of his sons was a chorister at Trinity College, Cambridge and as an adult was also a bookseller and music teacher.

== Works ==
- A Compleat Melody, or The Harmony of Sion, 1734 in which is found the tune 'Bangor' set in the New English Hymnal (#270) to the hymn 'According to thy gracious word' or in Hymns Ancient & Modern New Standard (#469) to the hymn 'God, you have giv'n us power to sound'.
- The Melody of the Heart, 1737
- Heaven on earth, or the Beauty of Holiness, 1738
- Sacred Mirth, or the Pious Soul's Daily Delight, 1739
- Poetical Meditations, 1740
- The Universal Harmony, containing the Whole Book of Psalms, 1743
- A New Musical Grammar, 1746
- The Royal Melody Compleat, 1754–5 (8 editions, and revised in 1771 as The American Harmony)
- The Psalm Singer's Jewel, or Useful Companion to the Book of Psalms, 1760
- Melodia Sacra, or the Devout Psalmist's Musical Companion, 1771
- The Elements of Music Displayed, 1772

== Influence on early American sacred music ==
The unorthodox harmonic idiom of the Yankee tunesmiths ("First New England School") of choral composers shows the influence of English composers such as Tans'ur and Aaron Williams:

For the most part the Yankee composer's source of information about harmonic practices derived from the music and writings on music of such comparatively unskilled English composers as William Tans'ur (1706-1783) and Aaron Williams (1731-1776), who were themselves somewhat outside the mainstream of European sacred music. Many of the traits that may be thought unique to American psalmodists in fact characterize the compositions of their British cousins too.

In particular, "it is clear that [William Billings] had studied the works of English psalmodists such as William Tansur and Aaron Williams."
