= Lewis Edson =

American composer

Lewis Edson (22 January 1748 – 1820 in Woodstock, New York) was one of the first American composers. He began working as blacksmith, but soon after became a singing master and was a notable singer in his day. His most popular compositions were Bridgewater, Lenox and Green Field and were published in 1782 in the "Choristers Companion".

== List of works ==
- Bridgewater – choral hymn
- Lenox – choral hymn View Score at Hymnary.org
- Newton – choral hymn
- Green Field – choral hymn

== Scores ==
Volume 3. Three New York Composers: The Collected Works of Lewis Edson, Lewis Edson, Jr., and Nathaniel Billings, edited by Karl Kroeger. ISBN 0-8153-2170-8
