= Jacob French =

American composer (1754–1817)

- Born: July 15, 1754; Stoughton, Massachusetts
- Died: May 1817 (aged 62) Simsbury, Connecticut
- Occupation: Composer

Jacob French (July 15, 1754 – May 1817) was a singing master and one of the first American composers, sometimes called Yankee tunesmiths. "A student of William Billings, French adopted Billings' innovative approach to psalmody ... His music tends to be more complex in its structure, rhythm, and counterpoint than most of his contemporaries." "Along with William Billings, he is regarded as one of the finest composer of anthems in the New England tradition." French's Farewell Anthem appears in Southern Harmony, 1835, as well as The Sacred Harp from 1844 to the present. He was born in Stoughton, Massachusetts. His brother, Edward, also composed a few tunes.

Some of French's choral music was adapted by American composer John Cage for his Apartment House 1776 and subsequently arranged for string quartet as part of 44 Harmonies by violinist Irvine Arditti. These were recorded and issued by Mode Records along with adaptations by Cage of other Colonial-period hymnists.

== Publications ==
- The New American Melody (1789)
- The Psalmodist's Companion (1793)
- Harmony of Harmony (1802)

== List of works ==
- Heavenly Vision
- Beauty
- Dormant
- Happiness
- Farewell Anthem

(Scores available at the Choral Public Domain Library)

== Discography ==
- Sweet Seraphic Fire - New England Singing School Music
- Make A Joyful Noise - The New England Harmony
- The Heavenly Vision - Old Stoughton Music Sampler
