= West gallery music =

Christian music genre

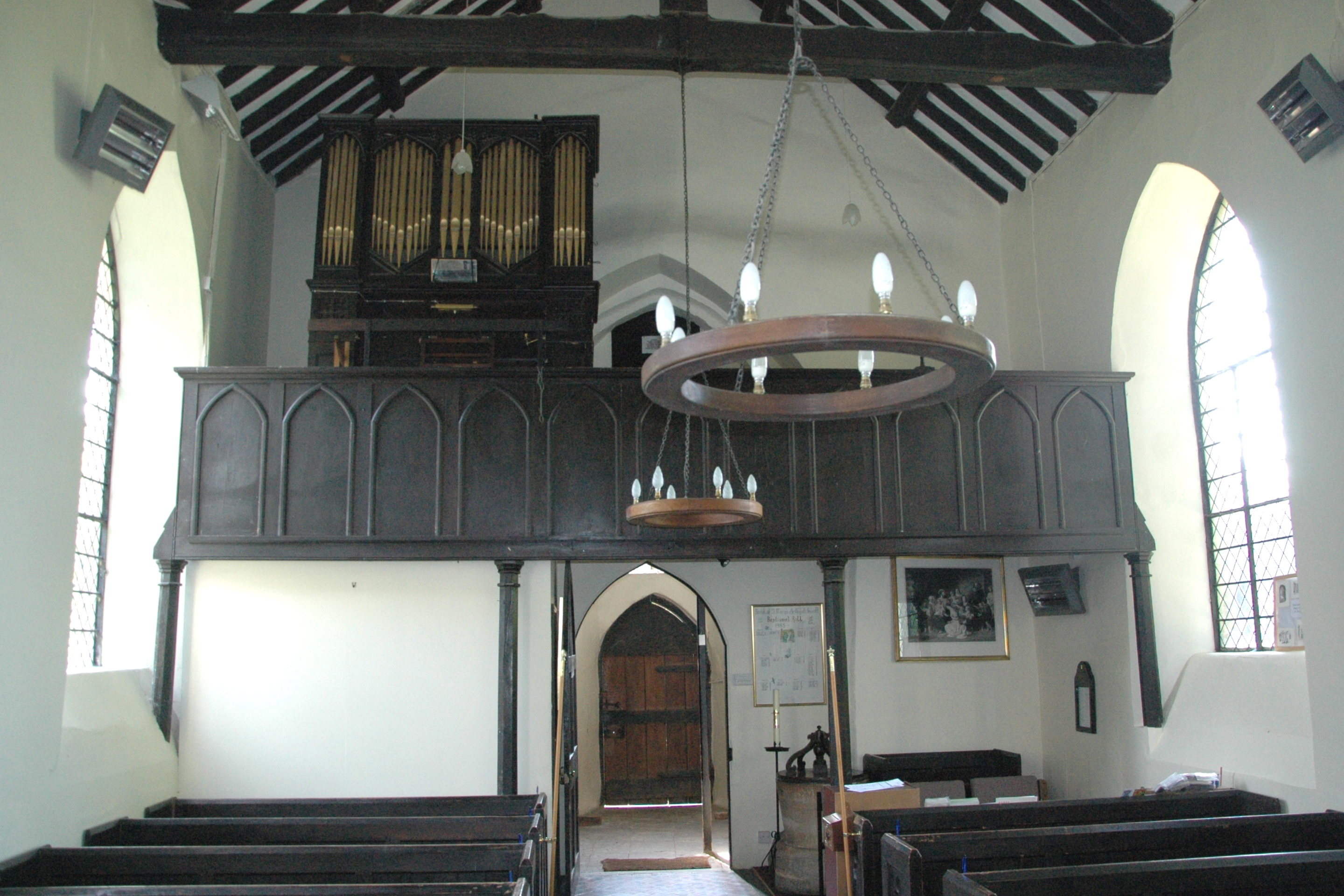
West gallery in St. Mary's church, Ardley, Oxfordshire

West gallery music, also known as Georgian psalmody, is the sacred music (metrical psalms, with a few hymns and anthems) sung and played in Church of England parish churches, as well as nonconformist chapels, from 1700 to around 1850. In the late 1980s, west gallery music experienced a revival and is now sung by several west gallery "quires" (choirs).

The term "west gallery" derives from the wooden galleries which in the 18th century were constructed at the west end of typical churches, and from which the choir would perform. Churches were built in a standard layout, with the nave running from east-west away from the altar, so that the west gallery or choir, would face the altar, the same way as, but above, the church-goers. Victorians disapproved of the Georgian galleries, and most were removed during restorations in the 19th century.

== History ==
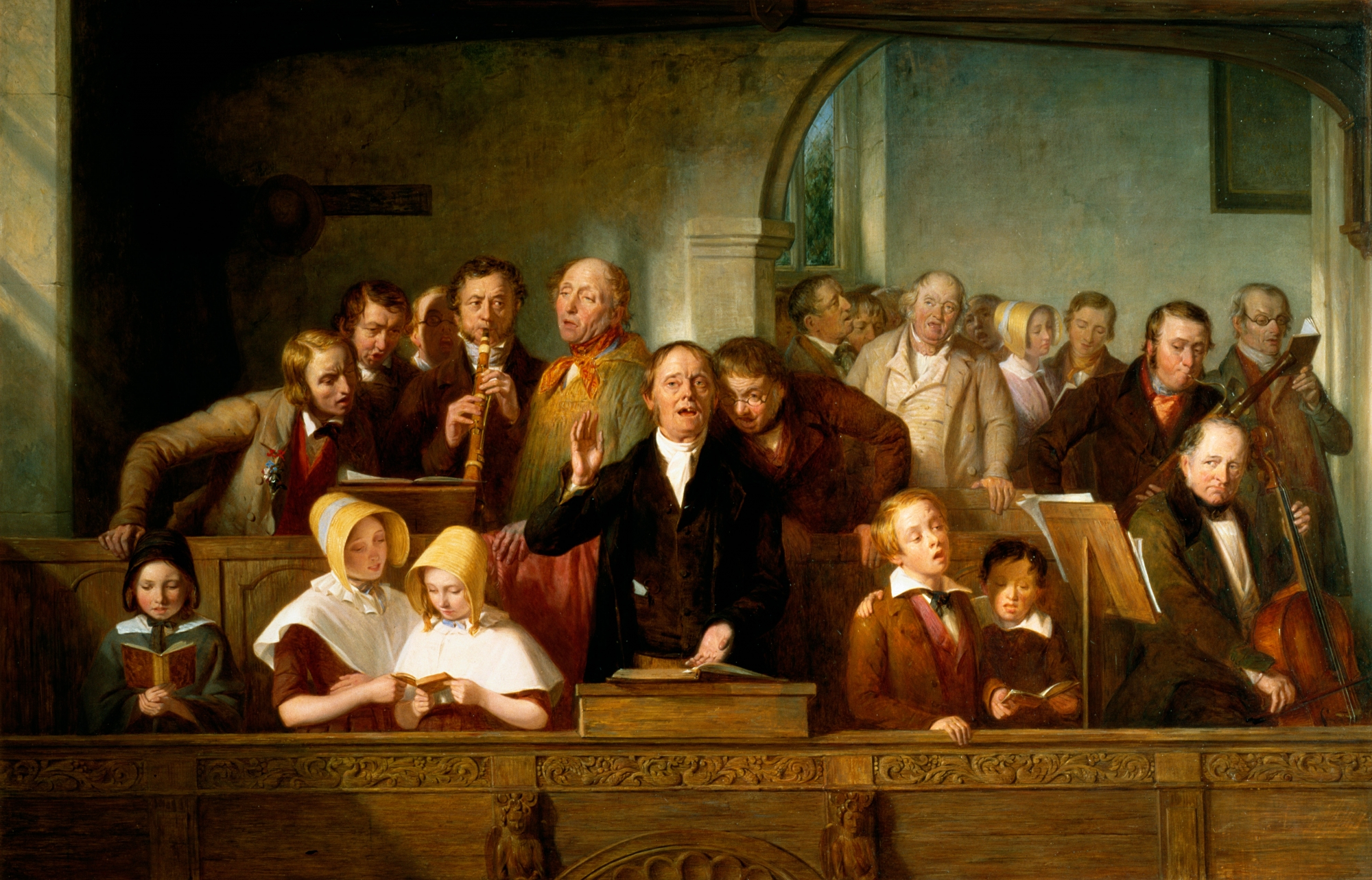
A Village Choir, an 1847 painting by Thomas Webster

By the 1700s, many church goers were unsatisfied by the state of congregational singing, which resulted in the formation of amateur choirs, which were initially male. In rural English churches, congregations often lacked an organ, but still needed support in order to maintain pitch in complex music. From the mid 1700s, we see this practice initially by the presence of an accompanying bass instrument and later a small band that was flexible regarding instrumentation but most commonly consisted of flutes, clarinets, bassoons, cellos, and violins. Originally, instrumentalists would double the vocal parts, but later, more complex music was added with specific instrumentation, such as small symphonies.

The repertory consisted mainly of metrical psalms and anthems, and fuguing tunes were particularly common in the mid-18th century. Many teachers, such as Michael Beesly and William Tans'ur sold their own psalmody, and borrowed freely from each other. In addition, many musicians made their own manuscript compilations due to the prohibitive cost of printed books. Most of these composers were also amateurs and often learned from other psalmodists, although, some may have been conventionally trained. This lack of training resulted in peculiar compositions, and early repertoire was based on linear composition from the Renaissance, often using open fifths and false relations. Some additional characteristics of this music include unexpected dissonances, consecutive fifths and octaves, great originality, intensive word painting, strong melodic lines, and the prevalence of the tenor voice, often doubled an octave higher by treble voices. Gallery music was viewed as a financially viable genre by many professional composers, such as John Alcock (elder and younger), Capel Bond, William Hayes the elder and Samuel Webbe the elder, who all published psalmody books.

English country psalmody was exported to America around the mid 18th century, where it inspired the creation of many new compositions by members of the First New England School. Some of these works have remained in use in shape note traditions, for example in the Sacred Harp repertoire. The 4-part, tenor-led harmony, fuguing tunes and anthems and other aspects strongly helped influence the shape note musical tradition, and in many ways the American music style is directly evolved from the older one.

Use of west gallery music in the Church dwindled in part due to the rise of urbanization and also due to the desire for a more polite, more formal style of worship. This more formal style of worship culminated in the Oxford Movement, and eventually the Hymns Ancient and Modern (1861). Furthermore, the old church bands were often difficult for a vicar to control, while influence over an organist was a much easier task. Such an ousting of the band by an organist is given a fictional treatment in Thomas Hardy’s early novel Under the Greenwood Tree, which reflected actual events at Hardy’s church at Stinsford. Another possible reason for this is that when the Methodists split from the Anglican church, many of these bands would have been split apart, or even leaving en masse.

In 1893, the Reverend Francis William Galpin described the church band at Winterbourne Abbas, which he believed was the last surviving example in England; however, two years later, a survey of parishes in Cornwall found that 18 out of 219 churches still had a band.

=== West gallery composers ===
- John Arnold (1720–1792), who published The Compleat Psalmodist (1741)
- Thomas Clark (1775–1859)
- John Fawcett (1789–1867)
- John Foster (1752–1822)
- Edward Harwood (1707–1787)
- Thomas Jarman (1776-1861)
- Joseph Nicholds (c. 1785–1860)
- William Tans'ur (1706–1783)
- Aaron Williams (1731–1776)
- Joseph Williams (c. 1800–1834)

=== Composers and compilers in related traditions ===
- Robert Bremner (c. 1713–1789), who was influential in mid-18th century Scottish psalmody
- Charles Woodmason (c. 1720–1789), an Anglican clergyman and tune-book compiler

== See also ==
- Anglican church music
- Larks of Dean, chapel musicians in 18th & 19th-century Lancashire
- Sing Lustily and with Good Courage, a recording including west gallery hymns
- Tate and Brady
