= William Selby =

- Born: 1738; London, England
- Died: 1798 (aged 59) Boston, Massachusetts, U.S.
- Occupations: church musician, composer
- Instrument: organ
- Years active: 1755–1798

William Selby (1738–1798) was an English organist, harpsichordist, choirmaster and composer who emigrated to America.

== Early life ==
Born in England and baptised in London on 1 January 1739, Selby was the third known son of Joseph and Mary Selby. Beginning at the age of 17, he held several positions in London as organist including at St Sepulchre-without-Newgate (1760–1770) and also at the now demolished All Hallows, Bread Street (1756–73). He was also organist to the Magdalen Hospital (1766–9). Selby published both sacred and secular music between 1665 and 1670, most notably the nine psalm and hymn settings included in A Second Collection of Psalms and Hymns Used at the Magdalen Chapel (c 1770), which also included works by Thomas Arne. His hunting song The Chace of the Hare was often reprinted.

== American career ==
Selby emigrated to Boston, Massachusetts in October 1773 at the age of 35. (He was following in the footsteps of his brother John, also an organist, who emigrated in 1771). In 1774, Selby became the organist at Trinity Church in Newport, Rhode Island. Three years later, Selby became organist at King's Chapel in Boston where he organized the first colonial music festival.

Selby's surviving works include two voluntaries and one Fugue for the organ, a lesson in C for the harpsichord, and an anthem for Thanksgiving Day. His Boston compositions included a Jubilate and three anthems, including Behold, he is my salvation, composed for the rededication of Old South Church, Boston. The patriotic choral ode To Columbia’s Favourite Son, was performed at the Stone Chapel in 1786, in the presence of President Washington.

Over his career he published nine psalms and hymns for solo voice, eight choral works (both religious and secular), six songs, nine solo pieces for guitar and three for keyboard. In addition to his musical endeavors, he managed a grocery and liquor shop.
