= John Christopher Moller =

American composer (1755–1803)

John Christopher Moller (1755 – September 21, 1803) was one of the first American composers, as well as one of the first music publishers in the United States.

== Biography ==
Moller was also an organist, concert manager, pianist, harpsichordist, and violinist. He was born in Germany and emigrated to Philadelphia in 1790 after spending almost 10 years in England and some time in New York. In 1796, he returned to New York where he was a manager of New York City concerts as well as serving as organist for Trinity Episcopal Church. He remained there for the rest of his life.

== List of works ==
- Philiapdelphia Sonata II in E major (Nabore Performing Edition-Orpheo Music Ltd.)
- Meddley : with the most favorite airs and variations / composed by J. C. Moller Philadelphia : G. Willig's Musical Magazine, between 1795 and 1797
- Rondo : third number / by I. C. Moller Philadelphia : G. Willig, between 1798 and 1804 – Score

=== Discography ===
- Alexandre Reinagle, John Christopher Moller, James Hewitt – American Piano Music of the 18th century – William Grant Nabore by Doron Music
