= Ainsworth Psalter =

Book by Henry Ainsworth

The Ainsworth Psalter was written by English Separatist clergyman Henry Ainsworth and was brought to America by the Pilgrims in 1620. It was published in Holland in 1612. It is a parallel translation, including a literal rendering of the Psalms and an accompanying metrical Psalms.
