= Jacob Kimball Jr. =

American composer (1761–1826)

Jacob Kimball Jr. born on February 15, 1761, and died in Topsfield, Massachusetts July 24, 1826 was one of the first American composers. He played fife and drum in the American Revolutionary War and participated in Battle of Lexington and Bunker Hill.

== List of works ==
- Invitation (1784) ("Hark! the Redeemer from on high") Sacred Harp p327
- Brentwood (1800) Hesperian Harp p196
- Tunbridge (1800) Hesperian Harp p88
- Woburn (1793) ("Firm was my health, my day was bright") Shenandoah Harmony p407

== Discography ==
- Woburn - Sweet Seraphic Fire New England Singing School Music
- Invitation - Make A Joyful Noise: American Psalmody by American Anonymous

== Tunebooks ==
- The Rural Harmony (1793)
- The Village Harmony (1798)
- The Essex Harmony (1800)

== Bibliography ==
- Selected Works of Samuel Holyoke (1762–1820) and Jacob Kimball (1761–1826), eds Harry Eskew and Karl Kroeger
