= Jeremiah Ingalls =

American composer (1764–1838)

- Born: March 1, 1764; Andover, Massachusetts
- Died: 6 April 1838 (aged 74); Hancock, Vermont
- Occupation: Composer
- Spouse: Mary Bigelow
- Father: Abijah Ingalls

Jeremiah Ingalls (March 1, 1764 – April 6, 1838) was an early North-American composer, considered a part of the First New England School.

== Biography ==
Jeremiah Ingalls was born in Andover, Massachusetts, in 1764. When he was thirteen, his father, Abijah Ingalls, died of hardships suffered during the American Revolutionary War. In 1791, Ingalls married Mary Bigelow of Westminster, Massachusetts, and while living in Vermont worked variously as a farmer, cooper, taverner and choirmaster. Ingalls served as the choirmaster at the Congregational Church in Newbury, Vermont from 1791 to 1805, and the choir gained a reputation attracting many people from the surrounding area. In 1805 Ingalls published The Christian Harmony. Ingalls served as a deacon in the church, but in 1810, he was excommunicated from that congregation. In 1819 he moved to Rochester, Vermont and then Hancock, Vermont. Ingalls was described as short and corpulent with a high voice and an advanced skill at the bass viol. Many of Ingalls' family members were also known for their musical ability. Ingalls died in Hancock, Vermont, in 1838, aged 74.

== List of tunes ==
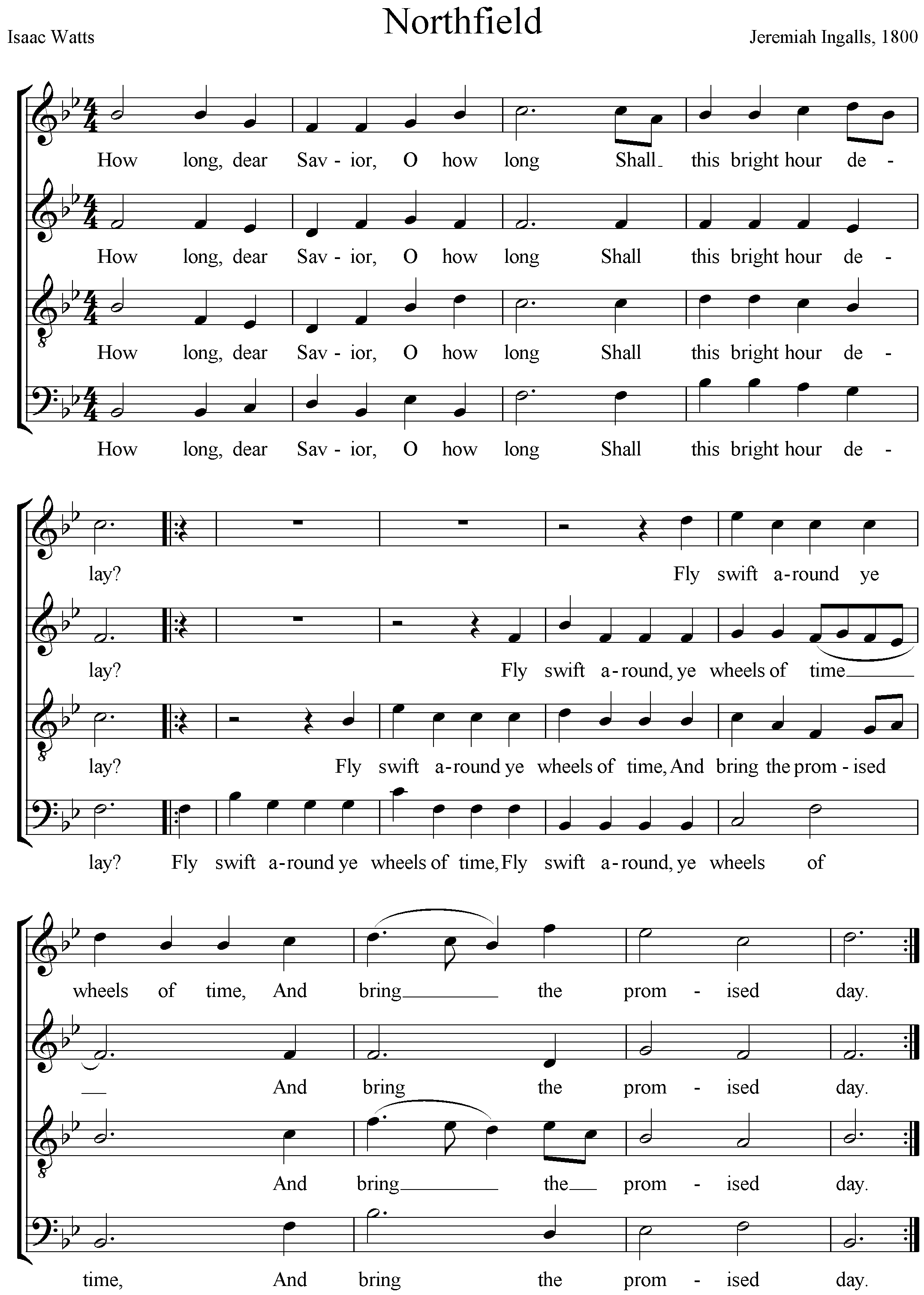
Northfield, by Jeremiah Ingalls

Northfield, by Jeremiah Ingalls

- Northfield
- Christian Song
- New Jerusalem
- Fillmore
- Apple Tree
- Redemption
- Pennsylvania

== Publications ==
- The Christian Harmony; or, Songster's Companion, Jeremiah Ingalls, (Exeter, NH, Henry Ranlet, 1805)
  - "Connexion" and Jeremiah Ingalls Society Bicentennial Edition, 1805–2005 of The Christian Harmony or Songster's Companion, Thomas B. Malone, ed. This four-shape version, published for the Jeremiah Ingalls Society Bicentennial Singing in Newbury, Vermont, is increasingly in use in New England singings.
