= Oliver Holden =

American composer and compiler of hymns

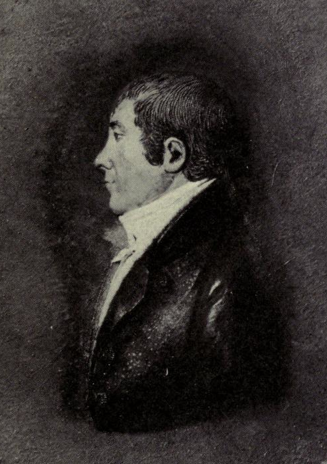
Portrait of Holden by J. C. Rauschner, ca. 1810

Oliver Holden (September 18, 1765 – September 4, 1844) was an American composer and compiler of hymns.

== Biography ==
He was born in Shirley, Massachusetts. During the American Revolutionary War, he was a marine for a year (1782–1783) on the USS Deane, which returned to Boston with at least one British prize while he was in the crew. For his service, he received an annual pension. A carpenter by trade, in 1786 he moved to Charlestown, Massachusetts, to help rebuild it after the war. A carpenter and real estate dealer in his professional life, he also organized many music schools, and served as legislator and pastor.

He was a Baptist. In 1791 he joined the First Baptist Church in Boston and became leader of the choir. In 1801, he and some others started the First Baptist Church in Charlestown. He was in a group that left that church in 1809, due to what they perceived as lax discipline, and started a Second Baptist Church in Charlestown.

He entered King Solomon's Lodge as a freemason in 1795, and was an active member for ten years. He was in the Massachusetts House of Representatives on behalf of his town in 1818, 1825, 1826, and 1828 to 1833. His mansion, which he built around 1800, later became the Oliver Holden School, a kindergarten of Boston.

== Books ==
While working as a carpenter, Holden published The American Harmony (1793), a book of sacred music, mostly original, arranged in three and four parts. Soon afterward followed Union Harmony, or a Universal Collection of Sacred Music (1793 & 1801) and The Massachusetts Compiler (1795). He wrote the last-named work with Hans Gram and Samuel Holyoke. He edited The Worcester Collection of Sacred Harmony (1797), a sixth edition, altered, revised, and corrected, with an appendix containing new psalm-tunes; it was printed upon movable types that had been procured from England in 1786, by Isaiah Thomas, of Worcester, and is the oldest music book that was thus printed.

When George Washington visited Boston in 1789, Holden wrote the lyrics and score of an ode, and trained the choir which sang the music that greeted Washington at the Old State House. This chorus was performed again by the Stoughton Musical Society in their concerts at the Chicago World's Exposition in 1893 His popular tune "Coronation", to Edward Perronet's hymn "All Hail the Power of Jesus' Name", is said to be the earliest American hymn tune still in general use. Also of note is his hymn "Confidence".

== See also ==
- Yankee tunesmiths
