= Timothy Swan =

Yankee tunesmith and hatmaker (1758–1842)

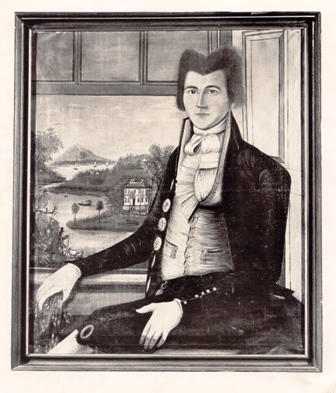
- Portrait of Timothy Swan
- Born: July 23, 1758; Worcester, Province of Massachusetts Bay, British North America
- Died: July 23, 1842 (aged 84); Northfield, Massachusetts, U.S.
- Occupations: Composer; Hatter; singing teacher; poet
- Years active: c. 1774–1807
- Known for: Yankee tunesmith; New England Harmony (1801); The Songster's Assistant (c. 1786)
- Spouse: Mary Gay (m. 1784)
- Children: 10
- Military career
- Allegiance: United States
- Branch: Continental Army
- Service years: 1774–1775
- Rank: Fifer
- Conflicts: American Revolutionary War

Timothy Swan (July 23, 1758 – July 23, 1842) was a Yankee tunesmith and hatmaker born in Worcester, Massachusetts. The son of goldsmith William Swan, Swan lived in small towns along the Connecticut River in Connecticut and Massachusetts for most of his life. Swan's compositional output consisted mostly of psalm and hymn settings, referred to as psalmody. These tunes and settings were produced for choirs and singing schools located in Congregationalist communities of New England. Swan is unique among early American composers in that he composed secular vocal duets and songs in addition to sacred tunebook music. The tunebook, New England Harmony is a collection of his sacred music compositions, while The Songster's Assistant is a collection of his secular music. Swan was also a poet and teacher of singing.

== Early life ==
Born July 23, 1758, Timothy Swan was the eighth child of the goldsmith William and Lavinia Swan of Worcester, Massachusetts. Not much is known of Swan's early years other than he resided in Worcester until his father's death in 1774. After the death of his father, Swan was apprenticed to a "Mr. Barnes" of Marlborough, Massachusetts. Barnes, an "importer of foreign goods" was a loyalist who eventually left the colonies to return to England as relations between the two became increasingly strained. This caused an end to Swan's brief apprenticeship in Marlborough.

=== Groton and the singing school ===
After leaving Barnes' employ, Swan moved to Groton, Massachusetts to live with his older brother William. Timothy's elder brother had an active interest in music and may have influenced his brother. Shortly after arriving in Groton, Swan enrolled in a singing school that was taught by a "Mr. Gross". This experience is probably the only formal musical education that Swan ever had.

== Career ==
=== Cambridge and Northfield ===
In 1774, Swan left Groton to enlist in the Continental Army located in Cambridge, Massachusetts. It was here that he learned to play fife under the tutelage of a British Fifer. In 1775, a little less than a year after enlisting at Cambridge, Swan moved to Northfield, Massachusetts. It was here that Swan became apprenticed as a hatter with his brother-in-law Caleb Lyman. It is here in Northfield that Swan's attention focused on musical composition. His first composition "Montague" can be placed around 1774 when Swan was sixteen years old.

After completing his apprenticeship in 1780, Swan moved to Enfield, Connecticut and then to Suffield, Connecticut, two years later in 1782. It was in Suffield that Swan composed most of his music.

=== Singing schools and tunebooks ===
Supplementing his work as a hatter, Swan began teaching singing-schools in the area. It was during this time that his music was first printed. In 1783, composer-compiler Oliver Brownson included six of Swan's tunes in the third issue of Select Harmony. This was followed by requests from other compilers and publishers to include Swan's tunes in their tunebooks and other publications. By 1800, his tunes were being printed in larger areas: New York, Virginia, New Hampshire, Pennsylvania, Maryland, Massachusetts, and Connecticut.

This rise in interest in his music prompted Swan to publish his music himself. Collaborating with Alexander Ely, Swan published The Songster's Assistant in ca. 1786. The tunebook was a collection of secular duets. Swan contributed half of the songs in the collection.

In 1801, he published New England Harmony. Unlike The Songster's Assistant, New England Harmony was a collection of sacred music. The tune book contained over 104 pages of original music. The collection contained many tunes that had been previously printed including his first tune Montague. The tunebook was not well received and Swan did not publish another collection after 1801. Even though the last tunebook did do well, Swan's music was still in demand and was published in later compilations by other tunebook compilers.

== Later life ==
In October 1807, 25 years after settling in Suffield, Swan and his family moved back to the town of his childhood. The reason for the move is not known; however, the decision may have been prompted by his mother's failing health. She died six years later in 1813. Upon returning to Northfield, Swan went into business with his nephew Josiah Dwight Lyman as milliners. Swan continued to compose music and receive requests from other compilers seeking to purchase the copyright of some of his more popular tunes.

== Personal life ==
In Suffield, Swan was introduced to Mary Gay, the daughter Ebenezer Gay, third minister of the First Congregational Church of Suffield. Swan may have been introduced to Miss Gay by his brother Benjamin Swan who was married to Lucy Gay, Mary's sister. His marriage to Mary on May 5, 1784, produced a large family similar to his own, ten children several of which were musicians like their father.

== Death ==
On July 23, 1842, at the age of 84, Timothy Swan died in his sleep in Northfield. Around the time of his death the style of psalmody that he composed had given way to more "proper" compositions more along the lines of the European school of musical composition. An obituary published in the Boston Daily Advertiser, dated August 5, 1842, noted, "Timothy Swan, 82, generally known to the public as the author of China and other pieces of sacred music, which have [so] long held a place in successive musical collections, that they have seemed to belong to an age long gone by."

== List of works ==
- New England Harmony (1801)
- The Songster's Assistant (ca. 1786)

== Sources ==
- Cooke, Nym. ed. (1997). Timothy Swan: Psalmody And Secular Songs. Music of the United States of America, vol. 6. Madison, Wisconsin: A-R Editions.
- -------- "Timothy Swan" in Grove Music Online. Oxford Music Online.
- Hall, Roger L. ed. The Stoughton Musical Society's Centennial Collection of Sacred Music. Ditson & Company, 1878. Reprint, DaCapo Press, 1980.
- Hudson, Charles. History of the Town of Marlborough from Its Earliest Settlement in 1657 to 1861. Boston, Massachusetts, 1862.
- Langosch, Marlene. "The Published Works of Timothy Swan (1758-1842)." MMA Thesis. Bloomington, Indiana: Indiana University Press, 1968.
- Murray, Sterling E. "Timothy Swan and Yankee Psalmody" The Musical Quarterly 61, no.3. (July 1975), pp. 433–60.
- "Obituary", Boston Daily Advertiser, Boston, Massachusetts, August 5, 1842, pp. 235–36.
- Records of the Congregational Church in Suffield, Connecticut, 1710-1836. Hartford, Connecticut: 1941.
- Sonneck, Oscar G. Bibliography of Early Secular American Music (18th Century). Revised by William T. Upton, New York: Da Capo Press, 1964.
- Temple, Josiah Howard and George Sheldon. A History of Town of Northfield, Massachusetts, for 150 Years, with An Account of the Prior Occupation of the Territory by the Squakheags and with Family Genealogies" Albany, New York: Joel Munsell, 1875.
- Webster, E. "Timothy Swan." Manuscript Memoir, in Swan Papers, American Antiquarian Society, Worcester, Massachusetts: 1842.
