= Justin Morgan =

American horse breeder, composer and singing master (1747–1798)

- Born: 28 February 1747; West Springfield, Massachusetts Bay, British Empire.
- Died: 22 March 1798 (aged 51); Randolph, Vermont, U.S.
- Resting place: Randolph Center Cemetery, Vermont
- Occupations: Horse breeder, composer, singing teacher
- Known for: Founder of the Morgan horse breed; composer of early American hymns
- Notable work: "Amanda", "Montgomery", "Judgment Anthem"
- Spouse: Martha Day
- Children: Polly Morgan and others

Justin Morgan (February 28, 1747 – March 22, 1798) was a U.S. horse breeder and composer.

He was born in West Springfield, Massachusetts, and by 1788 had settled in Vermont. In addition to being a horse breeder and farmer, he was a teacher of singing; in that capacity he traveled considerably throughout the northeastern states. He died in Randolph, Vermont, where he also served as town clerk.

Justin Morgan was the owner of a stallion named Figure, who became the sire of the Morgan horse breed. Morgan received Figure along with two other horses as payment of a debt. As Figure grew older, people began to recognize his skill in a variety of areas. Figure became a prolific breeding stallion; his descendants, still noted for their versatility and friendly personality, became the first American breed of horse to survive to the present. Figure's grave is marked by a stone in Tunbridge, Vermont.

Justin Morgan's original 1798 gravestone is preserved in the Randolph Historical Society Museum. His burial site in the Randolph Center Cemetery is marked by a more recent stone.

== Music ==
Morgan was a composer, best known for his hymns and fuguing tunes. While not so famous as those by William Billings, his works share the same characteristic roughness, directness, and folk-like simplicity.

Publications containing his work include The Federal Harmony (New Haven, 1790), and The Philadelphia Harmony, 4th ed. (Philadelphia, 1791). The former collection includes what perhaps is his most famous composition entitled, "Amanda," a setting of Isaac Watts's poem based on Psalm 90. This hymn was the basis for a classical work written by American composer Thomas Canning in 1946, "Fantasy on a Hymn Tune by Justin Morgan." The tune "Despair," in the 1791 collection, cites the death of "Amanda" (referring to his wife, Martha Day, who died on March 20 that year, ten days after giving birth to their youngest daughter, Polly) in a paraphrase of Alexander Pope's Ode on Solitude.

Morgan's setting of Psalm 63, entitled Montgomery, was a popular fuguing tune, included among the 100 hymn-tunes most frequently printed during the eighteenth century. Four of his tunes, including Montgomery, are in the 1991 edition of The Sacred Harp; three more songs, including "Amanda" and "Despair," both grieving over the death of his wife, are in the Shenandoah Harmony. Its voice-leading, as is common in works by early American composers, contains numerous unabashed parallel fifths, giving the music a folk-like quality. Another work of his, the Judgment Anthem, is tonally adventurous, moving back and forth between E minor and E♭ major; it was the first anthem published in shape notes, appearing in Little and Smith's The Easy Instructor (1801), and many tunebooks thereafter.

== In literature ==
Morgan and his horse-breeding venture is the subject of a children's book by Marguerite Henry, Justin Morgan Had a Horse, that won the Newbery Honor in 1946. In 1972, the book was adapted as a film by Disney Studios.

== References and further reading ==
- Nym Cooke: "Justin Morgan", Grove Music Online ed. L. Macy (Accessed December 3, 2005), (subscription access)
- W. Thomas Marrocco and Harold Gleason, eds. Music in America. New York, W.W. Norton & Co., 1964.
- Betty Bandel: "Sing the Lord's Song in a Strange Land, The Life of Justin Morgan". With musical appendix by James G. Chapman. Fairleigh Dickinson University Press, 1981
- Curler, Elizabeth (2010). "Justin Morgan the Man". The National Museum of the Morgan Horse.
