= James Lyon (composer) =

James Lyon (July 1, 1735 – October 12, 1794) was an American composer of the colonial and Federal eras in New England.

== Life ==
James Lyon was born in Newark, New Jersey on July 1, 1735. It is known that his father was Zopher Lyon, but that he was orphaned at an early age. In 1750, Isaac Lyon and John Crane became James' guardians, until the age of twenty-one. Lyon then attended college at Nassau Hall, and afterwards obtained a master's degree from College of Philadelphia. Lyon became a Presbyterian minister, and left from Philadelphia for Nova Scotia, but he was unable to support his family, and subsequently accepted a job at the new settlement of Machias, Maine. After his first year there, the parish invited him to remain at a raised salary and he remained there with a few interruptions, until his death on October 12, 1794.

== Music ==
The first evidence of Lyon composing was during his college days at the commencement of 1759 at Nassau Hall, when President Samuel Davies delivered an oration, and where the ceremony concluded with an ODE, set to music by Lyon. In 1761, when a candidate for a master's degree at the College of Philadelphia, one of his works was performed on the same program as an Ode by Francis Hopkinson. While living in Philadelphia, Lyon produced his Urania, or A Choice Collection of Psalm-Tunes, Anthems and Hymns in 1761. This contained many English tunes as well as six original works by Lyon, including; Two Celebrated Verses by Sternhold and Hopkins an Anthem taken from the 150th Psalm and the 104th Psalm by Dr. Watts. Though many early historians stated that Urania was a failure, it was the first music collection compiled by an American composer and rather progressive and influential.
