= Andrew Law (composer) =

American songwriter (1749-1821)

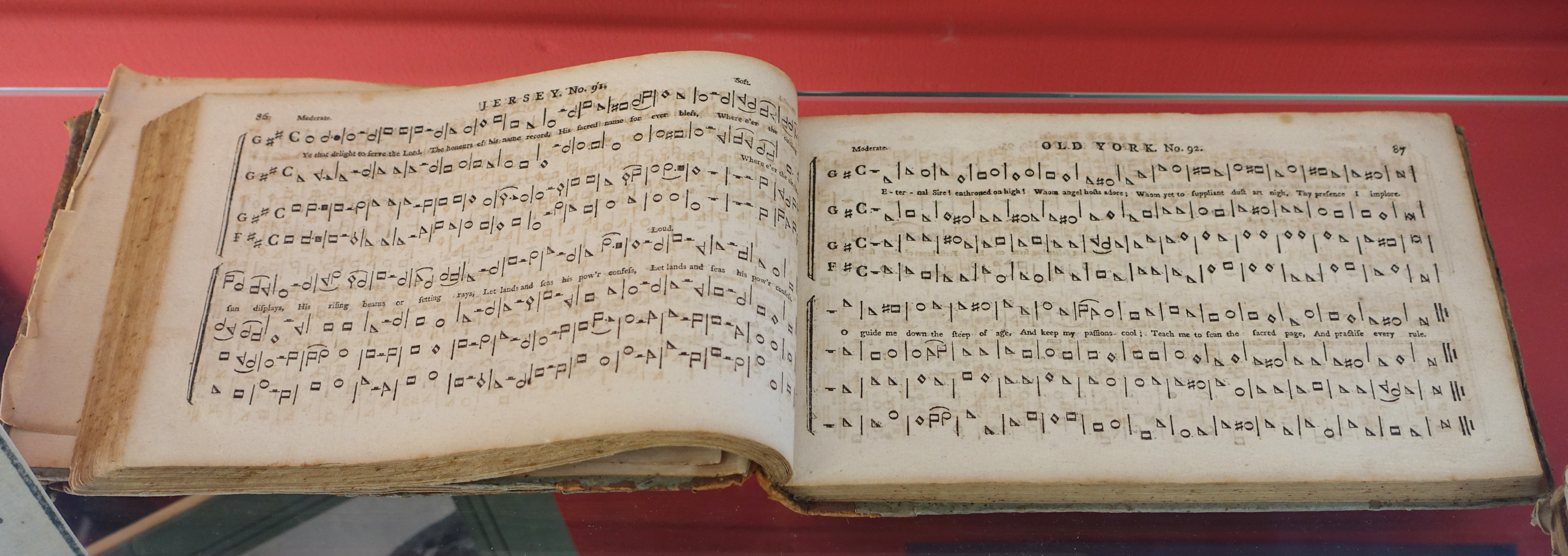
The Art of Singing in Three Parts, by Andrew Law, c. 1792

Andrew Law (1749–1821) was an American composer, preacher and singing teacher. He was born in Milford, Connecticut. Law wrote mostly simple hymn tunes and arranged tunes of other composers. In 1781, he was granted the first authorial copyright in the United States, though there is some debate about which work the grant applied to. His works include Select Harmony (1778), a Collection of Best Tunes and Anthems (1779), and The Art of Singing in Three Parts (1792–96). He was among the first American composers to put the melody in the soprano instead of the tenor part, and was also one of the first Americans to write about music. Andrew Law was a pioneer of the FASOLA (Shape note) system of musical notation which simplified lessons in reading music during the Singing School era of New England music. FASOLA singing is also known as "Shape Note Singing". He published Essays on Music in 1814. Andrew Law died in 1821.
