= Sacred Harp hymnwriters and composers =

The Sacred Harp is a shape note tunebook, originally compiled in 1844 by Benjamin Franklin White and Elisha J. King in Georgia and used to this day in revised form by Sacred Harp singers throughout America and overseas. This article is a historical overview and listing of the composers and poets who wrote the songs and texts of The Sacred Harp.

== Music ==
The music of The Sacred Harp is eclectic in origin, and can be roughly grouped into the following categories of songs (listed chronologically).

In the examples listed below, songs are identified by the page number in the two most prominent modern versions of The Sacred Harp; the so-called "Denson edition" and the "Cooper edition". Thus, "D,C 49" means "found on page 49 of both the Denson and Cooper editions".

- A few very old songs of European origin, such as "Old Hundred" (D,C 49), which in its original version dates to 1551. These oldest songs also include a few from a remote ancestor of Sacred Harp singing, the tradition of religious choral music that flourished in rural England in the mid 18th century, for example "Milford" by Joseph Stephenson (D 273).
- Songs by the New England composers of ca. 1770–1810, sometimes referred to as the "First New England School". These composers included William Billings, Daniel Read, Nehemiah Shumway, Stephen Jenks, and Supply Belcher. Of these, the best represented is Billings, with 14 songs in the Denson edition.
- Songs from the period 1811–1844, written as the center of participatory sacred music shifted geographically from New England to the rural South. A well-known song from this period is "Idumea", by Ananias Davisson; D,C 47.
- From roughly the same period, a group of folk tunes converted to multipart hymns, a practice at which William Walker excelled. The folk song scholar Bertrand Bronson identified the song "Wondrous Love" (D,C 159) as one such instance of folk song adaptation. It is not generally easy to locate the folk song ancestor of a Sacred Harp song, but the existence of the practice is fairly certain. One Sacred Harp composer, John Gordon McCurry, sometimes actually acknowledged the folk singers from whom he learned a song, as when he wrote "This Tune is arranged as sung by William Bowers, Eagle Grove, Georgia."
- Camp meeting songs. Buell Cobb notes that these can often be identified by their extensive refrains, reflecting their origin in hymns that were often memorized or learned on the spot without a hymnal. He gives as a possible example the song "Traveling Pilgrim" (H. S. Reese, 1850; D,C 278). Daniel Patterson draws a contrast between the camp meeting songs and the folksong-based hymns:
  [Whereas in] "folk hymnody" ... [the] worshipers used ballad and dance tunes when singing the hymn texts of 18th-century writers like Isaac Watts and the Wesleys, ... the campmeeting songs were folksy in text as well as tune. They are simple in diction and syntax. Their stanzas have many repeated lines and formulas and close with familiar choruses. They were designed to be caught by ear in gatherings where many people could not read or had no books.
- Songs by Southern composers from White and King's own singing community, centered in Georgia and Alabama. B. F. White himself is represented by 32 songs.
- New songs: The practice of composing new Sacred Harp tunes was never abandoned, and many of the songs in current editions date from the 20th and 21st centuries, written in the style (and often reusing lyrics from) of earlier work. 148 songs in the 1991 Denson edition were composed after 1900; the 2025 edition added 82 composed after 2000. Newer songs have been embraced by the community and some are among the most popular in use. Over the lifetime of the 1991 Edition, the four most often sung post-1900 songs are 475 "A Thankful Heart" (John T. Hocutt, 1989), 480 "Redemption" (also Hocutt, 1959), 503 "Lloyd" (1980, Raymond C. Hamrick), and 318 "Present Joys" (1908, A.M. Cagle)

The different historical eras used different modes of composition. While the New England composers wrote mostly in four parts (treble, alto, tenor, bass), their Southern successor in the 19th century typically wrote in just three (treble, tenor, and bass). Their work was altered around the turn of the 20th century, when alto parts were added, first in the new Cooper edition (1902) and later to what ultimately became the 'Denson' edition, many of the latter written by Seaborn Denson himself. The 2025 edition gives author credit for many alto parts not previously identified as having a separate author, many of them women (presumably, altos).

== Words ==
The words of Sacred Harp music tend to be older than the music. While some composers wrote both tune and lyrics for their songs, a very frequent practice was (and is) to rely for words on the work of earlier, mostly English, hymnodists. The composer would select hymn lyrics that metrically fit the tune. The lyrics of Isaac Watts were used for this purpose more than any other.

== Chronological list of hymn writers ==
The following is a selected list of the hymnwriters of The Sacred Harp, arranged chronologically by date of birth.

- Samuel Crossman (1623–1683)
- Isaac Watts (1674–1748)
- Philip Doddridge (1702–1751)
- Charles Wesley (1707–1788)
- Joseph Hart (1712–1768)
- Benjamin Beddome (1717–1795)
- Anne Steele (1717–1778)
- John Cennick (1718–1755)
- William Hammond (1719–1783)
- John Newton (1725–1807)
- Edward Perronet (1726–1792)
- Samuel Stennett (1727–1795)
- William Cowper (1731–1800)
- Augustus Montague Toplady (1740–1778)
- John Rippon (1751–1836)
- John Leland (1754–1841)
- John Adam Granade (1763–1807)

== Chronological list of composers ==
The following is a selected list of composers represented in The Sacred Harp, arranged chronologically by date of birth.

- William Billings (1746–1800)
- Justin Morgan (1747-1793)
- Supply Belcher (1751–1836)
- Abraham Wood (1752-1804)
- Jacob French (1754-1817)
- Daniel Read (1757–1836)
- Nehemiah Shumway (1761–1843)
- Samuel Holyoke (1762–1820)
- Jeremiah Ingalls (1764–1838)
- Oliver Holden (1765–1844)
- Stephen Jenks (1772–1856)
- Ananias Davisson (1780–1857)
- Lowell Mason (1792–1872)
- B. F. White (1800–1879)
- William Walker (1809–1875)
- Elisha J. King (1821–1844)
- John Palmer Rees (1828–1900)
- Henry Smith Rees (1828–1922)
- Seaborn McDaniel Denson (1854–1936)
- Thomas Jackson Denson (1863–1935)
- Alfred Marcus Cagle (1884–1968)
- Hugh McGraw (1931–2017)
- Neely Bruce (born 1944)
- Richard DeLong (1963–2020)

== Books and scholarly articles ==
- Bronson, Bertrand H. (1942) "Samuel Hall's Family Tree," California Folklore Quarterly, Vol. 1, No. 1. (Jan.), pp. 47–64. Available on JSTOR.
- Cobb, Buell E. (2001) The Sacred Harp: A Tradition and Its Music. University of Georgia Press. ISBN 0-8203-2371-3
- Jackson, George Pullen (1933) White Spirituals in the Southern Uplands. University of North Carolina Press. ISBN 0-486-21425-7
- Patterson, Daniel W. (1977) Liner notes to the recording The Social Harp: Early American Shape-Note Songs, sung by Hugh McGraw and fellow traditional singers. Reissued 1994, Rounder Records CD 0094.
- Steel, David Warren with Richard H. Hulan (2010) The Makers of the Sacred Harp. University of Illinois Press. ISBN 978-0-252-07760-9
