= New Sacred Harp =

The New Sacred Harp (or The New Sacred Harp: A Collection of Hymn-tunes, Anthems, and Popular Songs: for the Choir, Class, Convention and Home Circle) was a seven-shape note tune book released in 1884 through S.P. Richard & Son of Atlanta, Georgia.

It was compiled by brothers James Landrum White and Benjamin Franklin White, Jr., the sons of Benjamin Franklin White, the compiler and editor of The Sacred Harp song book.

The New Sacred Harp was 192 pages long, including rudiments, 206 songs, and an index. The songs of the book tended towards the more "modern" gospel style of Kieffer-Showalter-Vaughan publications (7-shapes, closer subdued harmony, etc.). Yet songs were included by composers of the Sacred Harp tradition, including D. P. White (J. L. White's elder brother), J. P. Rees, S. M. Denson, T. J. Denson and Absalom Ogletree.

About a dozen compositions were by J. L. White, though none were written by B. F., Jr. His contributions were apparently only editorial and financial. Fewer than 20% of its songs were found in the "old" Sacred Harp, and less than 5% of the songs were written in a minor key. These brothers probably hoped to profit from the name connection to their father's popular song book.
