= Chattahoochee Musical Convention =

Christian singing convention in the US

The Chattahoochee Musical Convention is a Sacred Harp singing convention. It is an annual gathering whose purposes are worship, through the singing of Sacred Harp music, and fostering of bonds of fellowship among singers. It bears the distinction of being the oldest surviving Sacred Harp musical convention, having been founded in 1852.

== History ==
Plans were laid for the convention in the fall of 1851 at the home of composer Oliver Bradfield, north of Newnan, Georgia. It was organized in 1852 in western Georgia at Macedonia Baptist Church in Coweta County. The impetus for the Chattahoochee Musical Convention was the success of the original Sacred Harp hymnbook and the Southern Musical Convention that was then affiliated with it. With the northward geographic spread of Sacred Harp singing into the Coweta County region, it was felt that the time had come for the residents of this area to have their own convention. The early sessions were attended by Sacred Harp founder B. F. White and other leading Sacred Harp figures of the day.

In its early period the convention was four days long, ending on the first Sunday in August and beginning the preceding Thursday. Currently it is a two-day convention, ending on the same day.

The convention missed a few sessions during the American Civil War. As Thurman (1952/2002, 34) states, "the progress of the Convention was greatly disrupted by the war. Many of the leading singers were called to arms and it was a serious blow to the body." At the end of the war in 1865 the Convention met again at Mount Zion in Carroll County, Georgia to begin anew; B. F. White and other Sacred Harp luminaries were in attendance. That year, the Chattahoochee Convention began keeping written records of its proceedings, records which have survived to the present time and serve as a historical resource for Sacred Harp scholarship. In 1866, the Convention adopted a written constitution.

The members of the Convention have included some of the creators of the modern editions of The Sacred Harp. According to Thurman, Joseph Stephen James, who headed the committee that created the 1911 edition from which the modern "Denson" edition descends, "had been a member of the Chattahoochee forty-four years when his revised edition was given to the public." The primary creators of the Denson edition (1936), Thomas Denson and Seaborn Denson, also attended the Convention on a number of occasions starting in 1878; and Thomas's son Paine Denson, who completed the work of the 1936 edition, was a member.

The Convention has met every year since resuming after the Civil War, with the sole exception of 1881.

== Venue ==
In the 1930s, Matthew H. & Ada Ward Wilson built a structure near Carrollton, Georgia, called Wilson Chapel, for the express purpose of housing the Chattahoochee Musical Convention. The Convention has met here for most of the years since 1938, and exclusively since 1989. The building continues to be maintained by the Wilson family.

== Etymology ==
"Chattahoochee" is a local place name, notably of the Chattahoochee River, one of the principal streams of Georgia that flows through the region of the convention. It is said to come from an expression in Creek meaning "painted rock."
