= Awake, My Soul: The Story of the Sacred Harp =

- Directed by: Matt Hinton; Erica Hinton
- Written by: Matt Hinton; Erica Hinton; John Plunkett
- Produced by: Matt Hinton
- Narrated by: Jim Lauderdale
- Cinematography: Matt Hinton; Erica Hinton
- Edited by: Matt Hinton w/ Jennifer Brooks
- Music by: William Billings; William Walker; B. F. White; E. J. King
- Distributed by: Awake Productions
- Release date: 24 September 2006 (Birmingham Sidewalk Film Festival)
- Running time: 75 minutes
- Country: United States
- Language: English

Awake, My Soul: The Story of the Sacred Harp is a 2006 documentary film directed by Matt and Erica Hinton, and narrated by Jim Lauderdale. It follows the folk tradition of Sacred Harp singing, a type of shape-note singing, kept alive by amateur singers in the rural American South.

== Cast ==
The Sacred Harp singers:

- Richard DeLong
- Raymond Hamrick
- Richard A. Ivey
- Rodney Ivey
- Warren Steel
- Judy Caudle
- Joyce Smith Walton
- Hugh McGraw
- Carlene Griffin
- Charlene Wallace
- Jim Carnes
- Elene Stovall
- Terry Wootten
- Jeff and Shelbie Sheppard
- Lonnie Rogers
- Ted Mercer
- William Reynolds

== See also ==
- List of American films of 2006
- Performance practice of Sacred Harp music
