= Centralhatchee, Georgia =

- Town
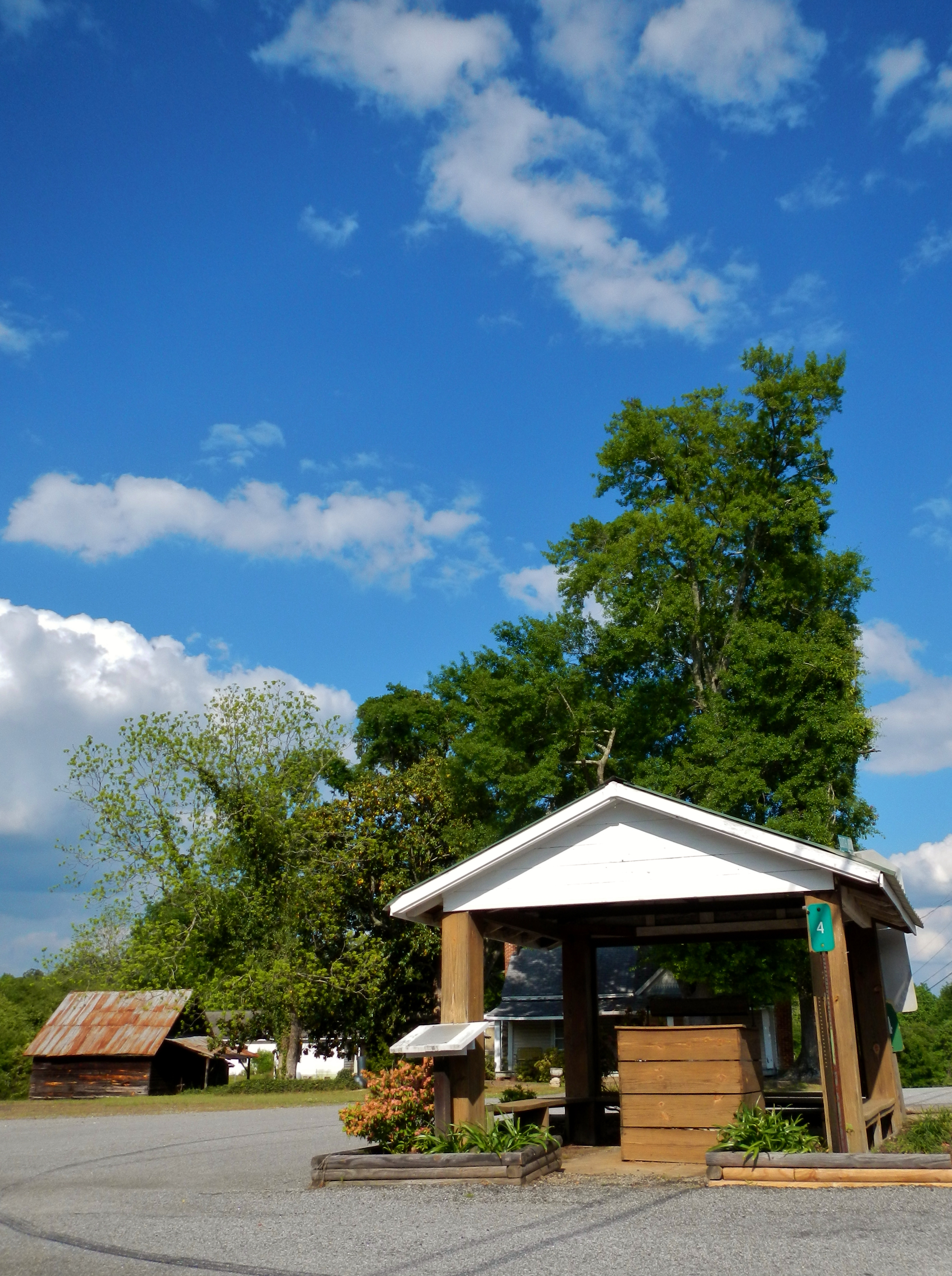
- Centralhatchee in 2012

- Location in Heard County and the state of Georgia
- Coordinates: 33°22′7″N 85°6′15″W
- Country: United States
- State: Georgia
- County: Heard

Government
  - Mayor: Barbie Crockett

Area
  - Total: 3.28 sq mi (8.49 km^{2})
  - Land: 3.28 sq mi (8.49 km^{2})
  - Water: 0 sq mi (0.00 km^{2})
- Elevation: 846 ft (258 m)

Population (2020)
  - Total: 348
  - Density: 106.2/sq mi (41.01/km^{2})
- Time zone: UTC-5 (Eastern (EST))
  - Summer (DST): UTC-4 (EDT)
- ZIP Code: 30217
- Area code: 706
- FIPS code: 13-15026
- GNIS feature ID: 0355098
- Website: https://www.townofcentralhatchee.com/

Centralhatchee is a small village in Heard County, Georgia, United States. The population was 348 in 2020.

== History ==
The town of Centralhatchee was originally a militia district known as "Black Ankle". The community of Glenloch, to the north, was known as "Blue Shin". The geographic configuration of these two communities, according to Native American legend, resembled the ankle and shin portion of the leg and foot. The town became part of Heard County when the county was formed from parts of Carroll, Troup and Coweta counties in 1830.

The town was chartered in 1903 with the name "Centralhatchee". The community takes its name from nearby Centralhatchee Creek.

== Geography ==
Centralhatchee is located in northern Heard County at 33°22′7″N 85°6′15″W (33.368476, -85.104182). Centralhatchee Creek, a south-flowing tributary of the Chattahoochee River, passes just outside of the town limits to the west.

U.S. Route 27, a four-lane highway, passes through the west side of town, leading south 7 miles (11 km) to Franklin, the Heard County seat, and north 16 miles (26 km) to Carrollton.

According to the United States Census Bureau, the town has a total area of 3.3 square miles (8.5 km^{2}), all land.

== Demographics ==
Historical population
Census	Pop.	Note	%±
1910	119		—
1920	151		26.9%
1930	176		16.6%
1940	201		14.2%
1950	239		18.9%
1960	174		−27.2%
1970	186		6.9%
1980	240		29.0%
1990	301		25.4%
2000	383		27.2%
2010	408		6.5%
2020	348		−14.7%
U.S. Decennial Census

As of the census of 2000, there were 383 people, 136 households, and 105 families residing in the town. In 2020, its population was 348.

== Notable person ==
- Roy Lee Johnson, R&B and soul songwriter, singer and guitarist
- Hugh McGraw, Sacred Harp songleader and composer

== See also ==
- List of towns in Georgia (U.S. state)
