= Arbacoochee, Alabama =

Unincorporated community in Alabama, United States

- Unincorporated community
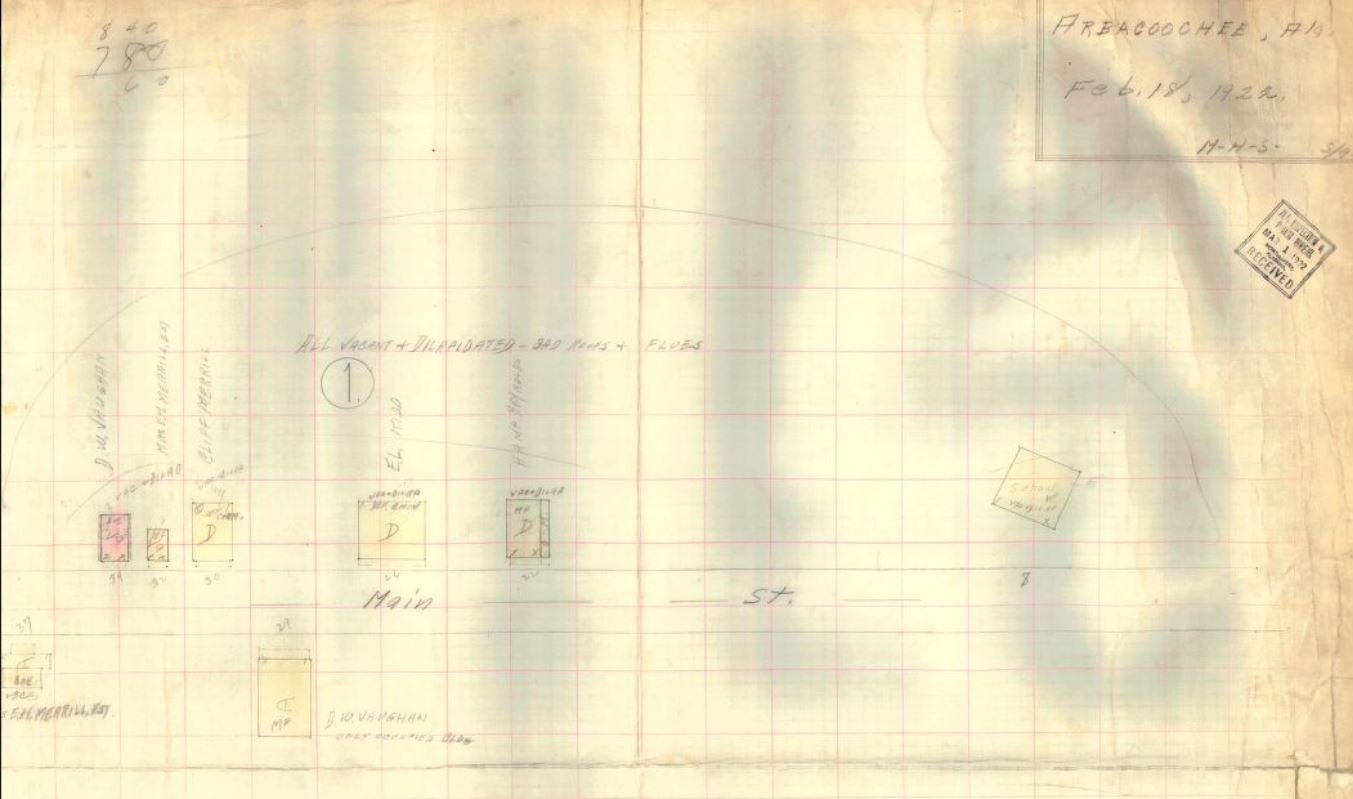
- 1922 fire insurance map of Arbacoochee

- Location within Alabama Location within the United States
- Coordinates: 33°34′34″N 85°31′02″W
- Country: United States
- State: Alabama
- County: Cleburne
- Elevation: 961 ft (293 m)
- Time zone: UTC-6 (Central (CST))
  - Summer (DST): UTC-5 (CDT)
- GNIS feature ID: 159079

Arbacoochee is an unincorporated community in Cleburne County, Alabama, United States.

== History ==
Arbacoochee was named after the old Creek Indian village of "Abihkuchi", which translates to "a pile at the base." Gold was discovered here in 1832, and the local mines produced over $5,000,000 worth of gold. In 1845, Arbacoochee had a population of over 5,000 people and was home to twenty general stores, five saloons, a school, two churches, two hotels, two mining supply stores, a fire department, race track, and over 100 homes. Most of the residents departed when news of the California Gold Rush reached Alabama, and only a few families remained.

A post office was operated in Arbacoochee from 1842 to 1904.

== Demographics ==
=== Arbacoochee ===
Historical population
Census	Pop.	Note	%±
1880	50		—
U.S. Decennial Census

Arbacoochee first appeared on the 1880 U.S. Census as an unincorporated village and as the 10th beat/precinct of Cleburne County (see below). The population of the village made it the second largest community in the county behind the then-county seat of Edwardsville. The village did not report again on the census, although the precinct bearing its name continued to report until 1950.

=== Historic Demographics ===
Census Year	Population	State Place Rank	County Place Rank
1880 (Note: 1st year Arbacoochee reported on census)	50 (-) (Note: (-)Indicates no immediate prior population figure or rank) (Note: Racial demographics not reported for places of less than 2,500 on 1880 census.)	211th (-)	2nd (-)

== Arbacoochee Precinct (1880-1950) ==
Historical population
Census	Pop.	Note	%±
1880	877		—
1890	1,046		19.3%
1900	896		−14.3%
1910	899		0.3%
1920	833		−7.3%
1930	1,084		30.1%
1940	826		−23.8%
1950	607		−26.5%
U.S. Decennial Census

The Arbacoochee Beat (Precinct) (Cleburne County 10th Beat) first appeared on the 1880 U.S. Census. It was changed from "beat" to "precinct" in 1890. The precinct continued to report until 1950. In 1960, the precinct was merged as part of a larger reorganization of counties into the census division of Heflin.

== Notable people ==
- Seaborn McDaniel Denson and Thomas Jackson Denson, musicians and singing school teachers within the Sacred Harp tradition
