= East Texas Musical Convention =

The East Texas Musical Convention, now usually called the East Texas Sacred Harp Convention, is an annual gathering of shape note singers. Songs are sung a cappella from the Sacred Harp tunebook. The Convention was organized in 1855, and is the oldest Sacred Harp convention in Texas, and the second oldest in the United States. The East Texas Convention was modeled after the older (now defunct) Southern Musical Convention established in 1845 by Benjamin Franklin White, the compiler of The Sacred Harp.

The East Texas Convention has a continuous history from 1868, the earliest year notated in its minutes. William Russell Adams, President of the Convention in 1874, 1884, and 1885, wrote to Aldine S. Kieffer, explaining that the convention missed a few years of meeting because of the American Civil War. Re-established after the war, a large influx of Georgia and Alabama settlers added to its strength. In its early years it was generally considered a forum of Christian worship. Today many are attracted to its folk music aspect.

Throughout its history, the East Texas Musical Convention has convened annually in six East Texas counties: Gregg, Harrison, Panola, Rusk, Smith and Upshur. The Convention presently meets for two days in Henderson, Texas on the weekend of the second Sunday in August. The current "textbook" of the Convention is The Sacred Harp (2012 Revised Cooper Edition), first revised by W. M. Cooper and others in 1902.

== Early officers ==
- John T. Holloway
- James Pendleton Holloway
- Mathew Mark Wynn
- Thomas Jefferson Allison
- Charles Absalem Mangham
- John Franklin McLendon
