= David Patillo White =

American singing teacher (1828–1093)

David Patillo White (1828–1903) was a shape note singing teacher, composer, and a co-issuer, with his father, of the 1870 Sacred Harp. He was the second child of Benjamin Franklin White and Thurza Melvina Golightly, whose other children were William Decatur, Robert H., Mary Caroline, Nancy Ogburn, Thurza Melvina, Benjamin Franklin, Jr., James Landrum, and Martha America.

David Patillo White was born in October, 1828, in South Carolina, and moved with his family to Harris County, Georgia in 1842. In 1844, B. F. White and Elisha J. King published The Sacred Harp, using the four-shape shape note system of notation.

David Patillo White married Celeste V. Brown, the daughter of Reuben E. and Elizabeth Brown, in Barbour County, Alabama on December 16, 1852. They had ten children, including John T., Omer, Alice, Ella, James, Lena, Lula, Thomas L. and Minnie). The family lived in Henry County, Alabama (1860 Census), before moving to Polk County, Texas (1870 Census), and later to Cherokee County, Texas (1880 Census).

David Patillo White was a music teacher, teaching singing schools in The Sacred Harp. He is so listed in the 1850 Harris County, Georgia census, but afterwards lists his primary occupation as farmer. He composed five songs that appeared in the 1850 edition of the Sacred Harp, including Columbiana and Norwich. Song to the Lamb was added in 1869. The fourth edition of The Sacred Harp was prepared in 1869 by B. F. White and a committee selected by the Southern Musical Convention. It bears an 1869 introduction and an 1870 copyright by B. F. White and D. P. White, clarifying ownership by the White family rather than the Convention.

D. P.'s primary occupation was that of a farmer, but he was active in both music and public service in Texas, serving as President of the Central Texas Musical Convention, music teacher, notary public, and justice of the peace. D. P. White died October 23, 1903, and is buried in an unknown location, probably in Cherokee County. His wife Celeste died in 1904. David and Celeste White were members of Mt. Selman Baptist Church (org. 1890) in Cherokee County at their times of death.

== Sources ==
- A Brief History of the Sacred Harp and Its Author, B. F. White, Sr., and Contributors, by Joe S. James, privately printed, 1904.
- A Chronological History of the Life of Benjamin Franklin White (unpublished), by Donald Stephen Clarke
- The Sacred Harp: A Tradition and Its Music, by Buell E. Cobb, Jr., University of Georgia Press, 1978, 1989.
- United States Federal Censuses
- White Spirituals in the Southern Uplands, by George Pullen Jackson, University of North Carolina Press, 1933.
