= Psalm 11 =

Biblical psalm

- "In the LORD put I my trust"
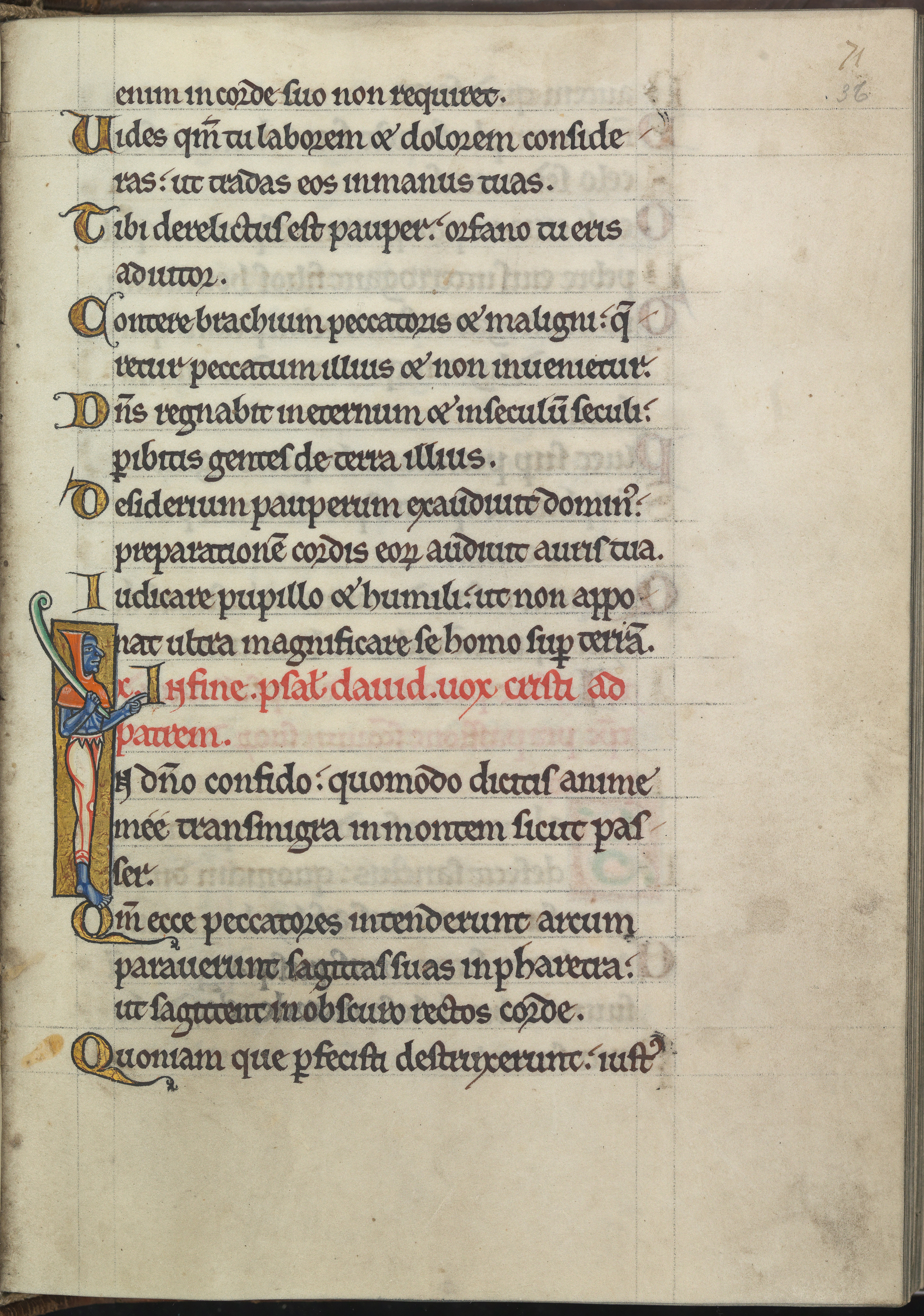
- Psalm 11 (10) in the Psalter of Eleanor of Aquitaine
- Other name: Psalm 10; "In Domino confido"
- Language: Hebrew (original)

Psalm 11
- ← Psalm 10 Psalm 12 →
- Book: Book of Psalms
- Hebrew Bible part: Ketuvim
- Order in the Hebrew part: 1
- Category: Sifrei Emet
- Christian Bible part: Old Testament
- Order in the Christian part: 19

Psalm 11 is the eleventh psalm of the Book of Psalms, beginning in English in the King James Version: "In the LORD put I my trust: how say ye to my soul, Flee as a bird to your mountain?" In the slightly different numbering of the Greek Septuagint and the Latin Vulgate, it is Psalm 10, "In Domino confido". Its authorship is traditionally assigned to King David, but most scholars place its origin some time after the end of the Babylonian captivity.

The psalm forms a regular part of Jewish, Catholic, Lutheran, Anglican and other Protestant liturgies. It was set to music by composers including Heinrich Schütz, Joseph Stephenson and Benjamin Cooke.

== Structure ==
The shape of this psalm differs from the usual scheme, for which the Old Testament scholar Hermann Gunkel finally assigns as a "confidence Psalm in the form of conversation". Erhard S. Gerstenberger calls the psalm a "disputierendes prayer" within the genus of Lamentations of an individual. Hans-Joachim Kraus has the psalm as a song of prayer.

Usually, the Psalm is organized as follows:

1. Verse 1a: trust in YHWH
2. Verse 1b-3: Rejecting the advice of well-meaning friends
3. Verse 4-7: YHWH as fair judge and legal helpers of the persecuted

A division into verses is sometimes not done.

== Text ==
The following table shows the Hebrew text of the Psalm with vowels, alongside the Koine Greek text in the Septuagint and the English translation from the King James Version. Note that the meaning can slightly differ between these versions, as the Septuagint and the Masoretic Text come from different textual traditions. (Note: A 1917 translation directly from Hebrew to English by the Jewish Publication Society can be found here or here, and an 1844 translation directly from the Septuagint by L. C. L. Brenton can be found here. Both translations are in the public domain.) In the Septuagint, this psalm is numbered Psalm 10.

#	Hebrew	English	Greek
1	לַמְנַצֵּ֗חַ לְדָ֫וִ֥ד בַּֽיהֹוָ֨ה ׀ חָסִ֗יתִי אֵ֭יךְ תֹּאמְר֣וּ לְנַפְשִׁ֑י (נודו) [נ֝֗וּדִי] הַרְכֶ֥ם צִפּֽוֹר׃	(To the chief Musician, A Psalm of David.) In the LORD put I my trust: how say ye to my soul, Flee as a bird to your mountain?	Εἰς τὸ τέλος· ψαλμὸς τῷ Δαυΐδ. - ΕΠΙ τῷ Κυρίῳ πέποιθα· πῶς ἐρεῖτε τῇ ψυχῇ μου· μεταναστεύου ἐπὶ τὰ ὄρη ὡς στρουθίον;
2	כִּ֤י הִנֵּ֪ה הָרְשָׁעִ֡ים יִדְרְכ֬וּן קֶ֗שֶׁת כּוֹנְנ֣וּ חִצָּ֣ם עַל־יֶ֑תֶר לִיר֥וֹת בְּמוֹ־אֹ֝֗פֶל לְיִשְׁרֵי־לֵֽב׃	For, lo, the wicked bend their bow, they make ready their arrow upon the string, that they may privily shoot at the upright in heart.	ὅτι ἰδοὺ οἱ ἁμαρτωλοὶ ἐνέτειναν τόξον, ἡτοίμασαν βέλη εἰς φαρέτραν τοῦ κατατοξεῦσαι ἐν σκοτομήνῃ τοὺς εὐθεῖς τῇ καρδίᾳ.
3	כִּ֣י הַ֭שָּׁתוֹת יֵהָרֵס֑וּן צַ֝דִּ֗יק מַה־פָּעָֽל׃	If the foundations be destroyed, what can the righteous do?	ὅτι ἃ σὺ κατηρτίσω, αὐτοὶ καθεῖλον· ὁ δὲ δίκαιος τί ἐποίησε;
4	יְהֹוָ֤ה ׀ בְּֽהֵ֘יכַ֤ל קׇדְשׁ֗וֹ יְהֹוָה֮ בַּשָּׁמַ֢יִם כִּ֫סְא֥וֹ עֵינָ֥יו יֶחֱז֑וּ עַפְעַפָּ֥יו יִ֝בְחֲנ֗וּ בְּנֵ֣י אָדָֽם׃	The LORD is in his holy temple, the LORD's throne is in heaven: his eyes behold, his eyelids try, the children of men.	Κύριος ἐν ναῷ ἁγίῳ αὐτοῦ· Κύριος ἐν οὐρανῷ ὁ θρόνος αὐτοῦ. οἱ ὀφθαλμοὶ αὐτοῦ εἰς τὸν πένητα ἀποβλέπουσι, τὰ βλέφαρα αὐτοῦ ἐξετάζει τοὺς υἱοὺς τῶν ἀνθρώπων.
5	יְהֹוָה֮ צַדִּ֢יק יִ֫בְחָ֥ן וְ֭רָשָׁע וְאֹהֵ֣ב חָמָ֑ס שָֽׂנְאָ֥ה נַפְשֽׁוֹ׃	The LORD trieth the righteous: but the wicked and him that loveth violence his soul hateth.	Κύριος ἐξετάζει τὸν δίκαιον καὶ τὸν ἀσεβῆ, ὁ δὲ ἀγαπῶν τὴν ἀδικίαν μισεῖ τὴν ἑαυτοῦ ψυχήν.
6	יַמְטֵ֥ר עַל־רְשָׁעִ֗ים פַּ֫חִ֥ים אֵ֣שׁ וְ֭גׇפְרִית וְר֥וּחַ זִלְעָפ֗וֹת מְנָ֣ת כּוֹסָֽם׃	Upon the wicked he shall rain snares, fire and brimstone, and an horrible tempest: this shall be the portion of their cup.	ἐπιβρέξει ἐπὶ ἁμαρτωλοὺς παγίδας, πῦρ καὶ θεῖον καὶ πνεῦμα καταιγίδος ἡ μερὶς τοῦ ποτηρίου αὐτῶν.
7	כִּֽי־צַדִּ֣יק יְ֭הֹוָה צְדָק֣וֹת אָהֵ֑ב יָ֝שָׁ֗ר יֶחֱז֥וּ פָנֵֽימוֹ׃	For the righteous LORD loveth righteousness; his countenance doth behold the upright.	ὅτι δίκαιος Κύριος, καὶ δικαιοσύνας ἠγάπησεν, εὐθύτητας εἶδε τὸ πρόσωπον αὐτοῦ.

== Interpretation ==
The psalm is strongly individual. Klaus Seybold calls this the personal testimony of persecution, who have opted for the legal process. Hermann Gunkel agrees calling it the "subjective response of a single poet to an involuntary emergency". Oswald Loretz sees the psalm as "a product of post-exil scriptural scholarship that seeks to modernise traditional text" "ein Produkt nachexilischer Schriftgelehrsamkeit, die die Texte der Tradition modernisieren will").

The psalm leads off with a question which is put to the writer's soul: 'Why should I flee like a bird to the mountains?' Barnes and many others see the fleeing as negative and running away rather than trusting God. The Psalmist instead resolves to trust God. There is an irony in that David often did flee from Saul to the mountains, but in the long run became King in Jerusalem in 1 Sam chapters 21 through 23. Additionally there is a contrast with Psalm 7: the wicked shoot arrows at the righteous in Psalm 11, but in Psalm 7 God readied his bow and arrows for the wicked. There is also a tension: God is felt to be far away and unresponsive - but He is not and that tension also appears in other Psalms, such as in Psalm 22.

== Uses ==
=== Catholicism ===
According to the Rule of St. Benedict (530AD), Psalm 1 to Psalm 20 were mainly reserved for Office of Prime. This psalm was traditionally performed at the Office of Prime on Wednesday.

In the current liturgy, Psalm 11 is, most solemnly recited or sung during vespers on Monday of the first week.

=== Book of Common Prayer ===
In the Church of England's Book of Common Prayer, this psalm is appointed to be read on the morning of the second day of the month.

=== Music ===
Heinrich Schütz set a metred hymn paraphrasing Psalm 11 in German, "Ich trau auf Gott, was soll's denn sein", SWV 107, included in the Becker Psalter. Joseph Stephenson included a paraphrase in English, "Since I have plac'd my trust in God", in his 1757 collection Church Harmony, Sacred to Devotion. Benjamin Cooke wrote a setting of a metred paraphrase in English of verses 1–3, "On God My Steadfast Hopes Rely", published in 1794.
