= Singing school =

School in which students are taught to sightread vocal music

O, tell me young friends, while the morning's fair and cool,
O where, tell me where, shall I find your singing school.
You'll find it under the tall oak where the leaves do shake and blow,
You'll find a half hundred a-singing faw, sol, [law].

— from The Social Harp (1855)

A singing school is a school in which students are taught to sightread vocal music. Singing schools are a long-standing cultural institution in the Southern United States. While some singing schools are offered for credit, most are informal programs.

Historically, singing schools have been strongly affiliated with Protestant Christianity. Some are held under the auspices of particular Protestant denominations that maintain a tradition of a cappella singing, such as the Church of Christ and the Primitive Baptists. Others are associated with Sacred Harp, Southern Gospel, and similar singing traditions, whose music is religious in character but sung outside the context of church services.

Often the music taught in singing schools uses shape note or "buckwheat" notation, in which the notes are assigned particular shapes to indicate their pitch. There are two main varieties: the four-note, or fasola, system used in Sacred Harp music, and the seven-note system developed by Jesse B. Aikin used in southern gospel music. Some churches, including some Baptist churches (though fewer and fewer), use hymnals printed in shape notes.

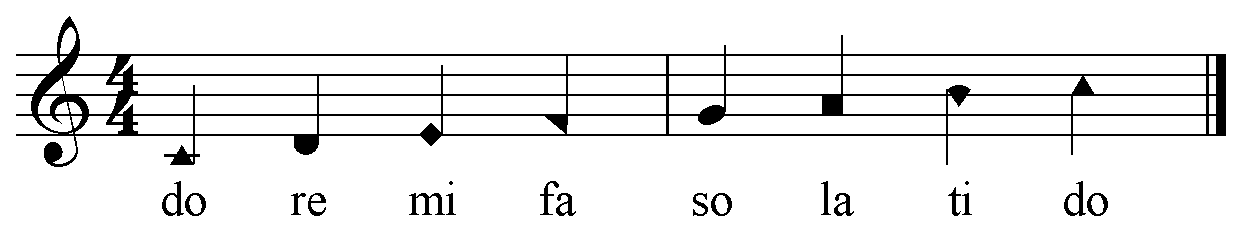
C Major Scale in 7 Shape System

== History ==
=== Origins ===
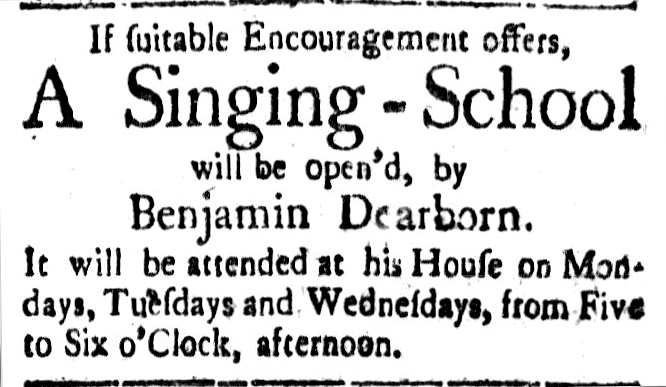
Benjamin Dearborn's singing school announcement in the New Hampshire Gazette, April 5, 1783

The first American singing schools began in New England in the early 1700s as an effort to spread the use of written music in congregational singing. In some denominations, controversies existed on whether congregations should sing audibly, and whether singing should be limited to the Psalms of David. This New England controversy centered around "regular singing" versus the "usual way". The "usual way" consisted of the entire congregation singing in unison tunes passed on by oral tradition, often by lining out. "Regular singing" consisted of singing by note or rule. Though intended for the entire congregation, "regular singing" sometimes divided the congregation into singers and non-singers. Massachusetts ministers John Tufts and Thomas Walter were among the leaders in this "reform movement". Tufts' An Introduction to the Singing of Psalm Tunes is generally considered the first singing school manual. By the middle of the 18th century, the arguments for "regular singing" had generally won the day.

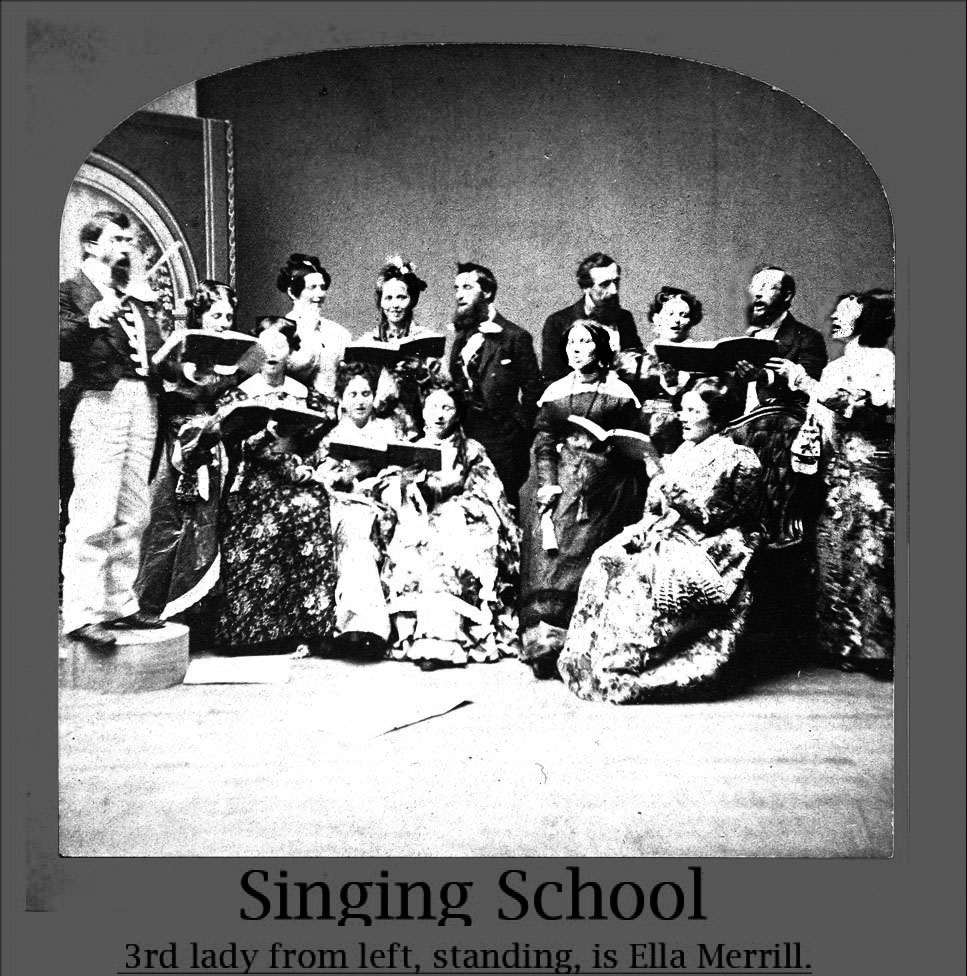
Singing school of Keene, New Hampshire, circa 1880s

By the end of the 18th century, the singing school manuals had become standardized in an oblong-shaped tunebook, usually containing tunes with only one stanza of text. William Billings was one of the most important of the New England singing school teachers of this period. One of his singing schools was held in 1774 in Stoughton, Massachusetts. According to Hall, "The school taught by William Billings is the first and only one with all the pupils given." A few members of this singing school later helped organize the Stoughton Musical Society in 1786, now the oldest surviving choral society in the United States.

New systems of music notation, including shape notes, were developed by singing school teachers as an aid in learning to sing by sight. Early shape note systems were an extension of "Old English" or "Lancashire" sol-fa, developed in Britain in the 17th century, with the intention of teaching school children to sing, and remained in use there until the 20th. This system was used in America from the late 17th century. The use of "shape-notes" themselves was an American innovation, first put into use in 1798 in Philadelphia and soon popular in the many hymn collections published in the early 19th century. The four-shape "fasola" system was prominent before the Civil War and survives largely in the Sacred Harp tradition, while various seven-shape systems gained popularity beginning in the 1860s and are still seen in some denominational hymnals and in Southern Gospel music.

By the 1820s, the "Yankee singing school" had become a nationwide phenomenon. However, advocates of European classical music like Lowell Mason sought to suppress the tradition in favor of a more cosmopolitan idiom, which came to be taught at public schools. Eventually, singing schools in the north faded to obscurity, while in the south and west they became a prominent social event for small-town Americans looking for something to do.

=== Continued use in the South ===
Singing schools were often taught by traveling singing masters who would stay in a location for a few weeks and teach a singing school. A singing school would be a large social event for a town; sometimes nearly everyone in the town would attend and people would come from many miles away. Many young men and women saw singing schools as important to their courtship traditions. Sometimes the entire life of a town would be put on hold as everyone came out to singing school. In this way, singing schools resembled tent revivals.

Laura Ingalls Wilder related attending a singing school as a young lady in These Happy Golden Years, one of the Little House books. Her husband, Almanzo Wilder, courted her there.

One common tradition was the "singing school picture" taken of the teacher and students on the last day of school. Many old black and white photographs exist as records of these events from the nineteenth and early twentieth centuries; genealogical researchers often find these records useful. The pictures were often taken in front of a blackboard with the name of the teacher and date of the school. Some of these pictures show small classes, while others record very large schools.

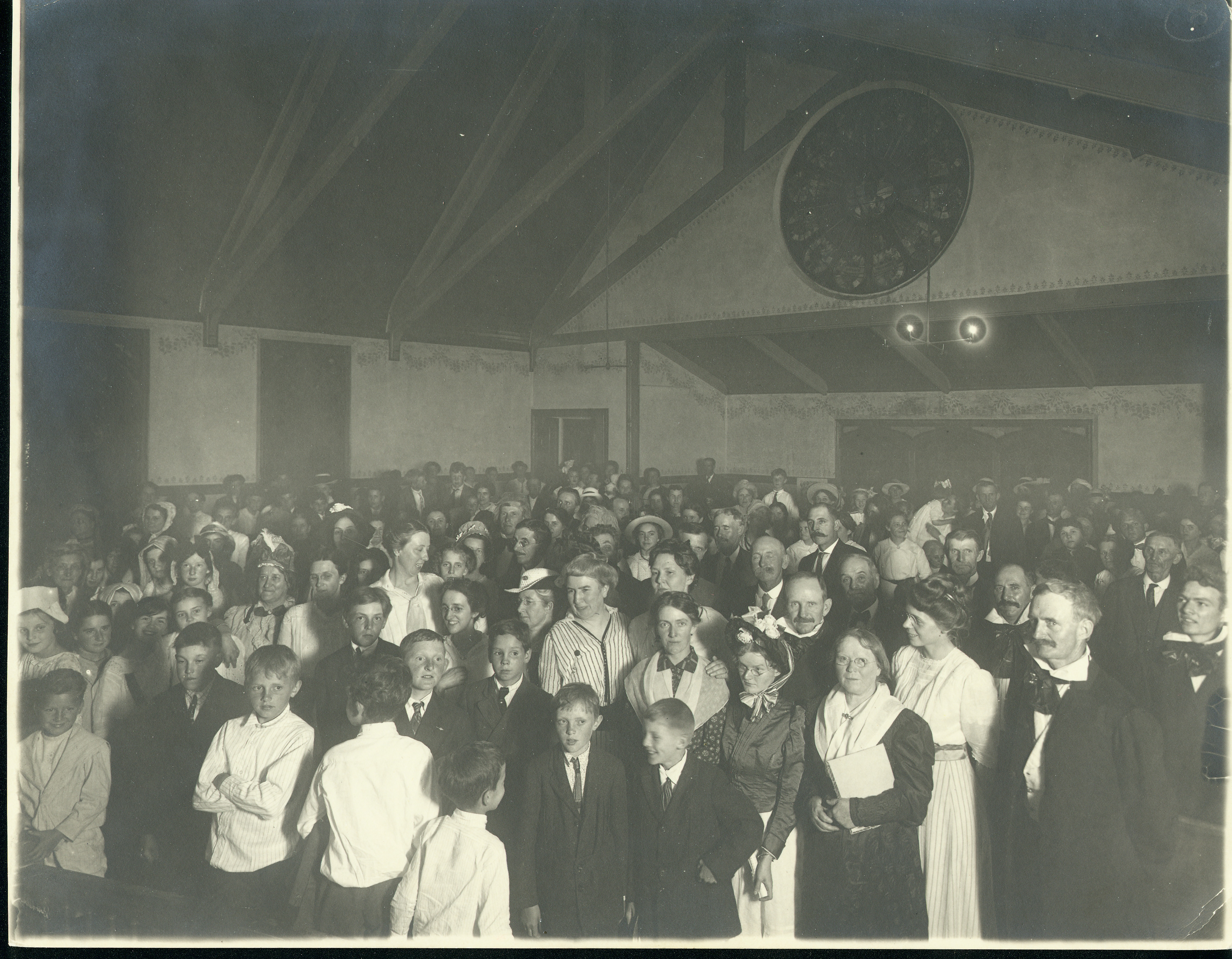
Singing school conducted at Jacksonville as part of six-day Extension school in August, 1915.

Singing schools underwent many changes as cities grew and the population moved away from an agrarian lifestyle. One of the most notable changes was the length of schools; at one time it was common for schools to last four weeks. This was shortened over time, and today most of the larger singing schools last for two weeks, though the Gospel Singers of America School of Gospel Music still lasts for three weeks.

Singing schools began to hold less interest for the general public as time went on and could rarely get attendance from an entire town. Instead, schools were attended by interested students from a much larger region. In the case of Sacred Harp singing schools, students usually attended because of their interest in the Sacred Harp singing tradition; in other schools, students attended because of an interest in vocal church music, especially for those churches that maintain an all-a capella music tradition.

The tradition of having singing school masters who traveled between various towns where they held singing schools faded away in favor of holding annual schools in the same location. Primitive Baptists have established three permanently located singing schools in the state of Texas (Harmony Hill at Azle, Harmony Plains at Cone, and Melody Grove at Warren). There are several non-denominational seven-shape singing schools throughout the southern United States, including the North Georgia School of Gospel Music in Georgia, Ben Speer's Stamps-Baxter School of Music in Tennessee, Cumberland Valley School of Gospel Music in Tennessee and the Alabama School of Gospel Music in Alabama. Camp Fasola, which was founded in 2003, is an attempt by Sacred Harp enthusiasts to establish a permanent annual singing school.

Singing schools are also common in Missionary Baptist churches, as well as rural churches across the South, including Methodist, Church of God, Southern Baptist, and other denominations. Many of these churches still prefer to use shape note hymnals, as opposed to round note versions that many denominational publishing houses provide. In southern gospel singing schools, convention songbooks are used to teach sight-singing, music theory, and conducting. Some music publishing companies have also published music theory books for use in the schools.

== Curriculum ==
The basic subjects taught at singing schools are music theory and sight reading (the ability to sing a piece of music on first reading). Most southern gospel schools also focus extensively on song leading, the ability to direct a group in vocal music. Song leading requires both music theory skills and public speaking skills. In addition, many schools teach composition and ear training. Most song leading classes are open to both genders, but some schools are associated with Christian religious traditions that allow only male leadership and therefore only offer such classes to males.

Sacred Harp singing schools use one or more of the 20th century editions of The Sacred Harp as curriculum. Some of these schools are one-day workshops held in conjunction with a singing convention. The emphasis is on teaching newcomers and advanced musicians the note system and traditions of Sacred Harp.

Many singing schools have published their own small textbooks on music theory, harmony, and song and lyric composition. These are often offered to students as part of the tuition charge of the school.Some schools, such as Cumberland Valley School of Gospel Music, include in the tuition charge a convention songbook rather than a textbook. At some schools students purchase a pitch pipe or tuning fork. Primitive Baptists commonly practice pitching by ear rather than with a pitch pipe. Southern gospel schools primarily use the piano as accompaniment. Pitch pipes are sometimes used in individual classes for brief practice.

It is common for students to continue to return to their singing school year after year, even after completing the entire curriculum the school offers, for additional practice as well as for the social opportunity the school represents. Many singing school students eventually become teachers. Though singing schools are not as prominent today as they were, for many people they are still an important yearly event.

== List of singing masters ==
Ordered chronologically by date of birth.

- William Billings (1746–1800)
- Justin Morgan (1747–1798)
- Benjamin Dearborn (1754–1838)
- Jacob French (1754–1817)
- Joseph Funk (1778–1862)
- Benjamin Franklin White (1800–1879)
- Jesse B. Aikin (1808–1900)
- William Walker (1809–1875)
- Aldine Silliman Kieffer (1840–1904)
- Wilson Marion Cooper (1850–1916)
- Seaborn Denson (1854–1936)
- Charles H. Gabriel (1856–1932)
- Anthony Johnson Showalter (1858–1924)
- Franklin Lycurgus Eiland (1860–1909)
- Thomas Denson (1863–1935)
- James David Vaughan (1864–1941)
- Judge Jackson (1883–1958)
- Tillit Sidney Teddlie (1885–1987)
- William Burton Walbert (1886–1959)
- Virgil Oliver Stamps (1892–1940)
- C.C. Stafford (1893-1977)
- Robert Sterling Arnold (1905–2003)
- Dorsey Yarborough (1913-2002)
- Joe Roper (1915–1990)
- Videt Richard Polk (1918–2002)
- Dewey Caldwell (1926-1997)
- Byron E. Reid (born 1929)
- Hugh McGraw (1931–2017)
- Bobby Jean Burnett Sr. (1932–2008)
- Pauline Thompson (born 1944)
- Joel D. McKissack (born 1955)
- Richard DeLong (born 1963)
- Eugene McCammon (currently active)
- Tim Eriksen (born 1966)

Date needed:

- Autrey Hayes
- Key Dillard
- Gene Jeffress
- Jimmy L. Jeffress
- James E. Reid

== List of singing schools ==
- Alabama School of Gospel Music, Snead State Junior College, Boaz, Alabama
- Ben Speer's Stamps-Baxter School of Gospel Music, Murfreesboro, Tennessee
- Brockwell Gospel Music School, Brockwell, Arkansas
- Camp Fasola (Sacred Harp-affiliated), Anniston, Alabama and Double Springs, Alabama
- Cumberland Valley School of Gospel Music, Pulaski, Tennessee
- Do Re Mi Gospel Music Academy, Lebanon, Tennessee
- Four States Praise Camp, Lewisville, Arkansas
- Gospel Singers of America, Pass Christian, Mississippi
- Haralson County Singing School, Bremen, Georgia
- Haskell Singing School, Church of Christ, Haskell, Texas
- Foundation School of Church Music, Church of Christ, Buda, Texas
- Jeffress School of Gospel Music, Crossett, Arkansas
- Harmony Highlands Singing School, Jasper, Alabama
- Harmony Hill Singing School, Azle, Texas
- Harmony Plains Singing School, Cone, Texas
- Leoma School of Gospel Music, Lawrenceburg, Tennessee
- Mountain State School of Gospel Music, Dunbar, West Virginia
- National School of Gospel Music, Tennessee, Kansas, and California
- North Georgia School of Gospel Music, Dahlonega, Georgia
- R. J. Stevens Music Singing School, Wilburton, Oklahoma
- Southern Gospel Music School of America, Chattanooga, Tennessee
- Texas Normal Singing School (ACU Singing School), Abilene, Texas
- Texas Southern Gospel School of Music, Navarro College, Corsicana, Texas
- Tri-County Singers Association School, Charleston, West Virginia
- West Virginia School of Gospel Music, Kenna, West Virginia
- Worship Leader Institute, Tulsa, Oklahoma

== Video documentaries ==
- Shearon, Stephen, and Mary Nichols, prod. (2010) "I'll Keep On Singing": The Southern Gospel Convention Tradition.
- Hall, Roger, prod. (2010) "Dedication": Singing in Stoughton (William Billings Singing School).
