= Southwest Texas Sacred Harp Singing Convention =

The Southwest Texas Sacred Harp Singing Convention is an annual gathering of shape note singers. Songs are sung a cappella from the Sacred Harp tune book. The convention was organized on April 28, 1900, at the Round Top School House, in Caldwell County, Texas, as the South Union Singing Convention. It is the second oldest continuous Sacred Harp convention in Texas. Several older conventions are no longer extant.

During its history, the Southwest Texas Musical Convention has been held in at least a dozen Texas counties. Originally an annual two or three day convention, the delegates later changed to meet on each fifth weekend of the year. The Convention presently meets on Saturday and Sunday of fifth-Sunday weekends in the spring and fall. The spring session is held at Bethel Primitive Baptist Church, at McMahan, Texas. The fall session is held in Austin, Texas. The current tunebook in use by the convention is The Sacred Harp, Revised Cooper Edition, 2012, first revised by W. M. Cooper and others in 1902.
