= Awake My Soul =

Awake My Soul may refer to:

- "Awake My Soul and with the Sun", a 17th century hymn by Thomas Ken
- Awake, My Soul: The Story of the Sacred Harp, a 2006 documentary film
- A track on Sigh No More (Mumford & Sons album), a 2009 album
- A track on Awake (Hillsong Worship album), a 2019 album
