= Ruth Denson Edwards =

Jarusha Henrietta Denson Edwards, better known as Ruth (July 3, 1893 - April 25, 1978) was a figure in the Sacred Harp movement.

Edwards was the youngest daughter of Thomas Jackson and Amanda Denson; she learned shape note music from her parents. A native of Carrollton, Georgia, she was raised near Helicon, Alabama before attending high school in Cullman. She graduated with honors from Peabody College. In 1917 she married salesman Lewis D. Edwards; the couple was childless, and later divorced. Edwards taught elementary school in Cullman for forty-five years, moving to Jasper upon her retirement in 1962. For many years a member of the chorus at Cullman's First Methodist Church, she was active for much of her life in the Sacred Harp movement, sitting on the revision committees of 1960 and 1966, chairing the 1967 United Convention, and serving for many years as the secretary of the Sacred Harp Publishing Company. She also composed hymns; among her tunes are "Infinite Day," "New Georgia," and "Thou Art God." She continued to lead Sacred Harp sings well into her old age. Edwards was buried in Double Springs, at Fairview Cemetery; in the Alabama Music Hall of Fame she is listed as a "music achiever." A memorial singing was held in her honor in 1981.
