= Judge Jackson =

American songwriter

Judge J. Jackson (March 12, 1883, Montgomery County, Alabama - April 7, 1958, Ozark, Alabama) was an American Sacred Harp composer, songwriter, and educator. His 1934 publication The Colored Sacred Harp was later recognized by scholars such as Doris Dyen and New Grove writer Joe Dan Boyd as an important document of early twentieth-century shape note singing practice.

Jackson was raised in a family of sharecroppers and obtained little formal education as a child. When he was sixteen years old, he left home and took work as a farmhand in Dale County, Alabama, where he settled and eventually earned enough to become a farmer and landowner on his own. He took an interest in the Sacred Harp tradition around the time he moved to Dale County, but his new employer would not allow him to attend the local singing schools, so he learned the technique from his peers instead. He was baptized into Christianity in 1902 and also married that year, and in 1904 began composing lyrics to shape note songs. By the early 1920s, he had moved on to teaching and composing Sacred Harp music, in addition to organizing conventions for the music in the southeast United States.

In 1934, in the midst of the Great Depression, Jackson self-published a 77-song compilation titled The Colored Sacred Harp, which included 18 of his own compositions (17 both words and music, and one music only) and 24 pieces he altered or arranged. Among the pieces in this collection is the Jackson composition "My Mother's Gone," which was eventually adopted into the Cooper revision in the late twentieth century. To finance the publication of The Colored Sacred Harp, Jackson and an associate, Bishop J.D. Walker, paid out of pocket to print 1,000 copies of the text; Jackson then sold the book door-to-door and via singing conventions and educational programs.
