= William Hammond (hymnist) =

English hymnist

- Born: 6 January 1719; Battle, Sussex, England
- Died: 19 August 1783 (aged 64)
- Burial place: Moravian Burial Ground, Chelsea, London
- Occupation: Hymnist

William Hammond (6 January 1719 – 19 August 1783) was an English hymnist. He was born in Battle, Sussex, England. He was educated at Saint John's College, Cambridge. In 1743 he joined the Calvinistic Methodists, and in 1745 joined the Moravian Brethren.

His works include an autobiography in Greek, which has not been published. His original hymns, together with his translations of older Latin hymns, were published in his Psalms, Hymns and Spiritual Songs. Several of his hymns are included in the Sacred Harp. William Hammond is buried in the Moravian cemetery in Chelsea, London.
