= Abraham Wood (composer) =

Early American composer

Abraham Wood (July 30, 1752 – August 6, 1804) was one of the first American composers.

== Life and career ==
Wood was born on July 30, 1752 in Massachusetts Bay Colony in what is today Northborough, Massachusetts. He was a drummer and clerk for the Northborough Minutemen during the American Revolutionary War. His brother Samuel was the captain of the unit. He wrote Warren to commemorate the army officer Joseph Warren (1741–1775), who died courageously in the Battle of Bunker Hill, and he wrote A Hymn on Peace to commemorate the Treaty of Paris that officially ended the Revolutionary War. This work was circulated as single pamphlet instead of part of a larger collection of sacred pieces, which was more common of the time. Wood published his own collection, Divine Songs, in 1789, and published The Columbian Harmony with Joseph Stone in 1793.

Abraham was a fuller; his mill was located on the Assabet River. He married Lydia née Johnson in 1773. They had thirteen children. He died on August 6, 1804 in Northborough.

His work continues to be sung in the shape note tradition. Two of his songs, Marlborough and Worcester, are included in The Sacred Harp, and six in The Shenandoah Harmony.

== Scores ==
Volume 6. Abraham Wood, The Collected Works, edited by Karl Kroeger. 144 pages, ISBN 0-8153-2301-8.

Stone, Joseph, and Wood, Abraham, The Columbian Harmony. IMSLP

== List of works ==
- Worcester (How beauteous are their feet)
- Marlborough
- Warren
- A Hymn on Peace
- Brevity (Man, born of woman)
- Bunker Hill
- Walpole
- Woodbury
- Hopkinton
- Doomsday
- Southborough
- Gethsemane
- An Elegy on the Death of a young Lady
- Musical Captive
- Occom

== Discography ==
- "A Hymn on Peace" and "Warren" on The Birth of Liberty - New World Records
- "Brevity (Man, born of woman)", "Walpole", and "Worcester (How beauteous are their feet)" on Early American Choral Music Volume 2 Anglo-American Psalmody 1550–1800 on Harmonia Mundi
