= Stephen Jenks =

Stephen Jenks (March 17, 1772 – June 3, 1856) was an American teacher, Yankee tunesmith, and tunebook compiler. He was born in Glocester, Rhode Island and raised in Ellington, Connecticut. During his life he moved from town to town, living in Ridgefield and New Canaan, Connecticut, Pound Ridge, New York, and Providence, Rhode Island, finally settling in Thompson, Ohio in 1829. Between 1799 and 1810 he authored and coauthored more than ten printed collections of sacred and secular music; after moving to Ohio, he became a farmer and a maker of percussion instruments.

== The music ==
Stephen Jenks' music is representative of the type of music being written at that time in rural New England America, a cappella and an interest in melodic writing. However, his music contains striking harmonic progressions, unusual dissonances and cross relations. In "Weeping Nature" (The Delights of Harmony, 1804), for example, Jenks seems to revel in the clash of the E major / minor chord or in the song "Sorrow’s Tear," filled with cross relations between C sharp / C natural. Although many of these result from his use of modal harmony and, as previously mentioned, strong melodic writing for the individual parts, his use of these relations is not simply random, they are used to express the text being set. In "Weeping Nature" the lyrics (probably written by Samuel Stennett) concern the death of the body:

With murm’ring eyes she [nature] doth survey
her fellow lump of mortal clay
Destroy’d by Death’s consuming spear
the King of Nature’s dread and fear.

while at the same time urging the pious to the divine will of resignation:

Nature is not subject, we find,
To the Almighty’s sacred mind
She cannot say, “Oh, sov’reign Son,
Thy ways are just, thy will be done.”

The pull of these two worlds presented in the text, the death of the body and the acceptance of this fact in the wait for eternal life beyond, is reflected in the music with the sudden shifts between a minor and C major, resulting in the clash between the G sharp and G natural, even at one point with a cadence of an E major/minor chord.

The group of tunebooks that Stephen Jenks helped release are as follows:

- The New-England Harmonist. Danbury, Connecticut, 1799.
- The Musical Harmonist. New Haven, 1800.
- The American Compiler. Northampton, Mass., 1803 (with Elijah Griswold).
- The Delights of Harmony. New Haven, 1804.
- The Delights of Harmony; or, Norfolk Compiler. Dedham, 1805. online
- Additional Music, to the Delights of Harmony, &c. Dedham, not dated.
- The Delights of Harmony; or, Union Compiler. Dedham, 1806.
- The Jovial Songster. Dedham, 1806 (secular songs).
- The Hartford Collection of Sacred Harmony. Hartford, 1807 (with Elijah Griswold and John C. Frisbie)
- The Royal Harmony of Zion. Dedham, 1810.
- The Christian Harmony. Dedham, 1811.
- The Harmony of Zion; or, Union Compiler. Dedham, 1818.
- The Whistle. Dedham, 1818 (secular songs, words only).

Many of his tunes are still sung at Sacred Harp singings.

== Books and editions ==
- Jenks, Stephen, Complete Works, edited by David Warren Steel ISBN 0-89579-316-4
