= Nehemiah Shumway =

American composer

Nehemiah Shumway (August 26, 1761 – July 1843) was an American composer of sacred music, teacher, and farmer.

== Life ==
Shumway was born in Oxford, Massachusetts, the youngest of seven children of Amos Shumway and Ruth Parker. He graduated from the College of Rhode Island in 1790, and became principal of the Freehold Academy in New Jersey.

Shumway married Sarah/Sara Tice/Tyse on December 10, 1795. She was baptised in Freehold on July 4, 1773, and died in Lyme, New York, in 1831. They had four children together, but no known grandchildren.

Shumway moved to Albany, New York, where his first two sons were born in 1796 and 1798, relocated to Schenectady in around 1800, and returned to Albany in 1806. In 1820 he settled in Lyme; after he lost his farm there through a title defect. A few years later he returned to Freehold, where he died in 1843.

== Music ==
Shumway is best remembered today for two fuguing tunes included in The Sacred Harp, "Schenectady" and "Ballstown," though others, including "Pennsylvania," "Westminster," "Judgment," and "Creation," are still found in shape note books in print as of 2012. He is also believed by some to have been the composer of the tune "New Jordan" (Sacred Harp p. 442), attributed to him by Ananias Davisson.

His sacred tunebook The American Harmony was published in Philadelphia in 1793 (2nd ed. 1801). (Note: There were several publications of this name in the same period.)
