= James Landrum White =

- Born: January 22, 1847
- Died: March 8, 1925 (aged 78)
- Occupations: Singing teacher, composer

James Landrum White (January 22, 1847 – March 8, 1925) was a shape note singing teacher, composer, and a reviser of his father's shape note tunebook known as The Sacred Harp.

== Musical career ==
In 1844, three years before J. L. White's birth, B. F. White and Elisha J. King published The Sacred Harp, using the four-shape shape note system of notation. It was in the musical tradition established by this book that J. L. White would carry out his musical career.

This career was a curious and not entirely successful one. Although J. L. White was the most musically eminent son of the tradition's revered founder, his tastes in sacred music were quite different from his father's--and indeed, from a great number of other Sacred Harp singers. During his career J. L. White was involved in editorial work on at least four tune books, two of which can be viewed as his attempts to reshape the musical practice of the Sacred Harp singing community.

First, during his father's lifetime, J. L. was heavily involved (according to J. S. James) in the 1869–1870 (4th) edition of his father's book.

B. F. White died in 1879. In 1884, J. L. White and his brother, B. F., Jr., released the New Sacred Harp. It was a seven-shape note tune book of 192 pages (a little over 200 songs). Fewer than 20% of its songs were found in the Sacred Harp, and less than 5% of the songs were written in a minor key. Many of the old songs appeared with altered harmony. According to Gavin James Campbell (see reference below), this book was not a success:

Most singers held fast to their disintegrating 1869 editions rather than convert to The New Sacred Harp. Although a few orders continued to trickle in, the Musical Million [a leading shape note periodical] advertised the book for less than a year, and made no mention of it after 1890.

It was, however, probably more popular than previously supposed. For example, in 1891 singers in Leon County, Texas were singing "every Sunday evening, using New Sacred Harp." As late as August 1896, the Withlacoochee Musical Convention, meeting in Berrien County, Georgia, adopted The Sacred New Harp "for the next annual session."

In 1897, White and his nephew Charles P. Byrd, responding to a demand for the older book, issued a reprint of the fourth edition of the Sacred Harp.

In 1909, J.L. White made another effort to modernize the Sacred Harp. This time, he labeled his new book as the fifth edition of The Sacred Harp. The book began with B. F. White's rudiments of music and about 300 pages of music from the fourth edition. Afterward appeared a second rudiments of music section by J. L. White and about 200 pages of new music, much of it in contemporary musical styles. The supplement also included settings of songs from the 1870 Sacred Harp with alto parts added. In the second part of the book, J. L. White undertook to correct his father's "errors in harmony," as he called them, by altering the notes in other parts as well—resulting, as Buell E. Cobb (see reference below) has maintained, in parts that were frequently monotonous and uninteresting to sing.

The 1909 edition not only failed to sell well, but was outright condemned by some Sacred Harp groups. The Cleburne County (Alabama) Sacred Harp Convention pledged that it would continue to use the old Fourth Edition. It called for a new revision, and asked that any new songs in subsequent revisions would "be of the Sacred Harmony and arranged as in the Old Book." The Mulberry River Convention, also of Alabama, asked that any new songs be "composed by Sacred Harp singers only."

White prepared a revised release of the "fifth edition" in 1910, and then scrapped the idea altogether by the next year. In 1911, he released The Sacred Harp, Fourth Edition with Supplement. This was the old 1870 edition with a supplement of newer gospel songs, but none of the reharmonizations of old songs. This 1911 "White Book" contained 597 total songs and was the largest of the early 20th century revisions of the Sacred Harp. In just two years, J. L. White made three attempts to revise the Sacred Harp in a manner that would satisfy Sacred Harp singers.

With the exception of the added gospel songs in close harmony, this 1911 "White Book" is the most traditional of the three early 20th century revisions of the Sacred Harp, reprinting the 1870 book almost "verbatim", removing and/or adding alto parts to only a few of the old songs. Almost 60% of this book's songs are presented in three-part harmonies.

Having satisfied the public's demand for a more traditional book, J. L. White finally experienced a degree of success. During the first quarter of the 20th century, his Fourth Edition with Supplement was a strong competitor among the multiple contending revisions of B. F. White's original book, particularly in areas where James's Original Sacred Harp was also used. To counter White's work, J. S. James brought suit against him, though unsuccessfully, seeking damages for infringement of copyright. The "White Book" became popular in the northern parts of Alabama, Georgia and Mississippi, eastern Tennessee, and some parts of south Georgia. It was used by black singers in northern Mississippi until it was no longer available.

In J. L. White's lifetime, he released one slight revision of the book. After his death, without further revision, and eventually no more printings, the use of his book dwindled to a small following in northwest Georgia. The last printing of the White book was in 1946, although bound photostatic copies were made in 1958 through the generosity of H. A. Patillo. Today its use is continued in several singings held at the Hardeman Primitive Baptist Church in Decatur, Georgia. The book was republished in 2007, the Sacred Harp and folk music revival having finally benefitted it. With the republication, there is some new use of the book.

== Personal biography ==
White was the eighth child of Benjamin Franklin White and Thurza Melvina Golightly. J. L.'s siblings were William Decatur, David Patillo, Robert H., Mary Caroline, Nancy Ogburn, Thurza Melvina, Benjamin Franklin, Jr., and Martha America. The Whites moved to Harris County, Georgia in 1842, where J. L. White was born.

On January 19, 1887, James Landrum White married Mary Melinda (Minnie) Clarke in Fulton County, Georgia. They made their home in the Atlanta area and had four children: Mary, James & Benjamin (twins), and Julian. In addition to teaching music, J. L. farmed and sold pianos. He organized several singing conventions, keyed the music at conventions, sang tenor in the Sacred Harp, and was often a soloist in various churches around Atlanta. J. L. White is buried in the Miller-Clarke Cemetery in Lithonia, Georgia.

== Sources ==
- Campbell, Gavin James (1997) "'Old Can Be Used Instead of New': Shape-Note Singing and the Crisis of Modernity in the New South, 1880–1920." Journal of American Folklore 110:169–188.
- Clarke, Donald Stephen (unpublished) A Chronological History of the Life of Benjamin Franklin White.
- Cobb, Buell E. Jr. (1978, 1989) The Sacred Harp: A Tradition and Its Music University of Georgia Press.
- Jackson, George Pullen (1933) White Spirituals in the Southern Uplands. University of North Carolina Press.
- James, Joseph Stephen (1904) A Brief History of the Sacred Harp and Its Author, B. F. White, Sr., and Contributors. privately printed.
- Vaughn, R. L. (1995) The White Book: J. L. White and his 1911 Revision [printed in "Away Here in Texas" (Vol. 3, No. 5), a former Texas Sacred Harp newsletter].
- Wilkinson, Sandra (n.d.) A Commentary, a 4-page pamphlet for "hand-outs" at J. L. White singings.
