= Robert Sterling Arnold =

American musician and music publisher

Robert Sterling Arnold (January 26, 1905 – February 8, 2003) was an American shape note music publisher, singer, composer, singing school teacher, and the cousin of country western singer, Eddy Arnold. Robert was born at Coleman in Coleman County, Texas, the son of Millard Franklin and Rowena Victoria (Lawrence) Arnold.

Arnold received his musical training from southern shape note teachers such as Mr. & Mrs. J. H. Carr, W. W. Combs, L. A. Gordon, J. B. Herbert, John A. McClung, Will M. Ramsey, and Frank White. He traveled as a member of several quartets, including the Central Music Company Quartet. He also traveled extensively to teach about 300 shape note singing schools.

In 1927, he joined Bill Bynum, Cecil MacDonald, and Bernie Horner to form the Overall Quartet. Sponsored by the J. C. Penney Company, the group wore pressed blue overalls, white shirts, and black bow ties at their concerts. In 1928, he married Cora Angie McDonald, whom he met at a gospel singing at Veribest (near San Angelo, Texas). They lived in Fort Worth, Kennedale and Jefferson, Texas, returning to Coleman in 1975. While in Fort Worth, he had a studio and taught piano and voice. He was the founder and owner of the National Music Company, which company published about fifty singing convention books. Before that he was a partner with Albert E. Brumley and W. Oliver Cooper in the Hartford National Company. Robert and Cora Arnold were members of the Church of Christ.

Some of his more popular songs include Did You Repent, Fully Repent?, Have You Thought, Really Thought?, If I Could But Just Take One Soul To Heaven, and I Wanta Get Right. No Tears in Heaven, written in 1935, is probably his best known song. In addition to its popularity at shape note singings No Tears in Heaven has been recorded by gospel quarters and artists such as Buck Owens, Skeeter Davis, Red Foley, and The Chuck Wagon Gang.

Robert Sterling Arnold is a member of the 2005 Southern Gospel Music Hall of Fame inductees. Arnold was inducted into the Texas Gospel Music Hall of Fame on September 14, 1985. He died in Coleman County at age 98 on February 8, 2003 and was buried in the Silver Valley Cemetery.
