= Southern Musical Convention =

The Southern Musical Convention was the first Sacred Harp musical convention, organized by B. F. White and others in 1845. It was formed at Huntersville in Upson County, Georgia.

From its founding until 1867, White's The Sacred Harp was the "textbook" of the convention. It was a collection of songs notated by shape notes and featuring four-part harmonies. Shape-note singing had been taught by preachers and missionaries during the second Great Awakening, as a way of evangelizing to people on the frontier and in rural areas. They would collect at camp meetings and spend considerable time singing these hymns. The shape notes were an eight-note system used as an easy way to teach people melodies and harmonies for singing sacred music.

After 1867, the Convention adopted a policy of using other song books. It gradually had less influence in the history of Sacred Harp. Under White's leadership, the Southern Musical Convention sponsored three revisions of the Sacred Harp (1850, 1859, 1869). The 1849-1850 committee consisted of B. F. White, Leonard P. Breedlove, E. L. King, Joel King, R. F. M. Mann, A. Ogletree, S. R. Pennick and J. R. Turner. The second revision committee of the Sacred Harp in 1858-1859 consisted of B. F. White, R. F. Ball, J. T. Edmunds, A. Ogletree, E. T. Pound, J. P Reese, T. Waller, and A. S. Webster. The Southern Musical Convention selected White, Edmund Dumas, R. F. M. Mann, Absalom Ogletree and Marion Patrick as the committee to revise the Sacred Harp in 1869–1870.

Not only did the convention provide a gathering for vocal musicians, but it also created an authoritative body to approve of teachers for singing schools. In January 1852, the Convention authorized a newspaper, The Organ, which was published at Hamilton, Georgia the county seat of Harris County. B. F. White was "Superintendent" of the publication.

The Southern Musical Convention supplied the pattern for many subsequent Sacred Harp musical organizations. These included the two oldest existing Sacred Harp Conventions: the Chattahoochee Musical Convention and the East Texas Musical Convention.
