= Elisha J. King =

Compiler of the Sacred Harp

- Born: 1821; Wilkinson County, Georgia, United States
- Died: August 31, 1844 (aged 22–23)
- Occupation: farmer
- Known for: compiler of The Sacred Harp hymnbook
- Parents: John King (father); Elizabeth Dubose (mother)
- Relatives: Elias Lafayette King (younger brother)

Elisha James King (1821–1844) was, with B. F. White, the compiler of The Sacred Harp, a shape note hymnbook that came to be used widely in the rural South. In revised form, the book continues to be popular among singers to this day.

Little is known about King's short life. Steel (2010) suggests that he mostly likely was born in Wilkinson County, Georgia; his parents were named John King and Elizabeth Dubose. The family moved in 1828 to Talbot County.

E. J. King worked as a farmer and also taught singing to others.

It is clear that King was the junior member of the partnership with White (born 1800), who had already had an extensive career as a shape note composer and teacher. The early 20th century Sacred Harp editor Joseph Summerlin James suggested that King was in fact White's pupil. Yet King's musical contribution to the volume was substantial; in the present-day 1991 edition of the Sacred Harp, his name appears on 22 of the tunes as composer, arranger, or co-arranger. Steel describes King as having a distinctive musical style, and describes three of his songs, "Bound for Canaan," "Sweet Canaan," and "Fulfilment" as "classics".

Steel conjectures that King may also have provided the initial financing that would have been needed to persuade the printer (in Philadelphia) to take on the job of producing the book. At the time White was "still establishing himself" as a farmer, but King came from a wealthy family with a large plantation.

The Sacred Harp was first published in 1844; King died 31 August of the same year.

His younger brother Elias Lafayette King (1828–1876) was an important member of the early Sacred Harp community. He served on the committee that prepared the augmented second edition (1850). He contributed six songs to this edition, of which one (308, Parting Friends) remains in the 1991 edition today. Four (Sweet Heaven, Parting Friends, The Lost City, The Cause of Christ) remain in the 2012 Cooper edition of The Sacred Harp.
