= Centralhatchee Creek =

Stream in Georgia, United States

Coordinates: 33°17′25″N 85°05′39″W

Centralhatchee Creek is a stream in the U.S. state of Georgia. It is a tributary to the Chattahoochee River.

Centralhatchee is a name derived from the Muskogean language meaning "fish stream". Variant names are "Sundahatchee Creek" and "Sundalhatchee Creek".
