= Richard DeLong =

Richard Lee DeLong (February 28, 1963 – May 13, 2020) was a leading figure in contemporary Sacred Harp singing. He taught frequently in singing schools and served as the youngest member of the editorial board that created the 1991 Revision of The Sacred Harp, the most widely used book for Sacred Harp singing.

Born in Atlanta, Georgia, DeLong was a "traditional" Sacred Harp singer, meaning that he became a singer by participating as a child, learning from other singers in the rural Southern singing community in which Sacred Harp music is rooted. He related that he was carried to his first singing by his grandmother, Dollie DeLong Hudgins, at the age of six months.

According to the web site of the 2004 Garden State Sacred Harp Singing Convention, DeLong had "taught more than 60 singing schools throughout the U.S. and was invited to teach Sacred Harp singing in England in 2000. He also wrote articles on the history of Sacred Harp and its singers as well as producing several CDs. He participated in the recording session for the [2003] Civil War movie Cold Mountain." More recently, DeLong made a cameo appearance in the 2012 movie on bootlegging Lawless.

DeLong served as Executive Secretary of the Sacred Harp Publishing Company, the publishers of the 1991 Edition, from 2008–2011. He was the composer of two songs in this volume, "Big Creek" (p. 494, 1986) and "Corley" (p. 510, 1988; arranged from John Wilson).

DeLong was frequently seen at singing conventions. He taught singing schools in 28 states, plus D.C. and participated in singings in 38 states. His own singing voice, familiar to many singers, was a robust and powerful tenor. He dedicated his life to collecting over 1500 hours of recordings from several collections. These date from 1939 to 2011. He also had a varied collection of tune books including every "Sacred Harp" from 1850 to present.

In addition to his work with Sacred Harp, DeLong was a high school economics, AP US History and world history teacher in Carrollton, Georgia.
