= A. M. Cagle =

American hymnwriter (1884–1968)

A 2016 performance of "Soar Away" in Glover, Vermont

Alfred Marcus Cagle (October 5, 1884 – December 19, 1968) was an American hymnwriter known for his activities with the Sacred Harp movement.

Cagle was born in Cedartown, Georgia, the son of Jesse Martin Cagle and Samaria Duke, and grew up in Cullman County, Alabama. There he took lessons with S. M. Denson; at the same time he worked on the farm belonging to Denson's brother T.J., with whom he also studied music. It was to the latter that he showed his first compositions, the tunes "New Hope" and "Present Joys", which were published in the Union Harp of 1909 and the Original Sacred Harp of 1911. As an adult Cagle lived in Cullman and Birmingham, Alabama, prior to moving to Atlanta. Professionally he was employed as a bookkeeper, bank employee, and traveling salesman. At his retirement he moved to Villa Rica, Georgia. Called "the territory’s preeminent singer, leader, and keyer of music", he would return to Cullman regularly for singings even after having moved from the area in 1937.

Cagle possessed a bass voice, and was known for his skill as a composer of shape note hymns. Of these, two, "Sacred Mount" and "Soar Away", first appeared in the 1936 Denson Revision of the Original Sacred Harp. He also keyed many singings, and may be heard in this role on a recording of the 1959 United Convention which took place in Fyffe, Alabama. For the 1960 revision he chaired the music committee; he was also a member of the music committee for the revision of 1966. He remained active in the Sacred Harp movement until his death, discussing matters of tempo and pitching for singings with various writers. He instructed other musicians as well, including Hugh McGraw. An obituary appeared in the introduction to the 1971 Denson revision.

Described as possessing "a handsome figure and dynamic (and volatile) personality", Cagle was married three times. His first wife was Maggie Frances Denson, daughter of T. J. and his wife Amanda; the couple had three children before their divorce. His second wife was Lena Rose Drake, daughter of L. B. Drake of Coweta County, Georgia. After her death, which occurred around 1959, he married Inez Lee. Cagle was also, briefly, the brother-in-law of T. J. Denson, who married his elder sister, Lille Florida Cagle, in September 1910, a union which was quickly dissolved. His cousin Ida was the wife of Sacred Harp composer Lee Andrew McGraw.
