= Thomas Jackson Denson =

American musician and educator

Thomas Jackson Denson (January 20, 1863 – September 14, 1935) was an Alabama musician and singing school teacher within the Sacred Harp tradition.

== Family and marriage ==
He was the youngest of the four sons of the Levi Phillip Denson, a farmer, a gold miner in Arbacoochee, Cleburne County and a Methodist minister, and Julia Ann Jones Denson. Thomas J. Denson was born in 1863 in Arbacoochee and named after Stonewall Jackson. He was married to Amanda Burdette, a music and literary teacher, a singer, and song composer, until her death in 1910; she was the younger sister of Sidney Burdette, his brother's wife. They had five children: two sons, Paine W. Denson and William Howard Denson; and three daughters, Anna Eugenia Denson, Maggie Francis Denson, and Jarusha (Aunt Rush/Ruth) Henrietta Denson. In 1914, he married Lola Mahalia Akers, with whom he had three daughters: Violet Denson Hinton, Vera Denson Nunn, and Tommye Mahalia Denson Mauldin.

== Career ==
Along with his brother Seaborn McDaniel Denson, Thomas Denson formed the Sacred Harp Publishing Co. In 1933 they purchased the rights to the 1911 J. S. James Sacred Harp and began a revision of it. This revision, known as the Original Sacred Harp (Denson Revision), was published in 1936. A. M. Cagle worked for Denson early in his life, and took lessons with the elder musician as well; Denson would go on to become Cagle's brother-in-law for a brief time.

Thomas J. Denson was a popular singing school professor and taught singing schools from Georgia to Texas. Some claim that he taught more Sacred Harp singers than any other man. He was affectionately known to many as "Uncle Tom."

== Recognition ==
A granite monument to the memory of Thomas J. and Seaborn M. Denson was erected on the courthouse square in Double Springs, Alabama. This was done in 1944, the centennial year of the Sacred Harp. Part of the inscription reads, "By the loving hands of their families, pupils of their singing schools, and legions of singers and friends." .

== Death ==
Thomas J. Denson died September 14, 1935. When he died suddenly in a community near Jasper, Alabama, he was preparing to go to a singing. Mrs. Edwards wrote in the hymnal: "Birmingham news reporters estimated a crowd of 15,000 people in attendance" at Fairview Cemetery in Double Springs His brother Seaborn died in 1936, and Tom's son, Paine Denson worked with his sister Ruth Denson Edwards and other members of the revision committee to see the "Denson" edition of the Sacred Harp through to completion.
