= Hugh McGraw =

American Sacred Harp singer (1931–2017)

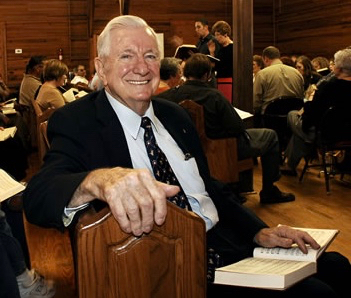
- McGraw in 1982

Background information
- Born: February 20, 1931; Centralhatchee, Georgia, U.S.
- Origin: Bremen, Georgia, U.S.
- Died: May 28, 2017 (aged 86)
- Genres: Sacred Harp
- Occupations: Businessman, singer, composer
- Instrument: Vocals
- Years active: 1953–2017

Hugh McGraw (February 20, 1931 – May 28, 2017) was a leading figure in contemporary Sacred Harp singing. He was the General Chairman of the committee that created the 1991 Denson revision of The Sacred Harp and played an important role in promoting the spread of Sacred Harp singing. Sacred Harp scholar Buell Cobb has called him "perhaps the chief promoter and good will agent of Sacred Harp music".

== Life ==
He was born in Centralhatchee, Georgia to John Wesley McGraw, a railroad worker, and Lillie Ashley, who worked as a seamstress at the Sewell Manufacturing Company. When he was about three months old, his family moved to Villa Rica, Georgia, where he lived to the age of 12. At that time, the family moved to Bremen, Georgia. In adulthood he pursued a career in business in Bremen, managing a clothing manufacturing plant.

While he grew up, he was not a Sacred Harp singer, but was acquainted with the tradition. In an interview conducted in connection with his award of a National Endowment for the Arts National Heritage Fellowship (1982), he remarked:

The McGraw family has been involved in Sacred Harp music for well over a hundred years, but I didn't get involved until I was 25 years old. I'd go to a singing with my mother and father, but I thought it was more important to stay outside and play in the spring and run around the house than it was to learn this tradition.

His involvement with Sacred Harp singing began when he attended a singing session in 1953. There, he developed an instant strong enthusiasm, and persuaded a second cousin (his "Uncle Bud" McGraw, a singing school teacher) to teach him about Sacred Harp music. He also sought out lessons from A. M. Cagle. McGraw then became a Sacred Harp composer, several of whose songs appear in the 1960 and subsequent editions of The Sacred Harp.

== Leadership in the Sacred Harp community ==
Sacred Harp scholars Buell Cobb and John Bealle, cited below, describe a Sacred Harp career containing several major accomplishments. McGraw helped stem the decline of Sacred Harp singing on its original home territory by offering a great number of singing schools, a practice he continued throughout his life. He modernized the nonprofit company that publishes the "Denson" edition of the book, the Sacred Harp Publishing Company, and presided over the committees that created both the 1971 version and the current 1991 version of this edition. He was also a member of the 1960 committee. He led the Sacred Harp Publishing Company into the business of creating recordings of Sacred Harp music, made by groups of experienced singers and serving to this day as a valuable source of information on traditional singing practices. McGraw also made many gestures of friendship to newcomer singers, including those outside the South, and can be considered one of the factors responsible for the extensive geographic spread of Sacred Harp singing in recent decades.

Bealle notes that during the mid to late 1970s, McGraw repeatedly urged newcomer singers to adopt the traditional forms of the Southern singing convention, including the hollow square seating arrangement, rotating leading of songs, singing of the note names before the stanzas, dinner on the grounds, and public prayer. McGraw's efforts were successful, and with time Sacred Harp singing outside the South evolved from a kind of artificially-cultivated folk music performance into a more natural and spontaneous experience, in which procedure and performance practice are determined by well-established custom.
