= Joseph Stephen James =

Joseph Stephen James, of Douglasville, Georgia, was a lawyer, community leader, shape note singer, composer, and a reviser of the tunebook known as The Sacred Harp.

== Life ==
Joe S. James was born March 20, 1849, in Campbell County (now in Douglas County), the son of Stephen and Martha (Shipleigh) James. He was an attorney and was active in local civic and political life. He was the first mayor of Douglasville, was instrumental in the establishment of Douglasville College, in obtaining the city's first water and phone systems, and in bringing several industries to the city. James held membership in the Methodist Church and the Masonic Lodge. He was owner and editor of The New South, newspaper of the city of Douglasville.

J. S. James married Margaret Elizabeth Maxwell in 1869, and they had seven children: Margaret Odessa, Stephen Edwin, Infant twin sons, Eunice Lettitia, Lois Cleveland, and Joe S., Jr. He died in 1931 and is buried in Douglasville, Georgia.

== As Sacred Harp singer and leader ==
In Sacred Harp singing, J. S. James was important as a musical leader, as an author of prose works, and as a tunebook editor. His works include A Brief History of the Sacred Harp and Its Author, B. F. White, Sr., and Contributors (1904), Union Harp and History of Songs (1909), Sacred Tunes and Hymns (1913), Explanation of the Sacred Harp (1920) and, probably most important, the Original Sacred Harp. The latter tunebook was released in 1911. It added alto parts to most of the songs and restored several songs that had been deleted in the 1869-70 revision of The Sacred Harp by B. F. White and the Southern Musical Convention. James supervised the revision and was head over a revision committee appointed by the United Sacred Harp Musical Association. This edition continued a tradition that stemmed from B. F. White's own time and in turn was extended in the so-called "Denson" revisions, which form the basis of the 1991 Edition, now the most widely used Sacred Harp volume. (For details of this history, see Sacred Harp.)

James' 1911 book quickly embroiled him in two controversies. He was sued by W. M. Cooper, editor of a rival Sacred Harp edition, for plagiarism of the alto parts as written by Cooper. James brought a suit against J. L. White for White's revision of The Sacred Harp, claiming infringement of copyright and seeking $3000 in damages.

James led in organizing the United Sacred Harp Musical Association in 1904, which he hoped would function as a sort of "National Association" of Sacred Harp singings and conventions.

== Sources ==
- A Brief History of the Sacred Harp and Its Author, B. F. White, Sr., and Contributors, by Joe S. James, privately printed, 1904.
- Introduction and History of the Original Sacred Harp, by Ruth Denson Edwards, (in the 1971 Edition, Original Sacred Harp).
- Newspaper Accounts from the Atlanta Constitution and Atlanta Journal of the United Sacred Harp Musical Association, 1904-1956, compiled by John Plunkett.
- The Sacred Harp: A Tradition and Its Music, by Buell E. Cobb, Jr., University of Georgia Press, 1978, 1989.
- White Spirituals in the Southern Uplands, by George Pullen Jackson, University of North Carolina Press, 1933.
- Steel, David Warren with Richard Hulan (2010) The Makers of the Sacred Harp. Urbana: University of Illinois Press.
