= Joseph Stephenson (composer) =

English composer

Joseph Stephenson (1723 – 19 July 1810) was an English composer of West Gallery music. He was born in Poole, Dorset, in 1723; baptised on 17 October 1723; and died in Poole on 19 July 1810.
