= Seaborn McDaniel Denson =

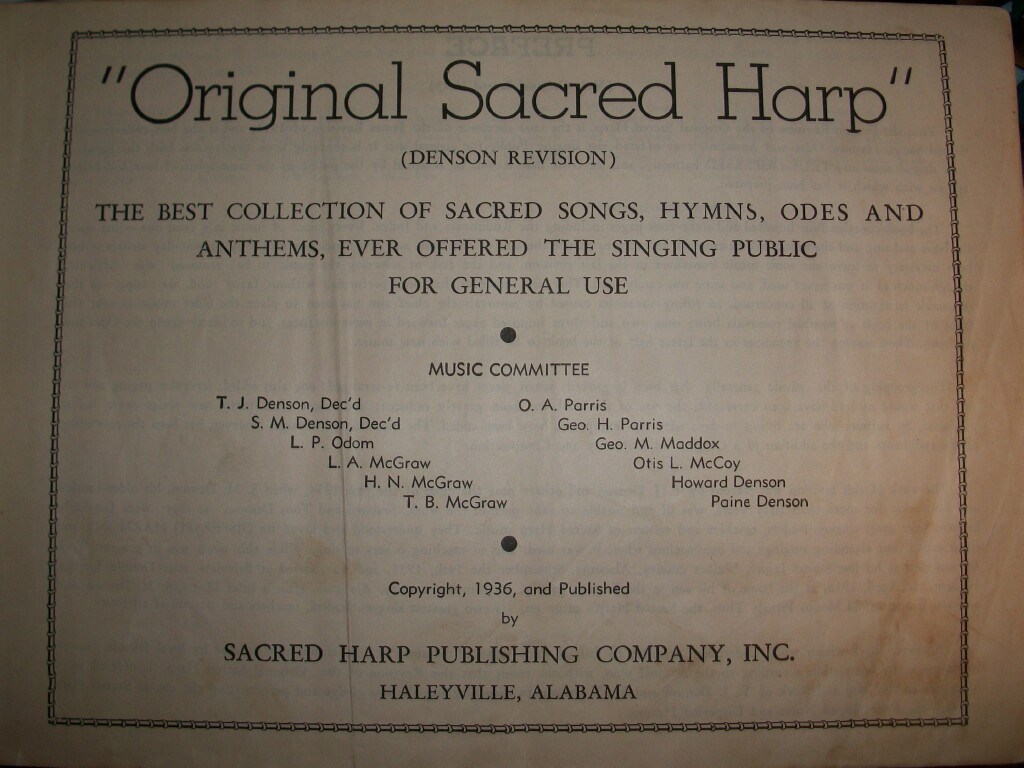
"Original Sacred Harp (Denson Revision)"

Seaborn McDaniel Denson (1854 – April 18, 1936) was a notable Alabama musician and singing school teacher within the Sacred Harp tradition. He was a son of The Rev. Levi Phillips Denson, a Methodist minister, and Julia Ann Jones Denson. Seaborn Denson was born April 9, 1854, in Arbacoochee, Alabama. He married Sidney Burdette.

S. M. Denson wrote most of the alto lines that were added to the 1911 J. S. James Original Sacred Harp. Along with his brother Thomas Jackson Denson, Seaborn Denson formed the Sacred Harp Publishing Co. In 1933 they purchased the rights to James' Sacred Harp and began a revision. This revision, known as the Original Sacred Harp (Denson Revision), was published in 1936. Both died before its publication and Paine Denson, Thomas J.'s son, saw the "Denson" edition of the Sacred Harp through to completion.

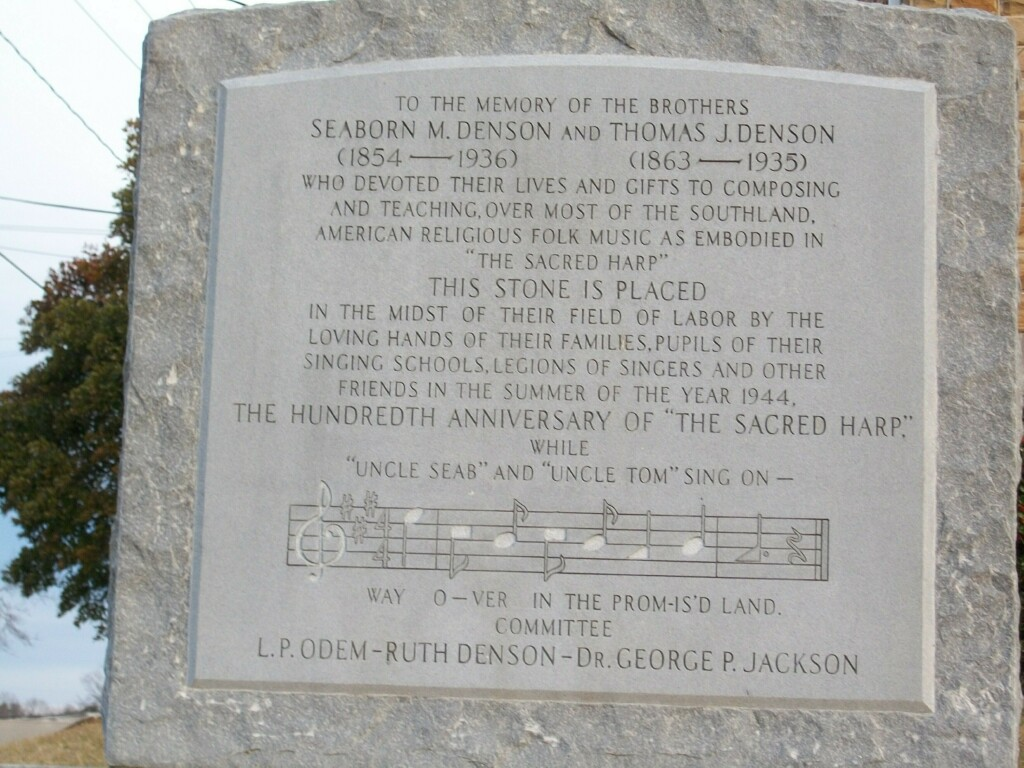
Monument in Double Springs, AL

A granite monument to the memory of Thomas J. and Seaborn M. Denson was erected on the courthouse square in Double Springs, Alabama. This was done in 1944, the centennial year of the Sacred Harp. Part of the inscription reads "By the loving hands of their families, pupils of their singing schools, and legions of singers and friends."

A. M. Cagle, himself later to become an important figure in the Sacred Harp movement, studied music under Seaborn Denson.
