= Wilson Marion Cooper =

Wilson Marion Cooper (December 17, 1850 – July 17, 1916) of Dothan, Alabama, was a notable musician and music teacher within the Sacred Harp tradition. Marion Cooper was born in Henry County, Alabama, the son of W. S. and Elizabeth Ann (Oates) Cooper. He was a cousin of Alabama governor William C. Oates.

== Overview ==
W. M. Cooper prepared a revision of B. F. White's tune book The Sacred Harp in 1902. In the revision, some songs were transposed to a different key, and some of the old tune names changed to descriptive titles based on the words of the hymns. Some old songs were removed and new songs added in their places.

Perhaps the most significant contribution of his book was adding alto parts to the songs, the majority of which were originally written with three vocal lines (treble, tenor, bass). Cooper wrote most of the alto lines himself, though his daughter Anna Blackshear and other individuals made important contributions. Believing this was significant and unique, Cooper sued J. S. James after James in 1911 released an edition of The Sacred Harp also including alto parts. James' alto parts (many of which were written by S. M. Denson) were very close to those supplied to the songs by Cooper. In 1914, a judge found in favor of James, concluding, "An alto may be an improvement to a song to some extent, and probably is; but it can hardly be said to be an original composition, at least in the sense of the copyright law.... In my opinion Mr. James has not infringed any legal rights of Cooper to the Sacred Harp..."

Some musicologists believe that the addition of alto to the songs of the Sacred Harp substantially changed their texture. In "The Alto Parts in the 'True Dispersed Harmony' of The Sacred Harp Revisions", Wallace McKenzie argues that the added altos, especially of the Cooper book, follow principles of "true dispersed harmony" and do not greatly change the texture of the music. McKenzie wrote, "Cooper's altos maintain some features of the contrapuntal-harmonic style described above somewhat more closely than do those of Denson.... In both books, however, the alto melodies are consistent with the contrapuntal-harmonic style of the three-part pieces."

Cooper's added alto parts in the style and texture of White and King's Sacred Harp reveal a knowledge of and loyalty to the tradition. However, Cooper chose to add another style of song to the existing tradition—the late 19th century gospel song. During this period, the seven-shape notation and gospel style were seriously encroaching on the Sacred Harp's territory and popularity. The Ruebush-Kieffer Publishing Company and others were making "seven-shapes" the standard notation of the South. Some Sacred Harp leaders (particularly James and his colleagues) responded by rejecting both the gospel style and the seven-shape notation. Cooper maintained the four-shape notation, but incorporated some of the gospel style songs into his book—for example, Beautiful River (Shall We Gather at the River) and Sweet By and By. Cooper also experimented with placing the notation on two staves instead of four, but this was rejected by his supporters.

The Cooper revision of the Sacred Harp was widely adopted in many areas of the South, such as Florida, southern Alabama, south Georgia and Texas, where it has continued as the predominant Sacred Harp book to this day. The "Cooper book," as it is often called, was revised by Cooper himself in 1907 and 1909; and since then has been supervised by an editorial committee, which produced new editions in 1927, 1950, 1960, 1992, 2000, 2006, and 2012. Recent research has revealed that a few songs were added to the book between 1909 and 1927.

Cooper also edited a monthly musical periodical, Zion Songster, at Dothan in the early part of the 20th century.

== Family ==
Cooper married Mary S. Hayes, daughter of George W. and Nancy Hayes. His children include George Hayes Cooper (1880–1929); A. W. Cooper (1886–1911), who served as a lawyer in Dothan and Luverne; and Anna L. Cooper (Mrs. R. D. Blackshear 1877–1957), who assisted her father in writing alto parts for the revision. She and her husband, Dr. Randall David Blackshear (1861–1941), owned and published the Revised Sacred Harp after Cooper's death.

In addition to music, W. M. Cooper's activities included working as a farmer, school teacher, and insurance agent. He is known to have lived in at least four Alabama counties—Coffee, Dale, Henry and Houston. He ran for Houston County Superintendent of Schools in 1912. Mary died in 1901 and is buried at the Old Tabernacle Methodist Cemetery in Coffee County, Alabama.

W. M. Cooper died in Palm Beach, Florida and is buried in the Dothan City Cemetery in Houston County, Alabama.

== Bibliography ==
- "The Alto Parts in the 'True Dispersed Harmony' of The Sacred Harp Revisions", Wallace McKenzie (The Musical Quarterly, 1989, 73:153–171)
- The Sacred Harp: A Tradition and Its Music, by Buell E. Cobb, Jr. 2001. Athens: University of Georgia Press. ISBN 0-8203-2371-3
