= Benjamin Franklin White =

American hymn writer

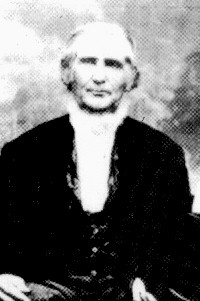
Benjamin Franklin White

Benjamin Franklin White (September 20, 1800 – December 5, 1879) was a shape note "singing master", and compiler of the shape note tunebook known as The Sacred Harp. He was born near Cross Keys in Union County, South Carolina, the twelfth child of Robert and Mildred White.

== Musical career ==
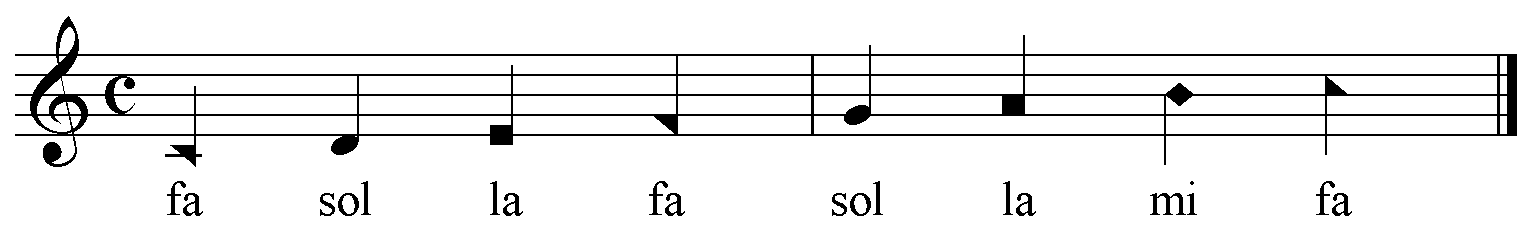
Four shape system of notation

White and Elisha J. King published The Sacred Harp in 1844, using the four-shape shape note notation. King died in 1844. In 1845, White led in the establishment of the Southern Musical Convention. In 1850, he issued a second edition of The Sacred Harp, adding 97 songs and 103 pages. With the 1850 and future editions, White was assisted by a musical committee appointed by the Southern Musical Convention. In 1859, a third edition of The Sacred Harp was released, adding 74 more songs on 63 pages. A fourth edition came out in 1869. For the first time, in this revision White replaced old songs with new ones, rather than simply adding the new songs to the back of the book. A year later, he released a copyright of the same book signed only by himself and his son, D. P. White, perhaps clarifying ownership. In 1911, White's youngest son, James Landrum White, reissued this fourth edition with a supplement of newer gospel songs. White also taught music; among his pupils was Sarah Lancaster.

White served as Clerk of the Inferior Court of Harris County, and mayor of Whitesville, Georgia.

== As journalist ==
In 1852, B. F. White was named as Superintendent of the first newspaper published in Harris County, The Organ, which was "published by authority of the Southern Musical Convention". This newspaper, published in Hamilton, Georgia, served a double purpose: it printed various local and national news stories, taken from major newspapers or off the telegraph, but was also meant as a musical publication. Among the musical materials it included were "songs, minutes of singing conventions, musical debates, letters from singers, and advertisements for books." White participated with gusto in a number of debates about music in the pages of this paper.

A few songs appear in the W. M. Cooper edition of The Sacred Harp with the mysterious notation "For the Organ". This notation, otherwise baffling in a tradition that is firmly a cappella, apparently indicates their original publication in the newspaper.

== Family life and descendants ==
Benjamin F. White married Thurza Melvina Golightly on December 30, 1825 in Spartanburg District, SC. William Walker, publisher of the Southern Harmony, married Thurza's sister, Amy. The Whites moved from Spartanburg District, SC to Harris County, Georgia in 1842.

To B. F. and Thurza were born nine children: William Decatur, David Patillo, Robert H., Mary Caroline, Nancy Ogburn, Thurza Melvina, Benjamin Franklin, Jr., James Landrum, and Martha America. Of these, David Patillo, James Landrum, and Benjamin Franklin, Jr. grew up to be prominent figures in Sacred Harp singing.

== Death and eulogy ==
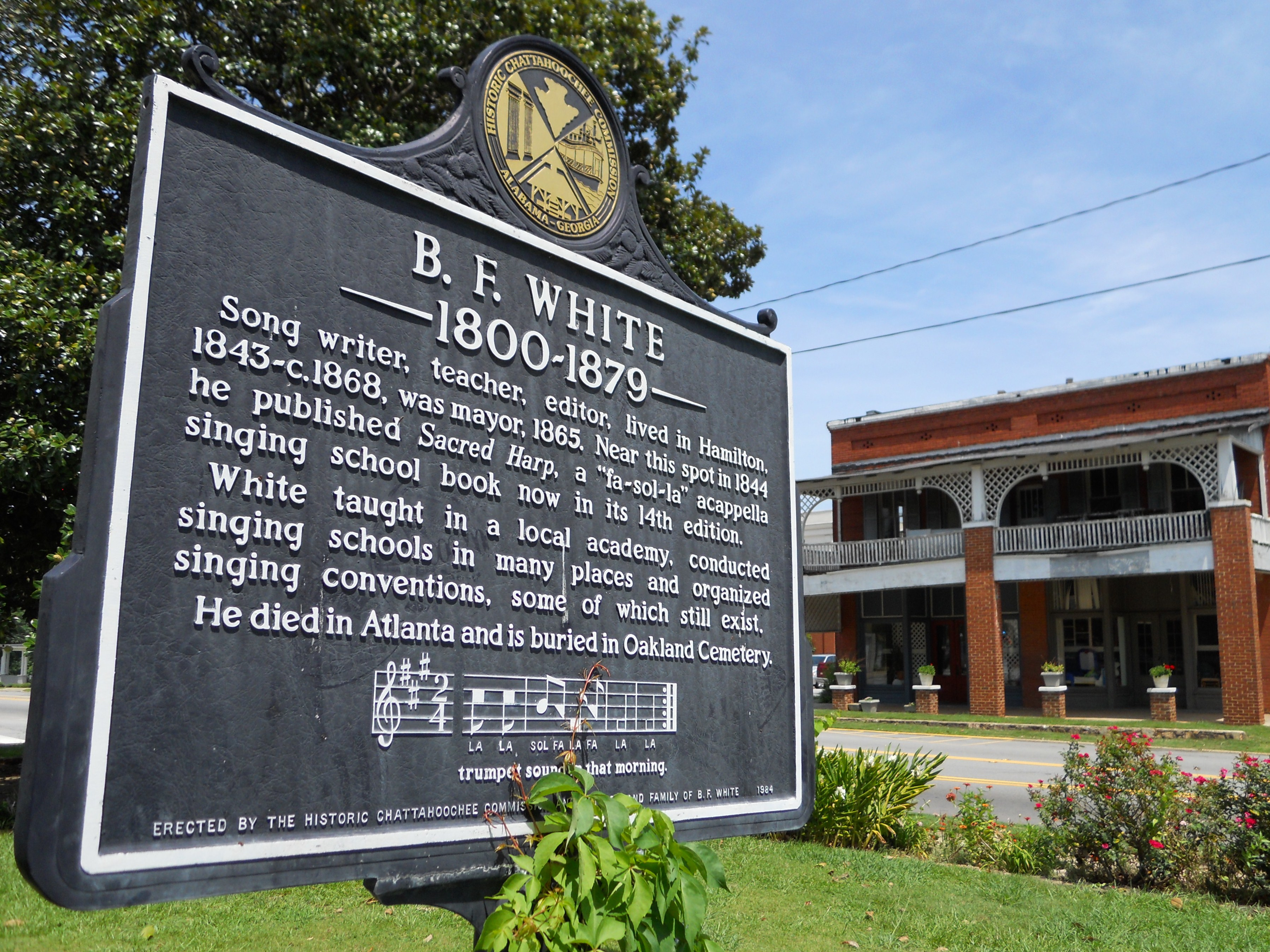
A historic marker in the town square in Hamilton, Georgia commemorates the life and legacy of B. F. White.

B. F. White died in 1879 and was buried in the Oakland Cemetery in Atlanta, Georgia. The following year, members of the Chattahoochee Musical Convention eulogized him thus:

After teaching twenty years, his soul became so bounding with music that he could not rest until he had the satisfaction of seeing his own productions and the many rich collections from his co-laborers in one grand compilation--the Sacred Harp, 1844. He was highly delighted with the circulation of the work.--He was charmed with each revision and edition, with their appendices, millions of copies of which have been sold throughout the land. ... Thousands and tens of thousands have enjoyed the music found alone in the Sacred Harp. ...

Maj[or] White was never more at home than when surrounded with a band of sweet singers ... He was spirited and never failed to animate all whom he led. ... All were naturally drawn toward him as he discoursed upon music and its charms.

White is the namesake of the shape note tune "White" by Edmund Dumas.
