= Sacred Harp =

Tradition of sacred choral music

"186 (Sherburne)" from the Sacred Harp
Performed by the Alabama Sacred Harp Singers

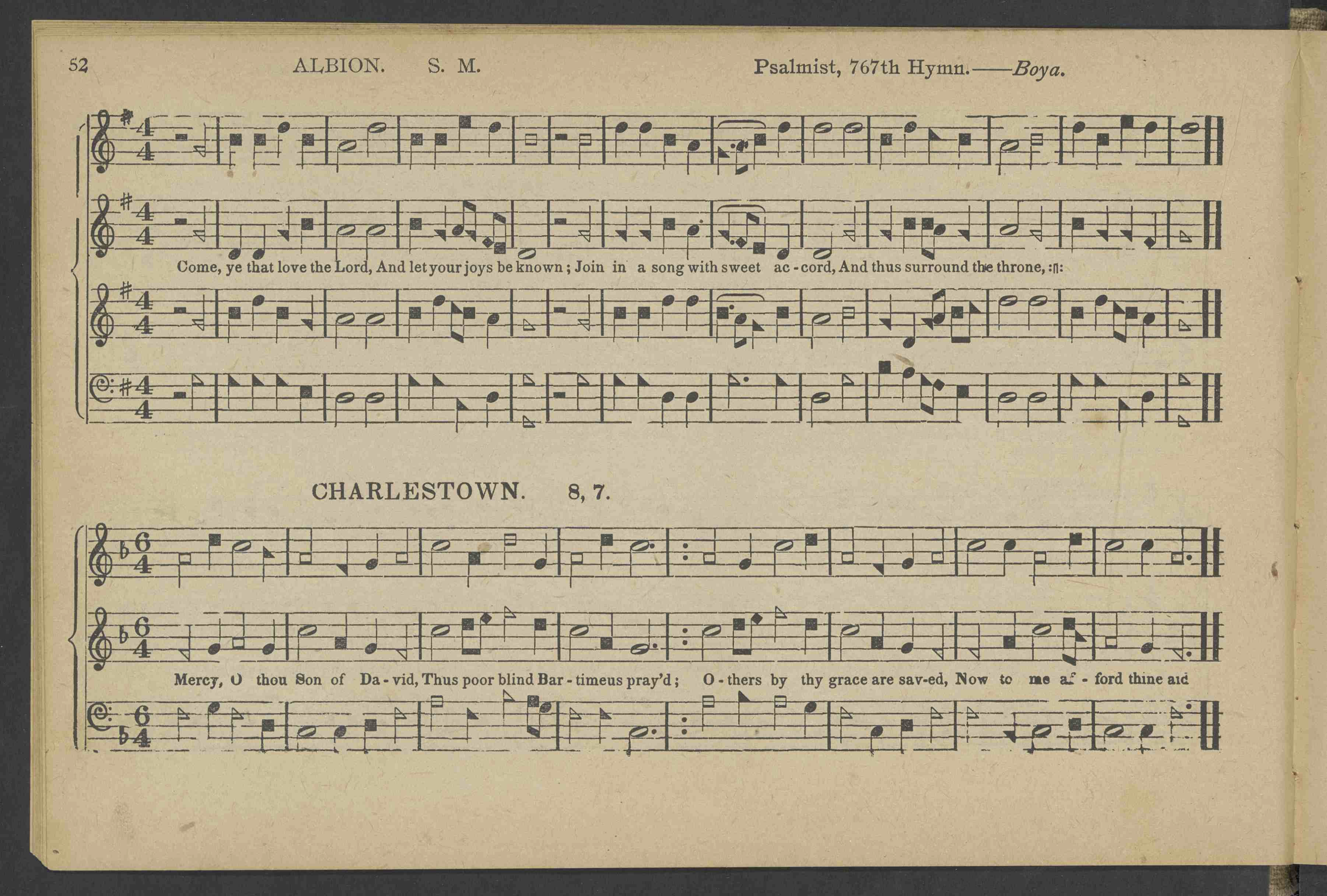
Page 52 from The Sacred Harp, fourth edition (1870), showing the four-shape notation and the traditional oblong layout

Sacred Harp singing is a tradition of sacred choral music which developed in New England and perpetuated in the American South. The name is derived from The Sacred Harp, a historically important shape-note tunebook printed in 1844; multiple subsequent revisions of the tunebook have remained in use since. Sacred Harp singing has roots in the singing schools that developed over the period 1770 to 1820 in and around New England, related development under the influence of "revival" services around the 1840s. This music was included in, and became profoundly associated with, books using the shape note style of notation popular in America in the 18th and early 19th centuries.

Sacred Harp music is sung a cappella (voice only, without instruments) and originated as Protestant music. The contemporary Sacred Harp tradition includes singers and events in the American South (the historic locus of Sacred Harp singing) but also across the United States as well as several other countries, particularly the UK and Germany.

== The music and its notation ==
The name of the tradition comes from the title of the shape-note book from which the music is sung, The Sacred Harp. This book exists today in various editions, discussed below.

In shape-note music, notes are printed in special shapes that help the reader identify them on the musical scale. There are two prevalent systems, one using four shapes, and one using seven. In the four-shape system used in The Sacred Harp, each of the four shapes is connected to a particular syllable, fa, sol, la, or mi, and these syllables are employed in singing the notes, just as in the more familiar system that uses do, re, mi, etc. (see solfege). The four-shape system is able to cover the full musical scale because each syllable-shape combination other than mi is assigned to two distinct notes of the scale. For example, the C major scale would be notated and sung as follows:

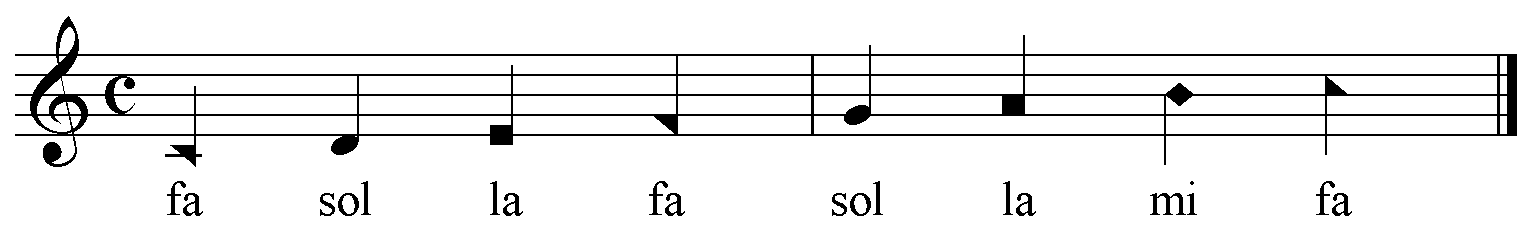
The C major scale in shape notes

The shape for fa is a triangle, sol an oval, la a rectangle, and mi a diamond.

In Sacred Harp singing, pitch is not absolute. The shapes and notes designate degrees of the scale, not particular pitches. Thus for a song in the key of C, fa designates C and F; for a song in G, fa designates G and C, and so on; hence it is called a moveable "do" system.

When Sacred Harp singers begin a song, they normally start by singing it with the appropriate syllable for each pitch, using the shapes to guide them. For those in the group not yet familiar with the song, the shapes help with the task of sight reading. The process of reading through the song with the shapes also helps fix the notes in memory. Once the shapes have been sung, the group then sings the verses of the song with their printed words.

== Singing Sacred Harp music ==
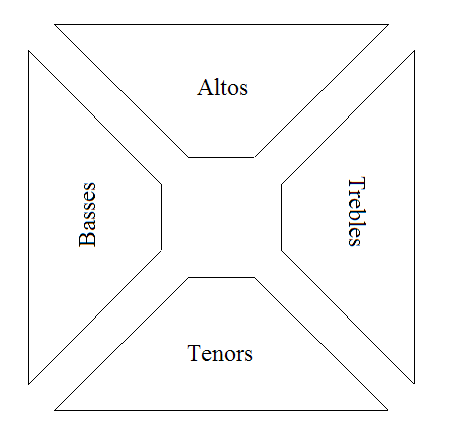
The hollow-square seating arrangement for Sacred Harp singing

Performance in Alabama of the tune "Schenectady", 2011

Sacred Harp groups always sing a cappella, that is to say, without accompanying instruments. The singers arrange themselves in a hollow square, with rows of chairs or pews on each side assigned to each of the four parts: treble, alto, tenor, and bass. The treble and tenor sections are usually mixed, with men and women singing the notes an octave apart.

There is no single leader or conductor; rather, the participants take turns in leading. The leader for a particular round selects a song from the book, and "calls" it by its page number. Leading is done in an open-palm style, standing in the middle of the square facing the tenors.

The pitch at which the music is sung is relative; there is no instrument to give the singers a starting point. At a given singing event, one or more people are designated "keyers"; they are responsible for choosing the key at which the song will be sung and intoning it to the group. The singers reply with the opening notes of their own parts, and then the song begins immediately. Leaders have the option of keying their own songs, if they are able and choose to do so.

=== Musical style ===
As the name implies, the tunes in the Sacred Harp and related tunebooks are predominantly sacred music and originated as music sung by Protestant Christians (though the singing context derives from singing schools rather than church services). Many of the songs in the book are hymns that use words, meters, and stanzaic forms familiar from elsewhere in Protestant hymnody. However, many other Sacred Harp songs are quite different from mainstream hymns in their musical style: some, known as fuguing tunes, contain sections that are polyphonic in texture, and the harmony tends to deemphasize the interval of the third in favor of fourths and fifths. In their melodies, the songs often use the pentatonic scale or similar "gapped" (fewer than seven-note) scales. The harmonic and contrapuntal style of Sacred Harp singing is often referred to as "dispersed harmony".

In their musical form, Sacred Harp songs fall into three basic types. Many are ordinary hymn tunes, mostly composed in four-bar phrases and sung in multiple verses. Fuguing tunes contain at least one prominent passage, usually after a homophonic opening couplet, in which each of the four choral parts enters in succession, in a way resembling a fugue. Anthems are songs with non-metrical text drawn (in whole or in part) directly from scripture; they are sung through just once rather than in multiple verses, and tend to be longer than hymn tunes and fuging tunes.

Sacred Harp singing deviates in several respects from typical choral music. It is not generally rehearsed or performed for an audience: singers participate for the sake of the experience in itself, as well as for the sake of the friendships and social ties of the community (many also engage with singing as a spiritual or religious experience). Songs are generally sung in strict time, without pauses at the ends of phrases. A prominent feature of the vocal style is accent: instead of phrases being sung legato (as is typical in much choral singing), downbeats are sung louder than offbeats, enhancing a shared feeling of pulse and providing rhythmic interest to the singing experience. Especially at large singings, the volume of the sound is generally loud (with singers using "full voice").

Although Sacred Harp singing is heavily reliant on the printed book, the style of singing and social customs are also transmitted orally. In some cases, singers deviate from the music in specific ways that cannot necessarily be assumed from the book itself (for example, raising the 6th scale degree in many minor songs, or observing unwritten repeats).

=== Teaching music in the Sacred Harp style ===
Sacred Harp music continues to be taught in "singing schools" by members of the singing community.

The Sacred Harp, as is typical of shape-note tunebooks, contains a section on rudiments, describing the basics of music and Sacred Harp singing.

=== Books in contemporary use ===
The most common tunebook in the Sacred Harp tradition is The Sacred Harp: 2025 Edition, published by the Sacred Harp Publishing Company; David Ivey was the editorial chair for this revision. This book is used as the principal or only book at the majority of major singing events (known as "conventions" and "all-day singings"). This book is often known as the "Denson Book" (from the principal editor of previous editions in its revision lineage). Work on this revision began in 2018; the first public singing from this revision took place with the 2025 session of the United Sacred Harp Musical Association on September 13–14; it has a green cover. The 2025 Edition replaces the 1991 Edition of the Sacred Harp Publishing Company, but the 1991 Edition is still used by some singing conventions. Previous editions date back to 1911.

Also commonly used is The Sacred Harp, Revised Cooper Edition (2012), colloquially known as the "Cooper Book" or the "blue book". It has significant overlap in contents with the Denson Book but a different revision history dating back to a 1902 revision. The Cooper Book contains a much higher proportion of songs influenced by gospel music than the Denson Book. In some regions, the Cooper Book is the primary edition of the Sacred Harp used; elsewhere, some singers appreciate it as a secondary book that provides variety.

Many Sacred Harp singers also sing from other tunebooks. Several of these have histories and communities of their own, and many continue to be edited and revised to fit the needs of contemporary participants. Many who sing from these tunebooks, however, are also familiar with the more prominent Sacred Harp editions. These other books include:

- Less common editions of the Sacred Harp, such as the J. L. White book (1911, last reprinted in 2007)
- Other historical four-shape tunebooks, such as the Missouri Harmony (last revised in 2005) or Judge Jackson's Colored Sacred Harp (1934, last reprinted in 1993)
- Seven-shape tunebooks such as The Christian Harmony (last revised in 2010) and Harmonia Sacra (last revised in 2008)
- Contemporary tunebooks such as the Shenandoah Harmony (2013).

=== Venues for singing ===
Sacred Harp singing normally occurs not in church services, but in special gatherings or "singings" arranged for the purpose. Singings can be local, regional, statewide, or national. Small singings are often held in homes, with perhaps only a dozen singers. Large singings have been known to have more than a thousand participants. The more ambitious singings include an ample potluck dinner in the middle of the day, traditionally called "dinner on the grounds".

Some of the largest and oldest annual singings are called "conventions". The oldest Sacred Harp convention was the Southern Musical Convention, organized in Upson County, Georgia in 1845. The two oldest surviving Sacred Harp singing conventions are the Chattahoochee Musical Convention (organized in Coweta County, Georgia in 1852), and the East Texas Sacred Harp Convention (organized as the East Texas Musical Convention in 1855).

Singings are not restricted to members of an organization, but are communicated verbally at other singings, through social media and email lists, in unofficial public listings, and in Sacred Harp Singings: Minutes and Directory, published annually by the Sacred Harp Musical Heritage Association. "Minutes" of conventions and all-day singings are also kept as a record; recent minutes are published in this annual volume as well as online.

== History of Sacred Harp singing ==
Marini (2003) traces the earliest roots of Sacred Harp to the "country parish music" of early 18th century England. This form of rural church music evolved a number of the distinctive traits that were passed on from tradition to tradition, until they ultimately became part of Sacred Harp singing. These traits included the assignment of the melody to the tenors, harmonic structure emphasizing fourths and fifths, and the distinction between the ordinary four-part hymn ("plain tune"), the anthem, and the fuguing tune. Several composers of this school, including Joseph Stephenson and Aaron Williams, are represented in the 1991 Edition of The Sacred Harp. For further information on the English roots of Sacred Harp music, see West gallery music.

Around the mid-18th century, the forms and styles of English country parish music were introduced to America, notably in a new tunebook called Urania, published 1764 by the singing master James Lyon. This stimulus soon led to the development of a robust native school of composition, signaled by the 1770 publication of William Billings's The New England Psalm Singer, and then by a great number of new compositions by Billings and those who followed in his path. The work of these composers, sometimes called the "First New England School", forms a major part of the Sacred Harp to this day.

Billings and his followers worked as singing masters, who led singing schools. The purpose of these schools was to train young people in the correct singing of sacred music. This pedagogical movement flourished, and led ultimately to the invention of shape notes, which originated as a way to make the teaching of singing easier. The first shape note tunebook appeared in 1801: The Easy Instructor by William Smith and William Little. At first, Smith and Little's shapes competed with a rival system, created by Andrew Law (1749–1821) in his The Musical Primer of 1803. Although this book came out two years later than Smith and Little's book, Law claimed earlier invention of shape notes. In his system, a square indicated fa, a circle sol, a triangle la and a diamond, mi. Law used the shaped notes without a musical staff. The Smith and Little shapes ultimately prevailed.

Shape notes became very popular, and during the first part of the nineteenth century, a whole series of shape note tunebooks appeared, many of which were widely distributed. As the population spread west and south, the tradition of shape note singing expanded geographically. Composition flourished, with the new music often drawing on the tradition of folk song for tunes and inspiration. Probably the most successful shape note book prior to The Sacred Harp was William Walker's Southern Harmony, published in 1835 and still in use today.

Even as they flourished and spread, shape notes and the kind of participatory music which they served came under attack. The critics were from the urban-based "better music" movement, spearheaded by Lowell Mason, which advocated a more "scientific" style of sacred music, more closely based on the harmonic styles of contemporaneous European music. The new style gradually prevailed. Shape notes and their music disappeared from the cities prior to the Civil War, and from the rural areas of the Northeast and Midwest in the following decades. However, they retained a haven in the rural South, which remained a fertile territory for the creation of new shapenote publications.

=== The arrival of The Sacred Harp ===
Sacred Harp singing came into being with the 1844 publication of Benjamin Franklin White and Elisha J. King's The Sacred Harp. The editors of The Sacred Harp in the 19th century were Georgians; the book itself was typeset and printed in Philadelphia. It was this book, now distributed in several different versions, that came to be the shape-note tradition with the largest number of participants.

B. F. White (1800–1879) was originally from Union County, South Carolina, but since 1842 had been living in Harris County, Georgia. He prepared The Sacred Harp in collaboration with a younger man, E. J. King, (c. 1821–44), who was from Talbot County, Georgia. Together they compiled, transcribed, and composed tunes, and published a book of over 250 songs.

King died soon after the book was published, and White was left to guide its growth. He was responsible for organizing singing schools and conventions at which The Sacred Harp was used as the songbook. During his lifetime, the book became popular and would go through three revisions (1850, 1859, and 1869), all produced by committees consisting of White and several colleagues working under the auspices of the Southern Musical Convention. The first two new editions simply added appendices of new songs to the back of the book. The 1869 revision was more extensive, removing some of the less popular songs and adding new ones in their places. From the original 262 pages, the book was expanded by 1869 to 477. This edition was reprinted and continued in use for several decades.

=== Origin of the modern editions ===
Around the turn of the 20th century, Sacred Harp singing entered a period of conflict over the issue of traditionalism. The conflict ultimately split the community.

B. F. White had died in 1879 before completing a fourth revision of his book; thus the version that Sacred Harp participants were singing from was by the turn of the century over three decades old. During this time, the musical tastes of Sacred Harp's traditional adherents, the inhabitants of the rural South, had changed in important ways. Notably, gospel music – syncopated and chromatic, often with piano accompaniment – had become popular, along with a number of church hymns of the "mainstream" variety, such as "Rock of Ages". Seven-shape notation systems had appeared and won adherents away from the older four-shape system (see shape note for details). As time passed, Sacred Harp singers doubtless became aware that what they were singing had become quite distinct from contemporary tastes.

The natural path to take—and the one ultimately taken—would be to assert the archaic character of Sacred Harp as an outright virtue. In this view, Sacred Harp should be treasured as a time-tested musical tradition, standing above current trends of fashion. The difficulty with adopting traditionalism as a guiding doctrine was that different singers had different opinions about just what form the stable, traditionalized version of Sacred Harp would take.

The first move was made by W. M. Cooper, of Dothan, Alabama, a leading Sacred Harp teacher in his own region, but not part of the inner circle of B. F. White's old colleagues and descendants. In 1902 Cooper prepared a revision of The Sacred Harp that, while retaining most of the old songs, also added new tunes that reflected more contemporary music styles. Cooper made other changes, too:

- He retitled many old songs. These songs were formerly named by their tune, using arbitrarily chosen place names ("New Britain", "Northfield", "Charlestown"). The new names were based on the text; thus "New Britain" became "Amazing Grace", "Northfield" became "How Long, Dear Savior", and so on. The old system was intended in colonial times to permit mixing and matching of tunes and texts, but was unnecessary in a system where the pairing of tune and text was fixed.
- He transposed some songs into new keys. This is thought to have brought the notation closer to actual performing practice.
- He wrote new alto parts for the many songs that originally just had three vocal lines.

The Cooper revision was a success, being widely adopted in many areas of the South, such as Florida, southern Alabama, and Texas, where it has continued as the predominant Sacred Harp book to this day. The "Cooper book", as it is now often called, was revised by Cooper himself in 1907 and 1909. His son-in-law published the book in 1927, including an appendix compiled by revision committee. The Sacred Harp Book Company was formed in 1949, and subsequent revision has been supervised by editorial committees under its instruction. New editions were issued in 1950, 1960, 1992, 2000, 2006 and 2012.

In the original core geographic area of Sacred Harp singing, northern Alabama and Georgia, the singers did not in general take to the Cooper book, as they felt it deviated too far from the original tradition. Obtaining a new book for these singers was made more difficult by the fact that B. F. White's son James L. White, who would have been the natural choice to prepare a new edition, was a non-traditionalist. His "fifth edition" (1909) won little support among singers, while his "fourth edition with supplement" (1911) enjoyed some success in a few areas. Ultimately, a committee headed by Joseph Stephen James produced an edition entitled Original Sacred Harp (1911) that largely satisfied the wishes of this community of singers.

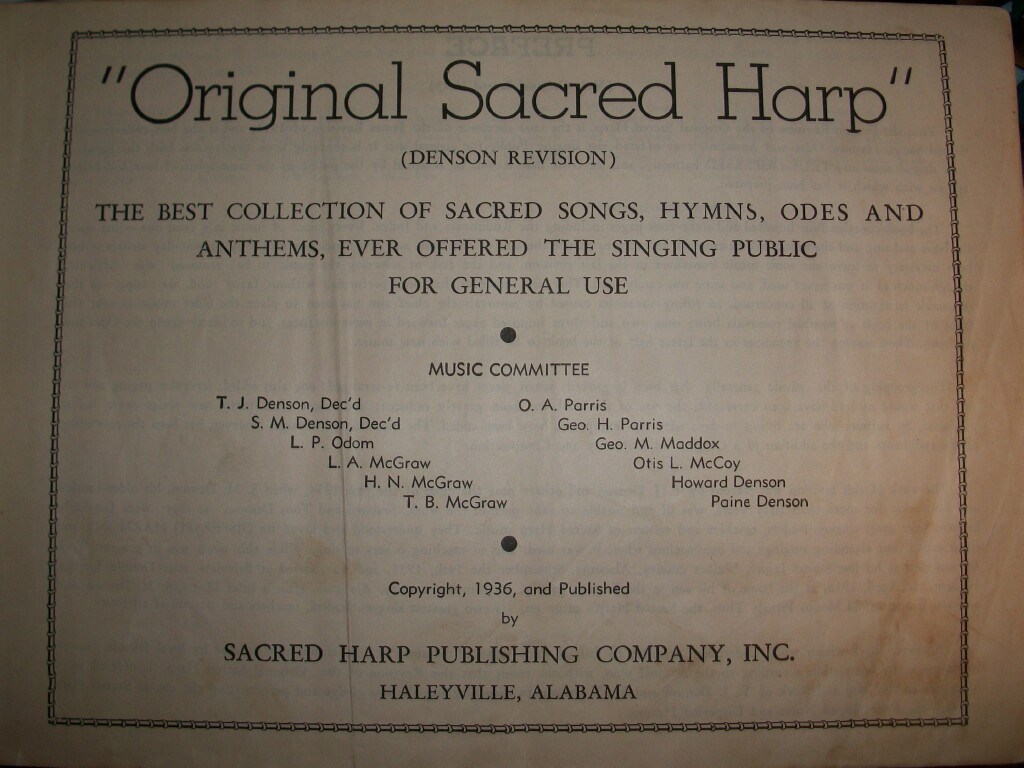
"Original Sacred Harp (Denson Revision)"

The James edition was further revised in 1936 by a committee under the leadership of the brothers Seaborn and Thomas Denson, both influential singing school teachers. Both died shortly before the project was complete, and the remaining work was overseen by Paine Denson, son of Thomas. This book was entitled Original Sacred Harp, Denson Revision, and was itself revised 1960, 1967, and 1971 by committees led by A. M. Cagle and Hugh McGraw. Additional, more thorough revisions and remodelings of this book, overseen by McGraw and David Ivey, respectively, were published in 1991 and 2025. Today, the book is known as the "2025 Edition", though some singers still call it the "Denson book".

Even the highly traditionalist James and Denson books followed Cooper in adding alto parts to most of the old three-part songs (these alto parts led to an unsuccessful lawsuit by Cooper). Some people (see for instance the reference by Buell Cobb given below) believe that the new alto parts imposed an esthetic cost by filling in the former stark open harmonies of the three-part songs. Wallace McKenzie argues to the contrary, basing his view on a systematic study of representative songs. In any event, there is little support today for abandoning the added alto parts, since most singers give a high priority to giving every side of the square its own part to sing.

It was thus that the traditionalism debate split the Sacred Harp community, and there seems little prospect that it will ever reunite under a single book. However, there have been no further splits. Both the Denson and the Cooper groups adopted traditionalist views for the particular form of Sacred Harp they favored, and these forms have now been stable for about a century.

The strength of traditionalism can be seen in the front matter of the two hymnbooks. The Denson book is forthrightly Biblical in its defense of tradition:

DEDICATED TO
All lovers of Sacred Harp Music, and to the memory of the illustrious and venerable patriarchs who established the Traditional Style of Sacred Harp singing and admonished their followers to "seek the old paths and walk therein".

The Cooper book also shows a warm appreciation of tradition:

May God bless everyone as we endeavor to promote and enjoy Sacred Harp music and to continue the rich tradition of those who have gone before us.

To say that both communities are traditionalist does not mean they discourage the creation of new songs. To the contrary, it is part of the tradition that musically creative Sacred Harp singers should become composers themselves and add to the canon. The new compositions are prepared in traditional styles, and could be considered a kind of tribute to the older material. New songs have been incorporated into editions of The Sacred Harp throughout the 20th century and into the 21st.

=== Other Sacred Harp books ===
Two other books are currently used by Sacred Harp singers. Some singers in north Georgia, as well as north Mississippi, employ the "White book", an expanded version of the 1869 B. F. White edition edited by J. L. White. African-American Sacred Harp singers, although primarily users of the Cooper book, also make use of a supplementary volume, The Colored Sacred Harp, produced by Judge Jackson (1883–1958) in 1934 and later revised in two subsequent editions. In his book Judge Jackson and The Colored Sacred Harp, Joe Dan Boyd identified four regions of Sacred Harp singing among African-Americans: eastern Texas (Cooper book), northern Mississippi (Denson book), south Alabama and Florida (Cooper book), and New Jersey (Cooper book). The Colored Sacred Harp is limited to the New Jersey and south Alabama–Florida groups. Sacred Harp was "exported" from south Alabama to New Jersey. Sacred Harp appears to have died out among the African-Americans in eastern Texas. They used the Cooper Book, but never used the book by Judge Jackson.

=== The spread of Sacred Harp singing in modern times ===
Beginning in the mid-20th century, Sacred Harp singing grew in popularity with participants who did not grow up in the tradition, including singers outside Georgia, Alabama, Mississippi and Texas. New singers typically strive to follow the historically Southern customs at their singings; traditional singers have responded to this need by providing help in orienting the newcomers. For instance, the Rudiments section of the 1991 Denson edition includes information on how to hold a singing; this information would be superfluous in a traditional context, but is important for a group starting up on its own. In recent years an annual summer camp has been established, at which newcomers can learn to sing Sacred Harp.

==== The U.S. beyond the South ====
There are now strong Sacred Harp singing communities in most major urban areas of the United States, and in many rural areas, as well. One of the first groups of singers formed outside the traditional Southern home region of Sacred Harp singing was in the Chicago area. The first Illinois convention was held in 1985, with enthusiastic and strongly proactive support by prominent Southern traditional singers. The Midwest Convention is now acknowledged to be one of the major American conventions, attracting hundreds of singers from all over the US and abroad. Similarly, the Sacred Harp singing community in western New England has become a prominent one in recent years; the late songleader Larry Gordon has been credited with re-popularizing Sacred Harp singing in northern New England. In March 2008, the 2008 Western Massachusetts Sacred Harp Convention attracted over 300 singers from 25 states and a number of foreign countries. Other prominent singing conventions outside the South include, for example, the Keystone Convention in Pennsylvania, the Missouri Convention, and the Minnesota State Convention, which began in 1990.

==== Sacred Harp Singing beyond the US ====
In more recent times Sacred Harp singing has spread beyond the borders of the United States.

===== United Kingdom =====
The United Kingdom has had an active Sacred Harp community since the 1990s. The first UK Sacred Harp convention took place in 1996. There are active regular local singings and all-day singings in many places around the UK.

===== Canada =====
Canada has a decades-long tradition of Sacred Harp singing, particularly in Southern Ontario and the Eastern Townships of Quebec. Singings have been organized weekly in Montreal, Quebec since 2011, as well as a monthly afternoon sing, and the first Montreal all-day sing took place in the spring of 2016. Sacred Harp singing has happened on a monthly basis for years in Toronto.

===== Australia =====
Australia has had Sacred Harp singing since 2001, and singings are held regularly in Melbourne, Sydney, Canberra and Blackwood. The first Australian All Day Singing was held in Sydney in 2012.

===== Ireland =====
In January 2009, Sacred Harp singing was introduced to Ireland, by Juniper Hill of University College Cork, spreading quickly from a class module into the wider community. In March 2011 U.C.C. hosted the first annual Ireland Sacred Harp Convention, and the Cork community held their first All-Day Singing on 22 October 2011. There are now also growing Sacred Harp communities in Belfast and Dublin.

===== Continental Europe =====
In the most recent development, Sacred Harp singing has expanded beyond the limits of English-speaking countries to mainland Europe. In 2008 a singing community was established in Poland (which hosted the first Camp Fasola Europe in September 2012). In Germany there are regular weekly or monthly singings in Bremen, Hamburg, Berlin, Cologne and Munich, most of them with their own annual All-Day singings. Elsewhere in Germany, singers meet irregularly in Frankfurt, Gießen and Nürnberg. Recently groups have started up in Amsterdam, Paris and Clermont-Ferrand, Oslo, Norway, and Uppsala, Sweden. Both the Swedish and Norwegian groups have arranged all-day singings; the 10th Oslo All-Day Singing will be June 2026, 5.- 7.

Regular singings also take place in Israel, and in April 2016, an all-day singing was held in Paris, France.

=== Use in popular works ===
Sacred Harp singing appears as diegetic music in the films Cold Mountain (2004) and Lawless (2012), and as background music in The Ladykillers (2004).

The 2010 song "Tell Me Why" by M.I.A. includes a sample of "The Last Words of Copernicus" by Sarah Lancaster, recorded at the 1959 United Sacred Harp Convention in Fyffe, Alabama, by Alan Lomax. The album version of Bruce Springsteen's "Death to My Hometown" (2012) also samples this recording.

Electronic musician Holly Herndon's 2019 track "Frontier" includes a performance of Herndon's music by a singing class in Berlin, Germany.

The 2014 animated miniseries Over the Garden Wall features an original shape-note style composition in the second episode, "Hard Times at the Huskin' Bee".

Laurie Anderson's 2024 multimedia show United States V included a performance of "David's Lamentation" (Sacred Harp 268) by a rotating group of UK Sacred Harp singers.

== Origins of the music ==
The music used in Sacred Harp singing is eclectic. Most of the songs can be assigned to one of four historical layers.

1. The oldest of these layers comes from 18th century New England, and represents a rendition in shape notes of the work of outstanding early American composers such as William Billings and Daniel Read, who worked as singing masters.
2. A second layer comes from the decades around 1830, following the migration of the shape note tradition to the rural South. Many of the songs in this layer are believed to be originally secular folk tunes, harmonized in parts and given religious lyrics. As one would expect from the folk origin of such music, it often emphasizes the notes of the pentatonic scale. They often employ stark, vivid harmonies based on open fifths. Most of the songs of this layer were originally composed in just three parts (treble, tenor, bass), with the altos added later, as noted above. The sound of this musical layer, as well as to some extent The Sacred Harp in general, can be observed by comparing versions of the well-known hymn "Amazing Grace", which is familiar to many Americans in a form such as the following:
  In The Sacred Harp: 2025 Edition, "Amazing Grace" is harmonized quite differently. Note that the "air", or melody, is in the tenor.
3. A third layer of Sacred Harp music is from the mid nineteenth century and represents the popular sensibility of that era. A number of these mid-century works have an almost primal simplicity—the harmony is essentially a single extended major chord, and the parts a decoration in slow tempo of that chord.
4. The most recent layer consists of the songs that were added to the books during the twentieth and twenty-first centuries. These are the work of musically creative participants in the Sacred Harp tradition, who strove to create songs that would fit into the existing tradition by adopting the style of one of the earlier periods. New compositions represented 38 of the 60 songs added to the 1991 Edition, and the 2025 Edition added a further 81 songs by living composers. Contemporary composers rarely write their own lyrics, but tend to prefer texts of the same period as, or indeed shared by, earlier Sacred Harp songs (e.g. the 18th-century hymnodist Isaac Watts, whose lyrics account for more than 120 Sacred Harp songs added across various editions.) A number of these modern compositions have become favorites of the singing community, such as 475 A Thankful Heart, added in the 1991 Edition, which over the course of that edition's lifetime was the fourth-most-sung song at minuted singings.

There are a few additional songs in The Sacred Harp: 2025 Edition that cannot be assigned to any of these four main layers. There are some very old songs of European origin (e.g. the shapenote setting of Old Hundred, 49t), as well as songs from the English rural tradition that inspired the early New England composers. There are also a handful of songs by European classical composers (Ignaz Pleyel, Thomas Arne, and Henry Rowley Bishop). The book even includes five hymns by Lowell Mason, long ago the implacable enemy of the tradition that The Sacred Harp has preserved to this day.

The description just given is based on the 1991 and 2025 Editions of The Sacred Harp, also known as the Denson edition. The widely used 2012 "Cooper" edition overlaps considerably in content with the 1991 Edition, but also includes many songs composed after that date. A detailed comparison of the two editions has been made by Sacred Harp scholar Gaylon L. Powell.

== Other books with the title Sacred Harp ==
The Sacred Harp was a popular name for 19th century hymn and tune books, with no fewer than four bearing the title. The first of these was compiled by John Hoyt Hickok and printed in Lewistown, Pennsylvania in 1832. The second was compiled by Lowell and Timothy Mason and printed in Cincinnati, Ohio in 1834, as part of the "better music" movement mentioned above. The publisher released their book as a shape note edition, while they preferred to urbanize their audience by releasing a round note edition.

The third Sacred Harp was the one by B. F. White and E. J. King (1844), the origin of today's Sacred Harp singing tradition.

Lastly, according to W. J. Reynolds, writing in Hymns of Our Faith, there was yet a fourth Sacred Harp – The Sacred Harp published by J. M. D. Cates in Nashville, Tennessee in 1867.

== See also ==
- Awake, My Soul: The Story of the Sacred Harp
- Chattahoochee Musical Convention
- East Texas Musical Convention
- List of shape-note tunebooks
- Sacred Harp hymnwriters and composers
- Shape note
- Southwest Texas Sacred Harp Singing Convention

== Notes ==
=== Sources ===
- Anon. (1940) Georgia: A guide to its towns and countryside. Compiled and written by workers of the Writers' Program of the Works Progress Administration. University of Georgia Press.
- Bealle, John (1997). Public Worship, Private Faith: Sacred Harp and American Folksong. University of Georgia Press. ISBN 0-8203-1988-0.
- Clawson, Laura (15 September 2011). I Belong to This Band, Hallelujah!: Community, Spirituality, and Tradition Among Sacred Harp Singers. University of Chicago Press. ISBN 978-0-226-10959-6.
- Cobb, Buell E. (1989) [1978]. The Sacred Harp: A Tradition and Its Music. University of Georgia Press. ISBN 0-8203-2371-3.
- Gould, Nathaniel Duren (1853). History of Church Music in America. Gould and Lincoln. p. 55.
- Horn, Dorothy D. (1970). Sing to me of Heaven: A Study of Folk and Early American Materials in Three Old Harp Books. University of Florida Press.
- Marini, Stephen A. (2003). Sacred Song in America: Religion, Music, and Public Culture. University of Illinois Press. See chapter 3, "Sacred Harp singing".
- McKenzie, Wallace (1989). "The Alto Parts in the 'True Dispersed Harmony' of The Sacred Harp Revisions". The Musical Quarterly. 73 (73): 153–171. doi:10.1093/mq/73.2.153.
- Miller, Kiri (Winter 2004). "'First Sing the Notes': Oral and Written Traditions in Sacred Harp Transmission". American Music. 22 (4): 475–501. doi:10.2307/3592990. JSTOR 3592990.
- Temperley, Nicholas (1983). The Music of the English Parish Church. Cambridge University Press. ISBN 978-0-521-27457-9.
