= Landrum =

Landrum can refer to:

People

- Bill Landrum (born 1957), American baseball player
- Dan Landrum (born 1961), American hammered dulcimer player
- Eugene M. Landrum (1891–1967), major general in the United States Army, noted for his exploits in both World War II and the Korean War
- John Gill Landrum (1810–1882), pastor at Mount Zion Baptist Church, early South Carolina secessionist
- John M. Landrum, (1815-1861) United States Representative
- Mary Beth Landrum, British-American statistician
- Phil Landrum (1907–1990), United States Representative and a primary sponsor of the Landrum-Griffin Act
- Rich Landrum (born 1946), American broadcaster best known for his late 1970s-early 1980s stint announcing professional wrestling for Jim Crockett Promotions
- Teddy Joseph Von Nukem (born Ted Landrum, 1987–2023), American white nationalist and far-right extremist
- Landrum Bolling (1913-2018), American diplomat and educator

Places

- Landrum, South Carolina, a city in Spartanburg County

Other

- The Labor Management Reporting and Disclosure Act, also known as the Landrum-Griffin Act, a United States labor law passed by the Congress in 1959
