= What Wondrous Love Is This =

1811 American Christian folk hymn

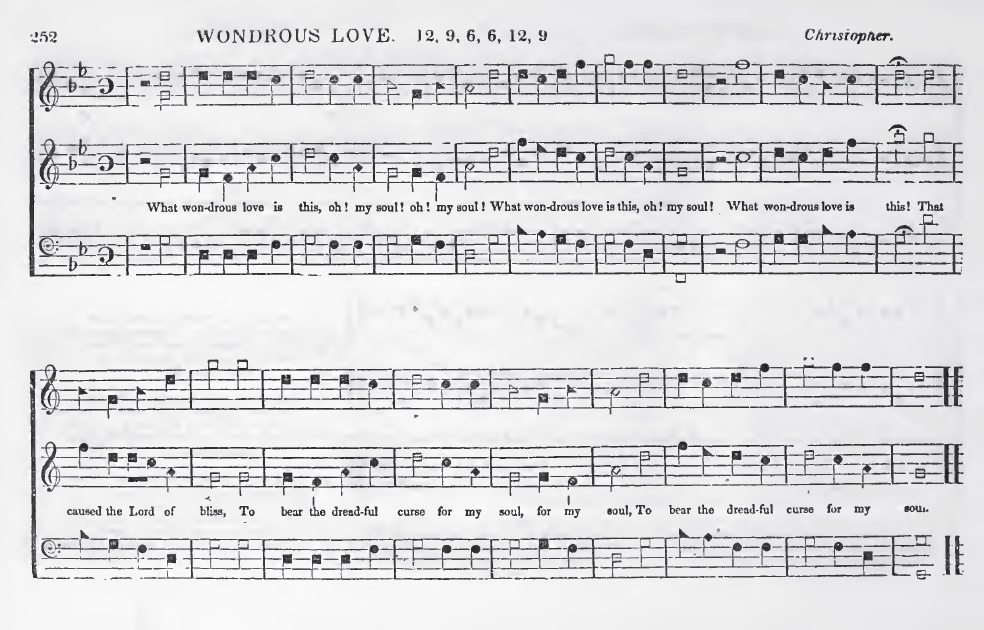
Shape note sheet music for "What Wondrous Love Is This" in the 1854 edition of The Southern Harmony. The melody is in the middle staff.

"What Wondrous Love Is This" (often just referred to as "Wondrous Love") is a Christian folk hymn from the American South. Its text was first published in 1811, during the Second Great Awakening, and its melody derived from a popular English ballad (Roud number 5089). Today it is a widely known hymn included in hymnals of many Christian denominations.

== Origins ==
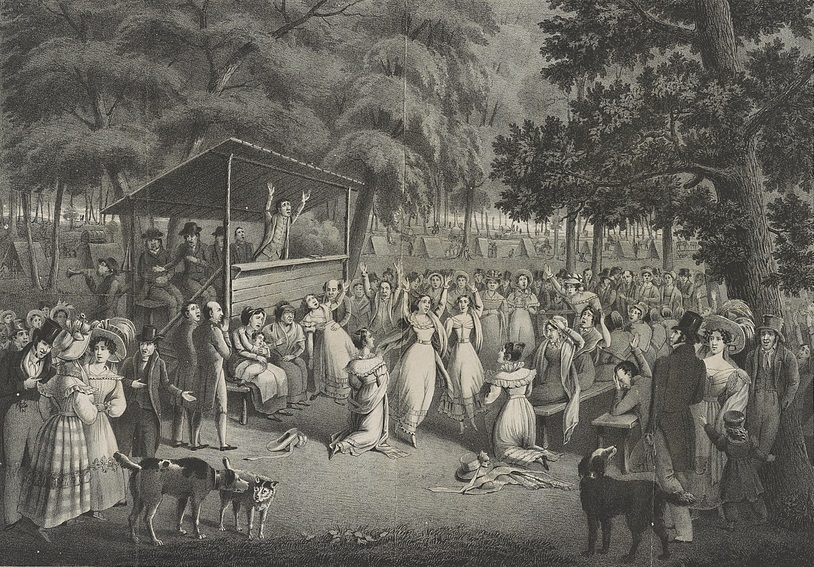
Camp meeting during the Second Great Awakening

The hymn's lyrics were first published in Lynchburg, Virginia in the c. 1811 camp meeting songbook A General Selection of the Newest and Most Admired Hymns and Spiritual Songs Now in Use. The lyrics may also have been printed, in a slightly different form, in the 1811 book Hymns and Spiritual Songs, Original and Selected published in Lexington, Kentucky. (It was included in the third edition of this text published in 1818, but all copies of the first edition have been lost.) In most early printings, the hymn's text was attributed to an anonymous author, though the 1848 hymnal The Hesperian Harp attributes the text to a Methodist pastor from Oxford, Georgia named Alexander Means.

Most sources attribute the hymn's melody to the 1701 English song "The Ballad of Captain Kidd", which describes the exploits of pirate William Kidd (misnamed "Robert" in American versions of the ballad). (Note: Some sources dispute this linkage, regarding the metric similarities between the songs as coincidental.) The melody itself predates the Kidd usage, however, possibly by more than a century. (In addition, at least a dozen popular songs were set to the same melody after 1701.) In the early 1800s, when the lyrics to "What Wondrous Love Is This" were first published, hymnals typically lacked any musical notation. Camp meeting attendees during the Second Great Awakening would sing the hymns printed in these hymnals to a variety of popular melodies, including "The Ballad of Captain Kidd", which was well known at the time; this is likely how the text and melody came to be paired. The text and melody were first published together in the appendix of the 1840 edition of The Southern Harmony, a book of shape note hymns compiled by William Walker. The three-part harmony printed in The Southern Harmony was arranged by James Christopher of Spartanburg, South Carolina. In a later printing of the hymn, William Walker noted that it was a "very popular old Southern tune". It was included in the original 1844 edition of The Sacred Harp, now the best-known and most-used shapenote hymnal, and has remained in every edition since.

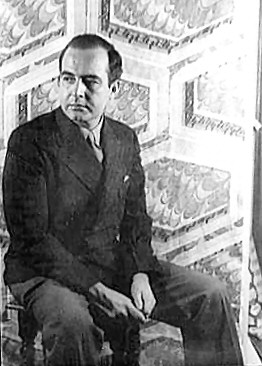
American composer Samuel Barber composed variations on "What Wondrous Love Is This" in 1958.

== Later use ==
In 1952, American composer and musicologist Charles F. Bryan included "What Wondrous Love Is This" in his folk opera Singin' Billy.

In 1954, Pete Seeger included it as "Wondrous Love" on the album Frontier Ballads, along with another hymn of similar vintage, "The Wayfaring Stranger".

In 1958, American composer Samuel Barber composed Wondrous Love: Variations on a Shape Note Hymn (Op. 34), a work for organ, for Christ Episcopal Church in Grosse Pointe, Michigan; the church's organist, an associate of Barber's, had requested a piece for the dedication ceremony of the church's new organ. The piece begins with a statement that closely follows the traditional hymn; four variations follow, of which the last is the "longest and most expressive".

Norman Blake accelerated the first six notes of "What Wondrous Love Is This" (the notes of that title's five words) and three repetitions of them as the intro of his 1972 or 1973 bluegrass reel “Coming Down from Rising Fawn.”

Dwayne S. Milburn composed a prelude on Wondrous Love as the first movement of his "American Hymnsong Suite" (2003) for concert band.

In 1966, the United Methodist Book of Hymns became the first standard hymnal to incorporate What Wondrous Love Is This. What Wondrous Love Is This is now a widely known hymn and is included in many major hymnals, including the Baptist Hymnal, Book of Praise (Presbyterian), Chalice Hymnal (Christian Church (Disciples of Christ)), Common Praise (Anglican), The Hymnal 1982 (Episcopalian), Lutheran Book of Worship, New Century Hymnal (United Church of Christ), Presbyterian Hymnal, Voices United (United Church of Canada), The Worshipping Church (interdenominational), Worship (Roman Catholic), and Singing the Living Tradition (Unitarian Universalism), and A New Hymnal for Colleges and Schools (interdenominational). The Unitarian Universalist hymnal replaces the original lyrics with words by Connie Campbell Hart to better reflect the denomination's theology. In addition, the Secular Hymnal replaces the original lyrics with new secular words by Secretary Michael. In 2003, the group Blue Highway, sing this and recorded this in a new version, included in the album "Wondrous Love".

Folk singer Melanie also gave a well loved secular interpretation of the song on her album "Gather Me" in 1971.

In 2023, the song was performed by the Atlanta Symphony Orchestra Chamber Chorus during the memorial service for Rosalynn Carter.

== Music and lyrics ==
What Wondrous Love Is This
What Wondrous Love Is This, as performed by Joshua Messick. There is a twelve-second introduction before the first verse of the hymn begins.

The hymn is sung in Dorian mode, giving it a haunting quality. Though The Southern Harmony and many later hymnals incorrectly notated the song in Aeolian mode (natural minor), even congregations singing from these hymnals generally sang in Dorian mode by spontaneously raising the sixth note a half step wherever it appeared. Twentieth-century hymnals generally present the hymn in Dorian mode, or sometimes in Aeolian mode but with a raised sixth. The hymn has an unusual meter of 6-6-6-3-6-6-6-6-6-3.

The song's lyrics express awe at the love of God and are reminiscent of the text of John 3:16. The following lyrics are those printed in the 1811 hymnal A General Selection of the Newest and Most Admired Hymns and Spiritual Songs Now in Use; a number of variations exist, but most are descended from this version.

1.
What wondrous love is this,
O my soul! O my soul!
What wondrous love is this!
O my soul!
What wondrous love is this!
That caused the Lord of bliss!
To send this precious peace,
To my soul, to my soul!
To send this precious peace
To my soul!

2.
When I was sinking down,
Sinking down, sinking down;
When I was sinking down
Sinking down
When I was sinking down,
Beneath God's righteous frown,
Christ laid aside his crown
For my soul, for my soul!
Christ laid aside his crown
For my soul!

3.
Ye winged seraphs fly,
Bear the news, bear the news!
Ye winged seraphs fly
Bear the news!--
Ye winged seraphs fly,
like comets through the sky,
fill vast eternity!
With the news, with the news!
Fill vast eternity
With the news!

4.
Ye friends of Zion's king,
join his praise, join his praise;
Ye friends of Zion's king,
join his praise;
Ye friends of Zion's king,
with hearts and voices sing,
and strike each tuneful string
in his praise, in his praise!
and strike each tuneful string
in his praise!

5.
To God and to the Lamb,
I will sing, I will sing;
To God and to the Lamb,
I will sing--
To God and to the Lamb,
who is the great I AM,
while millions join the theme,
I will sing, I will sing!
while millions join the theme,
I will sing!

6.
And while from death I'm free,
I'll sing on, I'll sing on,
And while from death I'm free,
I'll sing on.
and while from death I'm free,
I'll sing and joyful be,
and through eternity
I'll sing on, I'll sing on,
and through eternity
I'll sing on.
