= Come Thou Fount of Every Blessing =

18th-century Christian hymn

- Hymn no
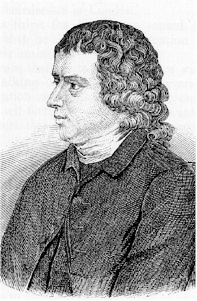
- Written: 1758
- Text: by Robert Robinson
- Meter: 8.7.8.7
- Melody: "Nettleton" by John Wyeth

"Come Thou Fount of Every Blessing" is a Christian hymn written by the Baptist pastor and hymnodist Robert Robinson, who penned the words in 1757 at age 22. Later in life, he wandered from his faith. A young woman used this hymn to encourage him to return to the Lord.

Come, Thou Fount of every blessing,
Tune my heart to sing Thy grace;
Streams of mercy, never ceasing,
Call for songs of loudest praise.
Teach me some melodious sonnet,
Sung by flaming tongues above.
Praise the mount, I’m fixed upon it,
Mount of Thy redeeming love.

Sorrowing I shall be in spirit,
Till released from flesh and sin,
Yet from what I do inherit,
Here Thy praises I'll begin;
Here I raise my Ebenezer;
Here by Thy great help I’ve come;
And I hope, by Thy good pleasure,
Safely to arrive at home.

Jesus sought me when a stranger,
Wandering from the fold of God;
He, to rescue me from danger,
Interposed His precious blood;
How His kindness yet pursues me
Mortal tongue can never tell,
Clothed in flesh, till death shall loose me
I cannot proclaim it well.

O to grace how great a debtor
Daily I’m constrained to be!
Let Thy goodness, like a fetter,
Bind my wandering heart to Thee.
Prone to wander, Lord, I feel it,
Prone to leave the God I love;
Here’s my heart, O take and seal it,
Seal it for Thy courts above.

O that day when freed from sinning,
I shall see Thy lovely face;
Clothèd then in blood washed linen
How I’ll sing Thy sovereign grace;
Come, my Lord, no longer tarry,
Take my ransomed soul away;
Send thine angels now to carry
Me to realms of endless day.

The original text of the hymn "Come Thou Fount of Every Blessing"

== Tunes ==
"Come Thou Fount of Every Blessing" set to the tune "Nettleton"

In the United States, the hymn is usually set to an American folk tune known as "Nettleton", which first appears in Wyeth's Repository of Sacred Music, Part Second (1813), possibly collected by Elkanah Kelsey Dare, who was the musical editor (John Wyeth himself was a printer). The tune appears on page 112 in F major for two voices (tenor and bass), with a revival chorus (Hallelujah, Hallelujah, we are on our journey home); the facing page has another musical setting ("Concert") in A minor without any chorus. Asahel Nettleton also published music, so some attribute his namesake tune directly to him. In the United Kingdom, the hymn is also often set to the tune "Normandy" by C Bost. The "Nettleton" tune is used extensively in partial or full quotation by the American composer Charles Ives, in such works as the First String Quartet and the piano quintet and song "The Innate". The "Nettleton" tune is also quoted at the end of "My Trundle Bed" by Tullius C. O'Kane.

In the shape note tradition, most tunebooks have one or more tunes other than "Nettleton" that use Robinson's lyrics, in part, or in whole, often adding a camp meeting-style revival chorus between each verse. Because most singers have the lyrics memorized, it can be sung at remarkably fast tempos without stumbling over the words. For example, the tune "Warrenton," which first appeared in the 1838 edition of William Walker's Southern Harmony, is sung in 4/4 time or 2/2 cut time; to fit the text to this melody, the second half of each verse is omitted and replaced with a chorus of "I am bound for the kingdom, will you come to glory with me? / Hallelujah, praise the Lord!"

== Text ==
The lyrics, which dwell on the theme of divine grace, are based on 1 Samuel 7:12, in which the prophet Samuel raises a stone as a monument, saying, "Hitherto hath the Lord helped us" (KJV). Samuel names the stone Ebenezer, meaning Stone of Help. The unusual word Ebenezer commonly appears in hymnal presentations of the lyrics (verse 2).

Various revised versions appear in hymnals, often changing phrases or replacing the reference to Ebenezer. The version in Nazarene hymnals and those of the Holiness movement replaces "wandering" with "yielded," and "prone to wander" with "let me know Thee in Thy fullness". Many choirs, including the Tabernacle Choir at Temple Square, sing it in an arrangement by Mack Wilberg. It splits verse 2 into two parts and the last half of verse 3 is appended to each part to form two verses. A version titled "O Thou Fount of Every Blessing" and attributed to Robert Robinson is found in several shape-note hymnals of the American South. The melody is attributed to A. Nettleton, while several phrases are changed.

== Recordings ==
- Mosquito Fleet- arrangement, instrumentation and vocals by Mosquito Fleet- Swings & Cloves EP in 2001.
- Catholic artist Audrey Assad recorded a version of this hymn on her "Good to Me" EP in 2013.
- Nancy Bryan sings a version of this hymn on her album Neon Angel from 2000.
- Christian artist Fernando Ortega recorded a version on his album Hymns & Meditations in 1994
- It has been covered by the David Crowder Band on their 1999 album All I Can Say.
- Christian rock band Jars of Clay and veteran Christian artist Scott Wesley Brown have also covered the song.
- Scottish group Celtic Worship recorded a version incorporating traditional Scottish instruments, on their album Morningtide.
- Sufjan Stevens recorded a version for his Hark! Songs for Christmas album, which reached 122 in the US charts and is featured in the closing minutes of the season four premiere episode of Friday Night Lights.
- Gateway Worship performed the song on their album Living for You and added a chorus to the song, calling it "Come Thou Fount, Come Thou King".
- The hymn appears on Phil Wickham's album 'Sing-A-Long'.
- This song is also sung by Clark Davis in the film Love Comes Softly and is a recurring background music in the film.
- Mumford & Sons have covered it in a small number of their live shows.
- Leigh Nash has covered it in Hymns and Sacred Songs.
- Additionally, The Mormon Tabernacle Choir recorded this hymn as part of their album titled The Sound of Glory, and frequently sing it in their live performances. This arrangement was written by Mack Wilberg, now director of The Tabernacle Choir at Temple Square, while working as the director of the BYU Men's Chorus. The arrangement first appeared on the album A Thanksgiving of American Folk Hymns, featuring the BYU Combined Choirs and Orchestra, released in 1993.
- Christian punk pop band Eleventyseven covered the hymn in their Good Spells EP.
- Gospel recording artist Anthony Brown and group therAPy covered the first verse of the hymn in the song "Without You" on their sophomore album Everyday Jesus.
- Pop musician Adam Young posted his version on his SoundCloud page.
- Christian band MercyMe recorded the song on their album The Worship Sessions.
- Indie rock band Kings Kaleidoscope covered the hymn in their first EP, Asaph's Arrows.
- Christian hymnwriters Enfield covered this hymn with adjustments to several stanzas and phrases for doctrinal purposes. The track is found on their 2011 release: Resolved Music: Vol. II
- Johnnie Vinson arranged an instrumental piece based on this song featuring both a trumpet and an oboe solo
- Chris Tomlin covered the song under the title Come Thou Fount (I Will Sing) for his 2016 album Never Lose Sight.
- Pastor and producer Billy Wiginton recorded a version incorporating modern pop and hip hop elements, and released it as a single in 2019.
- A variation covered by Shane & Shane on their 2016 album Hymns, Vol. 1. called Come Thou Fount (Above All Else). The song incorporates (Above All Else) upon the end of the traditional hymn.
- Covered in medley by ElenyiMusic, released Jan 2016.
- Hip-hop musician Forrest Frank recorded a version incorporating modern pop and hip-hop elements, and released it as part of his album titled New Hymns.
