= John Landrum =

John Landrum may refer to:

- John M. Landrum, U.S. Representative from Louisiana
- John Gill Landrum, Baptist pastor and namesake of Landrum, South Carolina
