= Cross Keys, Virginia =

Cross Keys
- Unincorporated community
- Location in Virginia Cross Keys (the United States)
- Coordinates: 38°21′27″N 78°50′46″W
- Country: United States
- State: Virginia
- County: Rockingham County

Cross Keys is an unincorporated community located in Rockingham County, in the U.S. state of Virginia.

== Geography ==
The community is located on State Route 276, south of Harrisonburg.

Location of Cross Keys within the Rockingham County

== History ==
On June 8, 1862, it was the site of the Battle of Cross Keys, a Confederate victory in Jackson's Valley Campaign during the American Civil War.

== Climate ==
The climate in this area is characterized by hot, humid summers and generally mild to cool winters. According to the Köppen Climate Classification system, Cross Keys has a humid subtropical climate, abbreviated "Cfa" on climate maps.

== Culture ==
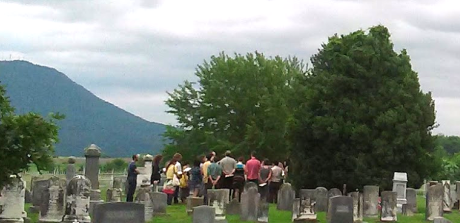
Singers gather around the grave of Ananias Davisson in Cross Keys, following an all-day shape note singing.

Ananias Davisson, the publisher of the first Southern shape note tunebook, the Kentucky Harmony (1816), is buried in the Cross Keys cemetery. Davisson was from the Shenandoah Valley, but many of the songs were collected during trips to Kentucky and Tennessee. Many of his musical compositions have been republished in the Shenandoah Harmony, and the annual Northern Shenandoah Valley All Day Shenandoah Harmony Singing typically ends with a visit by singers to the Cross Keys cemetery, where they sing Ananias Davisson's "Retirement" at the graveside of the composer.
