= Southern Harmony (Duckworth) =

Choral composition by William Duckworth

Southern Harmony is a minimalist composition by William Duckworth written in 1980 and 1981. It is scored for unaccompanied mixed chorus, and is an original work created through adaptation of shape-note songs from the 1854 compilation Southern Harmony and Musical Companion (first published 1835). Southern Harmony is divided into four books (or sections) that were premiered over the span of a decade. The complete work was premiered in February 1992 at Merkin Concert Hall in New York by the Gregg Smith Singers.

== Movements ==
The individual movements of Southern Harmony are:

=== Book One ===
1. Consolation
2. Wondrous Love
3. Hebrew Children
4. Solemn Thought
5. Rock of Ages

=== Book Two ===
6. Cheerful
7. War Department
8. Condescension
9. Holy Manna
10. Bozrah

=== Book Three ===
11. The Mouldering Vine
12. Mear
13. Leander
14. Sardina
15. Windham

=== Book Four ===
16. Distress
17. Nashville
18. Turtle Dove
19. Primrose
20. Social Band
