= Matilda T. Durham =

American composer and hymn writer (1815–1901)

A major-key version of "Promised Land", used as a congregational hymn

Matilda T. Durham, later Hoy (January 17, 1815 – July 30, 1901) was an American composer and hymn tune writer. She is remembered for her shape note tune "Promised Land", first published in 1835.

== Biography ==
A native of Spartanburg County, South Carolina, Durham was the daughter of George Durham and Susan Hyde Durham. Her grandfather, John Durham, had settled near Switzer in Spartanburg County, South Carolina, before 1800, and he and his wife Mary were among the first members of Green Pond Baptist Church. "Grand Sir Durham", as John Durham was known, was ordained as a deacon when Durham was nine years old.

Durham married Andrew Coan Hoy (1819–1890) in 1843; the ceremony was conducted by John Gill Landrum, who like her was a contributor to William Walker's Southern Harmony. She worked as a singing teacher, and in addition produced Baptist articles and tracts; these, though serious, displayed traces of wit as well. Durham married Hoy in Cobb County, Georgia on 19 October 1843. According to some accounts the Hoys moved to Cobb County after the American Civil War. However, both were received into membership of Noonday Baptist Church in Cobb County in February 1851, and Mr. Hoy was elected clerk of that church in March 1856. Durham died in Cobb County and was buried in the Fowler-Hoy family cemetery. She had outlived her husband by nearly eleven years.

It has been posited that Durham was personally acquainted with Walker, who moved to the Spartanburg area around 1830; between 1835 and 1846 she contributed several tunes to his books. Besides "Promised Land", she is known for "Heavenly Treasure", "Star of Columbia", "Heavenly Treasures", "Vale of Sorrow", and "Jordan". She is often credited as "Miss M. T. Durham" or "M. Durham". Her talents as a composer and writer were once recorded as having been noted in her epitaph.

== Promised Land ==
"Promised Land", since its publication as "The Promised Land" in 1835 and later, has been converted to a major key and, with an added refrain, it become popular as a congregational hymn. Actually, the "added refrain" had already been added before "Promised Land" was converted to a major key, as it had already appeared on page 51 of Durham's original 1835 version. Possibly Durham herself was the author of the refrain, as suggested by George Pullen Jackson. In any case, no refrain is included in the original text by Samuel Stennett. The refrain as worded in Durham's 1835 version is quoted here:

I am bound for the promised land.
I'm bound for the promised land
O, who will come and go with me?
I am bound for the promised land.

The question in the refrain, "O, who will come and go with me?" became so popular that it appears in at least three songs of later origin. Even before it was arranged in a major key, "Promised Land" was widely sung. Jackson ranks it as no. 20 in a list of "Eighty most popular tunes" selected on the basis of publication records from southern shape note collections.

Although Durham's name is associated with "Promised Land" in some modern accounts, it is missing in hymnals that include a majorized version of the tune. The editor who first published it in a major key was Rigdon McCoy McIntosh. When his version appeared in a hymnal, McIntosh failed to credit Durham. Subsequently, "Promised Land" appeared in many collections without mention of Durham. In some collections, the attribution "American Folk Hymn" appears; however, Jackson and others have shown that the possibly related folk tunes—of British origin, not American—differ substantially from "Promised Land".

Durham's "Promised Land" as published in Southern Harmony and The Sacred Harp is in three parts, unaccompanied, with the melody in the middle part. The key is essentially F♯ minor (actually, aeolian mode, also known as natural minor), with the melody in the middle part. An arrangement for unison singing with keyboard accompaniment and optional guitar is available:
