= Amzi Chapin =

- Born: 1768; Springfield, Massachusetts, USA
- Died: 19 February 1835 (aged 66–67) Northfield, Ohio
- Genres: Church music
- Occupations: singer, composer, music teacher
- Years active: 1790s to 1830s

Amzi Chapin (1768–19 February 1835) was an American cabinetmaker, singing-school teacher, shapenote proponent and composer.

== Biography ==
Chapin was born in Springfield, Massachusetts into a family of cabinet-makers. His father was Edward Chapin (1724–1800) of Chicopee MA. He had four older brothers (Aaron, Lucius, Alpheus and Edward), and a younger sister and brother (Eunice and Calvin). The family is believed to be of Puritan descent.

Chapin worked in Hartford, Connecticut from 1788 until 1791, when he moved to New Haven. Thereafter he embarked on a career as an itinerant singing teacher, composer and cabinetmaker in the South and Midwest.

Chapin married Hannah Power, daughter of Rev. James Power, on 10 October 1800 in Mount Pleasant, Pennsylvania, where he taught and farmed for the next thirty years. They had eight children including six daughters named Mary Jane, Eunice, Eliza, Rebecca and Hannah. All moved to Northfield except Mary who died in Pennsylvania at age 30.

A. Chapin's Journal Northfield, Ohio, becoming some of the pioneers of Northfield Township. In November 1831 Amzi Chapin wrote the original proposal and is listed along with eight other men founders of the Presbyterian congregation in Northfield Twp. He died there on 19 February 1835.

== Music ==
Chapin taught singing schools in Virginia and North Carolina, before moving to Kentucky and then Pennsylvania. He was a proponent of Andrew Law's four-note method of shape note notation. Lucius Chapin was also a singing teacher, and the two were apparently among the first to teach sacred music west of the Allegheny Mountains. The well-known tune "Primrose" (47t in the Sacred Harp) is by Amzi Chapin, while Lucius contributed "Vernon" (95) and the Ninety-Third Psalm (31t). "Olney" and "Rockingham" (63 and 300b in the Southern Harmony) are credited to "Chapin". The Shenandoah Harmony (2013) has reprinted 7 other tunes or arrangements by Amzi (including the popular Psalm 30 (22b), one by Lucius, and one by Amzi or Lucius.

== Bibliography ==
- Mary O. Eddy, "Three Early Hymn Writers" in Southern Folklore Quarterly, Vol. 10, no. 3 (Sept. 1946): 177–82, on Amzi Chapin (1768–1835), Samuel Wakefield (1799–1895), and Amos Sutton Hayden (1813–1880)
- David C. Thomas and Peter Benes, "Amzi Chapin: A New England Cabinetmaker Singing and Working in the South and Trans-Appalachian West" in Rural New England Furniture: People, Place, and Production, ed. Peter Benes (Boston University Press, Boston, 2000), pp. 76–99
- J. W. Scholten, The Chapins: a Study of Men and Sacred Music West of the Alleghenies, 1795–1842 (dissertation, University of Michigan, 1972)
