= Brethren, We Have Met Together =

- Folk hymn
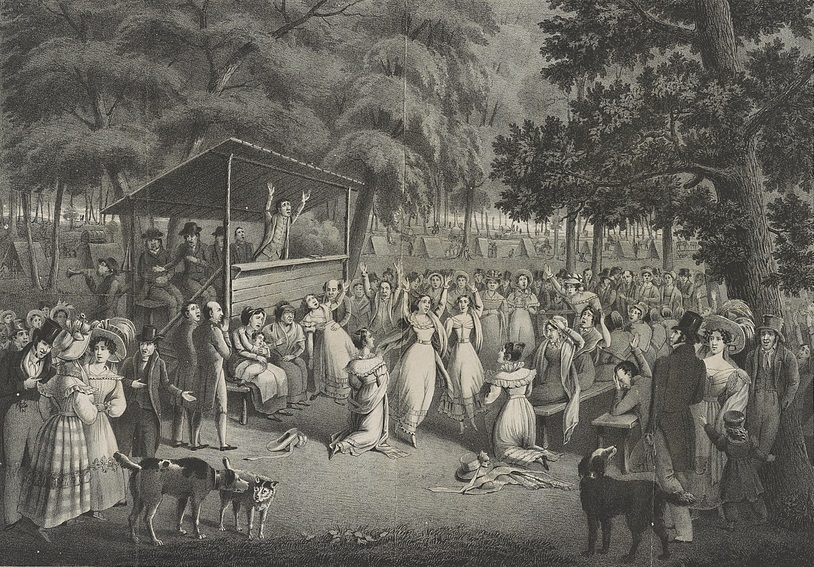
- Camp-meeting / A. Rider pinxit; drawn on stone by H. Bridport
- Text: by George Atkins
- Meter: 8.7.8.7 D
- Melody: Holy Manna
- Published: 1819 (lyrics); 1825 (tune)

"Brethren, We Have Met Together", commonly known by the first line "Brethren, we have met to worship", is one of the oldest published American folk hymns. The lyrics were written by George Atkins and first published in 1819. The traditional tune, Holy Manna, is a pentatonic melody in Ionian mode originally published by William Moore in Columbian Harmony, a four-note shape-note tunebook, in 1829. Like most shape-note songs from that century, it is usually written in three parts.

It is commonly sung as the opening song at shape-note singing events.

The song is also sung to the music of Beethoven's "Ode to Joy" and is printed with that music in some hymnals.

== Lyrics ==
The lyrics, from Southern Harmony, are:

Brethren, we have met to worship,
And adore the Lord our God;
Will you pray with all your power,
While we try to preach the word?
All is vain, unless the Spirit
Of the Holy One come down;
Brethren, pray, and holy manna
Will be showered all around.

Brethren, see poor sinners round you,
Trembling on the brink of woe;
Death is coming, hell is moving;
Can you bear to let them go?
See our fathers, see our mothers,
And our children sinking down;
Brethren, pray, and holy manna
Will be showered all around.

Sisters, will you join and help us?
Moses' sisters aided him;
Will you help the trembling mourners,
Who are struggling hard with sin?
Tell them all about the Savior,
Tell him that he will be found;
Sisters, pray, and holy manna
Will be showered all around.

Is there here a trembling jailer,
Seeking grace and filled with fears?
Is there here a weeping Mary,
Pouring forth a flood of tears?
Brethren, join your cries to help them;
Sisters, let your prayers abound;
Pray, O! pray, that holy manna
May be scattered all around.

Let us love our God supremely,
Let us love each other too;
Let us love and pray for sinners,
Till our God makes all things new
Then he'll call us home to heaven,
At his table we'll sit down.
Christ will gird himself and serve us
With sweet manna all around.
