= New Britain (tune) =

Melody used for hymns

The shape note score in the 1847 edition of Walker's The Southern Harmony, and Musical Companion. The lyrics of John Newton's "Amazing Grace" are credited to Staunton Burdett's Baptist Harmony (1834). C. M. is common metre.

"New Britain" is a hymn tune which was first published under other names in the early 19th century, including "St Mary's", "Gallaher", "Symphony", "Harmony Grove" and "Solon". In 1835, it was paired with the lyrics of John Newton's hymn "Amazing Grace" in William Walker's The Southern Harmony, and Musical Companion. This sold over 600,000 copies in multiple editions. Walker named the tune "New Britain" in that work and the combination was reprinted in The Sacred Harp (1844) which was even more influential. The name "Amazing Grace" was first used for the combination in Sankey's Gospel Hymns 2 (1877).

The tune is pentatonic and in Ionian mode.
