= Shenandoah Harmony =

Music book compiling various shape note songs

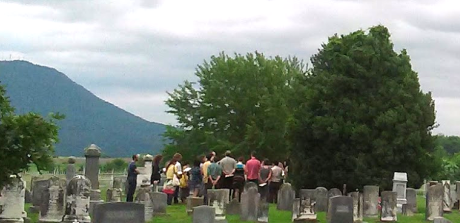
The annual all-day singing from the Shenandoah Harmony at Cross Keys typically ends by singing Davisson's "Retirement" at the graveside of the composer.

The Shenandoah Harmony is a 2013 publication including the works of Ananias Davisson (1780–1857) and other composers of his era, in the format used by modern shape note singing groups, in addition to contemporary compositions and tunes from other sources. Although a number of new shape-note tune books were compiled and published in the two decades leading up to the publication of the Shenandoah Harmony, this volume is notable as "the largest new four-shape tunebook published for more than 150 years". The book is named after Shenandoah Valley, whose importance in the emergence of a distinctive Southern shape-note singing tradition has been noted by many musicologists. Authentic South reporter Kelley Libby of WFAE, attending an all-day singing in Cross Keys, felt "transported to the Shenandoah Valley of the 1800s".

== Diffusion ==
All-day singing events dedicated to the Shenandoah Harmony have emerged not only in the mid-Atlantic region, but also in the UK, Ireland, and Germany. The popularity of the regional tunebook outside of the core area can be attributed to a design that has been optimized for sight-singing: "visually attractive, the songs are easy to read ... and the book feels good in your hand". Another reason is that shape note singers love minor-key songs, and the Shenandoah Harmony satisfies this peculiarity more than any other publication in current use, 52% of the tunes being minor. A third reason is that, although many shape note singers know of Ananias Davisson as the composer of the iconic tune Idumea, the Sacred Harp does not contain any other songs by him; thus, having an entire book inspired by Davisson's work appealed to many traditional shape note singers.

== Content ==
Book cover

The Shenandoah Harmony has been called a "curatorial" compilation of fasola repertoire from the mid-Atlantic region paying special attention to the works of Ananias Davisson. The curatorial focus is on the Kentucky Harmony (1816) and subsequent publications by Ananias Davisson, who lived in the Shenandoah Valley but cultivated a network of singing-school teachers and composers in Tennessee, Kentucky, and Virginia. The Shenandoah Harmony contains 24 compositions by Ananias Davisson, 52 songs from his Kentucky Harmony, and 46 songs from Supplement to the Kentucky Harmony. Works by other composers from his era have also been revived: five tunes by Elkanah Kelsey Dare, originally published in Wyeth's Repository, Part Second (1813); 13 by William Hauser (and another 13 from The Hesperian Harp, compiled and published by him in 1848); and 9 by Lucius or Amzi Chapin. Reflecting the vitality of the tradition as practiced today are dozens of new compositions by singers living at time of publication (2013). Tunes that already appear in the 1991 Denson edition of The Sacred Harp were avoided.

== Compilation and creation process ==
In 2010, the del Re family of Boyce, Virginia, who had been singing from publications of Ananias Davisson for 25 years, were joined by other singers who reviewed thousands of nineteenth-century shape-note songs from over seventy sources, as well as new compositions. Members of the Music Committee composed alto parts when they were lacking. New compositions by living composers were reviewed, and dozens were included—not as a separate section, but integrated with traditional tunes. The Music Committee limited their selections to songs that would be accepted by contemporary singers: "All killer, no filler", as member Leyland del Re explained to a journalist.
