= Robert Robinson (Baptist) =

English Baptist minister

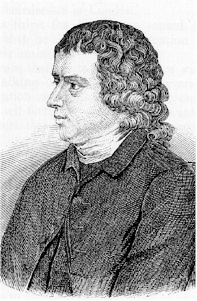
Robert Robinson

Robert Robinson (27 September 1735 – 9 June 1790) was an English Baptist scholar, author and preacher.

He published several books, including a work on baptism, History of Baptism and Baptists, appearing the year of his death. He wrote the hymns, Come Thou Fount of Every Blessing (1758), which he wrote at age 22 after converting to Methodism, and Mighty God, While Angels Bless Thee (1774).

== Early life ==
Robert Robinson was born in Swaffham in Norfolk, on 27 September 1735, to Michael Robinson, a customs officer, and Mary Wilkin, who had married by license at Lakenheath, Suffolk, 28 March 1723. His father died when he was aged five, and his maternal grandfather, Robert Wilkin, a wealthy gentleman of Mildenhall, who had never reconciled himself to his daughter's lowly marriage, disinherited his grandson (leaving an inheritance of only ten shillings and sixpence).

Robinson's uncle, a farmer, had sponsored Robinson's attendance at a school at Scarning, near Dereham, Norfolk, under Rev. Joseph Brett. When he was fourteen, Robinson was sent to London as apprentice to Joseph Anderson, a hairdresser.

Robinson's conversion came in May of 1752, which he documented in hand-written Latin that was later found and reported:

Robertus, Michaélis Mariæque Robinson filius. Natus Swaffhami, comitatu Norfolcie, Saturni die Sept. 27,1735. Renatus Sabbati die, Maii 24, 1752, per predicationem potentem Georgii Whitefield. Et gustatis doloribus renovationis duos annosque septem absolutionem plenam gratuitamque, per sanguinem pretiosum Jesu Christi, inveni (Tuesday, December 10, 1755) cui sit honor et gloria in secula seculorum. Amen.

This is summarised by Alexander Gordon, who wrote, "The preaching of Whitefield drew him to the Calvinistic Methodists; he dates his dedication to a religious life from 24 May 1752, his complete conversion from 10 Dec[ember] 1755."

Hence, he was drawn initially to Evangelical Methodism on hearing the Calvinist George Whitefield; as late as 1758 he was spending some months at a Calvinistic Methodist Chapel in Mildenhall. He was then invited to assist William Cudworth at the Calvinistic Methodist Norwich Tabernacle, but after a matter of weeks seceded to form a new Congregational Chapel in St Paul's parish, Norwich. In January 1759, he moved again, to Stone-Yard Baptist Chapel, Cambridge (St Andrew's Street Baptist Church).

Early on, and throughout his life, Robinson pursued a detailed study of the Scriptures and early Christian authors, which soon convinced him of the inefficacy of infant baptism, compared with the baptism of believing adults. This caused him some difficulty after he settled in Cambridge, with his large family of unbaptized children (see following).

== Ministry and later life ==
Robinson remained at Stone-Yard Baptist Chapel the rest of his life, first as Lecturer and then, from 1762, as Pastor.

Robinson's friends who occasionally attended him in Cambridge included John Randall (a Professor of Music), Thomas Fyshe Palmer, John Hammond, Robert Tyrwhitt, and William Frend. Alexander Gordon, writing for the Britain's National Dictionary of Biography in 1897, describes Robinson's schedule at the Chapel thus:

Sundays he preached twice or thrice at Cambridge; on weekdays he evangelised neighbouring villages, having a list of fifteen stations where he preached, usually in the evening, sometimes at five o'clock in the morning.

He goes on to note that despite an evolution in his thinking with regard to his own theology (see following), "in his own pulpit he did not introduce controversial topics", and that in his sermons, which, through written beforehand, "he invariably preached extempore", he exhibited "powers of plain speech, homely and local illustration, wit and pathos". A new chapel was built for him in 1764; his congregation came to number more than a thousand.

In addition to his success in his preaching ministry, Robinson continued in his research and writing, the accumulation of which would come to several volumes once collected, Interest in various works led to invitations by various organisations to provide resources for his visits and research, offers which included privileges at the Cambridge University Library, an offer of facilities at the British Museum so that he could come to London to collect material, etc. Robinson visited The University of Edinburgh in Scotland 1780; he was offered their honorary Doctor of Divinity, which he declined.

Late in life, Robinson was anxious to meet Joseph Priestley in Birmingham, and travelled there at the beginning of June 1790. On Sunday 6 June, he preached two Charity Sermons, in the morning at Priestley's New Meeting Chapel, and in the afternoon at the Old Meeting Birmingham, both in aid of the Sunday Schools of the Old and New Meetings. While in Birmingham, Robinson stayed in Showell Green, at the home of the Unitarian benefactor William Russell, Priestley's friend and sponsor at Birmingham.

== Personal life ==
Robinson wed Ellen Payne at Norwich in 1759, and the two went on to have 12 children.

In their Cambridge years, 1759 and onward, they first lived four miles from Cambridge, at Fulbourn, then in "a cottage at Hauxton" about the same distance from the Chapel, and finally, after more than a decade, to Chesterton (a mile or more from the Chapel, in June 1773). There he also "farmed a piece of land", later buying and rebuilding a house there for the family (1775), a purchase which Knight reports was of 80-acres near the river. It is reported both that he managed to "secur[e] his independence" through the farm effort, that "[h]is mercantile engagements drew the censure of 'godly boobies'", but also that in doing so "he neglected neither his vocation nor his studies" (see above regarding his preaching schedule in Cambridge).

With regard to the family's farming enterprise, it is variously written that the farm crops included wheat and barley, and that they kept sheep and cattle, and via the river location, that Robinson "did business as a corn... and coal merchant", with barges plying trade on the River Cam. It is also a matter of record that Robinson and his family were successful enough in their management of the venture, that by 1782 he was able to purchase two additional farms, consisting of 171 additional acres. Also a matter of record is the fact that it was a family venture, and that "[i]n 1785 he transferred his farming and mercantile engagements to Curtis, his son-in-law".

Alexander Gordon, writing for the Britain's National Dictionary of Biography in 1897, states unequivocally that despite all, Robinson was "[not] free from pecuniary anxiety", moreover, that the death of Julia, their daughter, at age 17 (on 9 October 1787, circumstances unknown) was "a severe blow" to him. Samuel Woolcock Christophers, author of Hymn-writers and Their Hymns (1870), relates a story from later in Robinson's life of a fellow coach passenger that called Robinson's attention to his hymn, "Come Thou Fount of Every Blessing". To her, Robinson is reported to have said, "Madam, I am the poor unhappy man who wrote that hymn many years ago, and I would give a thousand worlds, if I had them, to enjoy the feelings I had then."

It was during his working visit to Priestley in Birmingham, described above, that Robinson died. He was found dead in his bed on the morning of 9 June 1790. His wife Ellen outlived him by another 18 years, dying at age 75 on 23 May 1808. Robinson was interred in the Dissenters' Burial Ground at Birmingham, the ceremony being performed by Priestley.

In 1882 the Dissenters' Burial Ground was cleared for railway expansion and redevelopment in central Birmingham. The remains of Robert Robinson and others buried there were relocated to Witton Cemetery and marked by an obelisk.

== Views ==
=== Religious ===
While strongly affiliated with the Baptist religious movement of the time, Robinson also wrote for and was read throughout the growing Unitarian movement in England during his life.

=== Political ===
Gordon, writing in 1897 for the British National Dictionary of Biography, writes that Robinson was

[i]n politics a strong liberal, and an early advocate for the emancipation of the slave... [and that he] showed his theological liberalism by the part he took, in 1772, in promoting the relaxation of the statutory subscription exacted from tolerated dissenters.

== Published works ==
=== Books ===
Robinson published many works, both major and minor, many of which have been collected.

His works include;

- Arcana (1774)
- A translation of Saurin’s Sermons, in 5 volumes (1775–1782)
- A Plea for the Divinity of our Lord Jesus Christ (1776)
- An Essay on the Composition of a Sermon (1777)
- A Plan of Lectures on the Principles of Non conformity (1778)
- The General Doctrine of Toleration applied to the Particular Case of Free Communion (1780)
- Political Catechism (1782)
- An essay on the composition of a sermon (1782)
- An examination of Mr. Robinson of Cambridge's Plea for the Divinity of our Lord Jesus Christ (1785)
- Village Sermons (1786)
- The History of Baptism (1790)
- Ecclesiastical Researches (1792).

=== Hymns ===
- Come Thou Fount of Every Blessing (1758).
- Mighty God, While Angels Bless Thee (1774).
