= The Time Curve Preludes =

Composition for piano by William Duckworth

The Time Curve Preludes is a minimalist composition for piano solo by William Duckworth written between 1977 and 1978. This piece is credited as the first postminimal piece of music, and is his most frequently heard work. The Time Curve Preludes were composed between 1977 and 1978 on a fellowship from the National Endowment for the Arts. They were premiered at Wesleyan University in 1979 by pianist Neely Bruce. Duckworth used elements of Minimalism, including repetition and accessible harmonies, yet also embraced more quickly changing structures; wide-ranging, complex melodies; and colorful dissonances.

== Description ==
The Time Curve Preludes is a set of 24 short pieces for piano, and has been described by music critic Kyle Gann as the first work of postminimalism. The harmonic language is more active than preexisting minimalist conventions and doesn't satisfy the established expectations of minimalist practice. Along with its elements of minimalism, the preludes utilize many references to piano music of earlier periods, a tenet of postmodernism. The music makes reference to folk music, jazz, medieval music, Erik Satie, banjo strumming, and the style of Jerry Lee Lewis.

One of the facets of earlier minimalism is the lack of explicit structure, while this set of pieces are of much more recognizable structure, including the division of 24 separate preludes. The number of preludes itself is a reference to Bach's Well-Tempered Clavier, though it doesn't utilize every key as does the Well-Tempered Clavier. The composer also uses the Fibonacci series in developing proportional and rhythmic patterns, which were set out with the use of a numerical grid. The use of the Fibonacci sequence is not unique and appears in Bartok's music as well, and Duckworth's use of bitonality in Prelude No. 7 seems to be referential of Darius Milhaud's music. Most central to the piece is the Dies Irae, which is transformed into a major variant and serves as the central motive of the piece.
