= Singin' Billy =

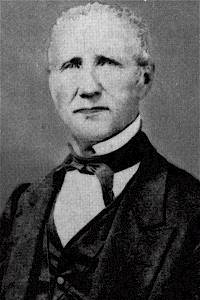
William Walker, "Singin' Billy"

Singin' Billy: A Folk Opera is a 1952 opera composed by Charles F. Bryan from a libretto by Donald Davidson. The narrative is loosely based on the life of the singing school teacher William Walker (1809–1875), who compiled the 1835 tunebook Southern Harmony. In the opera, Walker's virtue is contrasted with the corruption of Kinch Hardy, a local trouble maker in the fictional Oconee Town in Pickens County, South Carolina.

Walker had caught the attention of Southern folklorists and musicologists in 1933, when George Pullen Jackson, a friend and colleague of Davidson at Vanderbilt University, had covered him in his book White Spirituals in the Southern Uplands. The opera includes five hymns from Southern Harmony.

== Performance history ==
The premiere took place at the Vanderbilt University Theater on April 23, 1952. The production ran until April 28 and starred a cast from the Vanderbilt Theater and the music department of Peabody College. The libretto was published by The Foundation for American Education in 1985.

== Roles ==
| Role | Voice type |
|---|---|
| William Walker, "Singin' Billy" | baritone |
| Kinch Hardy, "a mountain boy" | tenor or baritone |
| Callie Wilkins, a widow, and town matriarch | alto |
| Jennie Alsop, the bride | part of the chorus |
| John Alsop, the bridegroom | part of the chorus |
| Gussie Epps, Kinch's sweetheart | soprano |
| Hank MacGregor, Callie's nephew, a young blacksmith | tenor |
| Margaret Williams, a young woman | soprano |
| Hezekiah Golightly, an elderly Revolutionary War veteran | baritone |
| Omer Dunavant, an awkward but apt pupil | part of the chorus |
