= Alexander Graydon =

Captain Alexander Graydon
- Born: April 10, 1752
- Died: May 2, 1818 (aged 66)
- Occupations: Author and officer
- Writing career
- Notable works: Memoirs of a Life, Chiefly Passed in Pennsylvania, Within the Last Sixty Years

Alexander Graydon Jr. (1752–1818) was a writer and officer in the American Revolution. He was commissioned captain on January 5, 1776, and commanded a company of men in the Battle of Long Island and in the Battle of Harlem Heights. He was taken prisoner during the Battle of Fort Washington. After the war, he was elected as prothonotary of Dauphin County, Pennsylvania (1785–1799).

He wrote his memoirs in 1811, chronicling his life and times in which he lived. His work became popular when it was republished posthumously in 1822, 1828, and 1846.

== Life and family ==
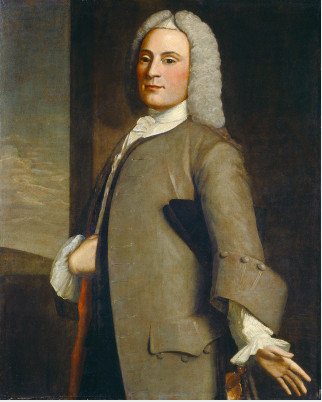
Graydon's father Alexander Graydon Sr. by Robert Feke, c. 1746

Graydon was born on April 10, 1752, in Bristol, Pennsylvania, to Alexander Graydon (d. 1761) and Rachel Marks (d. 1807). His parents were married on February 14, 1747. He died in Philadelphia on May 2, 1818.

== Publications ==
- Graydon, Alexander (1811). Memoirs of a Life, Chiefly Passed in Pennsylvania, Within the Last Sixty Years; With Occasional Remarks Upon the General Occurrences, Character and Spirit of that Eventful Period. Harrisburg: John Wyeth. OCLC 13597246.
- Graydon, Alexander (1822) [Harrisburg, 1811]. Galt, John (ed.). Memoirs of a Life, Chiefly Passed in Pennsylvania, Within the Last Sixty Years. Edinburgh: William Blackwood.
- Graydon, Alexander (1846). Littell, John Stockton (ed.). Memoirs of His Own Time. With Reminiscences of the Men and Events of the Revolution. Philadelphia: Lindsay and Blakiston.
- Alexander Graydon. Life of an Officer, Written during a Residence in Pennsylvania, Edinburgh, 1828.
