= Ananias Davisson =

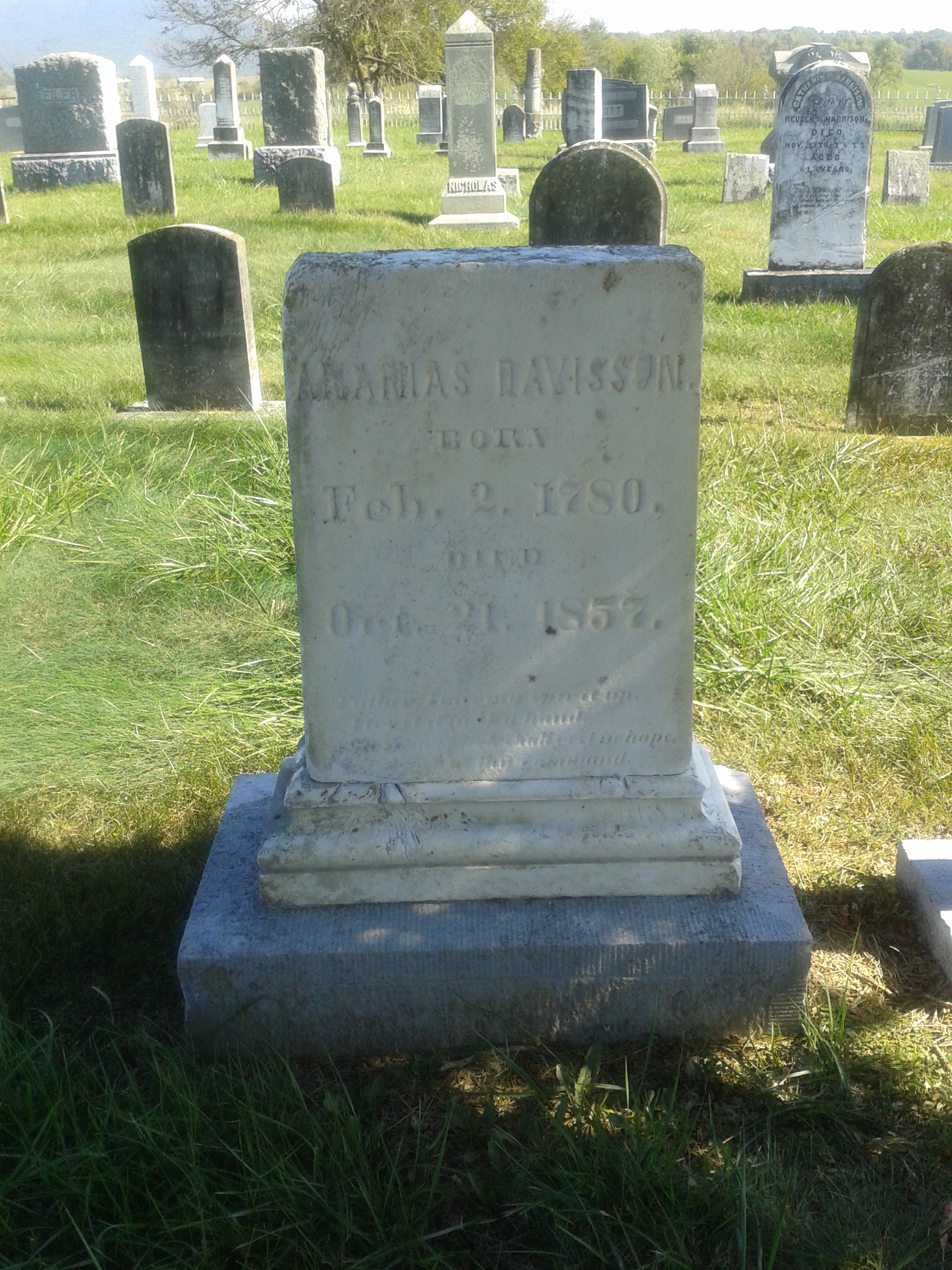
Grave of Ananias Davisson

Ananias Davisson (February 2, 1780 – October 21, 1857) was a singing school teacher, printer and compiler of shape note tunebooks. He is best known for his 1816 compilation Kentucky Harmony, which is the first Southern shape-note tunebook. According to musicologist George Pullen Jackson, Davisson's compilations are "pioneer repositories of a sort of song that the rural South really liked."

== Life and career ==
Davisson was born February 2, 1780, in Shenandoah County, Virginia. His wife was named Ann (surname unknown); they had no children. In 1804 he bought land in Rockingham County, supplementing his income as a farmer by conducting singing classes in the Shenandoah Valley. He established a printing shop in Harrisonburg in 1816, and in that year published the Kentucky Harmony, the first Southern shape note tunebook. As a printer, he cultivated a network of singing school teachers and composers in Virginia, Tennessee, and Kentucky who sold his tunebooks and sent him their own compositions. He spent his last years living on a farm at Weyer's Cave, about 14 miles from Dayton, Virginia, and died October 21, 1857. He is buried in the Massanutten-Cross Keys Cemetery, Rockingham County, Virginia. Davisson was a member and ruling elder of the Presbyterian Church, active in the Presbytery of Winchester and the Synod of Virginia.

== The Kentucky Harmony and early printing activities ==
There are records of a printing firm in Harrisburg called Davidson and Bourne active 1812-1816; there are reasons for believing that Davidson is a variant spelling of Davisson, who obtained shape note fonts and began a separate enterprise for publishing music in 1816. The Kentucky Harmony was printed early in 1816, and the same fonts were used later in the year to publish Joseph Funk's "Allgemein nützliche Choral-Music", a Mennonite tunebook in German, so it is believed that Davisson was the printer of Funk's tune book.

The invention of shape notes in Philadelphia in 1801 had greatly enlarged the market for printed music. Even during the Davidson and Bourne days, Davisson traveled extensively to supplement his income by teaching singing schools. Sometime during 1815-1816 he acquired shape note fonts and began to print music. Following the pattern of John Wyeth, who targeted his Repository of Sacred Music (1810, Harrisburg, Pennsylvania) to Calvinists, and the Part Second of the Repository (1813) to Methodists and Baptists, Davisson targeted the Kentucky Harmony to his fellow Presbyterians, and the Supplement to the Kentucky Harmony to Methodists. However, the idea, first used in the Repository, Part Second of 1813, of collecting folk tunes, harmonizing them, and using them as vehicles for hymn texts, was followed by Davisson from the very first. In contrast, the music advocated in New England and the Midwest by the "Better Music Boys" (e.g. Lowell Mason, Thomas Hastings, and others) sought to emulate European styles, while denigrating William Billings and other composers of the First New England School. The 1816 Kentucky Harmony has no European compositions, retains the best of the New England fuging tunes, makes extensive use of regional folk tunes, and has 60% of its songs in the minor key.

== A Supplement to the Kentucky Harmony ==
A Supplement to the Kentucky Harmony (Harrisonburg, Virginia: 1820) went through three editions. It was notable for its inclusion of English, Scottish and Irish folk tunes paired with spiritual texts. It included very little New England hymnody or church hymns. Davisson specifically dedicated it to his "Methodist friends" for use in their camp meetings.

The author's principle design in offering his Supplement is, that his Methodist friends may be furnished with a suitable and proper arrangement of such pieces as may seem best to animate a zealous Christian in his acts of devotion; and while they sing with the spirit, let them learn to sing with the understanding also.

The folk tunes themselves would have been familiar to the participants, making it easier to pair the religious texts. This was at a time when the Methodists were a much smaller, out of the mainstream religion.

== Other publications ==
Other books published by Davisson were Introduction to Sacred Music, Extracted from the Kentucky Harmony and Chiefly Intended for the Benefit of Young Scholars, (Harrisonburg, Virginia: 1821), and A Small Collection of Sacred Music (Harrisonburg, Virginia: 1825).

In addition to his own tunebooks, Davisson also printed Songs of Zion by James P. Carrell (1821) and Mennonite tunebooks for Joseph Funk.

== Idumea ==
Davisson's iconic tune first appeared in the Kentucky Harmony in 1816, based on a folk song, with treble and bass voices composed by Davisson, as a setting for Isaac Watts's "My God, my life, my love" (93 in Horae Lyricae: Poems, Chiefly of the Lyric Kind, 1707). Following the convention of using a toponym for the tune name, he called it "Idumea" (the name of Biblical Edom during the Roman period), pronounced "Eye-DEW-mee-a" or "Eye-DEW-mee" by traditional singers.

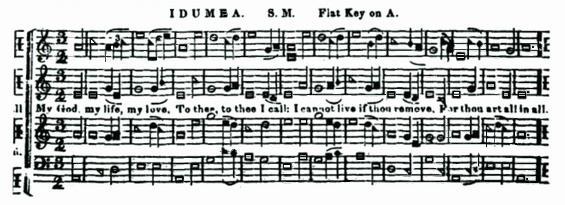
The tune "Idumea" as it first appeared in Ananias Davisson's 1816 Kentucky Harmony, in four parts, using lyrics by Isaac Watts, "My God, my life, my love."

The first appearance of the tune with the present words ("And am I born to die?"; Charles Wesley 1763, Hymn 59) is in the Southern Harmony (1835) by William Walker, who omitted the alto. When he again published the song in Christian Harmony (1867), Walker composed a new alto part, the one that is used today.

The song has a Roud Number of 6678. It has been covered by numerous folk music groups, such as The Watersons and The Young Tradition. The tune is also featured in the motion picture Cold Mountain (2003), during the scene depicting the Battle of the Crater; (the other shape song in the film, led in a church by Reverend Monroe (Donald Sutherland) is "I'm Going Home," page 282 in the Sacred Harp).

The tune has been arranged for SSATB choir and two violins by Richard Bjella, and during 1993–1996 Larry Bell composed an "Idumea Symphony" (Symphony No. 2, op. 40). The 2006 album Black Ships Ate the Sky by British experimental group Current 93 features several versions of "Idumea", each by a different vocalist, although only a couple use Davisson's tune. The 2012 album Silver & Gold by American singer-songwriter Sufjan Stevens also features the song, though its last verse is absent in this rendition.

== Davisson's songs today ==
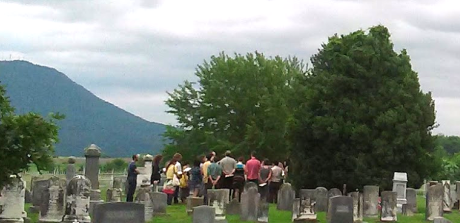
Singing Davisson's "Retirement" at his graveside, following an all-day singing from the Shenandoah Harmony (June 7, 2015).

Davisson's songs and the tunes he collected are in continuous use both in small group singings and at all-day shape note singing events. The Shenandoah Harmony (2013) contains 24 compositions by Davisson, 52 other songs from the Kentucky Harmony, and 46 songs from Supplement to the Kentucky Harmony, and is used in over a dozen all-day singings worldwide. The Missouri Harmony (2005 edition) contains 7 compositions and 8 arrangements, and the Christian Harmony contains Idumea, Imandra, and "The Lord's Supper."

The Sacred Harp (1991 edition) only has "Idumea," but it has been sung 2667 times at all-day singings during the period 1995-2019, and was the second most popular song in 2019, sung at 140 different all-day singings held around the world. "Imandra" was added in the 2025 revision.
