= John Wyeth =

American publisher (1770–1858)

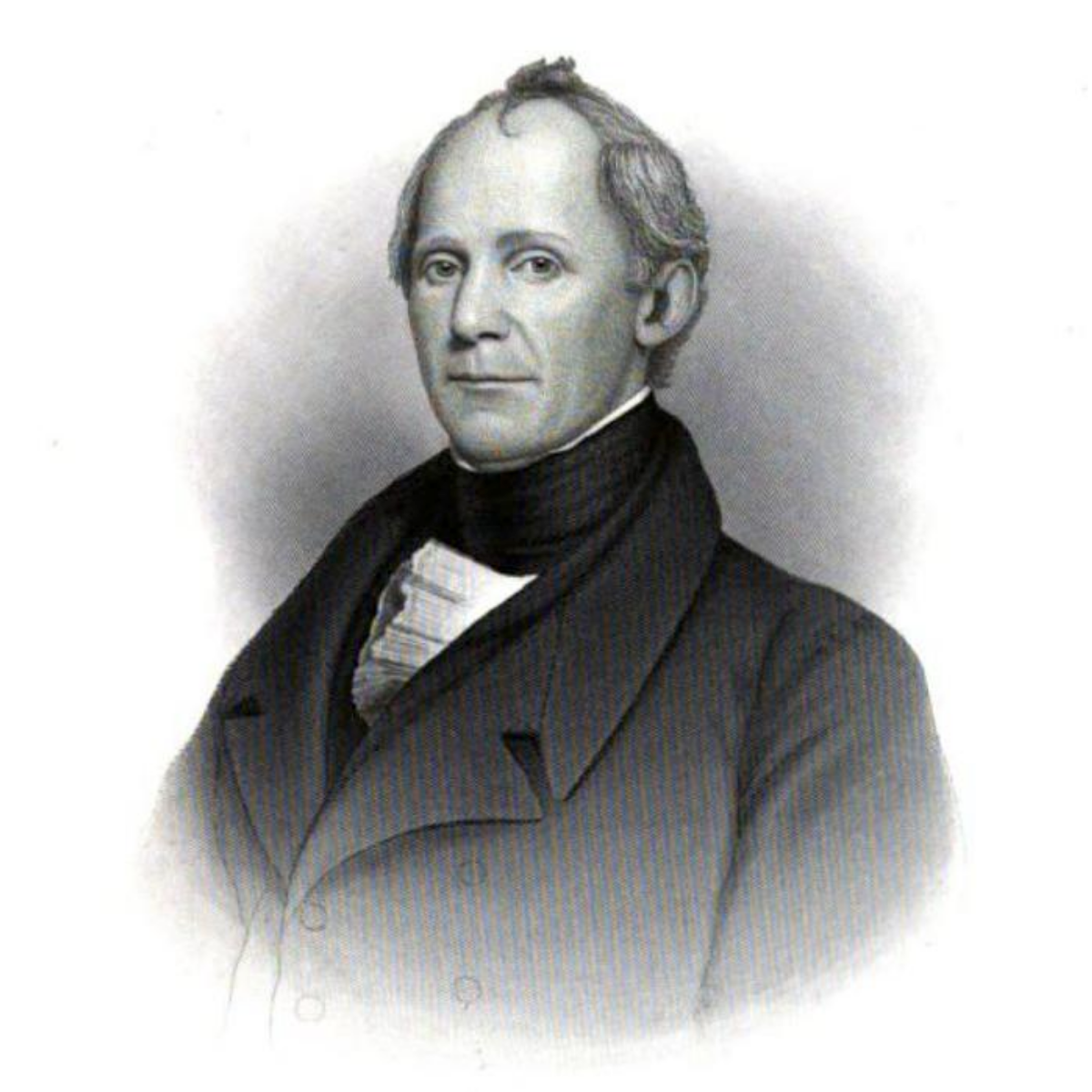
- Born: March 31, 1770; Cambridge, Massachusetts, U.S.
- Died: January 23, 1858 (aged 87); Philadelphia, Pennsylvania, U.S.
- Resting place: Laurel Hill Cemetery, Philadelphia, Pennsylvania, U.S.

John Wyeth (March 31, 1770 – January 23, 1858) was an American newspaper and book publisher. He published the Oracle of Dauphin newspaper in Harrisburg, Pennsylvania, from 1792 to 1827 and several hymnal books including Wyeth's Repository of Sacred Music, Part Second which had a major impact on shape-note song books in the Southern United States.

== Biography ==
Wyeth was born on March 31, 1770, in Cambridge, Massachusetts, to Ebenezer Wyeth II and Mary Wyeth. His father fought at the Battle of Bunker Hill, and his younger brother, Joshua Wyeth, participated in the Boston Tea Party. He learned printing through an apprenticeship and worked as a printer in Santo Domingo. After the outbreak of the Haitian Revolution in 1791, he moved to Philadelphia, and finally settled in Harrisburg, Pennsylvania. In 1792, he began the publication of the Oracle of Dauphin newspaper and worked in that role until 1827. In 1793, he was appointed postmaster by George Washington, but was removed in 1798 by John Adams who saw a conflict of interest in having a newspaper man also act as postmaster.

He established a book store and publishing house which published many books including History of the United States of America and Graydon's Memoirs. He discovered a market for tunebooks (with printed music) of sacred music at a time when "hymnal" referred to a book with words only. In 1810, he published Joseph Doll's Der leichte Unterricht in der Vokal Musik for the German-speaking market, and Wyeth’s Repository of Sacred Music, for moderate evangelical Christians. In 1813, he published a Second Part of the Repository of Sacred Music, containing songs for Methodists and Baptists. These works became extremely popular and sold over 150,000 copies.

Both versions of Wyeth's Repository of Sacred Music used the four-shape system of Little and Smith in The Easy Instructor to appeal to a wider audience. However, the inclusion of American folk tunes in Second Part strongly influenced subsequent folk hymn, camp meeting, and shape note collections. Musicologist Warren Steel sees Wyeth's Repository of Sacred Music, Part Second as marking "the end of the age of New England composer-compilers (1770–1810) and the beginning of the age of southern collector-compilers (1816–1860)."

Although published in the north, Wyeth's Repository of Sacred Music, Part Second, had a profound influence on Southern shape-note song books. Of the 41 folk-hymns introduced here, 10 were used by Ananias Davisson in the Kentucky Harmony (1816), 20 by William Walker in the Southern Harmony (1835), and six in the Sacred Harp (1844). The popular hymn, "Come Thou Fount of Every Blessing" was composed by Wyeth and was based on the tune Nettleton named for Reverend Asahel Nettleton.

One additional element of Part Second, the appearance of English hymns, such as the ten tunes attributed to Martin Madan, was part of an on-going trend in the northern states, but ignored by Southern tunebook compilers, who increasingly turned to regional folk tunes as sources of inspiration.

In 1818 he published Choral Harmonie enthaltend Kirchen-Melodien for German Lutherans.

Wyeth did not have any formal musical training or attend one of the singing schools typical of the time. He attributed his success to liking church music; knowing the "taste" of teachers (but not studying under them); and owning a collection of books from which to cull. Musicologist Irving Lowens suggests that his motivations may have been strictly business. Ross Ellison mentions the shrewdness in discovering a newly emerging musical market (revival music and camp meeting songs) as the significance of Wyeth's contribution to American music. Warren Steel qualifies this assessment by drawing attention to the fact that Wyeth grew up in the Boston-Cambridge area at a time when singing-schools were popular, and William Billings and others were creating American choral music.

He was a supporter of Harrisburg Academy and served as trustee and president.

His first wife was Louisa Weiss, together they had three children, but she died in 1822. He was remarried in 1826 to Lydia Allen. His son Louis Wyeth became a county judge of Marshall County, Alabama. After retiring, he moved to Philadelphia, where he died on January 23, 1858. He was interred at Laurel Hill Cemetery in Philadelphia.

== Publications ==
- Graydon, Alexander (1811). Memoirs of a Life, Chiefly Passed in Pennsylvania, Within the Last Sixty Years; With Occasional Remarks Upon the General Occurrences, Character and Spirit of that Eventful Period. Harrisburg: John Wyeth. OCLC 13597246.
- Wyeth, John (1813). Wyeth's Repository of Sacred Music, Part Second. Harrisburg: John Wyeth. OCLC 20911454.
