= Lee in the Mountains =

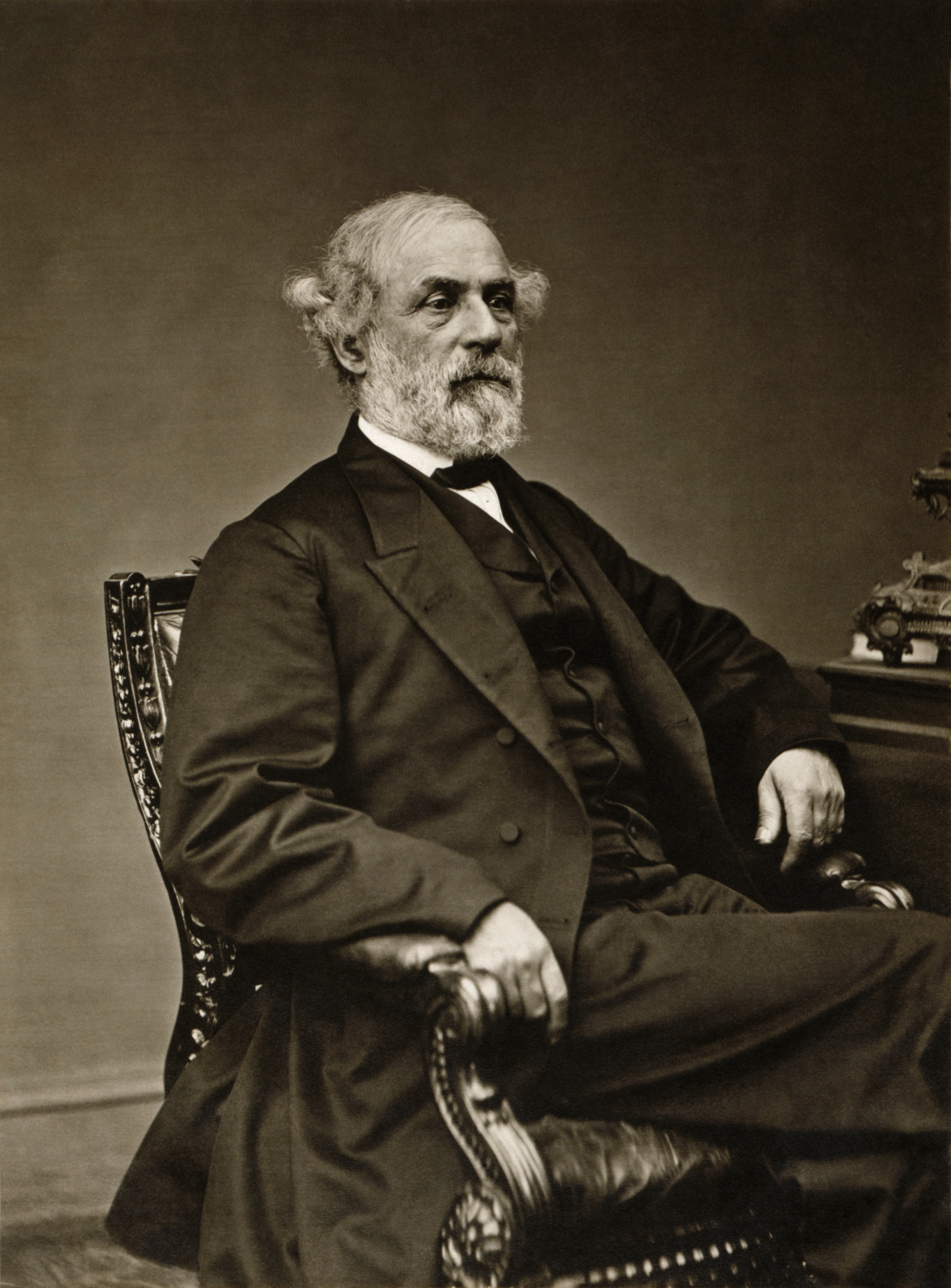
Robert E. Lee in 1869

"Lee in the Mountains" is a 1934 poem by the American writer Donald Davidson. It is 121 lines long and consists of a stream of consciousness from the former Confederate general Robert E. Lee, covering his internal conflicts late in his life, when the American Civil War was over and he was president of the Washington College.

Davidson conceived the poem in 1932–1933 when he lived in Marshallville, Georgia, and completed a 61-line first draft in August 1933, titled "General Lee Remembers". In total he wrote five versions of the poem. He sent the fourth version to Allen Tate and Caroline Gordon who praised it and gave him suggestions for improvement. He completed the final version in January 1934 and read it the same month at a luncheon in Nashville, Tennessee, hosted by the United Daughters of the Confederacy. It was first published in The American Review in May 1934. It is included in Davidson's poetry collection Lee in the Mountains and Other Poems, published in 1938.
