= John M. Sandidge =

American politician (1817–1898)

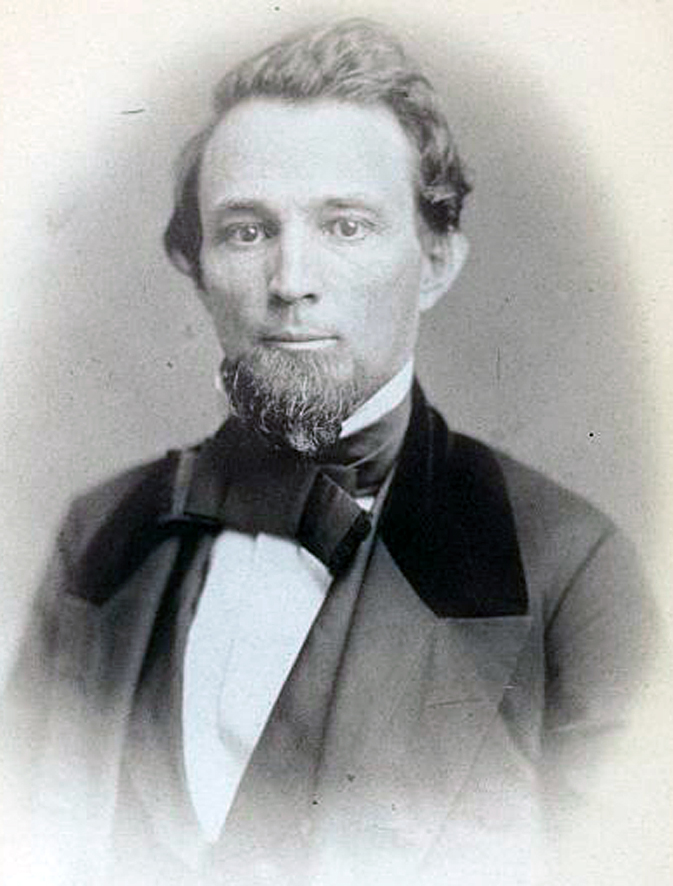

Member of the U.S. House of Representatives from Louisiana's 4th district
- In office March 4, 1855 – March 3, 1859

Member of the Louisiana House of Representatives
- In office 1846-1855

Personal details
- Born: John Milton Sandidge; January 7, 1817 Carnesville, Georgia, US
- Died: March 30, 1898 (aged 81) Bastrop, Louisiana, US
- Party: Democratic
- Spouse: Mary Elizabeth Gilmer
- Profession: Planter

Military service
- Allegiance: Confederate States of America
- Branch/service: Confederate States Army
- Years of service: 1861–1865
- Rank: Colonel
- Unit: Bossier Cavalry
- Battles/wars: American Civil War

John Milton Sandidge (January 7, 1817 – March 30, 1898) was a U.S. representative from Louisiana.

== Biography ==
Born near Carnesville, Georgia, Sandidge moved to Louisiana and became a planter. He served as colonel in the Mexican War. He served as member of the State house of representatives 1846-1855 and served two years as speaker. He served as delegate to the State constitutional convention in 1852.

Sandidge was elected as a Democrat to the Thirty-fourth and Thirty-fifth Congresses (March 4, 1855 – March 3, 1859). He served as chairman of the Committee on Private Land Claims (Thirty-fifth Congress).

He served throughout the Civil War as Colonel of Bossier Cavalry. When Brigadier General Henry Watkins Allen was made Governor of Louisiana, he called Colonel Sandidge to his staff as Chief of Ordnance, the position he held until the close of hostilities. Sandidge surrendered the archives of the State by special request of Governor Allen. Sons, James and George Sandidge served in the Confederate Army.

He died in Bastrop, Louisiana, on March 30, 1898, and was interred in Christ Church Cemetery.

== Notes ==
U.S. House of Representatives
Preceded by Roland Jones	Member of the U.S. House of Representatives from Louisiana's 4th congressional district 1855 – 1859	Succeeded by John M. Landrum
