= Holy Manna =

Holy Manna is the hymn tune originally written for "Brethren, We Have Met Together", which is one of the oldest published American folk hymns. Holy Manna is a pentatonic melody in Ionian mode. It was originally published by William Moore in Columbian Harmony, a four-note shape-note tunebook, in 1829, and is attributed to him.

Like most shape-note songs from that century, it is usually written in three parts. The meter is 87.87D.

== Popularity ==
In addition to being used in a significant number of early American hymnals, including Southern Harmony (#103) and Baptist Harmony (#1), Holy Manna appears in a large number of modern hymnals.

It is also used as a common tune for other songs, especially "God, Who Stretched the Spangled Heavens", "All Who Hunger, Gather Gladly", and "I will Arise and Go to Jesus".
