= The Big Ballad Jamboree =

Novel by Donald Davidson

- Author: Donald Davidson
- Language: English
- Publisher: University Press of Mississippi
- Publication date: 1996
- Publication place: United States
- Pages: 295
- ISBN: 9780878058532

The Big Ballad Jamboree is a novel by the American writer Donald Davidson, written in the 1950s and published posthumously in 1996. The story is set in the summer of 1949 in southwestern North Carolina. It follows the romance between Danny MacGregor, a hillbilly music singer, and Cissy Timberlake, a folk-music scholar and former singer. The novel's principal theme is the conflict between tradition and commercial prospects. Davidson was best known as a poet and The Big Ballad Jamboree was his only novel.

== Reception ==
Publishers Weekly's critic wrote: "the novel places a comic spin on the serious subject that Davidson explored as a Fugitive poet and Agrarian essayist: how urbanization can wreak havoc on rural society and the folk arts. ... Although the novel sometimes seems dated (Danny courts Cissie by defending her honor and buying her Cokes), the colloquial speech and concert scenes ring true." George Garrett reviewed the book: "The Big Ballad Jamboree is a light-hearted and (in a musical sense) light-fingered book, balanced, fair-minded, accessible, and clearly intended for a popular audience." Garrett continued: "Davidson clearly loved the land and the cycles and seasons of his homeplace, and that love shines through the descriptions of it. Environmentalists will feel a kinship with the author. Even the novel's strong streak of antifederalism (there's a child named States Rights) may be newly relevant to many readers."
