= Donald Davidson (poet) =

American poet (1893–1968)

- Davidson in 1956
- Born: Donald Grady Davidson; August 8, 1893; Campbellsville, Tennessee, U.S.
- Died: April 25, 1968 (aged 74); Nashville, Tennessee, U.S.
- Resting place: Calvary Cemetery, Nashville, Tennessee, U.S.
- Education: Vanderbilt University
- Occupations: Poet, college professor
- Spouse: Theresa Sherrer
- Children: 1 daughter

Donald Grady Davidson (August 8, 1893 – April 25, 1968) was an American poet, essayist, social and literary critic, and author. An English professor at Vanderbilt University from 1920 to 1965, he was a founding member of the Fugitives and the overlapping group Southern Agrarians, two literary groups based in Nashville, Tennessee. He was a supporter of segregation in the United States.

== Early life ==
Davidson was born on August 8, 1893, in Campbellsville, Tennessee. His father, William Bluford Davidson, was "a teacher and school administrator," and his mother, Elma Wells, was "a music and elocution teacher." He had two brothers, John and William. Davidson received a classical education at Branham and Hughes Military Academy, a preparatory school in Spring Hill, Tennessee. He earned both his bachelor's (1917) and master's (1922) degrees at Vanderbilt University. He served as a lieutenant in the United States Army during World War I.

== Career ==
Davidson was an English professor at Vanderbilt University from 1920 to 1965. While at Vanderbilt, Davidson became associated with the Fugitives, who met to read and criticize each other's verse. Later, they founded a review of the same name, which launched the literary careers of the poets and critics John Crowe Ransom, Allen Tate and Robert Penn Warren, the poet Laura Riding, and the poet and psychiatrist Merrill Moore. He enjoyed, for a time, a national reputation as a poet, in part due to the inclusion of his dramatic monologue, "Lee in the Mountains", in early editions of the influential college literature textbook Understanding Poetry. Its editors were his former students Warren and Cleanth Brooks. From 1923 to 1930, Davidson reviewed books and edited the Nashville Tennessean book page, where he assessed more than 370 books.

Around 1930, Davidson began his association with the Southern Agrarians. He was chiefly responsible for the decision of the group to write essays, published as the Agrarian manifesto I'll Take My Stand. Davidson shared the Agrarians' distaste for industrial capitalism and its destructive effect on American culture. Davidson's romantic outlook, however, led him to interpret Agrarianism as a straightforward politics of identity. "American" identity had become "characterless and synthetic," he argued in 1933. He encouraged Americans to embrace their identities as "Rebels, Yankees, Westerners, New Englanders or what you will, bound by ties more generous than abstract institutions can express, rather than citizens of an Americanized nowhere, without family, kin, or home." He was in favor of segregation.

In 1931, Davidson began a long association with Middlebury College's Breadloaf School of English. He bought a house in Vermont where he did much of his later writing. He taught at the Breadloaf School every summer until his death. In 1939 his textbook, American Composition and Rhetoric, was published and widely adopted for English courses in American universities.

Perhaps most widely read of his writings today is Davidson's two-volume history The Tennessee (1946 and 1948), in the Rivers of America series. The second volume is notable for its critique of the Tennessee Valley Authority (TVA) and the impact of its dam-building and eminent domain land seizure on local society. Although originally a supporter of the New Deal, he was suspicious that the TVA was a plot of northern business interests to exploit and dominate the South. He denounced the TVA as an instrument of political collectivism, run by outsiders, designed to destroy the South's traditions.

In 1952 his ballad opera, Singin' Billy, with music by Charles F. Bryan, was performed at the Vanderbilt Theater. His work as book page editor for the Nashville Tennessean was commemorated in 1963 with the publication of The Spyglass: Views and Reviews, 1924–1930. A comprehensive collection of his poetry, Poems: 1922–61, was published in 1966.

== Segregationist political activism ==
Davidson was a proponent of racial segregation and racial inequality. In an essay defending segregation in The Sewanee Review, described by historian Paul V. Murphy as his major work on the topic, he wrote: "The white South denies the Negro equal participation in society, not only because it does not consider him entitled to equality, but because it is certain that social mingling would lead to biological mingling, which it is determined to prevent, both for any given contemporary generation and for its posterity."

Davidson supported the 1948 presidential candidacy of Strom Thurmond, who was running as a Dixiecrat in opposition to President Harry Truman's civil rights proposals. He joined the Tennessee States' Rights Committee in 1950, and became the chairman of the Tennessee Federation for Constitutional Government (TFCG), the local analogue of the White Citizens Councils, at its founding in 1955. Under his leadership, TFCG led the failed effort to oppose the desegregation of Nashville's public schools. Davidson warned that if black students attended, "The capital city of Tennessee would become an uneasy island of integration surrounded by a tumultuous ocean of protest and discontent."

== Personal life and death ==
Davidson married Theresa Sherrer, a legal scholar and artist, in June 1918. They had a daughter, who married Eric Bell, Jr. They resided at 410 Fairfax Avenue in Nashville. He died on April 25, 1968, at age 74, at his home.

== Bibliography ==
=== Novels ===
- The Big Ballad Jamboree (1996, posthumous)

=== Poetry ===
- An Outland Piper (1924)
- The Tall Men (1927)
- Lee in the Mountains and Other Poems (1938)
- The Long Street (1961)
- Poems: 1922–1961 (1966) (collected poems), University of Minnesota Press, Minneapolis.

=== Opera ===
- Singin' Billy (1952)

=== Non-fiction ===
- I'll Take My Stand: The South and the Agrarian Tradition (1930, co-author)
- Attack on Leviathan: Regionalism and Nationalism in the United States (1938)
- The Tennessee (1946)
- Rivers of America (1948)
- Still Rebels, Still Yankees (1957)
- Southern Writers in the New World (1958)
- The Spyglass: Views and Reviews, 1924–1930 (1963)
