= William Duckworth (composer) =

American composer

- Born: William Duckworth; January 13, 1943
- Died: September 13, 2012 (aged 69)

William Duckworth (January 13, 1943 – September 13, 2012) was an American composer, author, educator, and Internet pioneer. He wrote more than 200 pieces of music and is credited with the composition of the first postminimal piece of music, The Time Curve Preludes (1977–78), for piano. Duckworth was a Professor of Music at Bucknell University. Together with Nora Farrell, his wife, he ran Monroe Street Music, the publisher of many Duckworth's pieces.

== Biography ==
Duckworth was born in North Carolina in 1943. He obtained a bachelor's degree in music from East Carolina University, then master's and doctorates in music education from the University of Illinois Urbana-Champaign. He studied composition under composer Ben Johnston and wrote his Ph.D. dissertation on the notation of composer John Cage. Duckworth received a 2002 Foundation for Contemporary Arts Grants to Artists Award, as well as a fellowship from the National Endowment of the Arts in 1977. Duckworth collaborated with his future wife, Nora Farrell, on his internet projects before marrying her. Over the years Duckworth enjoyed a close collaboration with James Jordan who frequently performs Duckworth's music with his world-renowned choral ensembles. Duckworth died at his home in West New York, New Jersey, after a long fight with pancreatic cancer.

== Work as a composer ==
Duckworth wrote more than 200 pieces of music. His best-known compositions include The Time Curve Preludes, 24 short pieces for piano, and Southern Harmony, which consists of 20 pieces for an eight-part chorus and employs features of shape note singing and minimalism. Other works include Mysterious Numbers, written for chamber orchestra, Imaginary Dances, for solo piano, and Simple Songs about Sex and War, written in collaboration with poet Hayden Carruth. "The Time Curve Preludes" were recorded by Bruce Brubaker in 2009, and by R. Andrew Lee in 2011. In the last months of his life, Duckworth completed a piano concerto for Brubaker.

== Publications ==
Author:

- Theoretical Foundations of Music 1978 with Edward Brown
- Talking Music: Conversations With John Cage, Philip Glass, Laurie Anderson, and Five Generations of American Experimental Composers 1995 (ISBN 0-306-80893-5)
- A Creative Approach to Music Fundamentals 1981 (ISBN 0-534-09420-1)
- 20/20: 20 New Sounds of the 20th century 1999 (ISBN 0-02-864864-1)
- Virtual Music: How the Web Got Wired for Sound 2005 (ISBN 0-415-96675-2)

Editor:

- Sound and Light: La Monte Young & Marian Zazeela 1996 (ISBN 0-8387-5346-9).
- John Cage at Seventy-Five 1989.

Foreword:

- Jazz: American Popular Music by Thom Holmes (2006).

== Career in education ==
Duckworth was professor and former chairman of the Department of Music at Bucknell University in Lewisburg, Penn. A 1992 profile in Rolling Stone magazine described him as a "hip, bright, innovative teacher." Duckworth instructed Martin Rubeo, founder of the alternative rock band Gramsci Melodic, when the latter was a student at Bucknell University.

== Internet activities ==
Much of Duckworth's late music was composed and performed as part of 'Cathedral'. Conceived in 1996 and launched on June 10, 1997, Cathedral is a work in music and art which depicts five "mystical moments in time": The building of the Great Pyramid in Giza, the building of Chartres Cathedral, the 19th century Native American Ghost Dance movement, the detonation of the atomic bomb, and the creation of the World Wide Web.

More recently, Cathedral has served as the site for the distribution of The iPod Opera 2.0: The Myth of Orpheus, the Chronicler and Eurydice, podcast in 26 episodes as MP3 and QuickTime video files. The video episodes may be downloaded and played on many different kinds of computer systems, including Apple OS, Windows and Linux computers, while the MP3 files may be downloaded and burned as an audio disk. The completion of the podcast in February 2007 was timed to coincide with the 400th anniversary of the first performance of Monteverdi's L'Orfeo.

Cathedral features an instrument called the PitchWeb, which allows anyone with a computer to play along with the Cathedral Band when the band is performing live over the Internet. Duckworth plays the PitchWeb on a laptop computer when the band performs live.

Cathedral was conceived during a conversation Duckworth had with his wife, Nora Farrell, a software designer who specializes in music and publishing web applications. Farrell collaborated with Duckworth on Cathedral and elements of it such as "The iPod Opera 2.0." As a member of the Cathedral Band, she edits the PitchWeb contributions by outside musicians.

A chapter in Duckworth's 2005 book, Virtual Music: How the Web Got Wired for Sound, discusses the Cathedral site.
