= Mary Beth Landrum =

British-American statistician

Mary Elizabeth Landrum
- Education: Massachusetts Institute of Technology; University of Michigan
- Scientific career
- Fields: biostatistics

Mary Elizabeth Landrum is a British-American statistician specializing in biostatistics, examining health services and the quality of health care delivery. She is a professor in the Department of Health Care Policy of the Harvard Medical School.

== Education and career ==
Landrum is originally from London. She majored in chemical engineering at the Massachusetts Institute of Technology, graduating in 1987, and then studied biostatistics at the University of Michigan, earning a master's degree in 1992 and completing her Ph.D. in 1995.

After postdoctoral research in the Department of Health Care Policy of the Harvard Medical School, she was hired by the department as an assistant professor in 1998. She was promoted to associate professor in 2005 and full professor in 2012.

Landrum's research focus is on the development and application of statistical methodology for health services research. She studies health care delivery, specifically examining the impact of provider characteristics on quality of care when providers are measured on more than one dimension of care.

== Recognition ==
In 2015, Landrum was named a Fellow of the American Statistical Association.
