= Robert Tyrwhitt =

Robert Tyrwhitt may refer to:

- Robert Tyrwhitt (academic) (1735–1817), English academic
- Robert Tyrwhitt (courtier) (by 1504–1572), member of parliament (MP) for Lincolnshire, 1545, and Huntingdonshire in 1554 and 1559
- Robert Tyrwhitt (MP died 1581) (c. 1510–1581), MP for Lincolnshire, 1553–1558

== See also ==
- Robert Tyrwhit (1698–1742), canon of Windsor and archdeacon of London
