= Elkanah Kelsey Dare =

American composer

Elkanah Kelsey Dare (15 January 1782 – 26 August 1826) was a Mid-Atlantic schoolteacher, composer of music, and Presbyterian minister. He was among the first American composers who published music in shape notes.

== Life ==
Elkanah Kelsey Dare was born in Salem, New Jersey, the son of Benoni Dare (1749-1802) and Damaris Kelsey (1748-1788). In 1804, he married Mary Shallcross Phillips (1785-1841), and they had ten children.

They moved to Wilmington, Delaware some time before 1809, and to Lancaster County, Pennsylvania, before 1818. Dare joined the Presbyterian church in Greenwich, Cumberland County, New Jersey, at age 23. Dare was hired by the Harrisburg printer John Wyeth as music editor for Wyeth's Repository of Sacred Music, Part Second (1813), where he is mentioned as being "late of Wilmington College," so this may have been the occasion of his move to Pennsylvania. From 1817 until his death, he pastored at the Union Presbyterian Church, Colerain Township, Pennsylvania. He also served as Dean of Boys at Wilmington College, Delaware. Dare died of swamp fever in 1826.

== Musical works ==
All of Elkanah Dare's ten compositions appear in Wyeth's Repository, 1813. Five of his compositions have recently been reprinted in the Shenandoah Harmony (2013), and three have been reprinted in the Valley Pocket Harmonist. (2024).

- Kedron (1799)
- Road's Town (1813)
- Babylonian Captivity (1813)
- Free scores available at The Choral Public Domain Library.

== Music Editor of Wyeth's Repository of Sacred Music, Second Part ==
In his introduction to the facsimile edition of Wyeth's Repository of Sacred Music (New York, Da Capo Press: 1974), musicologist Irving Lowens points out that there is no evidence for publisher John Wyeth having any music training. This was not necessary for the original Repository of 1810, which modeled itself on successful tunebooks by other publishers, using their most popular songs, and was designed to appeal to moderate evangelical Christians. The market for the Second Part three years later comprised Methodists and Baptists who were caught up in the enthusiastic revivalism of the time, and this required a real musician who could collect folk tunes, folk hymns, and camp meeting songs, transcribe them, and write harmonies. Elkanah Dare is the only person mentioned in this regard, though there may have been others.

The introductory essay to Wyeth's Repository of Sacred Music, Second Part is prefaced by an acknowledgement to Dare's editorial approach.

The following observations on Music are extracted, by permission, from the Manusript [sic] work of E. K. Dare, A.B. late of Wilmington College, which we hope, ere long to be published soon.

The value of these observations is mentioned by publishers of Southern tunebooks who placed increasing emphasis on regional folk tunes, although they do not mention Dare by name. There is no record of Dare's manuscript work ever having been published.

== Discography ==
- Babylonian Captivity - I Am The Rose Of Sharon - Early American Vocal Music Vol 1 CD
