= Landrum, South Carolina =

- City
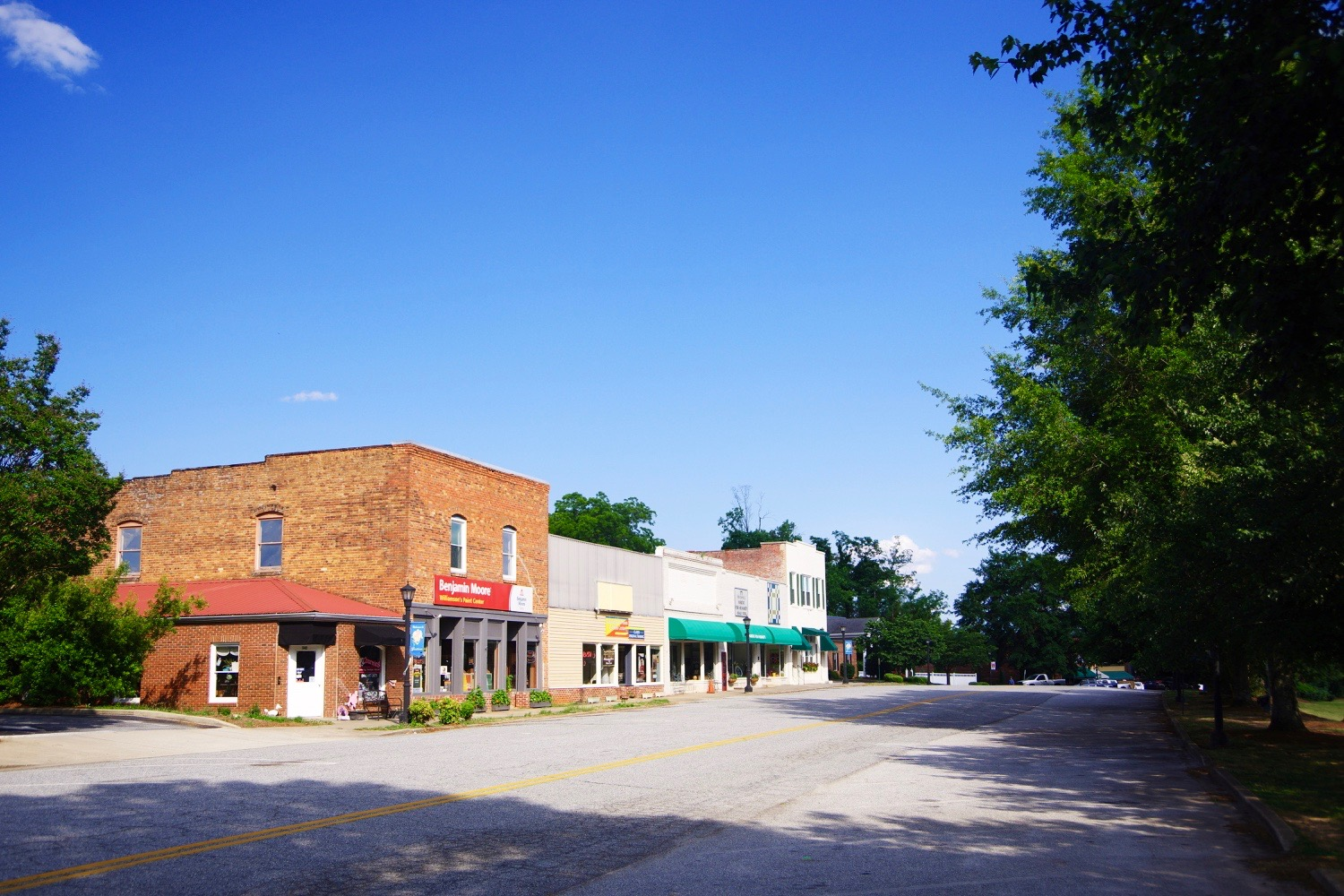
- Trade Avenue (S-562)

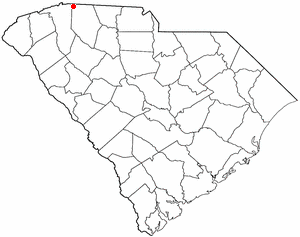
- Location of Landrum, South Carolina
- Coordinates: 35°10′29″N 82°11′06″W
- Country: United States
- State: South Carolina
- County: Spartanburg

Area
  - Total: 2.65 sq mi (6.87 km^{2})
  - Land: 2.64 sq mi (6.85 km^{2})
  - Water: 0.0077 sq mi (0.02 km^{2})
- Elevation: 1,024 ft (312 m)

Population (2020)
  - Total: 2,481
  - Density: 937.9/sq mi (362.11/km^{2})
- Time zone: UTC-5 (Eastern (EST))
  - Summer (DST): UTC-4 (EDT)
- ZIP code: 29356
- Area codes: 864, 821
- FIPS code: 45-40075
- GNIS feature ID: 2404882
- Website: http://cityoflandrumsc.com

Landrum is a city in Spartanburg County, South Carolina, United States. The population was 2,481 at the 2020 Census.

Landrum was founded in 1880 and incorporated in 1912. It is located just west of Interstate 26 between Spartanburg and Asheville, North Carolina.

== History ==
The Landrum area was settled circa 1760 by homesteaders from Pennsylvania, Maryland and Virginia. There, they built a fort approximately two miles from the current City of Landrum. The town of Landrum was founded in 1880 after the railroad was extended north from Spartanburg and named after John Gill Landrum, who gave the land for construction of the local depot. Landrum was incorporated as a town three years later. In 1973, it was made into a city.

== Geography ==
Landrum is concentrated around the intersection of U.S. Route 176 and South Carolina Highway 14, just south of the North Carolina-South Carolina border.

According to the United States Census Bureau, the city has a total area of 2.3 square miles (6.0 km^{2}), of which 0.43% is water.

== Demographics ==
Historical population
Census	Pop.	Note	%±
1890	155		—
1900	263		69.7%
1910	449		70.7%
1920	980		118.3%
1930	1,212		23.7%
1940	1,289		6.4%
1950	1,333		3.4%
1960	1,930		44.8%
1970	1,859		−3.7%
1980	2,141		15.2%
1990	2,347		9.6%
2000	2,472		5.3%
2010	2,376		−3.9%
2020	2,481		4.4%
U.S. Decennial Census

=== 2020 census ===
As of the 2020 census, Landrum had a population of 2,481 people and 632 families residing in the city. The median age was 47.8 years, with 19.9% of residents under the age of 18 and 25.2% aged 65 years or older. For every 100 females there were 89.2 males, and for every 100 females age 18 and over there were 82.6 males.

There were 1,122 households in Landrum, of which 27.3% had children under the age of 18 living in them. Of all households, 40.8% were married-couple households, 18.0% were households with a male householder and no spouse or partner present, and 36.4% were households with a female householder and no spouse or partner present. About 32.6% of all households were made up of individuals and 16.7% had someone living alone who was 65 years of age or older. There were 1,222 housing units, of which 8.2% were vacant. The homeowner vacancy rate was 3.7% and the rental vacancy rate was 8.1%.

97.4% of residents lived in urban areas, while 2.6% lived in rural areas.

Racial composition as of the 2020 census
Race	Number	Percent
White	2,064	83.2%
Black or African American	225	9.1%
American Indian and Alaska Native	2	0.1%
Asian	11	0.4%
Native Hawaiian and Other Pacific Islander	0	0.0%
Some other race	72	2.9%
Two or more races	107	4.3%
Hispanic or Latino (of any race)	103	4.2%

=== 2000 census ===
As of the census of 2000, there were 2,472 people, 1,040 households, and 691 families residing in the city. The population density was 1,053.7 inhabitants per square mile (406.8/km^{2}). There were 1,107 housing units at an average density of 471.9 per square mile (182.2/km^{2}). The racial makeup of the city was 81.84% White, 15.86% African American, 0.08% Native American, 0.53% Asian, 0.81% from other races, and 0.89% from two or more races. Hispanic or Latino of any race were 1.78% of the population.

There were 1,040 households, out of which 28.6% had children under the age of 18 living with them, 47.1% were married couples living together, 14.8% had a female householder with no husband present, and 33.5% were non-families. 30.2% of all households were made up of individuals, and 14.5% had someone living alone who was 65 years of age or older. The average household size was 2.36 and the average family size was 2.93.

In the city, the population was spread out, with 23.7% under the age of 18, 7.2% from 18 to 24, 27.3% from 25 to 44, 23.4% from 45 to 64, and 18.5% who were 65 years of age or older. The median age was 39 years. For every 100 females, there were 91.8 males. For every 100 females age 18 and over, there were 85.9 males.

The median income for a household in the city was $29,583, and the median income for a family was $40,347. Males had a median income of $28,375 versus $20,784 for females. The per capita income for the city was $14,259. About 10.4% of families and 15.0% of the population were below the poverty line, including 17.7% of those under age 18 and 18.9% of those age 65 or over.

== Education ==
It is in the Spartanburg School District 1. Public schools include O.P. Earle Elementary, serving grades PK–5, Landrum Middle, serving grades 5–8, and Landrum High, serving grades 9–12.

Grace Christian School, which serves grades PK–12, is a private institution.

Landrum has a lending library, a branch of the Spartanburg County Public Library.
