= Charles F. Bryan =

- Born: July 26, 1911
- Died: July 7, 1955 (aged 43)
- Genres: folk music

Charles Faulkner Bryan (July 26, 1911 – July 7, 1955) was an American composer, musician, music educator and collector of folk music.

== Life and career ==
Bryan was born in McMinnville, Tennessee, in 1911. He was attracted to music from a young age and became particularly interested in the music of the Appalachian region.

In addition to being a pioneer in the study of folk music, Bryan is considered by many to be one of Tennessee's greatest composers and musicians. Bryan also taught at Tennessee Polytechnic Institute in Cookeville, Tennessee, where he was head of the Department of Music from 1936 to 1939.

During the Great Depression, he worked as a director of music and library projects of the federal Works Projects Administration in their southeastern region. He engaged in folklore studies to record and preserve music and other folklore of the Appalachian region.

In the post-World War II years, Bryan served on the faculty of George Peabody College (1947–1952) in Nashville, and served as president of the Tennessee Folklore Society. He taught at the Indian Spring School for Boys near Birmingham, Alabama, for a brief period after it opened in 1952.

He died on July 7, 1955, in Pinson, Alabama.

== Legacy ==
According to his biographer, Carolyn Livingston, Bryan was "a pioneer in the study of American folk music" who created in his students "a sense of value for the folk ballads and hymns of Appalachia". He composed the music of Singin' Billy: A Folk Opera (1952), possibly his best known work, with Donald Davidson writing the libretto or text. "Singin' Billy" was the nickname of shape note composer and publisher William Walker. With George Pullen Jackson, he wrote the text American Folk Music for High School and other Choral Groups.

Bryan's namesake son served as president and CEO of the Virginia Historical Society until retiring in November 2008.

In 1977, an historical marker honoring Bryan was erected in front of the Warren County courthouse in McMinnville. It reads, "A native of Warren County, Bryan was a pioneer in the study of American folk music. Through his talented efforts this distinctively American form of musical expression gained worldwide fame and appreciation. He worked closely with the people of the Southern mountains and coves in the study of this music, but his work earned a permanent place of honor and distinction in the highest ranks of academic and scholarly achievement. Presented in his memory by a grateful community."

Tennessee Technological University's Bryan Fine Arts Building (BFA) is home to the College of Fine Arts as well as the Wattenbarger Auditorium. Constructed in 1981, this building is named for Bryan. The Bryan Symphony Orchestra, composed of Tech Faculty, talented students, and area professionals is named in his honor and performs at the Bryan Fine Arts Center. In 2011, the School of Music at TTU hosted his biographer and members of Bryan's family in a celebration of the 100th anniversary of the composer's birth. TTU awarded a research grant to Director of Orchestras, Professor Dan Allcott, to create a Bryan archive at the university's library. Allcott also created a modern performing edition of Bryan's "Bell Witch Cantata" which had been premiered by Robert Shaw at Carnegie Hall in 1947. The Cantata had its first 21st century performances shortly afterward.
