= John M. Landrum =

Louisiana lawyer and politician (1815–1861)

John Morgan Landrum

Member of the U.S. House of Representatives from Louisiana's 4th district
- In office March 4, 1859 – March 3, 1861
- Preceded by: John M. Sandidge
- Succeeded by: Vacant

Mayor of Shreveport, Louisiana
- In office 1848–1849

Personal details
- Born: July 3, 1815 Edgefield County, South Carolina, U.S.
- Died: October 7, 1861 (aged 46) Shreveport, Louisiana, U.S.
- Resting place: Oakland Cemetery, Shreveport, Louisiana
- Party: Democratic
- Education: University of South Carolina
- Profession: Lawyer, Politician

John Morgan Landrum (July 3, 1815 – October 7, 1861) was a Democratic U.S. Representative from Louisiana serving in the 36th Congress from 1859 to 1861.

Shortly after Louisiana seceded from the Union in January 1861, Landrum vacated his seat.

== Life and career ==
Born in Edgefield District, South Carolina, Landrum pursued classical studies at South Carolina College (now the University of South Carolina) at Columbia, graduating in 1842. He taught school for several years as he studied law. He was admitted to the bar in 1844 and commenced practice in Shreveport, Louisiana.

=== Political career ===
He served one term as mayor of Shreveport in 1848 and 1849.

Landrum was elected in November 1859 as a Democrat to the 36th Congress, taking 73% of the vote against Opposition Party candidate M.A. Jones. He remained absent from Congress from February 5, 1861, to the end of the 36th Congress following Louisiana's secession from the Union.

=== Later career and death ===
He continued to practice law until his death in Shreveport on October 7, 1861. Two weeks prior to his death, Landrum was involved in a serious buggy accident in which he broke his leg.

He was interred in Oakland Cemetery in Shreveport.

U.S. House of Representatives
| Preceded by John M. Sandidge | Member of the U.S. House of Representatives from Louisiana's 4th congressional district 1859 – 1861 | Succeeded by Vacant due to Civil War |
