= John Gill Landrum =

Reverend John Gill Landrum
- Church: Baptist
- Installed: 1830
- Term ended: 1882
- Predecessor: Thomas Bomar

Orders
- Ordination: 1830

Personal details
- Born: October 22, 1810 Rutherford County, Tennessee
- Died: January 19, 1882 (aged 71) Landrum, South Carolina
- Denomination: Baptist
- Spouse: Elizabeth Montgomery

John Gill Landrum (October 22, 1810 – January 19, 1882) was a Baptist pastor from Spartanburg, South Carolina, the namesake of Landrum, South Carolina. He signed the South Carolina Ordinance of Secession.

He was most prominently at Mount Zion Baptist Church, where he is buried. He also served Bethlehem Baptist Church.

== Early years ==
Landrum was born to Rev. Merriman Landrum in Rutherford County, Tennessee. He was baptized in 1824, and moved to South Carolina in 1828.

== American Revolution ==
He was conversant in the history of the state, and when a monument was erected on the Cowpens battlefield in 1856, gave a speech. He was also at the 1855 celebration of the Battle of King's Mountain.

Landrum gave the funeral sermon for Joshua Hawkins, a member of his church and hero of both Cowpens and King's Mountain. Hawkins had a ball from a British gun in his leg all his life, but did not wish to be buried with it. Landrum exhibited the ball at his funeral.

== Civil War ==
He was a delegate to the secession convention of South Carolina and signed the Ordinance of Secession. During the Civil War, he was a Confederate who was the chaplain of the 13th Infantry regiment.

== Personal ==
He was the father of physician and town historian J. B. O. Landrum. He was a contributor to the Southern Harmony; another contributor was Matilda T. Durham, at whose marriage he officiated. On his death, musician A. J. Turner wrote this acrostic:

Lo! a Prince in Zion has been taken away.

And mourners thread the streets day after day.

No face is seen that does not deepest sorrow show;

Departed are our joys and only bitter woe

Remains, since thou, oh! Counselor and friend,

Unto thy grave are gone can no longer lend

Mankind thy sage advise - God pity on us send.
