= Kentucky Harmony =

Shape note tunebook

1826 edition of the Kentucky Harmony

The Kentucky Harmony is a shape note tunebook, published in 1816 by Ananias Davisson. It is the first Southern shape-note tunebook.

The first edition of the Kentucky Harmony was 140 pages and contained 143 tunes. Davisson released four more editions: 1817 (which expanded the book to 160 pages), 1819, 1821 and 1826. The 1817 edition used fewer northern tunes but included more Southern folk melodies; the three subsequent editions made only slight changes to the 1817 edition. The Kentucky Harmony was influenced by the work of John Wyeth and his two "Repositories of Sacred Music", with 98 of the tunes in Kentucky Harmony also being found in Wyeth's books. But Davisson rarely printed any piece of music exactly as it appeared in the books of others. Unlike some books printed prior to and after it, the Kentucky Harmony consistently contained four part settings for its tunes. Fifty-seven of the 143 tunes of the first edition are fuguing tunes, and the first Southern fuguing tunes appear, such as Reubin Monday's "New Topia," in which there is call-and-response between duetting voices (alto & bass for four measures, followed by treble & tenor for four measures), rather than individual voices coming in soon after one another. Roughly 60% of the tunes are minor. The influence of the Kentucky Harmony can be seen in later tunebooks, even as late as Walker's Southern Harmony and B. F. White's Sacred Harp. Irving Lowens considered the Kentucky Harmony "one of the most important and influential collections of American folk hymnody ever compiled..."

Despite the name Kentucky Harmony, Davisson lived most of his life in the Shenandoah Valley of Virginia.
