= William Walker (composer) =

American songwriter

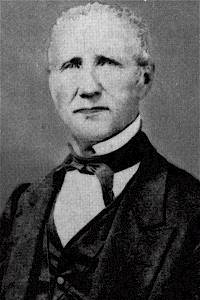
William Walker

William Walker (May 6, 1809 – September 24, 1875) was an American Baptist song leader, shape note "singing master", and compiler of four shape note tunebooks, most notable of which are the influential The Southern Harmony and The Christian Harmony, which has been in continuous use (republished 2010).

== Life ==
Walker was born in Martin's Mills (near Cross Keys), South Carolina, and grew up near Spartanburg. From an early age he became deeply involved in music and became a song leader in the Baptist church. To distinguish him from other William Walkers in Spartanburg, he was nicknamed Singing Billy.

He married Amy Golightly in 1832 and they lived in Spartanburg. Her sister Thurza had married Benjamin Franklin White in 1825; while is clear that there was strife between the two brothers-in-law, there is no evidence for the claim, sometimes heard among Sacred Harp singers, that B.F. White helped Walker compile the Southern Harmony, only to be cheated of authorship rights when it was finally published. In 1842 the Whites moved from Spartanburg District, SC to Harris County, Georgia, and in 1844 B. F. White, in concert with Elisha J. King published The Sacred Harp.

Walker died in Spartanburg in 1875. Walker is buried in Magnolia Cemetery, Spartanburg, Spartanburg County, South Carolina.

== Tunebooks ==
Walker learned shape note music in singing schools; it had been used by Baptist and Methodist preachers in the Second Great Awakening to help spread Christianity in the South. Because the music could be read and sung by amateurs, hymns in shape note annotation became the centerpiece of many revivals and camp meetings on the frontier. Walker composed his first piece of music at the age of 18.

In 1835, Walker published a tunebook entitled The Southern Harmony, a compilation of hymns using the four-shape shape note system of notation. This collection was revised in 1840, 1847 and 1854. In 1846 he issued The Southern and Western Pocket Harmonist. Intended as an appendix to the Southern Harmony, the Pocket Harmonist contains numerous camp-meeting songs with their refrains.

After the Civil War, Walker published a tunebook entitled The Christian Harmony (1867), in which he adopted a seven-shape notation. He incorporated over half of the contents of The Southern Harmony into the Christian Harmony, adding alto parts to those pieces which had lacked them. For the additional three shapes, Walker devised his own system - an inverted key-stone for "do", a quarter-moon for "re", and an isosceles triangle for "si" (or "ti"). Walker issued an expanded edition of Christian Harmony in 1873. In the same year, he published a collection of Sunday school songs entitled Fruits and Flowers.

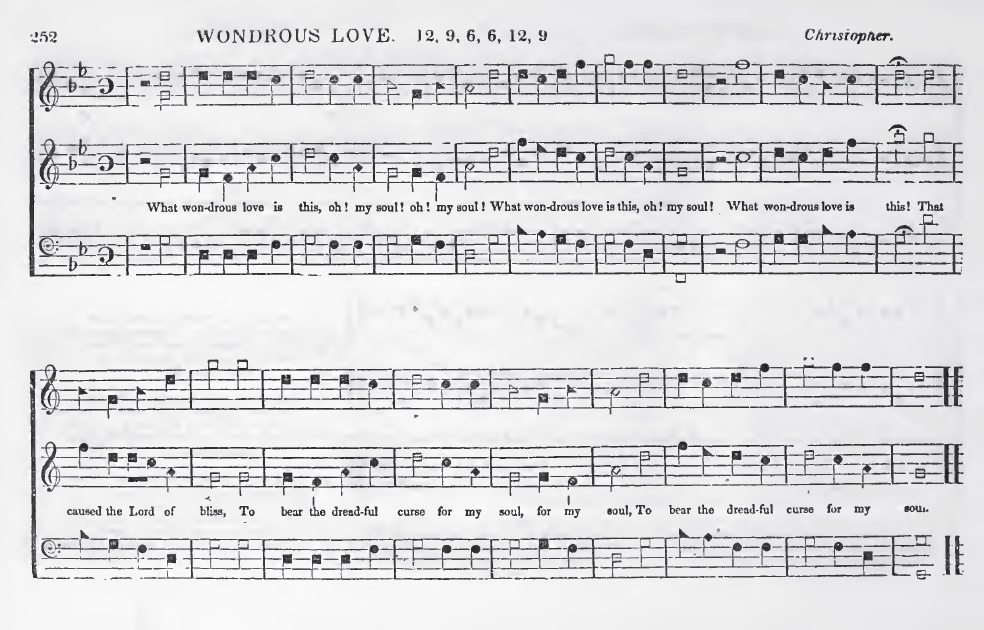
What Wondrous Love Is This

== As composer ==
Walker is listed as the composer of many of the tunes in The Southern Harmony. But, he acknowledged that in many cases, he borrowed his tunes, probably from the living tradition of folk music that surrounded him. Glenn C. Wilcox (references below) describes the process as follows, quoting from Walker's own introduction:

to a "great many good airs (which I could not find in any publication, nor in manuscript)" he has written parts and assigned himself as composer. This ... shows his tacit acceptance of the commonality of many of the tunes... and the probability that many had achieved the status of folk song, although he of course did not use that term.

In working from original tune to finished hymn, Walker borrowed lyrics from established poets such as Charles Wesley (a common practice in his tradition), who had set many of his works to music earlier. Walker added treble (upper) part and bass parts, to create three-part harmony.

"Amazing Grace" (string version)
Instrumental (string) rendition of hymn tune "New Britain", commonly known as "Amazing Grace" after the most famous hymn text attached to the tune, performed by the United States Air Force Band Strolling Strings. Walker assigned the lyrics to this melody that it continues to be associated with.

"Amazing Grace" (brass version)
Instrumental (brass) rendition of hymn tune "New Britain" ("Amazing Grace")

== Legacy ==
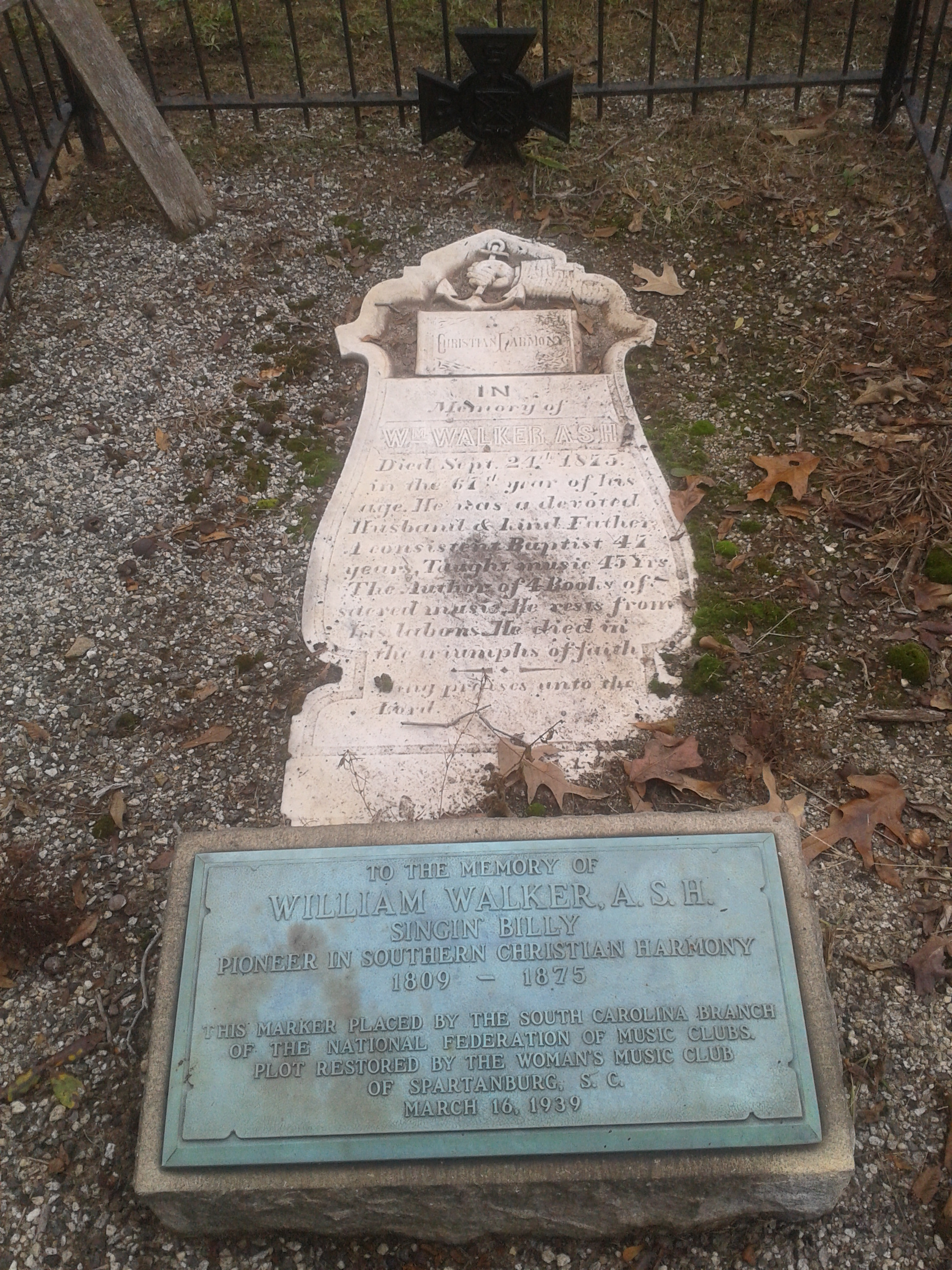
William Walker's grave in Spartanburg, South Carolina

Two of Walker's tunebooks remain in print. Facsimiles of his Southern Harmony (1854 edition) continue in use at an annual singing in Benton, Kentucky. Until 2010, Walker's Christian Harmony existed in two editions: a facsimile reprint of the 1873 edition, and a revision by O.A. Parris and John Deason first published in 1958, employing the more familiar note-shapes of Jesse B. Aikin.

In 2010, a combined version of the Christian Harmony, known as the Georgia Christian Harmony or the Christian Harmony 2010, was published, using Aikin's shape-note system. The Christian Harmony 2010 incorporated the entire contents of both the 1873 edition and the 1958 Deason-Parris edition, plus a number of new songs.

Walker's compositions and arrangements are widely sung today by Sacred Harp singers as well as others. His work is represented by 13 songs in the current 1991 "Denson" edition of The Sacred Harp, and by 12 in the "Cooper" edition. According to the collated minutes kept by the Sacred Harp Musical Heritage Association, his song "Hallelujah" is sung more frequently at Sacred Harp conventions than is any other. The Walker songs are generally sung in four-part versions, with alto parts that were added by early 20th-century composers.

The first Christian Harmony All-Day Singing in Europe took place on Sunday, 27 October 2013 at St Mary's Church in Primrose Hill, London. The event was hosted by the Sacred Harp Singers of London, who regularly sing from Walker's Christian Harmony (2010). In attendance were Sacred Harp singers from the UK & Ireland, Europe, and the US.

== Representation in other media ==
- Charles Faulkner Bryan composed the music of folk opera Singin' Billy (1952), base on a libretto by Donald Davidson and featuring Walker as the main figure. The opera incorporates five hymns from Southern Harmony.
- Donald Grantham incorporated several tunes from Walker's Southern Harmony in his 1998 Southern Harmony, a work for wind band.
