= Southern Harmony =

Shape note hymn and tune book compiled by William Walker

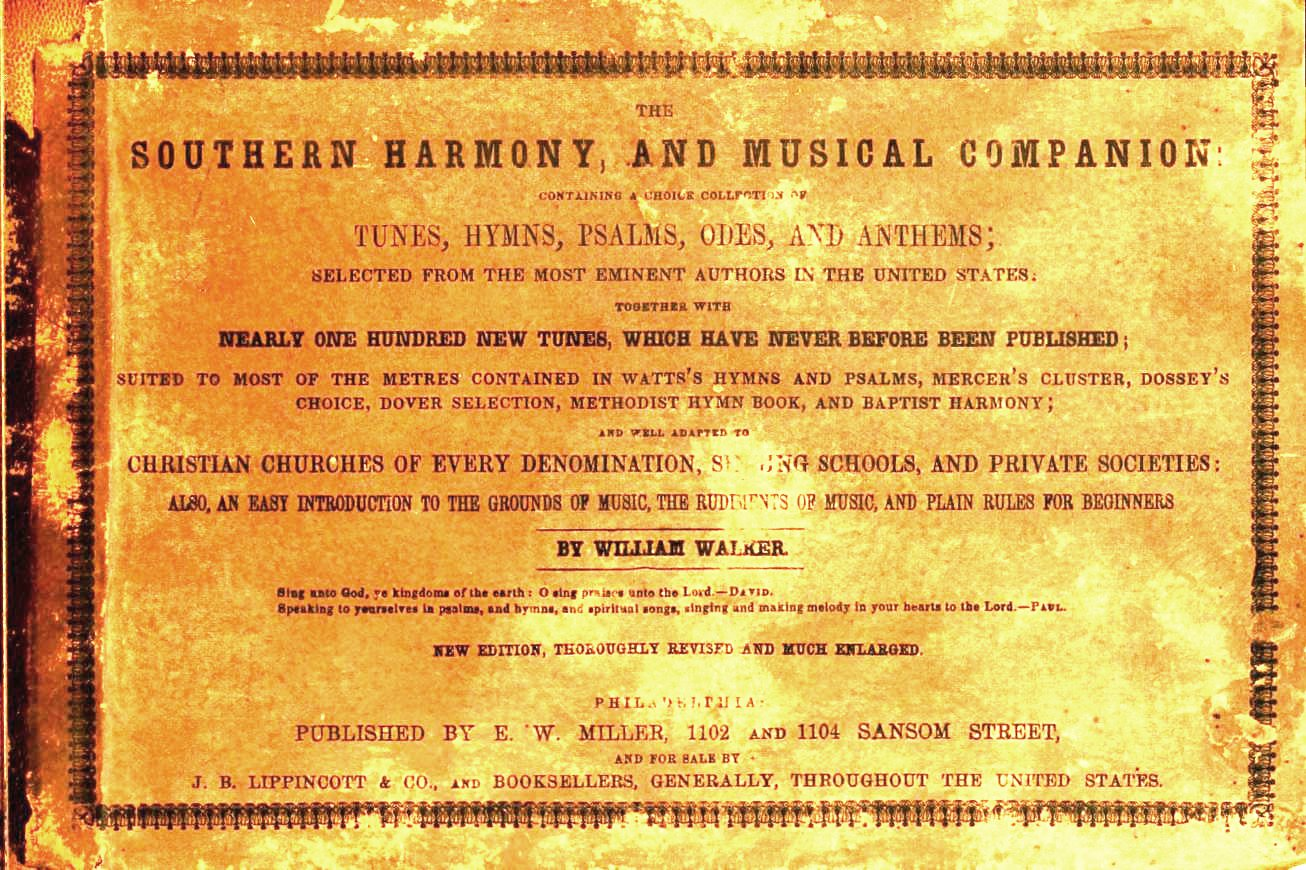
Front cover of The Southern Harmony, and Musical Companion tunebook compiled by William Walker.

The Southern Harmony, and Musical Companion is a shape note hymn and tune book compiled by William Walker, first published in 1835. The book is notable for having originated or popularized several hymn tunes found in modern hymnals and shape note collections like The Sacred Harp.

== The music and its notation ==
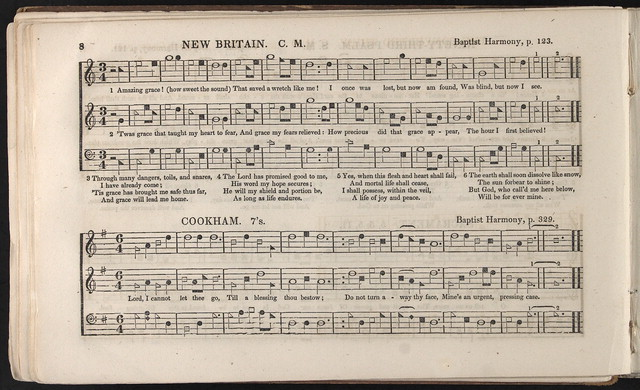
An 1847 publication of Southern Harmony, showing the title "New Britain" ("Amazing Grace") and shape note music.

The roots of Southern Harmony singing, like the Sacred Harp, are found in the American colonial era, when singing schools convened to provide instruction in choral singing, especially for use in church services. This practice remained popular with Baptists in the South long after it fell from use in other regions.

In 1801, a book called The Easy Instructor (Note: The Easy Instructor, Part II (1803) attributes the invention of shape notes to 'J. Conly of Philadelphia'.) by William Smith and William Little was published for the use of this movement; its distinguishing feature was the use of four separate shapes that indicated the notes according to the rules of solfege. A triangle indicated fa, a circle sol, a square la and a diamond, mi. To avoid proliferating shapes excessively, each shape (and its associated syllable) except for mi was assigned to two notes of the musical scale. A major scale in the system would be noted Fa – Sol – La – Fa – Sol – La – Mi – Fa, and a minor scale would be La – Mi – Fa – Sol – La – Fa – Sol – La.

The hymns include "New Britain" ("Amazing Grace"), What Wondrous Love Is This, Promised Land (On Jordan's stormy banks I stand), and Rock of Ages.

== History ==
The Southern Harmony, and Musical Companion was compiled by William "Singin' Billy" Walker and printed in 1835, with subsequent editions printed in Philadelphia. It contained 335 songs, went through several editions, and became one of the most popular southern tunebooks in the 19th century. In 1867 Walker claimed over 600,000 copies had been sold. Walker added an appendix of additional tunes in 1840 with a further enlargement in 1847. An 1854 revision deleted several tunes and added still more. The present edition is a facsimile reprint of the 1854 edition.

In 1866, Walker published a tunebook entitled The Christian Harmony, in which he changed from four shape to seven shape notation. He incorporated over half of the contents of The Southern Harmony in the Christian Harmony. Walker died on September 30, 1887.

The Southern Harmony has remained unchanged since 1854, unlike its counterpart the Sacred Harp, which went through several revisions in the 20th century. About 75% of the songs are presented in three-part harmony.

Besides Walker, notable contributors to Southern Harmony included Matilda T. Durham and John Gill Landrum.

== Related ==
The American composer William Duckworth used some of the songs in the Southern Harmony as a starting point for his own minimalist choral arrangements of the same name.

Composer Donald Grantham also composed a four-movement piece for wind ensemble based on the anthology, entitled Southern Harmony.

The Black Crowes named their second album The Southern Harmony and Musical Companion after this song anthology.

== Bibliography ==
- Loftis, Deborah Carlton (1987), Big Singing Day in Benton, Kentucky: A Study of the History, Ethnic Identity and Musical Style of Southern Harmony Singers (Ph.D. dissertation), University of Kentucky.
- Jackson, George Pullen, Spiritual Folk-songs of Early America.
- ——— (1932), White Spirituals in the Southern Uplands.
- Walker, William (29 September 1993), The Southern Harmony, and Musical Companion, University Press of Kentucky, ISBN 0-8131-1859-X.

See also the bibliographic entries under Shape note.
