= List of shape-note tunebooks =

Shape notes are a system of music notation designed to facilitate choral singing. Shape notes of various kinds have been used for over two centuries in a variety of sacred choral music traditions practiced primarily in the Southern region of the United States.

"Shape-note singers used tune books rather than hymnals. Hymnals were pocket-size books with texts only. Tune books were large oblong-shaped books with hard covers (nine inches by six inches was a typical size), often running to over four hundred pages. They included both music and text and were introduced by an extended essay on the rudiments of singing. Each song was known by the name given to its tune rather than by a title drawn from the text."

The following is a partial list of the shape note tunebooks published over the last two centuries. The list is divided according to the two main systems of shape notes—four-shape vs. seven-shape—and within these two categories is sorted chronologically.

For full information on shape-note tunebooks, including a list of public-domain tunebooks available online, see Shape note.

== Four-shape shape-note tunebooks ==
- The Easy Instructor, William Little & William Smith (1801)
- Repository of Sacred Music, John Wyeth (1810)
- Repository of Sacred Music, Part Second, John Wyeth (1813)
- The Beauties of Harmony, Freeman Lewis (1813)
- Kentucky Harmony, Ananias Davisson (1816)
- Tennessee Harmony, Alexander Johnson (1818)
- The Missouri Harmony, Allen D. Carden (1820) (reprinted 2005)
- Songs of Zion, James P. Carrell (1821)
- Columbian Harmony, William Moore (1825)
- The Virginia Harmony, James P. Carrell and David L. Clayton (1831)
- Genuine Church Music: Harmonia Sacra, Joseph Funk (1832)
- The Southern Harmony, William Walker (1835)
- Union Harmony, William Caldwell (1837)
- The Sacred Harp, B. F. White & Elisha J. King (1844)
- Hesperian Harp, Dr. William Hauser (1848)
- The American Vocalist, D.H. Mansfield (1849) (partially reprinted 2010)
- The Social Harp, John Gordon McCurry (1855)
- The Colored Sacred Harp, Judge Jackson (1934)
- Northern Harmony, Larry Gordon & Anthony G. Barrand (1979; 5th edition 2012)
- An American Christmas Harp, Karen E. Willard. Puyallup, Washington (1994; 3rd ed. 2009)
- An Eclectic Harmony, Eclectic Harmony Music Committee, Liz Bryant, chair. Atlanta, (1999)
- Oberlin Harmony, Chloe Maher and Charles Wells (2002)
- High Desert Harmony, Daniel Davis. Albuquerque, (2004)
- Norumbega Harmony, Stephen A. Marini, Boston, Massachusetts (2004)
- The Christian Harmony, (4-shape edition of Jeremiah Ingalls' 1805 tunebook), Thomas B. Malone self-published, (2005)
- The Georgian Harmony, Raymond C. Hamrick (2010)
- The Shenandoah Harmony, John del Re, Kelly Macklin, Leyland del Re, Myles Louis Dakan, Rachel Wells Hall, Daniel L. Hunter, Nora Miller, and Robert Stoddard Boyce, Virginia (2012)
- The Valley Pocket Harmonist, Daniel L. Hunter, Kelly Macklin, Graham F. DeZarn, John W. del Re, Leyland W. del Re, Cherilyn MacNeil, Joshua Rush Barnett Boyce, Virginia (2024)

== Seven-shape shape-note tunebooks (partial) ==
- The Christian Minstrel, Jesse B. Aiken (1846)
- Harmonia Sacra, Joseph Funk (1851)
- Warren's Minstrel, J. S. Warren (1857)
- Christian Harmony, William Walker (1866)
- The New Harp of Columbia, Marcus Lafayette Swan (1867)
- The Temple Star, Aldine Silliman Kieffer (1877)
- The Olive Leaf, Dr. William Hauser (1878)
- The Good Old Songs, Elder C. H. Cayce (1913)
- Primitive Baptist Hymn and Tune Book, Elder John R. Daily (1918/1952)
- Harp of Ages, Archibald Newton Whitten (1925)
- The Church Hymnal, Herald Press (1926)
- Favorite Songs and Hymns, Morris, Stamps, Baxter, Combs (1939)
- Heavenly Highway Hymns, Stamps-Baxter (1948/1976)
- The Christian Hymnary, The Christian Hymnary Publishers (1972)
- An Eclectic Harmony II, Eclectic Harmony II Music Committee, Sharon Kellam and Berkley Moore, Co-Chairs. Boone, North Carolina, (2001)
- Primitive Baptist Hymnal (Second Edition), Harmony Hill (2004)
