= Hymn =

Religious song for the purpose of adoration or prayer

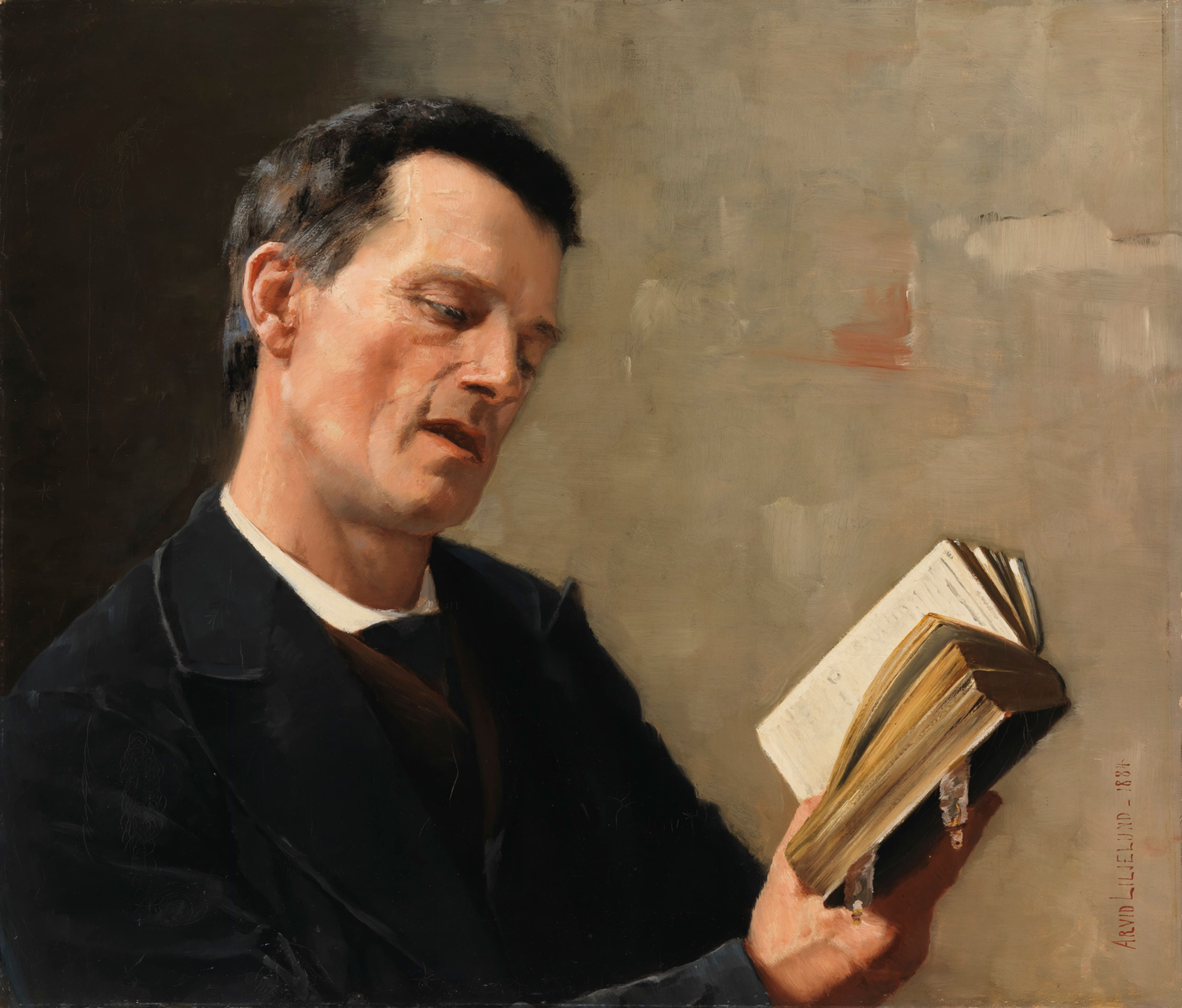
Arvid Liljelund's Man Singing Hymn (1884)

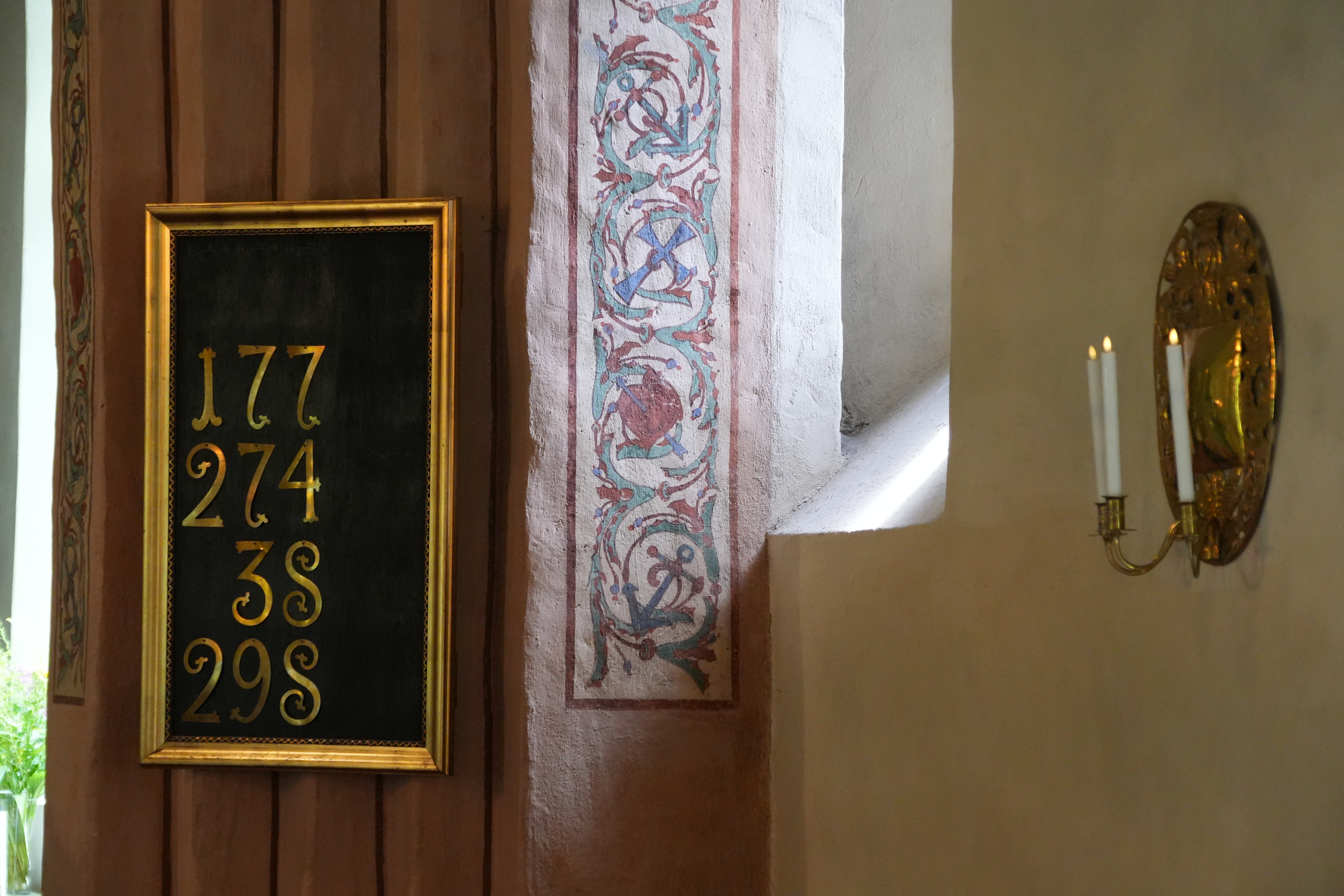
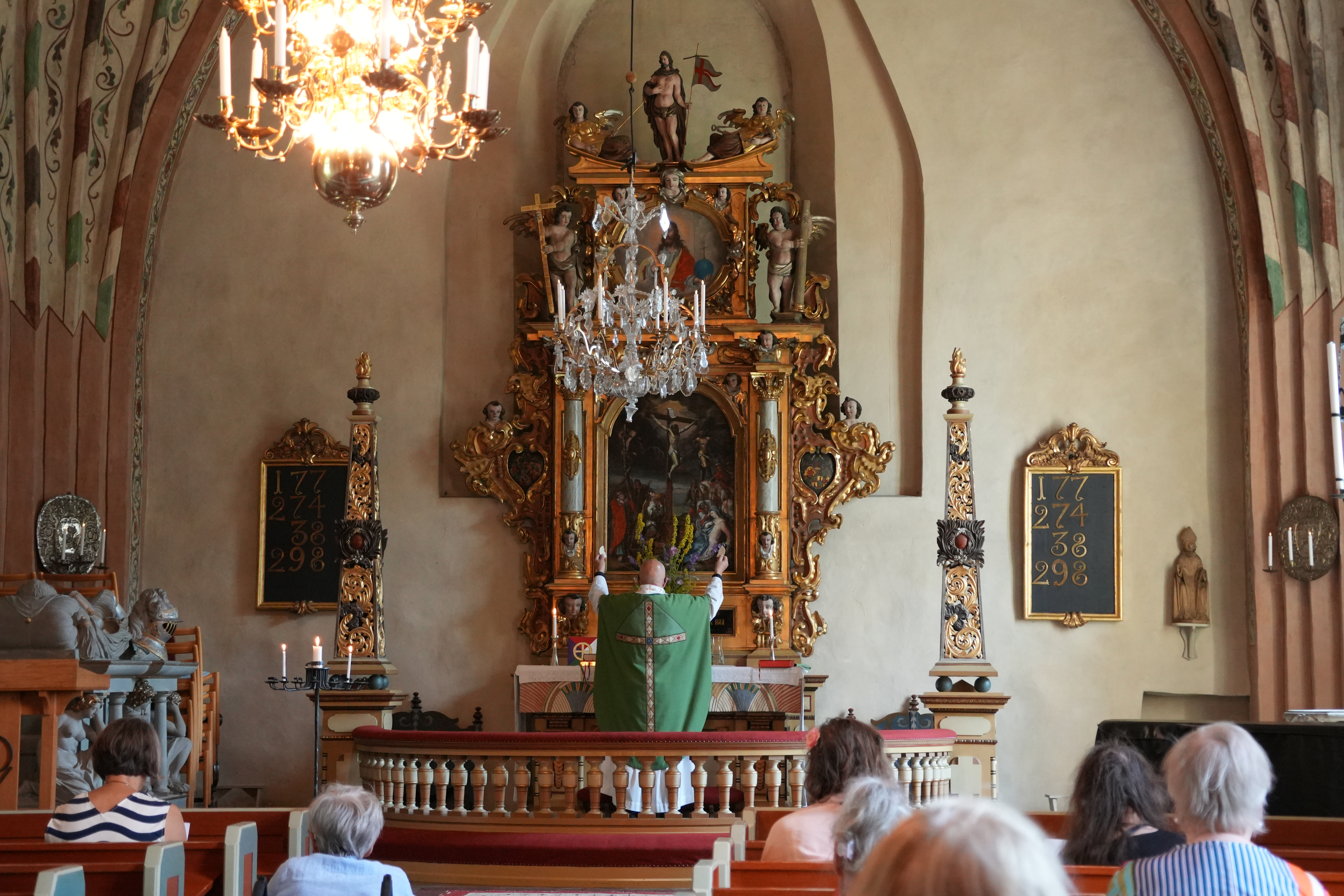
The hymn board visible during the offering of High Mass at Länna Church (Evangelical-Lutheran) in Norrtälje, Sweden

A hymn is a type of song, and partially synonymous with devotional song, specifically written for the purpose of adoration or prayer, and typically addressed to a deity or deities, or to a prominent figure or personification. The word hymn derives from Greek ὕμνος (hymnos), which means "a song of praise". A writer of hymns is known as a hymnist or hymnodist. The singing or composition of hymns is called hymnody. Collections of hymns are known as hymnals or hymn books. Hymns may or may not include instrumental accompaniment. Polyhymnia is the Greek goddess of hymns.

Although most familiar to speakers of English in the context of Christianity, hymns are also a fixture of other world religions, especially on the Indian subcontinent (stotras). Hymns also survive from antiquity, especially from Egyptian and Greek cultures. Some of the oldest surviving examples of notated music are hymns with Greek texts.

== Origins ==
Ancient Eastern hymns include the Sumerian Kesh temple hymn (oldest surviving literary text in the world); Egyptian Great Hymn to the Aten, composed by Pharaoh Akhenaten; the Hurrian Hymn to Nikkal; the Rigveda, an Indian collection of Vedic hymns; hymns from the Classic of Poetry (Shijing), a collection of Chinese poems from 11th to 7th centuries BC; the Gathas—Avestan hymns believed to have been composed by Zoroaster; and the Biblical Book of Psalms.

The Western tradition of hymnody begins with the Homeric Hymns, a collection of ancient Greek hymns, the oldest of which were written in the 7th century BC, praising deities of the ancient Greek religions. Surviving from the 3rd century BC is a collection of six literary hymns (Ὕμνοι) by the Alexandrian poet Callimachus. The Orphic Hymns are a collection of 87 short poems in Greek religion.

Patristic writers began applying the term ὕμνος, or hymnus in Latin, to Christian songs of praise, and frequently used the word as a synonym for "psalm".

== Christian hymnody ==
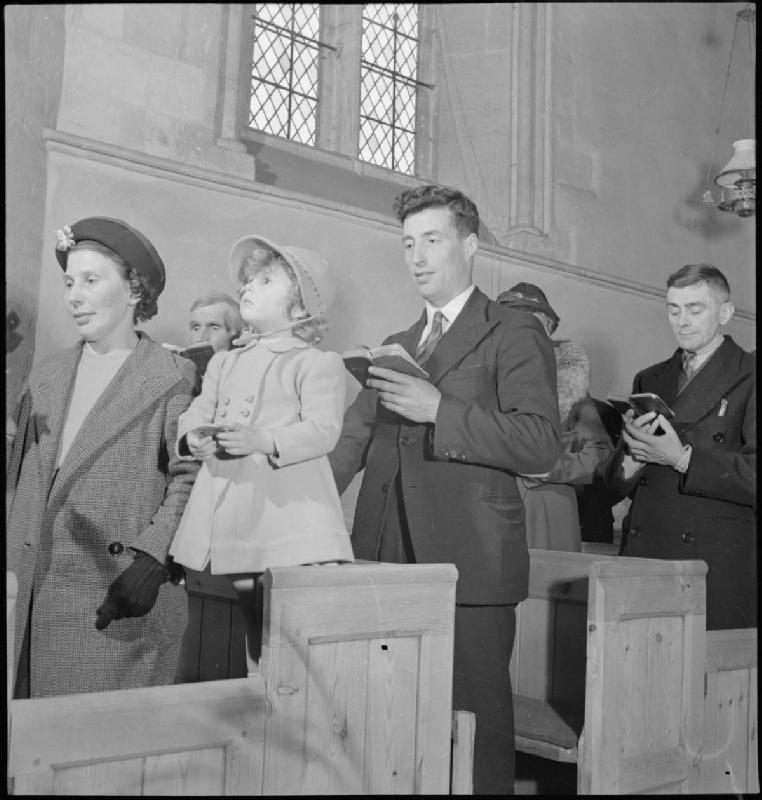
In Christianity, church congregations often sing hymns together as part of their worship (Pictured: worshippers at Uffington Parish Church in England, 1944)

Originally modelled on (but distinct from) the Book of Psalms and other poetic passages (commonly referred to as "canticles") in the Scriptures, Christian hymns are generally directed as praise to the Christian God. Many refer to Jesus Christ either directly or indirectly.

=== Origins ===
In the New Testament, Saint Paul wrote to the Ephesian and Colossian churches, enjoining the singing of psalms and hymns for "mutual encouragement and edification". This was demonstrated when he joined Silas in singing hymns in the Philippian jail, despite the unfortunate circumstances. Psalms 30:4 and Revelation 14:3, among other Scriptural verses, encourage Christians to sing hymns to praise God. As such, since the earliest times, Christians have sung "psalms and hymns and spiritual songs", both in private devotions and in corporate worship. Non-scriptural hymns (i.e. not psalms or canticles) from the Early Church still sung today include 'Phos Hilaron', 'Sub tuum praesidium', and 'Te Deum'.

=== Traditions ===
The hymn 'Te Deum' is sung or recited in the Liturgy of the Hours and in thanksgiving to God for a special blessing (such as the election of a pope, the consecration of a bishop, the canonization of a saint), and on 31 December to thank the Lord for the past year.

The hymn "Gloria in excelsis Deo" is sung or recited at Mass, after the Kyrie, on Sundays outside of Lent and Advent, on Christmas, during the octaves of Easter and Christmas, and on solemnities and feasts.

=== Definition ===
One definition of a hymn is "...a lyric poem, reverently and devotionally conceived, which is designed to be sung and which expresses the worshipper's attitude toward God or God's purposes in human life. It should be simple and metrical in form, genuinely emotional, poetic and literary in style, spiritual in quality, and in its ideas so direct and so immediately apparent as to unify a congregation while singing it."

=== Special occasions ===
Christian hymns are often written with special or seasonal themes; such hymns are used on holy days such as Christmas, Easter and the Feast of All Saints, or during particular seasons such as Advent and Lent. Others are used to encourage reverence for the Bible or to celebrate Christian practices such as the Eucharist or Baptism. Some hymns praise or address individual saints, particularly Mary, mother of Jesus; such hymns are particularly prevalent in Catholicism, Eastern Orthodoxy, Evangelical Lutheranism, and to some extent in High Church Anglicanism.

=== Terminology ===
A writer of hymns is known as a hymnodist, and the practice of singing hymns is called hymnody; the same word is used collectively for those hymns associated with a particular denomination or period (e.g. "nineteenth-century Methodist hymnody" would mean the body of hymns written and/or used by Methodists in the 19th century). A specific collection of hymns is called a hymnal, hymn book or hymnary. These may or may not include music; among hymnals without printed music, some include names of hymn tunes suggested for use with each text, in case readers already know the tunes or would like to find them elsewhere. A student of hymnody is called a hymnologist, and the scholarly study of hymns, hymnists and hymnody is hymnology. The music to which a hymn may be sung is a hymn tune.

Nondenominational evangelical churches may classify traditional songs as hymns, while more contemporary worship songs are not considered hymns. The reason for this distinction is unclear, but according to some it is due to the radical shift of style and devotional thinking that began in the late 1960s with the Jesus movement and Jesus music. In recent years, Christian traditional hymns have seen a revival in some churches, usually more Reformed or Calvinistic in nature, as modern hymn-writers such as Keith & Kristyn Getty and Sovereign Grace Music have reset old lyrics to new melodies, revised old hymns and republished them, or simply written a song in a hymn-like fashion such as "In Christ Alone".

=== Music and accompaniment ===
In ancient and medieval times, string instruments such as the harp, lyre and lute were used with psalms and hymns.

Since there is a lack of musical notation in early writings, the actual musical forms in the early church can only be surmised. During the Middle Ages a rich hymnody developed in the form of Gregorian chant or plainsong. This type was sung in unison, in one of eight church modes, and most often by monastic choirs. While they were written originally in Latin, many have been translated; a familiar example is the 4th century Of the Father's Heart Begotten sung to the 11th-century plainsong Divinum Mysterium.

==== Western church ====
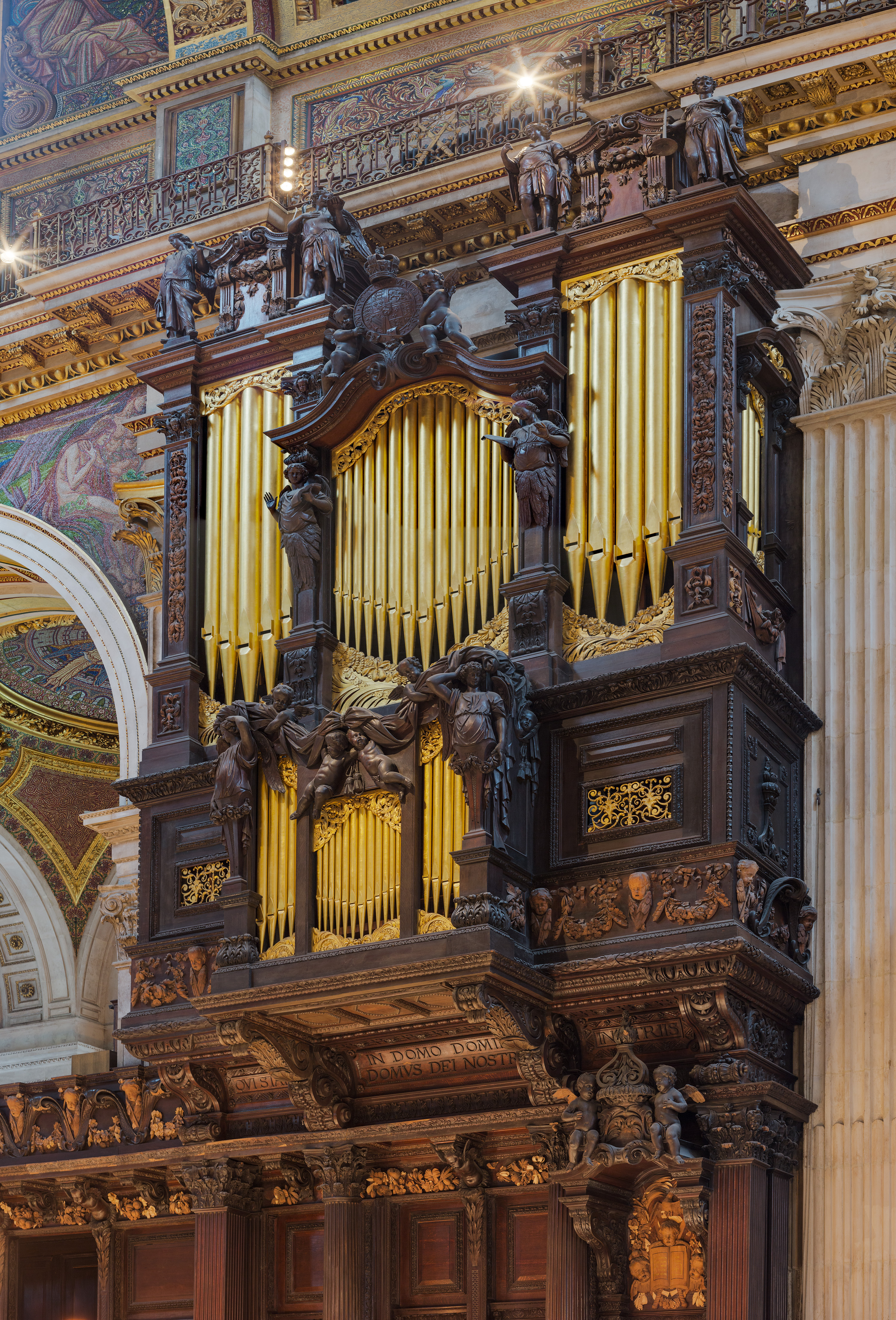
Hymns are often accompanied by organ music

Later hymnody in the Western church introduced four-part vocal harmony as the norm, adopting major and minor keys. The organ and choir came to lead the singing. Western hymnody shares many elements with classical music.

Today, except for choirs, more musically inclined congregations, and a cappella congregations, hymns are typically sung in unison. In some cases, complementary full settings for organ are also published; in others, organists and other accompanists are expected to adapt the available setting, or extemporise one, on their instrument of choice.

In traditional Evangelical Lutheran and Anglican practice, hymns are sung (often accompanied by an organ) during the processional to the altar, during the receiving of communion, during the recessional, and sometimes at other points during the service. The Doxology is also sung after tithes and offerings are brought up to the altar.

Contemporary Christian worship, as commonly found in certain forms of Evangelicalism and Pentecostalism, may include the use of contemporary worship music played with electric guitars and drum kits, sharing many elements with rock music.

Other groups of Christians have historically excluded instrumental accompaniment, citing the absence of instruments in worship by the church in the first several centuries of its existence, and adhere to an unaccompanied a cappella congregational singing of hymns. These groups include the Brethren (often both Open and Exclusive), the Churches of Christ, Mennonites, several Anabaptist-based denominations—such as the Apostolic Christian Church of America—Primitive Baptists, and certain Reformed churches. However, during the last century or so, several of these groups, such as the Free Church of Scotland, have abandoned this stance.

==== Eastern church ====
Thou Art a Vineyard
Shen Khar Venakhi – medieval Georgian Orthodox Christian hymn

Eastern Christianity (the Eastern Orthodox, Oriental Orthodox, Eastern Lutheran and Eastern Catholic churches) has a variety of ancient hymnographical traditions. In the Byzantine Rite, chant is used for all forms of liturgical worship: if it is not sung a cappella, the only accompaniment is usually an ison, or drone. Organs and other instruments were excluded from church use, although they were employed in imperial ceremonies. However, instruments are common in some other Oriental traditions. The Coptic tradition makes use of the cymbals and the triangle only. The Indian Orthodox (Malankara Orthodox Syrian Church) use the organ. The Tewahedo Churches use drums, cymbals and other instruments on certain occasions.

=== Development of Christian hymnody ===
Thomas Aquinas, in the introduction to his commentary on the Psalms, defined the Christian hymn thus: "Hymnus est laus Dei cum cantico; canticum autem exultatio mentis de aeternis habita, prorumpens in vocem." ("A hymn is the praise of God with song; a song is the exultation of the mind dwelling on eternal things, bursting forth in the voice.")

The Protestant Reformation resulted in two conflicting attitudes towards hymns. One approach, the regulative principle of worship, favoured by many Zwinglians, Calvinists and some radical reformers, regarded anything that was not directly authorised by the Bible as a novel and Catholic introduction to worship, which was to be rejected. All hymns that were not direct quotations from the Bible fell into this category. Such hymns were banned, along with any form of instrumental musical accompaniment, and organs were removed from Reformed churches. Instead of hymns, biblical psalms were chanted, most often without accompaniment, to very basic melodies. This was known as exclusive psalmody. Examples of this may still be found in various places, including in some of the Presbyterian churches of western Scotland.

Ein feste Burg ist unser Gott
Luther's paraphrase of Psalm 46, a popular Lutheran hymn

The other Reformation approach, the normative principle of worship, produced a burst of hymn-writing and congregational singing. Martin Luther is notable not only as a reformer, but as the author of hymns including Ein feste Burg ist unser Gott ("A Mighty Fortress Is Our God"), Gelobet seist du, Jesu Christ ("Praise be to You, Jesus Christ"), and many others. Luther and his followers often used their hymns, or chorales, to teach tenets of the faith to worshipers. The first Protestant hymnal was published in Bohemia in 1532 by the Unitas Fratrum.

Count Zinzendorf, a Lutheran bishop of the Moravian Church in the 18th century, wrote some 2,000 hymns.

Some of the works of the Anglican "metaphysical poet" the Reverend George Herbert (1593–1633) have found their way into hymnals.

The earlier English writers tended to paraphrase biblical texts, particularly Psalms; Isaac Watts (1674–1748) followed this tradition, but is also credited as having written the first English hymn which was not a direct paraphrase of Scripture. Watts, whose father was an Elder of a dissenter congregation, complained at age 16, that when allowed only psalms to sing, the faithful could not even sing about their Lord, Christ Jesus. His father invited him to see what he could do about it; the result was Watts' first hymn, "Behold the glories of the Lamb". Found in few hymnals today, the hymn has eight stanzas in common metre and is based on Revelation 5:6, 8, 9, 10, 12.

Relying heavily on Scripture, Watts wrote metered texts based on New Testament passages that brought the Christian faith into the songs of the church. Isaac Watts has been called "the father of English hymnody", but Erik Routley sees him more as "the liberator of English hymnody", because his hymns, and hymns like them, moved worshippers beyond singing only Old Testament psalms, inspiring congregations and revitalizing worship.

Later writers took even more freedom, with some even including allegory and metaphor in their texts.

"Love Divine All Loves Excelling"
"Love Divine, All Loves Excelling", one of Charles Wesley's most popular hymns, is commonly sung to the tune Blaenwern composed by W.P.Rowlands.

Charles Wesley's hymns spread Methodist theology, not only within Methodism, but in most Protestant churches. He developed a new focus: expressing one's personal feelings in the relationship with God as well as the simple worship seen in older hymns.

Battle Hymn of the Republic
The Battle Hymn of the Republic, performed by Frank C. Stanley, Elise Stevenson, and a mixed quartet in 1908.

Wesley's contribution, along with the Second Great Awakening in America, led to a new style called "gospel", and a new explosion of sacred-music writing with Fanny Crosby, Lina Sandell, Philip Bliss, Ira D. Sankey, and others who produced testimonial music for revivals, camp-meetings, and evangelistic crusades. The tune style or form is technically designated "gospel songs" as distinct from hymns. Gospel songs generally include a refrain (or chorus) and usually (though not always) a faster tempo than with hymns. As examples of the distinction, "Amazing Grace" is a hymn (no refrain), but "How Great Thou Art" is a gospel song. During the 19th century, the gospel-song genre spread rapidly in Protestantism and — to a lesser but still definite extent — in Roman Catholicism; the gospel-song genre is unknown in the worship per se by Eastern Orthodox churches, which rely exclusively on traditional chants (a type of hymn).

The Methodist Revival of the 18th century created an explosion of hymn-writing in Welsh, which continued into the first half of the 19th century. The most prominent Welsh hymn-writers are William Williams Pantycelyn and Ann Griffiths. The second half of the 19th century witnessed an explosion of hymn-tune composition and congregational four-part singing in Wales.

Along with the more classical sacred music of composers ranging from Charpentier (19 Hymns, H.53 - H.71) to Mozart and Monteverdi, the Catholic Church continued to produce many popular hymns such as "Lead, Kindly Light", "Silent Night", "O Sacrament Most Holy", and "Faith of Our Fathers".

In some radical Protestant movements, their own sacred hymns completely replaced the written Bible. An example of this, the Book of Life (Russian: "Zhivotnaya kniga") is the name of all oral hymns of the Doukhobors, the Russian denomination, similar to western Quakers. The Book of Life of the Doukhobors (1909) is firstly printed hymnal containing songs which have been composed as an oral piece to be sung aloud.

Many churches today use contemporary-worship music which includes a range of styles often influenced by popular music. This often leads to some conflict between older and younger congregants (see contemporary worship). This is not new; the Christian pop-music style began in the late 1960s and became very popular during the 1970s, as young hymnists sought ways in which to make the music of their religion relevant for their generation.

This long tradition has resulted in a wide variety of hymns. Some modern churches include within hymnody the traditional hymn (usually describing God), contemporary-worship music (often directed to God) and gospel music (expressions of one's personal experience of God). This distinction is not perfectly clear; and purists remove the second two types from classification as hymns. It is a matter of debate, even sometimes within a single congregation, often between revivalist and traditionalist movements.

Swedish composer and musicologist Elisabet Wentz-Janacek mapped 20,000 melody variants for Swedish hymns and helped create the Swedish Choral Registrar, which displays the wide variety of hymns today.

In modern times, hymn use has not been limited to strictly religious settings, including secular occasions such as Remembrance Day, and this "secularization" also includes use as sources of musical entertainment or even vehicles for mass emotion.

==== American developments ====
Hymn-writing, composition, performance and the publishing of Christian hymnals throve in the 19th century, and many hymn-writers often linked this activity to the abolitionist movement. Stephen Foster wrote a number of hymns that were used during church services during this era of publishing.

Thomas Symmes, a clergyman of the third generation of Puritans in New England, spread throughout churches a new idea of how to sing hymns, in which anyone could sing a hymn any way they felt led to; this idea was opposed by a writer of the time, Rev. Thomas Walter, who felt it was "like Five Hundred different Tunes roared out at the same time". William Billings, a singing-school teacher, created the first tune-book with only American-born compositions. Within his books, Billings did not put as much emphasis on "common measure" - a quatrain that rhymes ABAB and alternates four-stress and three-stress iambic lines - which was the typical way hymns were sung. Noting in his preface the fondness of other compilers for tunes in common measure, Billings promised his subscribers a well-balanced collection, with "a Sufficiency in each measure". And indeed The Singing Master's Assistant has many tunes whose declamation is based on the dactyl in duple time. Boston's Handel and Haydn Society aimed at raising the level of church music in America, publishing their "Collection of Church Music" in 1822. In the late-19th century Ira D. Sankey and Dwight L. Moody developed the relatively new subcategory of gospel hymns.

Earlier in the 19th century, the use of musical notation, especially shape notes, exploded in America, and professional singing-masters went from town to town teaching the population how to sing from sight, instead of the more common lining out that had been used before that. During this period hundreds of tune-books were published, including B.F. White's Sacred Harp, and earlier works like the Missouri Harmony, Kentucky Harmony, Hesperian Harp, D.H. Mansfield's The American Vocalist, The Social Harp, the Southern Harmony, William Walker's Christian Harmony, Jeremiah Ingalls' Christian Harmony, and literally many dozens of others. Shape-notes were important in the spread of (then) more-modern singing-styles, with tenor-led 4-part harmony (based on older English West Gallery music), fuging sections, anthems and other more complex features. During this period, hymns were incredibly popular in the United States, and one or more of the above-mentioned tune-books could be found in almost every household. It is not uncommon to hear accounts of young people and teenagers gathering together to spend an afternoon singing hymns and anthems from tune-books, which was considered great fun, and accounts survive of Abraham Lincoln and his sweetheart singing together from the Missouri Harmony during his youth.

By the 1860s musical reformers like Lowell Mason (the so-called "better music boys") were actively campaigning for the introduction of more "refined" and modern singing-styles, and eventually American tune-books were replaced in many churches, starting in the Northeast and urban areas, and spreading out into the countryside as people adopted the gentler, more soothing tones of Victorian hymnody, and even adopted dedicated, trained choirs to do their church's singing, rather than having the entire congregation participate. But in many rural areas the old traditions lived on, not in churches, but in weekly, monthly or annual conventions were people would meet to sing from their favorite tune-books. The most popular one, and the only one that survived continuously in print, was the Sacred Harp, which could be found in the typical rural Southern home right up until the living tradition was "re-discovered" by Alan Lomax in the 1960s (although it had been well-documented by musicologist George Pullen Jackson prior to this). Since then there has been a renaissance in "Sacred Harp singing", with annual conventions popping up in all 50 states and in a number of European countries recently, including the UK, Germany, Ireland and Poland, as well as in Australia.

===== African-American influence =====
African-Americans developed a rich hymnody — from spirituals during times of slavery to the modern, lively black-gospel style. The first influences of African-American culture into hymns came from the collection Slave Songs of the United States, compiled by William Francis Allen, despite difficulties pinning them down from the oral tradition. He points out the awe-inspiring effect of the hymns when sung by their originators. Some of the first hymns in the black church were renderings of Isaac Watts hymns written in the African-American vernacular English of the time.

=== Hymn meters ===
The meter indicates the number of syllables for the lines in each stanza of a hymn. This provides a means of marrying the hymn's text with an appropriate hymn tune for singing. In practice many hymns conform to one of a relatively small number of meters (syllable-count and stress-patterns). Care must be taken, however, to ensure that not only the metre of words and tune match, but also the stresses on the words in each line. Technically speaking, an iambic tune, for instance, cannot be used with words of, say, trochaic metre.

The meter is often denoted by a row of figures besides the name of the tune, such as "87.87.87", which would inform the reader that each verse has six lines, and that the first line has eight syllables, the second has seven, the third line eight, etc. The meter can also be described by initials; "L.M." indicates long meter, which is 88.88 (four lines, each eight syllables long); "S.M." is short meter (66.86); "C.M." is common metre (86.86), while "D.L.M.", "D.S.M." and "D.C.M." (the "D" stands for double) are similar to their respective single meters except that they have eight lines in a verse instead of four.

Also, if the number of syllables in one verse differ from another verse in the same hymn (e.g., the hymn "I Sing a Song of the Saints of God"), the meter is called "Irregular".

== Hindu hymnody ==
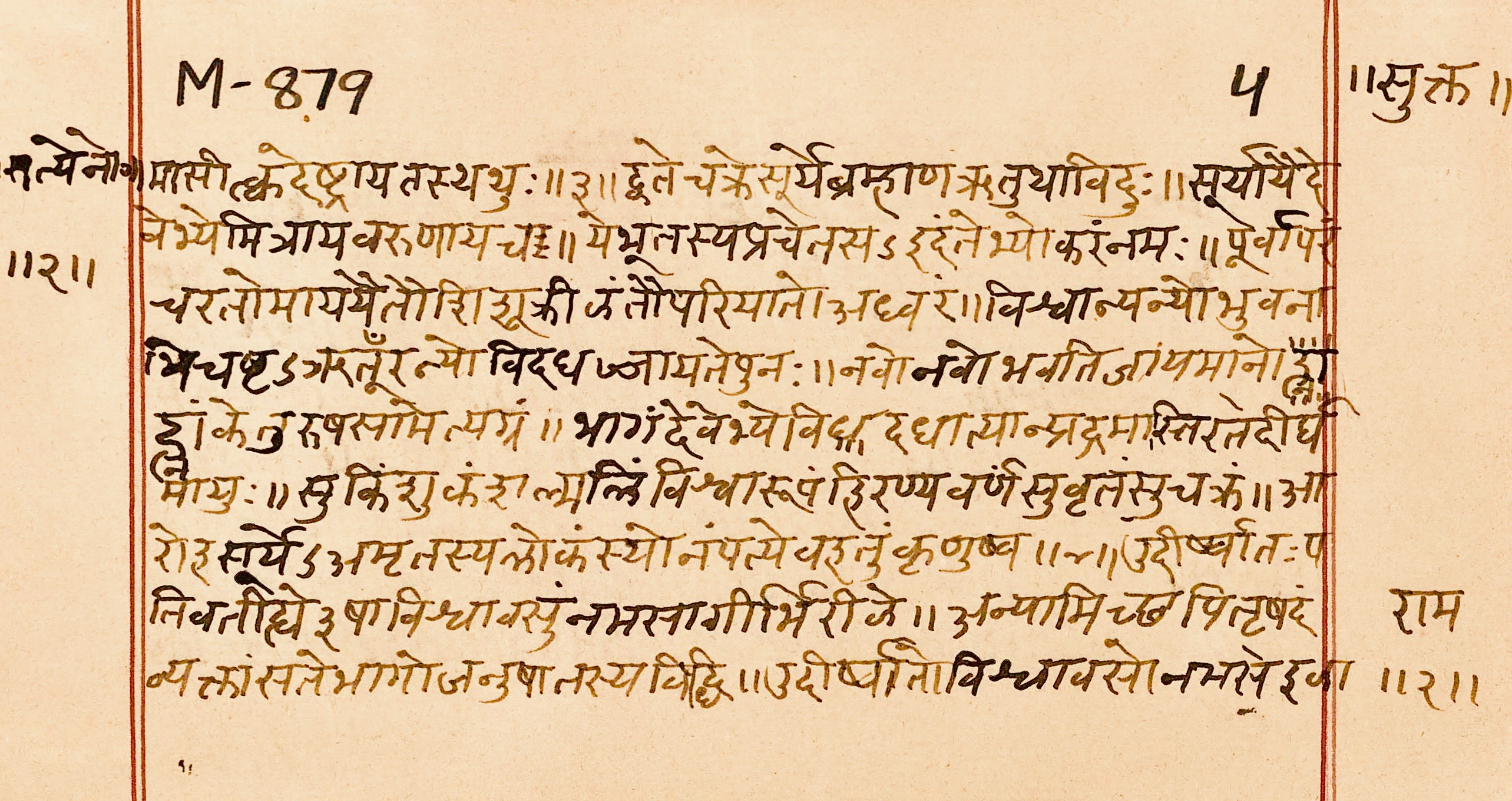
Sanskrit manuscript page from the "Vivaha sukta" Rigveda, dated 1500–1200 BCE

Gāram melody of the Acchavākaśastram from the Sāma-Veda
Recitation of a Gaaram melody of a mantra from the Samaveda

The Rigveda is the earliest and foundational Indian collection of over a thousand liturgical hymns in Vedic Sanskrit.

Between other notable Hindu hymns (stotras and others) or their collections there are:

- Naalayira Divya Prabandham
- Ram Raksha Stotra
- Saundarya Lahari
- Shiva Stuti
- Shiva Tandava Stotram
- Tirumurai
- Vayu Stuti

A hymnody acquired tremendous importance during the medieval era of the bhakti movements. When the chanting (bhajan and kirtan) of the devotional songs of the poet-sants (Basava, Chandidas, Dadu Dayal, Haridas, Hith Harivansh, Kabir, Meera Bai, Namdev, Nanak, Ramprasad Sen, Ravidas, Sankardev, Surdas, Vidyapati) in local languages in a number of groups, namely Dadu panth, Kabir panth, Lingayatism, Radha-vallabha, Sikhism, completely or significantly replaced all previous Sanskrit literature. The same and with the songs of Baul movement. That is, the new hymns themselves received the status of holy scripture. An example of a hymnist, both lyricist and composer is the 15th–16th centuries Assamese reformer guru Sankardev with his borgeet-songs.

== Sikh hymnody ==
The Sikh holy book, the Guru Granth Sahib (Punjabi: ਗੁਰੂ ਗ੍ਰੰਥ ਸਾਹਿਬ Punjabi pronunciation: [ɡʊɾu ɡɾəntʰ sɑhɪb]), is a collection of hymns (Shabad) or Gurbani describing the qualities of God and why one should meditate on God's name. The Guru Granth Sahib is divided by their musical setting in different ragas into fourteen hundred and thirty pages known as Angs (limbs) in Sikh tradition. Guru Gobind Singh (1666–1708), the tenth guru, after adding Guru Tegh Bahadur's bani to the Adi Granth affirmed the sacred text as his successor, elevating it to Guru Granth Sahib. The text remains the holy scripture of the Sikhs, regarded as the teachings of the Ten Gurus. The role of Guru Granth Sahib, as a source or guide of prayer, is pivotal in Sikh worship.

== In other religions ==
=== Buddhism ===
Sutra chanting is a religious action recommended for Shin Buddhist followers to carry out in their daily lives. Temple service chanting may include: dedications to the Three Treasures (Buddha, Dharma, Sangha) common to all Buddhist traditions; selections from The Three Pure Land Sutras, which record the teachings of the Buddha; compositions of Pure Land Buddhist teachers such as Nagarjuna and Shandao.

Stotras are Sanskrit hymns or eulogies sung in praise of the divine and the transcendent. Usually associated with the Hindu and Jain traditions, stotras are melodic expressions of devotion and inspiration found in other Sanskrit religious movements as well.

In the Buddhist world, the practice of singing these hymns is still alive today in Nepal. Min Bahadur Shakya, former director of the Nagarjuna Institute of Exact Methods in Lalitpur, Nepal, writes:

In prosperity or distress, the Nepalese people worship and pray to the Buddhas and Bodhisattvas for protection, good health, prosperity, and family welfare and also for liberation from cyclic existence. The stotras or hymns throw light on various aspects of Buddhist doctrines. The stotras are sung by sadhakas during their meditation or act of devotion. The contents of these strotras are of varied nature ranging from simple act of confession, qualities of Buddhas and Bodhisattvas, praises of deities of both mundane and supra-mundane [nature], iconographic data of various tantric deities and also explanation of Buddha's teachings themselves in the form of verses. These stotras can be sung with melodious music and can imprint the devotees significantly even in this modern world through the multimedia device.

— Min Bahadur Shakya

=== Confucianism ===
The earliest entries in the oldest extant collection of Chinese poetry, the Classic of Poetry (Shijing), were initially lyrics. The Shijing, with its collection of poems and folk songs, was heavily valued by the philosopher Confucius and is considered to be one of the official Confucian classics. His remarks on the subject have become an invaluable source in ancient music theory.

=== Islam ===
During the time of the Prophet Mohammed, Islamic music was originally defined by what it didn't contain: no strings, brass, or wind instruments and no female vocals. The only instrument initially allowed was minimal percussion by an Arabic drum called the daf. This minimal form remains widely practiced in the Gulf and some other parts of the Arab world.

However, in places such as Turkey and Southeast Asia, several new styles of spiritual songs have developed. In Turkey, Sufi adherents incorporate music into worship. The most popular are services undertaken by Mevlevi Sufis, which include chanting and the whirling dervishes.

In Pakistan and Southeast Asia, the most recognized form of devotional music is qawwali. Performed by up to nine men, a qawwali group would often use instruments such as the harmonium (a type of keyboard) and percussion instruments including a tabla and dholak. The songs often run from 15 to 30 minutes and include instrumental preludes, repeated refrains and vocal improvisation. In recent times, nasheed artists from the Gulf have found innovative ways to overcome the no-instrument rule.

Albums by Sharjah's Ahmed Bukhatir and Kuwait's Mishary Rashid Al Afasy use studio trickery and manipulate backing vocals to sound like a synth piano or string section. In the West, groups such as America's Native Deen and Australia's The Brothahood use hip-hop music to get their spiritual message across to a new generation of young Muslims. The nasheeds in English by South Africa's Zain Bhikha secured him a large following in Europe and the Middle East.

=== Jainism ===
Known as stavan or, in Hindi, bhajan, Jain hymns are composed and performed to praise the Jinas. Written in every language Jains have used, the predominant pada form reflects Jain involvement in Indian poetics and in the bhakti devotional movement more commonly associated with Hinduism.

Musically, Jain hymns can be grouped into the folk genres of devotional music in western India, such as Gujarāti rās-garbā and Rājasthāni folk music.

There are six obligatory acts that are expected to be performed by Jains sequentially as a single act twice daily. The second one of these is showing reverence to the ford-makers, which is done by reciting a twenty-four-verse hymn of praise to the Tirthankaras.

One of the most popular devotional hymns of the Jains is the Bhaktāmara-stotra – Devoted Gods hymn. Both main sects of Śvetāmbaras and Digambaras accept it, counting 44 and 48 stanzas respectively. It is dedicated to the first Jina, Ṛṣabhanātha or Lord Ṛṣabha, frequently known as Ādinātha, meaning 'First Lord'. The title comes from the first verse, which says that 'his feet enhance the lustre of the jewels set in the crowns lowered by the devoted gods'.

=== Judaism ===
The Hebrew word Zemirot means literally 'songs' or 'hymns' but is used to refer to two specific repertories: The first, according to the Sephardic tradition, refers to the preliminary section of psalms and biblical verses recited during the Shacharit (morning) prayers: the Ashkenazic terminology refers to these Psalms as Psukeydezimra. The second repertory is well defined in Neil Levin's Overview of his Z'mirot Anthology.

In Ashkenazic tradition the term refers to z'mirot shel Shabbat (Sabbath hymns) translated variously as table songs, domestic songs and home songs. These are a specific set of religious poems in Hebrew or Aramaic written mostly between the 10th and 17th centuries, which are sung during and directly after Sabbath meals. The musical versions are numerous and heterogeneous reflecting a wealth of different styles and geographic origins, and comprising an ever expanding body of folk material.

— Neil Levin

Over many centuries the Jews of Spain and Portugal–the original Sephardim– developed their own form of religious worship. Their services were enhanced by the addition of poetry for special occasions such as the major festivals (Shalosh r'galim) and the Yamim nora'im (High Holidays). Most of these poetic insertions are rhymed, metrical hymns (piyyutim) and were the products of great literary figures during the Golden Age of the Jews in Spain (c. 950–1150). Among these were Solomon ibn Gabriol, Judah Halevi and the two Ibn Ezras—Abraham and Moshe.

One of the main features of devotional music and hymns in Judaism, especially when utilized in synagogue ritual on the Sabbath and other holy days, is that it is almost entirely vocal. Though today, accompanying instruments such as the organ might be utilized in worship, the emphasis on congregational song and the art of the Hazzan has always been, and still is, paramount.

The one salient exception to this is an instrument called the Shofar, a ram's horn which is sounded on the High Holidays (the Jewish New Year and Day of Atonement - Rosh Hashana and Yom Kippur, respectively), as a special call to prayer and repentance.

=== Shinto ===
According to Japanese mythology, Shinto music stems from the time of the gods when there was no earth and sea. In Shintoism, sacral music is called Mi-kagura. The word kagura means "the gods' delight". The prefix "Mi" raises the value of the subject intensely. It should be translated "the sublime greatest of great gods". In praxis there are two kinds of kagura, Mi-kagura and rural kagura. Mi-kagura is strictly reserved and dedicated to the Imperial house and the highest nobility and clergy; rural kagura is a most colourful and vivid presentation of the popular feats of supramortal and mortal heroes.

=== Yazidism ===
The most authoritative sacred texts of Yazidism are hymns called qewls, composed mostly in Kurmanji. The corpus is large and covers the creation of the world, the nature of God, ethics, the fate of the soul after death, and the lives of holy figures. Yazidism has no single written scripture, as such, the qewls fill that role. Trained reciters memorise them word for word and perform them from memory, many to melodies of their own. Performance of Qewls is also sometimes accompanied by the def (frame drum) and shibab (flute).

=== Zoroastrianism ===
The sacred songs attributed to Zoroaster (Zarathustra), the poet-priest and founder of Zoroastrianism, are called Gathas. The Gathas, consist of seventeen hymns composed by the great poet-prophet Zarathushtra around 1200 BC. They are arranged into five groups based on their meter:

- Ahunavaiti Gatha (Y28 - Y34)
- Ushtavaiti Gatha (Y43 - Y46)
- Spentamainyush Gatha (Y47 - Y50)
- Vohukhshathra Gatha (Y51)
- Vahishtoishti Gatha (Y53)

The Gathas are also filled with word plays and deliberate ambiguities, and they were likely intended to be used by initiates as meditative instruments to enlightenment. Only occasionally do the Gathas give an exact and clear picture of Zoroaster's actual teachings, but in general they reflect them in a modified and elaborated form, many times marked by complexity and ornateness of style, the prophet demonstrating his poetical skill in order to stimulate Ahura Mazdā to fulfil his requests or to answer his questions.

== Appreciations ==
According to Nissim Ezekiel, views on hymns can be divided:

...poets who have mystical experiences and project them in verse have occasionally been successful but mystics who write poetry do it badly. Religious hymns, however notable the religious sentiment they express are not notably poetic. Great religious poetry undoubtedly exists but the greatness is unequally divided between the poetry and religion, while perfect integration between the two is rare.

== See also ==
- Anthem
- Carol
- Chorale
- List of Chinese hymn books
- List of English-language hymnals by denomination
- List of hymns by Martin Luther
- Metrical psalter
- Sacred Harp
