= Eliakim Doolittle =

American composer and teacher (1772–1850)

- Born: August 29, 1772; Cheshire, Connecticut
- Died: April 1850 (age 77); Argyle, New York
- Occupations: Composer, schoolteacher, singing teacher
- Known for: "Exhortation" (hymn tune)
- Spouse: Hasadiah Fuller (m. 1811)
- Children: 6
- Relatives: Amos Doolittle (brother); Reuben Munson (cousin); Amos Munson (cousin); James R. Doolittle (nephew)

Eliakim Doolittle (August 29, 1772 – April 1850) was an American composer, schoolteacher, and singing teacher, the younger brother of Amos Doolittle, first cousin of composers Reuben Munson and Amos Munson, and uncle of senator James R. Doolittle. His most well-known composition was the hymn tune "Exhortation", a fuging tune that was first printed in The Musical Harmonist (Jenks 1800) and later included in The Sacred Harp.

== Biography ==
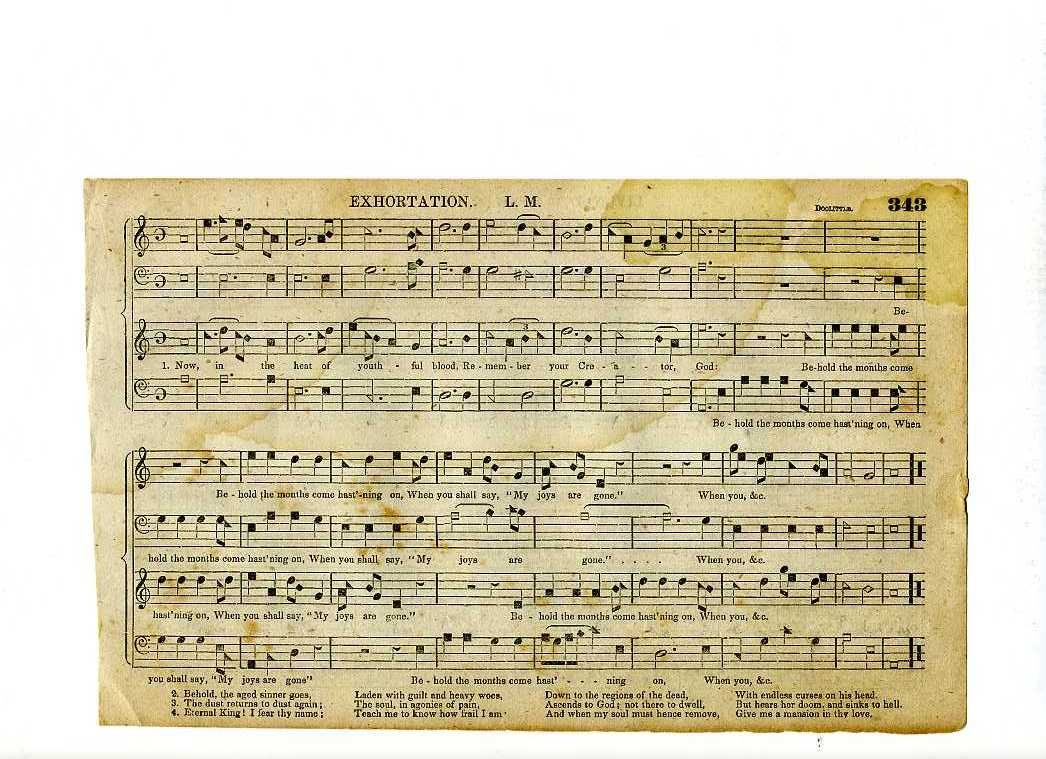
"Exhortation" as published in shape note form in William Hauser's The Hesperian Harp. "L.M." means long metre. The words here are by Isaac Watts.

Born in Cheshire, Connecticut, the son of Ambrose Doolittle and Martha Munson, he attended Yale University (then Yale College), gaining the reputation as a composer, but did not graduate, and became a school- and singing- teacher. He married Hasadiah Fuller in 1811, with whom he had six children (one son and five daughters), and lived in Hampton, New York.

His Psalm Singer's Companion (Doolittle 1806) was 41 compositions (covering 48 pages) of psalm music for four voices, out of a total of 45 works that he composed.

Such works included Solemnity, another hymn tune published in Asahel Benham's Social Harmony in 1798, and the war song The Hornet Stung The Peacock that celebrated the 1813 sinking of HMS Peacock.

Later in life Doolittle suffered from what is now understood to be dementia; he was then living in Pawlet, Vermont, where 19th-century chronicler of that village Hiel Hollister described him graphically as "nervous and sensitive, impulsive and excitable, in tattered garb, with untrimmed locks and beard, in a state bordering on insanity, [wandering] through our streets for many a year", before entering the Washington County poorhouse in Argyle where he eventually died.
