= The Social Harp =

Shape note tune book by John G. McCurry

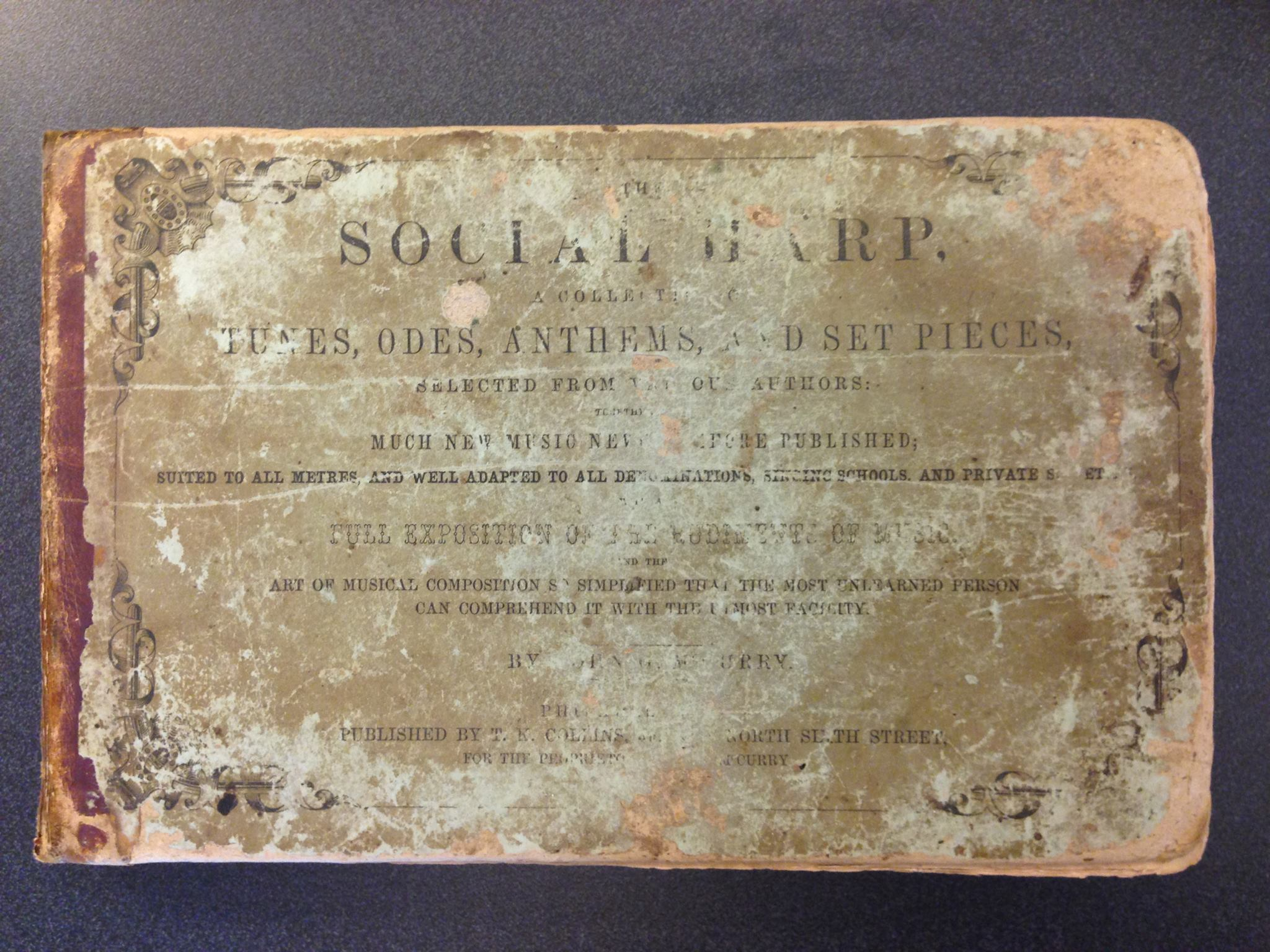
One of the copies of the 1855 printing of The Social Harp that was used in the creation of the 1973 fascimile edition. This book is now in the collection of the Pitts Theology Library at Emory University, Atlanta, Georgia.

The Social Harp is a shape note tune book compiled by John G. McCurry, first published in 1855. It uses the four-note system of notation pioneered by William Little and William Smith. The book is notable as a document of songs circulating in the oral tradition in North Georgia in the 19th century, and as the source for several tunes found in more recent shape note collections, including The Sacred Harp: 2025 Edition, The Christian Harmony, The Shenandoah Harmony, and The Valley Pocket Harmonist. The University of Georgia Press published a facsimile edition of The Social Harp in 1973, which is used at an annual all-day shape note singing near Athens, Georgia.

== History ==
The Social Harp was compiled by John Gordon McCurry of Bio, Hart County, Georgia. The Social Harp was first published in 1855, and was reprinted in 1859 and 1868 with no changes to the contents. The University of Georgia Press published a facsimile edition in 1973, edited by Daniel W. Patterson and John F. Garst, based on the 1855 printing.

The Social Harp was not as popular as other shape note tune books like The Sacred Harp or The Christian Harmony, and by the early 20th century it had nearly disappeared. When American musicologist George Pullen Jackson first wrote about the book he had only seen one incomplete copy from the 1859 printing, and he inferred the existence of an 1855 printing. The editors of the facsimile edition in 1973 could only locate seven surviving copies of The Social Harp, all of them damaged or otherwise incomplete, so the facsimile edition was based on two of the best available copies from the 1855 printing.

The 1973 release of the facsimile edition of The Social Harp was celebrated with an all-day singing on the campus of The University of Georgia, attended by Sacred Harp singers from the western and southern parts of Georgia. John Garst noted in the minutes of the 1973 singing that it was probably the first all-day singing using The Social Harp in the 20th century. The Social Harp singing has become an annual event on the 4th Sunday in February, and celebrated its 50th session in 2024.

== Content ==
The Social Harp contains 221 songs. Over half of the songs appeared in earlier shape note tune books, including The Sacred Harp, The Hesperian Harp, The Southern Harmony, and Kentucky Harmony, while 97 were new.

McCurry credited most of the new songs in The Social Harp to himself and his friends and neighbors in Hart County. Many of these songs are arrangements of songs circulating in the oral tradition. McCurry sometimes acknowledged the folk singers from whom he learned a song, as when he wrote "This Tune is arranged as sung by William Bowers, Eagle Grove, Georgia." (footnote to the song "Bower's, or Happy Souls" on page 82). George Pullen Jackson discussed the folk song origins of many of these tunes in the 1930s, and wrote that "...if ever a book grew out of its native soil, that book was McCurry's Social Harp." Sacred Harp composer Raymond Hamrick noted that "shape-notes enabled John G. McCurry to set down and arrange folk tunes when he was compiling The Social Harp."

Seven of the new songs are credited to Philadelphia composer Elphrey Heritage. Elphrey Heritage worked as a bookkeeper at the printing firm T. K. and P. G. Collins of Philadelphia, and had songs included in several shape note tune books printed by Collins between 1846 and 1870, including James B. Aikin's The Christian Minstrel, The Hesperian Harp, The Timbrel of Zion, The Social Harp, and The Sacred Harp.

The remaining songs were drawn from several older shape-note books, including 107 songs that were in The Sacred Harp, Second Edition (1850). B. F. White, writing in his newspaper The Organ on February 2, 1856, objected that "...this work [The Social Harp] contains some thirty-five or forty pieces of music which belongs to the proprietors of the Sacred Harp, under copyright protection, which has been insetted in the Social Harp without consent or consultation. That music is directly the property of White, Massengale & Co., and no man has the right to re-copyright the same music unless consent is obtained and certified in writing."

On the other hand, two months later on April 5, 1856 The Organ published a letter to the editor from Edmund Dumas with a favorable review of The Social Harp, including this praise: "Musical brothers in Georgia and elsewhere, you ought to have it in connection with the Sacred Harp, Hesperian Harp, and all good Harps, -- There is one or two new pieces in the Social Harp that is richly worth one dollar. Come boys, test what I say."

There are different opinions on the meaning of "Social" in the book's title. American musicologist George Pullen Jackson wrote "the word "Social" in the title meant what is now understood by "congregational". Daniel W. Patterson, co-editor of the 1973 facsimile edition, proposed that "social" meant that McCurry intended this book to be used by singing schools, which was also the reason for the unusual structure of the book -- the songs are grouped in six sections, with the first four sections including songs that all have the same tonic: A, F, G, and then E, a fifth section with "gems in various keys" and the sixth section for more complicated "anthems and set pieces". The Social Harp also includes more songs on secular subjects than many other 19th century shape note tune books, including "Buonaparte," about Napoleon's exile to Saint Helena, "Jolly Soldier," celebrating General George Washington, and the criminal's farewell "Musgrove".

== Influences on Other Song Books ==
Songs from The Social Harp were added to later tune books, including four different editions of The Sacred Harp:

- The Sacred Harp, Fourth Edition (1870) included "Father Land" (retitled "Fatherland")
- Original Sacred Harp (1911) (also known as the "James Book") added "Good-by", "Raymond", "River of Jordan", "Roll Jordan", "O Save" (retitled "Save, Mighty Lord"), and "Singing School"
- The Sacred Harp, 1991 Edition added "Parting Friends"
- The Sacred Harp: 2025 Edition added "Heavenly Meeting" and "Lisbon"
- The Christian Harmony includes five songs from The Social Harp: "A Home in Heaven", "Kay", "O Save", "Raymond", and "Singing School".
- The Shenandoah Harmony includes twenty-one songs from The Social Harp: "Heavenly Dove", "Blooming Wilderness", "Lisbon", "Coldwater", "The Harvest Field", "Wedlock", "Mosley", "John Adkin's Farewell", "Zion's Walls", "Hermon", "Russell", "River of Jordan", "Wake Up", "Marion", "The Beggar", "Palms of Victory", "Crumbly", "Buonaparte", "Jolly Soldier", "Weeping Mary", and "Musgrove".
- The Valley Pocket Harmonist includes "Kay"
