= William Hauser =

William Clarke Hauser was an American minister, medical doctor, teacher, composer, and music publisher.

== Biography ==
He was born December 23, 1812, in Bethania, Forsyth County, North Carolina. He was the son of Martin Hauser and Leah Billiter.

William Hauser united with the Methodist Church in 1827 and was licensed to preach in 1834 and was a circuit riding preacher for two years. On March 23, 1837, he married Eliza M. Renshaw (1813–1880), and they had three children: Carolina Elizabeth Hauser Parker (1838–1926), William Clarke Hauser (1844–1919), and Victor McLandhton Hauser (1847–1919). William Hauser raised his family in New Orleans, LA and Victor Hauser did the same in Ogden, Utah. William Hauser attended Henry College in Virginia, beginning in 1839. After moving to Georgia in 1841, he began the study of medicine. He later taught at Oglethorpe Medical College in Savannah, GA.

Hauser died on September 18, 1880. His last words were ″I feel that my work on earth is done, and there is not a cloud between me and God.″ William and Eliza Hauser are buried on their plantation, Hesperia, near Wadley in Jefferson County, Georgia. According to a family member, "Hesperia Plantation was located on the southwestern corner of E. A. Goodson Road and Cooper Road. Cooper Road changes its name to West Smith Street and ends on the east end at the Cheatham/Hauser (Wadley City) Cemetery in Wadley, Georgia." The house is evidently no longer standing.

== Music ==
Hauser made two significant contributions in the area of shape note music: (1) The Hesperian Harp: a Collection of Psalm and Hymn Tunes, Odes and Anthems, published in four shapes at Philadelphia by T. K. Collins Jr. in 1848; and (2) Olive Leaf: A Collection of Beautiful Tunes, New and Old; the Whole of One or More Hymns Accompanying Each Tune, for the Glory of God, and the Good of Mankind, published in seven shapes at Wadley, Georgia, by Hauser and Benjamin Turner in 1878. The Hesperian Harp was probably the largest shape note tune book of its day, containing 552 pages of music, including 36 songs composed by Hauser. His Olive Leaf was produced in the seven shape notes of Jesse B. Aikin and contained only eight of his compositions from the older book. But his new compositions numbered forty-eight. Thirteen of his compositions are included in the Shenandoah Harmony (2013) in four shapes. The Moravian Music Foundation calls William Hauser "Appalachia's most significant contribution to American music."
