= James P. Carrell =

American songwriter

James P. Carrell (February 13, 1787 – October 28, 1854), of Lebanon, Virginia, was a minister, singing teacher, composer and songbook compiler. He compiled two songbooks in the four-shape shape note tradition.

== Musical compilations ==
Carrell's Songs of Zion was a small book of 64 pages, printed by Ananias Davisson in Harrisonburg, Virginia in 1821 and containing mostly music by Carrell himself. In 1831, Carrell released Virginia Harmony with David L. Clayton (1801-1854). This book was printed in Winchester, Virginia by Samuel H. Davis, containing 191 tunes on 167 pages. A second edition of Virginia Harmony was printed in 1836 with 33 additional pages of music. Seventeen songs in this edition are attributed to Carrell.

One of the songs in Virginia Harmony was the Isaac Watts hymn "There Is a Land of Pure Delight", set to the anonymous tune "Harmony Grove". "Harmony Grove" is now the tune most associated with the John Newton hymn "Amazing Grace", and for many years Carrell and Clayton were credited as the composers.

== Personal life ==
Carrell was born February 13, 1787, in Washington County, Virginia. He married Martha George Peery. They had two children, Charles and George. Carrell was a minister of the Methodist Church. In addition to his ministerial and musical activities, Carrell served as county court clerk of Russell County, Virginia. He died October 28, 1854, and is buried in the Old Lebanon Cemetery (aka North Church Street Cemetery).
