= Union Harmony =

Hymn book

The Union Harmony is a shape note hymn and tune book compiled by William Caldwell. The book was released in 1837, and is part of the larger tradition of shape note singing.

William Caldwell was born in 1801 in Tennessee, the son of Anthony Caldwell and Elizabeth Aiken. William Caldwell first married Cinderella Blackburn in 1829. After her death, he married Harriet Rebecca Meek. William's children include Tillman A., Orville H., Cordula J., Leonidas Beecher, Eliza, Catherine Josephine, Mary Alice, Evaline V., and Amy H. Caldwell. The Caldwells moved from Jefferson County, Tennessee some time after 1850 to Fannin County, Texas. William died in 1857 and Harriet in 1858.

Union Harmony or Family Musician was a four shape tunebook, registered in 1834, but printed in 1837 in Maryville, Tennessee by Ferdinand A. Parham. It contained 151 tunes, of which 43 songs are credited to William Caldwell. Many of these tunes, Caldwell wrote, were "not entirely original, but he has harmonized, and therefore claims them." David Music called this book "The First East Tennessee Tunebook". Writers from George Pullen Jackson to Harry Eskew consider the chief contribution on Caldwell and the Union Harmony to be the preservation of folk songs of the oral tradition. Union Harmony went through only one printing. Though long out of print, Caldwell's songs have survived in other shape note tune books, such as The Good Old Songs by C. H. Cayce, The Sacred Harp by B. F. White and E. J. King, and more recently (2013), the Shenandoah Harmony.

== 43 tunes credited to Caldwell ==
Amazing Grace, Bethesda, Canton, Concord, Erie, Family Bible, Fortitude, Frugality, Funeral Thought, Home, Hopewell, Humility, Iantha, Imandra, Immensity, Intercession, Joyful Sound, Loving Kindness, Majesty, Malinda, Merit, Missionary Hymn, Mount Carmel, New Hope, New Market, Newport, Redemption, Redeeming Love, Saint Paul, Sharon, Solemn Thought, Star in the East, Sweet Prospect, The Good Shepherd, The Mariner, The Mouldering Vine, The Pilgrim's Lot, The Shepherd's Joy, Tranquility, Union, Wakefield, Westford, Zion's Call
