= The Virginia Harmony =

1831 shape note tunebook

The 1831 edition of The Virginia Harmony

The Virginia Harmony is a shape note tune book published in 1831 in Winchester, Virginia and compiled by Methodist lay preacher James P. Carrell (1787–1854) and Presbyterian elder David L. Clayton (1801–1854).

It is one of the earliest known print sources of the tune for "Amazing Grace", given in The Virginia Harmony as "Harmony Grove" and used as a setting for the Isaac Watts hymn "There Is a Land of Pure Delight". The "Amazing Grace" text was not set to this melody until the 1847 Southern Harmony, where the tune was called "New Britain".
