= New Harp of Columbia =

The New Harp of Columbia is a seven-shape shape note tune book first published in 1867 in Knoxville, Tennessee by Marcus Lafayette Swan. A successor to The Harp of Columbia published by Swan and his father, W.H. Swan, in 1848, The New Harp includes a mixture of hymn tunes, folk hymns, fuguing pieces, and anthems, along with several of Swan's original compositions. The book maintains popularity in East Tennessee, with about 20 singings in 2004.

== Publication background ==
Marcus Lafayette Swan was born in Knoxville in 1827, the son of prominent lawyer William H. Swan, Jr. (1798–1859). In 1847, his father married Hannah Wells Crozier, who hailed from a prominent family of Knoxville politicians and businesspeople. The Croziers' business enterprises included a printing company, Crozier & Barton, which had published hymn books as early as 1825, and thus may have inspired the Swans to publish their own collection of songs. The Harp of Columbia, published by the Swans as a singing school manual in 1848, was moderately successful, and was reprinted several times during the 1850s.

During the Civil War, Marcus Swan supported the Confederacy, and fled to Bellefonte, Alabama, when the Union Army occupied Knoxville. While living in Bellefonte, he wrote the introduction to The New Harp of Columbia, which was published in Knoxville in 1867. By the time of his death, Swan had amassed a relatively large fortune.

The New Harp of Columbia has been reprinted numerous times since its initial publication. Musicologist Dorothy Horn suggests the success of The New Harp is due to its excellent printing and its larger than normal sample of standard tunes favored by various Protestant denominations.

== Contents ==
The New Harp of Columbia contains a unique seven-shape system devised by the Swans, which differs from the "standard" seven-shape notation developed by songmaster Jesse B. Aikin during the same period. Marcus Swan kept much of the material from The Harp of Columbia, but also included several tunes by popular hymn composer Lowell Mason and several of his own compositions. A 2001 "Restored Edition" of The New Harp adds a section of 39 pages of tunes from the 1848 Harp of Columbia which were not included in the original New Harp of Columbia.

The songs in The New Harp come from both European (especially English and Scottish) and American singing traditions. Along with Swan's compositions, The New Harp includes songs such as "Coronation" by Oliver Holden, "Easter Anthem" and "Rose of Sharon" by William Billings, "Creation" by Nehemiah Shumway, "Arlington" by Thomas Arne, and "Duke Street" by John Hatton. The book also includes a number of folk hymns, such as "Promised Land," "Idumea," and "Golden Hill." Several tunes were derived from European folk songs, such as "Hamburg" (derived from "Auld Lang Syne"), "Bruce's Address" (from "Scots Wha Hae"), and "Marston" (from "Farmer in the Dell").

== See also ==
- List of shape-note tunebooks
