= Hymn board =

Hymnal sign in a church

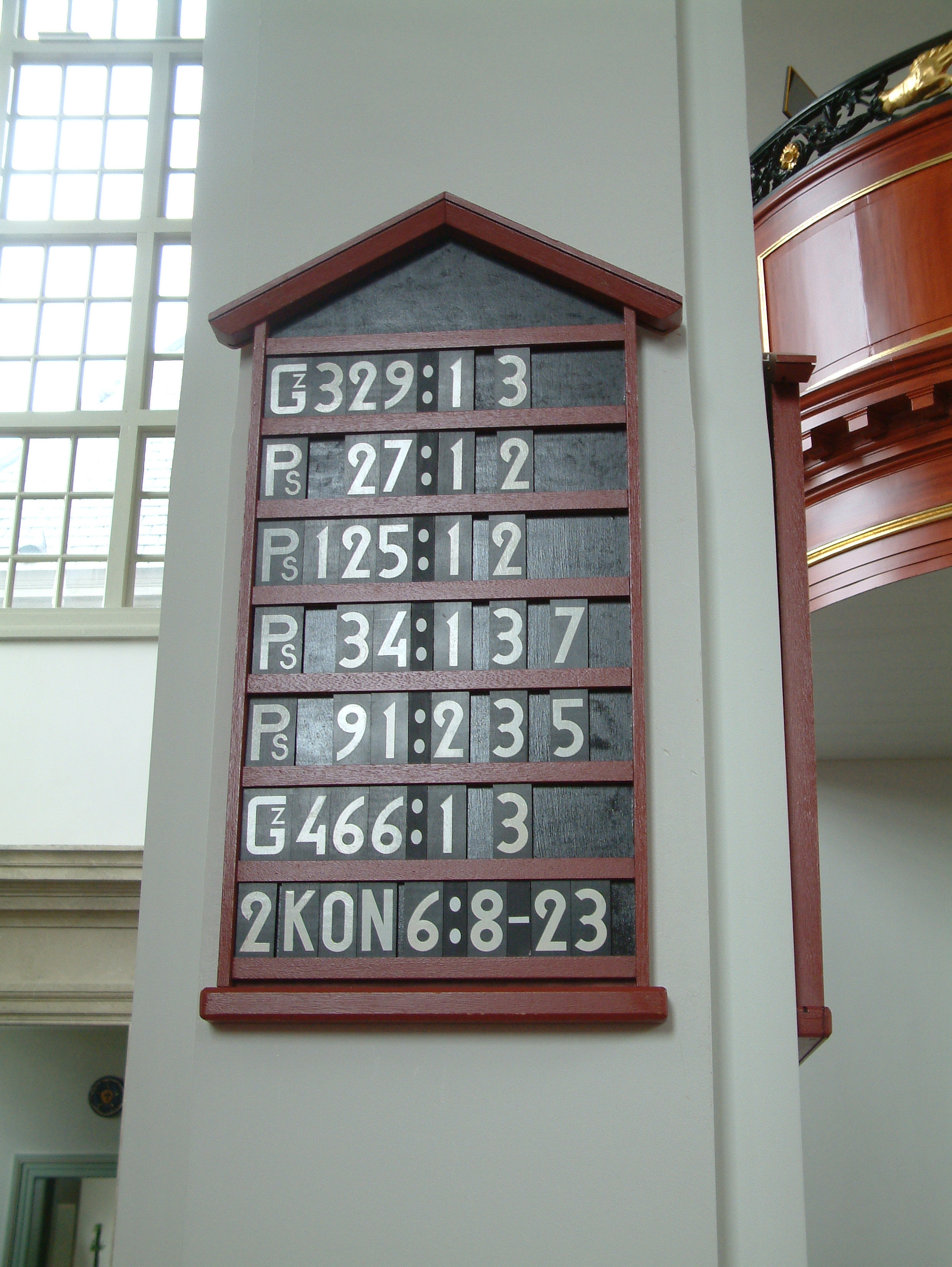
Hymn board in Zoetermeer (The Netherlands)

A hymn board is a board in a church building that lists the hymns that will be sung during the service. Normally, the hymns are indicated by the number under which the hymn appears in the church's hymnal. The display of hymn numbers in this way can allow the congregation to bookmark the relevant pages of the hymnal in advance, to make it easier to worship during the service. Hymn numbers may also be printed on a notice sheet distributed before the service.

== History ==
Hymn boards originated in the sixteenth century. Originally, the usual practice was to write the opening lines of the hymns on the board, but in the early eighteenth century, it became more common to refer to the hymns' numbers in the church's hymnal.

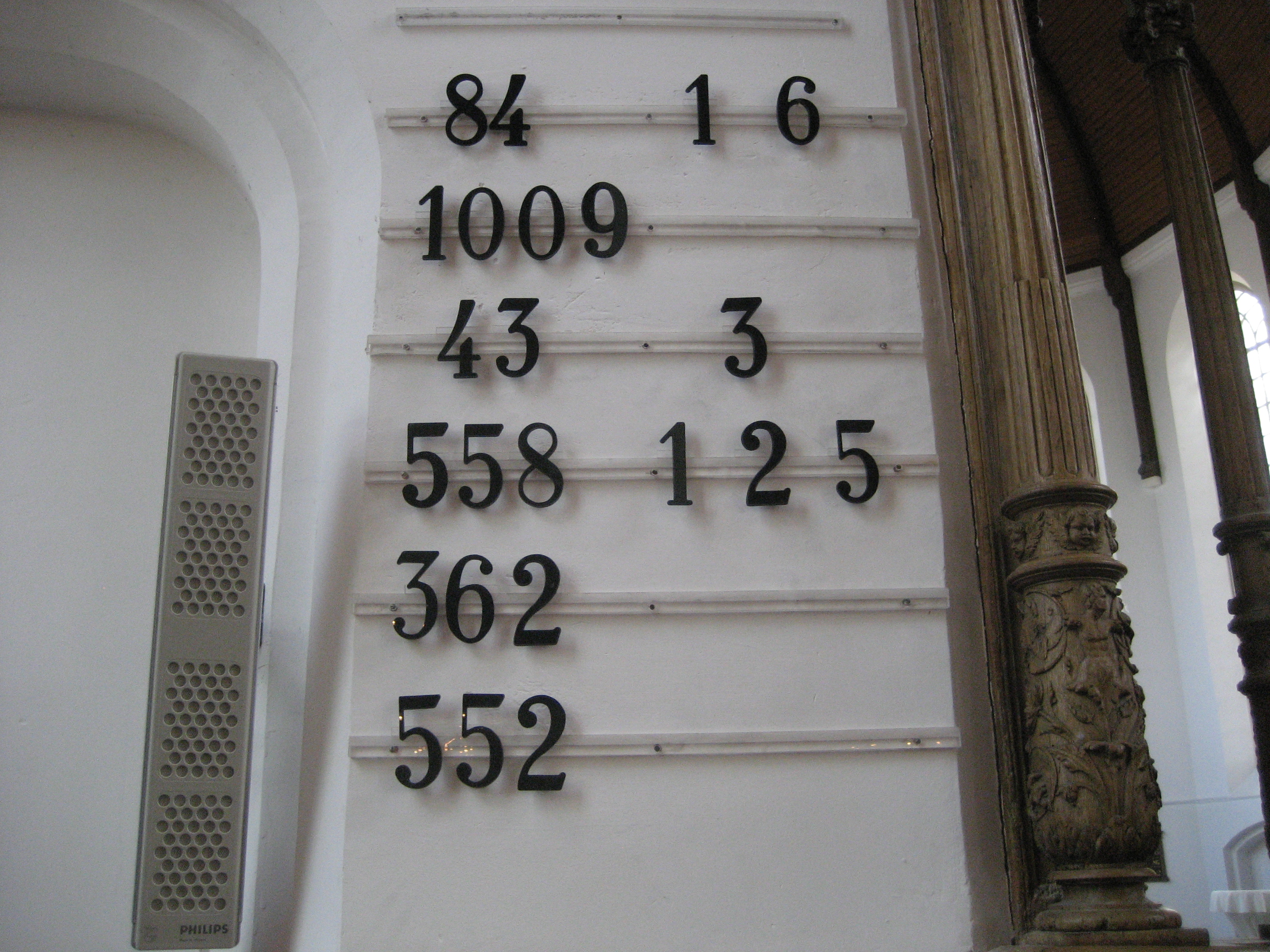
Abcoude

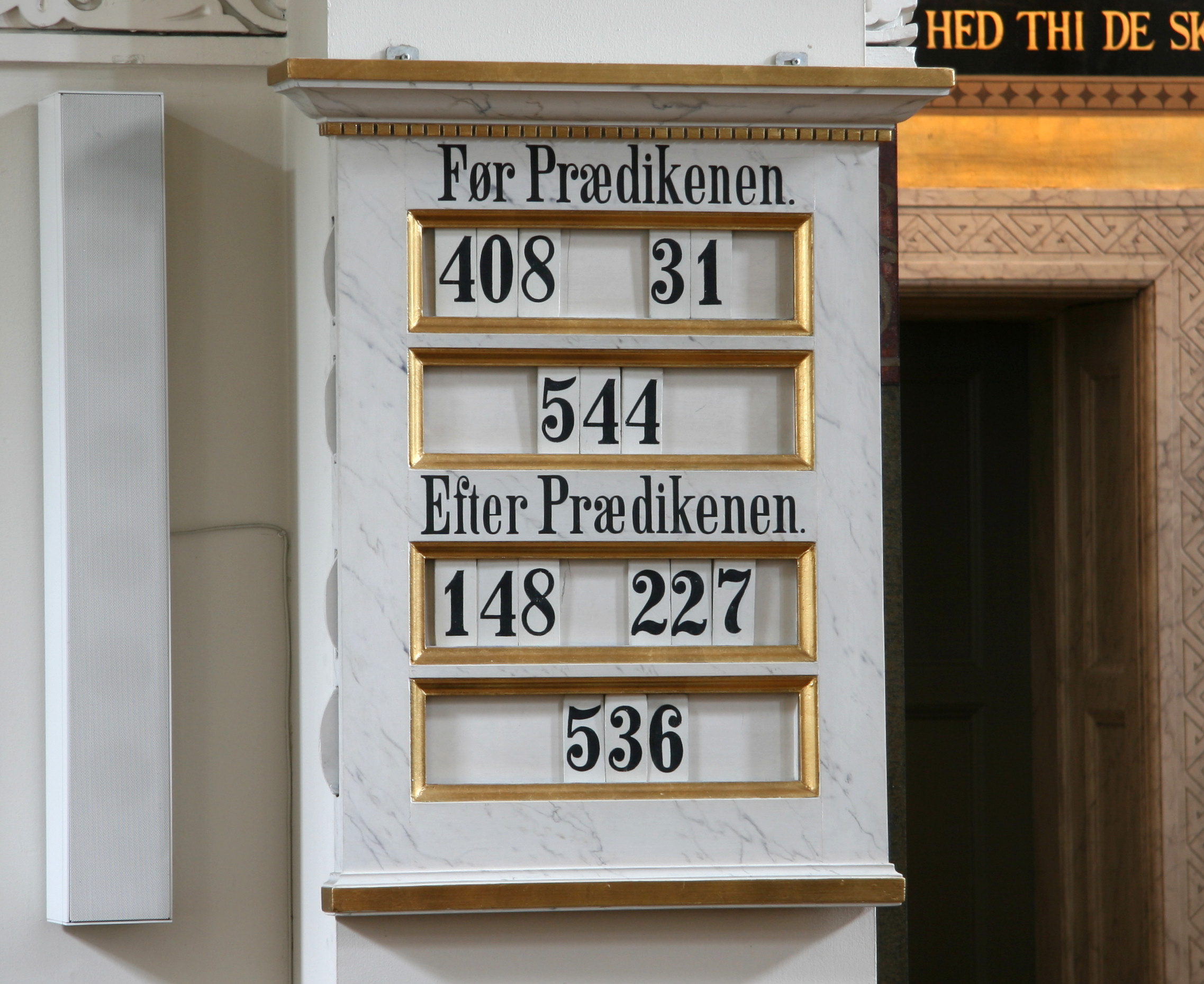
Copenhagen

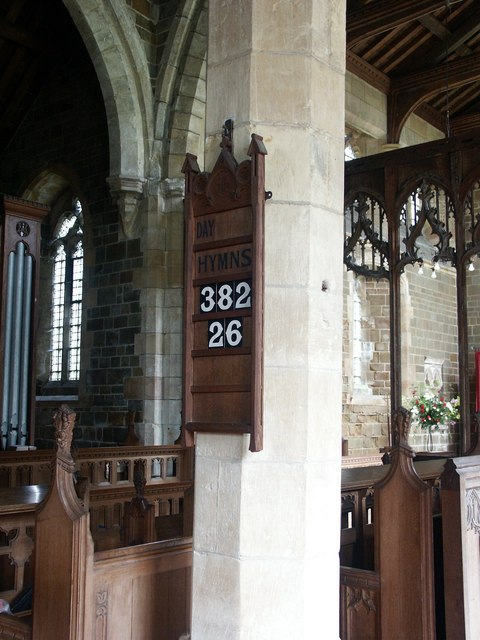
East Kirkby

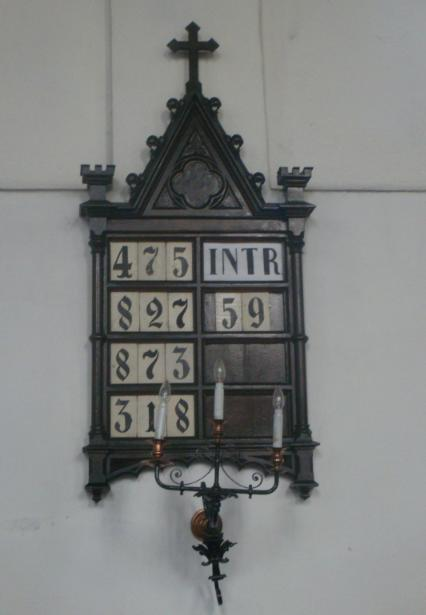
Szopienice

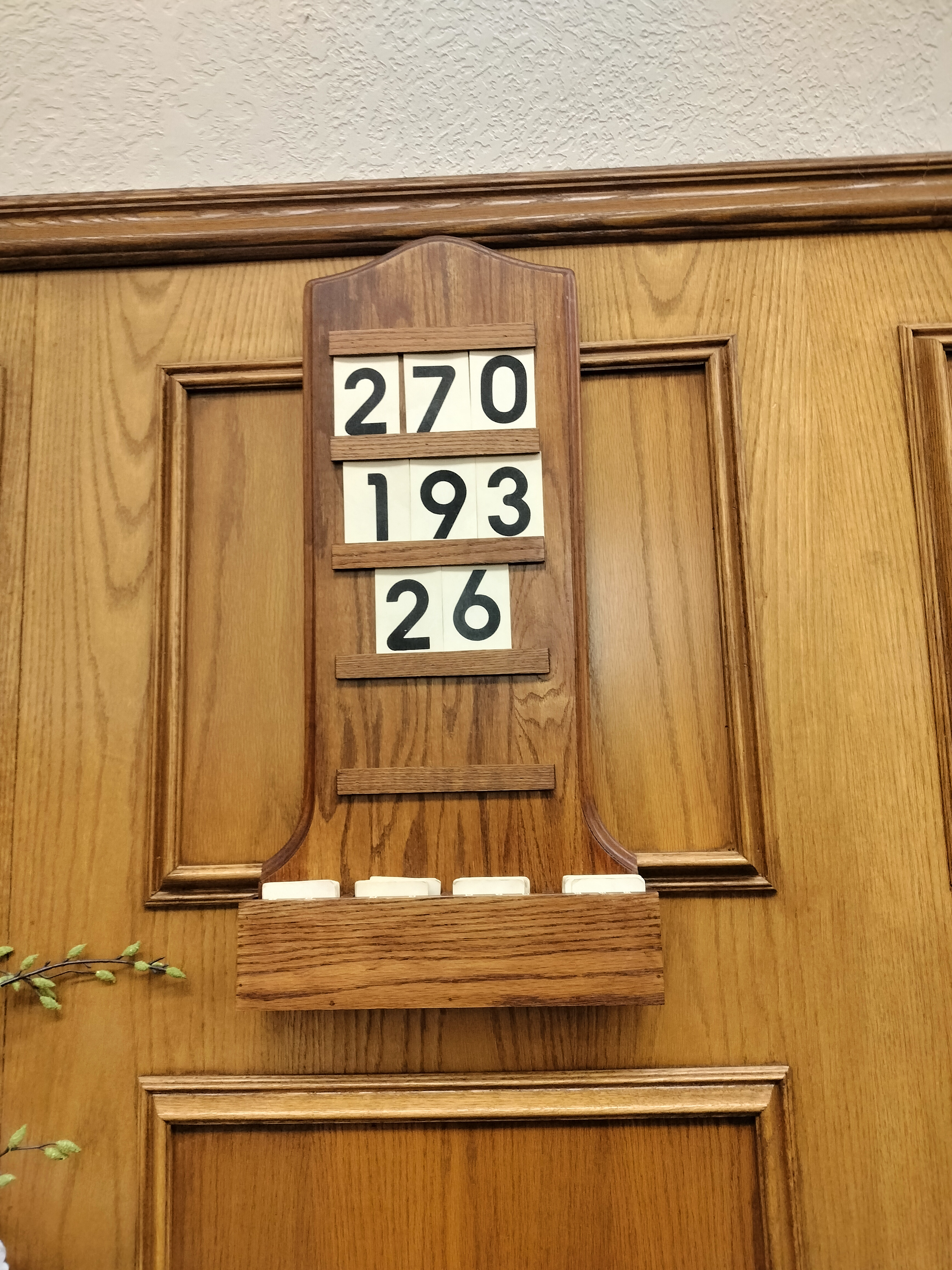
LDS chapel

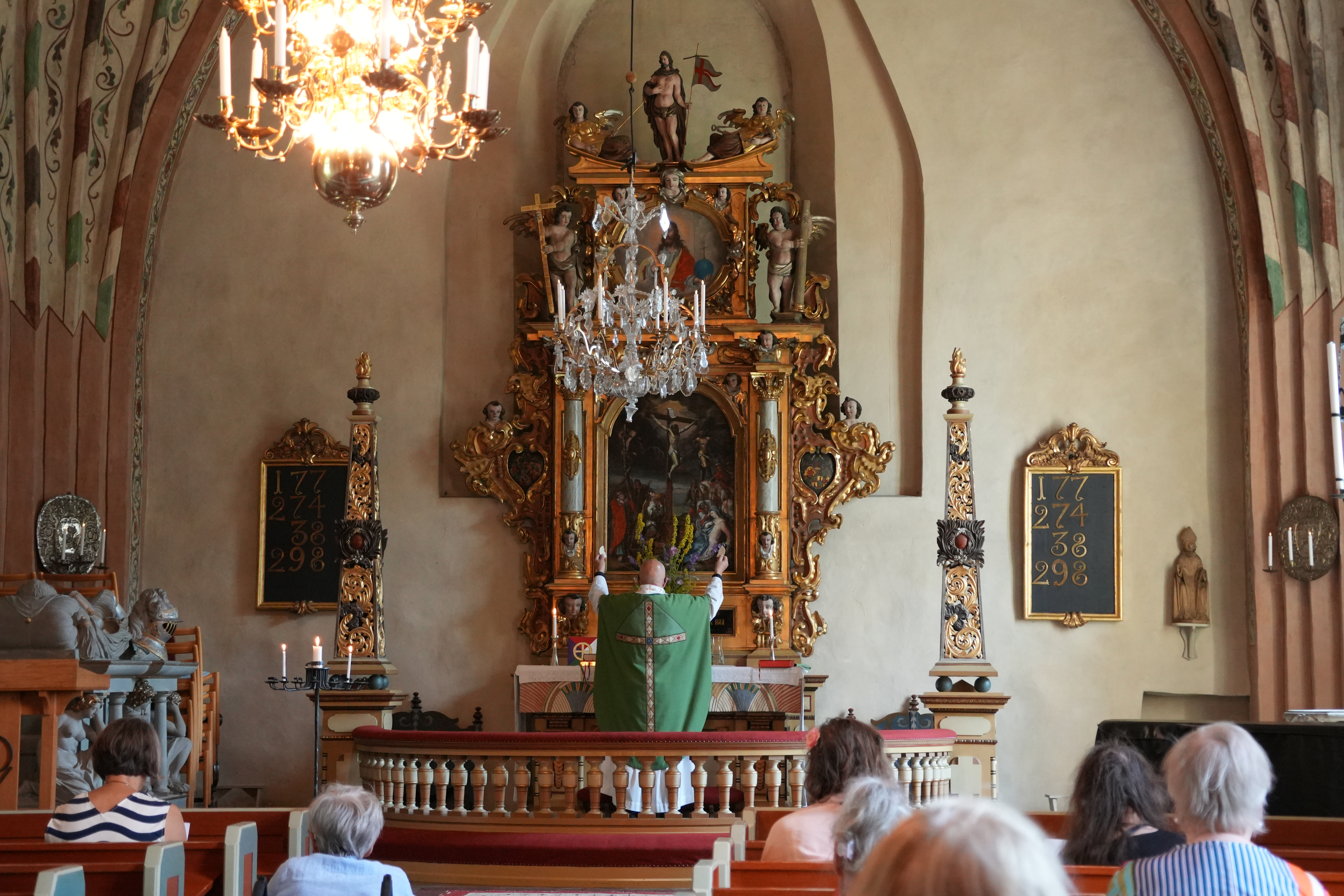
The hymn board visible during the offering of High Mass at Länna Church (Evangelical-Lutheran) in Norrtälje, Sweden
