= Christian Hymnary =

Hymnbook used by Mennonites and other Anabaptist groups

The Christian Hymnary is a hymnbook used by Mennonites and other Anabaptist groups. It was compiled by John J. Overholt, and published in 1972. Featured in this hymnbook is a compilation of over 1000 hymns, including classic hymns, Martyr Songs from the Ausbund, Evangelistic and Gospel Songs and tunes from the Harmonia Sacra. It is widely used in conservative Mennonite circles.
