= The Christian Harmony =

The Christian Harmony is a shape note hymn and tune book compiled by William Walker. The book was released in 1866 (1867 according to some sources). It is part of the larger tradition of shape note singing.

== Origin ==
Title page of the 1873 edition

William Walker was born in 1809 in South Carolina, and grew up near Spartanburg. He became a Baptist song leader and shape note "singing master." Walker and Benjamin Franklin White, publisher of The Sacred Harp, married sisters. In 1835, Walker published a tunebook entitled The Southern Harmony in four-shape (fasola) notation. He incorporated over half of the contents of this Southern Harmony into his Christian Harmony in 1866. For The Christian Harmony, Walker changed from the four-shape system to a seven-shape (doremi) system. Retaining the original four shapes of the Southern Harmony, he devised three other shapes of his own. In defending his change from the four-shape system which he had previously championed, Walker explained that parents wouldn't name seven children with only four names. A second edition was released in 1873. William Walker died on September 24, 1875.

== Later editions ==
Before the publication of a combined new edition of The Christian Harmony in 2010, two editions were in use - the "Carolina book" or "Walker book," and the "Alabama book" or "Deason book."

=== Carolina book ===
The books used in western North Carolina and adjacent areas were 1979, 1994, and 2002 reprints of Walker's 1873 edition of the Christian Harmony. None of the old songs were changed in the new reprint; four songs and some commentary were added.

=== Alabama book ===
The "Alabama" edition was a revision carried out under the leadership of O. A. Parris and John H. Deason and published in 1958. This edition utilized Jesse B. Aikin's seven-shape system; this change was made because Aikin's system was the most common among gospel singers in the South. In addition to changing to the Aikin notation, the 1958 revision deleted some songs and added new ones:

We have removed from the old book 179 songs. These will found to be the songs very rarely if ever used. We have changed numbers on but 34 songs and in all cases this was not easily avoidable. On 37 of these songs we have given them more room in order that they may be more easily read. We have included 102 songs both old and new that we feel will help very much to make a better and more useful book. (Preface to 1958 edition)

It was used mainly in Alabama and Mississippi. Revisions of the "Alabama" book were released in 1994, with a few song changes and corrections, and again in 2002.

=== Combined 2010 edition ===
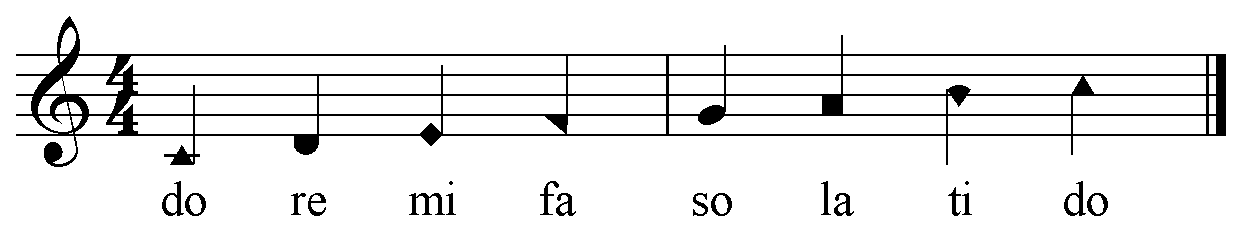
The seven-shape Aikin system of notation

The 2010 edition contains 672 songs. The book is newly typeset and uses the Aikin seven-shape system.

Pages 1–381 largely reproduce the contents and pagination of the 1958 Alabama book. Pages 397–541t contain songs present in the Carolina book but omitted by the 1958 revisers, in order (approximately 200 songs). (Pages 388, 393b, and 545b also contain music from the Carolina book, out of order.) Pages 382, 384–385, 543–545t, 546–548, and 549b (the final song in the book) contain new music not included in the Carolina book or in the 1958 Alabama book. The remaining twelve and a half pages consist of songs from the 1958 Alabama book that have been moved for a more spacious layout.

== Singing communities and traditions ==
In 1933, George Pullen Jackson reported on Christian Harmony singings in four states: South Carolina (in and around Spartanburg and in York, Union, and Greenville counties), North Carolina (Rutherford and Buncombe counties), southern Missouri (a tradition of singings stretching back to 1889), and Alabama (56 singings in 1932 in "nine mid-state counties"). The publisher, the E.W. Miller Company of Philadelphia, reported sales largely limited to the Spartanburg area at that time.

Online minutes record 43 singings from The Christian Harmony in 2010 (12 in North Carolina, nine in Alabama, six in Georgia, six in Virginia, five in South Carolina, three in Tennessee, one in Mississippi, and one in Texas) and 23 singings in 2011 (11 in North Carolina, three in South Carolina, three in Tennessee, three in Georgia, two in Alabama, and one in Arkansas). Camp DoReMi, a summer singing school in Little Switzerland, North Carolina, is held annually and uses both The Christian Harmony and the New Harp of Columbia.

The Newton County, Mississippi, Christian Harmony Convention was organized in 1875 and is believed to be the oldest continuing Christian Harmony convention. This singing has evolved or preserved some distinctive traditional features, such as a sustained ringing style of singing, and the use of "The Drone" as a closing song.

A singing tradition with deep roots continues in Haywood and Transylvania counties, North Carolina. Old Folks Day in Canton has featured singing from the Christian Harmony since the nineteenth century, at the Morning Star Methodist Church, and before that at the Locust Field Church (now the First Baptist Church). The twice-yearly Etowah singing, now held in Horseshoe, N.C., has been held since 1909.

On Sunday 27 October 2013 the first Christian Harmony All-Day Singing in Europe took place at St Mary's Church in Primrose Hill, hosted by the Sacred Harp Singers of London, who now regularly sing from the 2010 edition of Walker's Christian Harmony. In attendance were Sacred Harp singers from the UK & Ireland, Europe, and the US. The event is scheduled to take place that same Sunday in October 2014 at the same venue.
