= Jesse B. Aikin =

American shape note compiler (1808–1900)

Jesse Bowman Aikin (1808–1900) was a shape note "singing master", and compiler of the shape note tune book The Christian Minstrel. He was born in Chester County, Pennsylvania and lived on a farm in Hatfield, Pennsylvania. Aikin, a member of the Church of the Brethren, was the first to successfully produce a song book (The Christian Minstrel) with a seven-shape note system, in 1846. He vigorously defended his "invention" and his patent, which included the elimination of bass and treble clefs and the simplification of time signatures. After the influential Ruebush & Kieffer Publishing Company began using his notehead shapes around 1876 (previously they used Funk's shapes), the Aikin shapes eventually became the prevailing standard in shape note and gospel music publication, although few other compilers adopted his other innovations.

Aikin's names for the notes were originally written Doe Ray Mee Faw Sole Law See. All the note stems pointed downwards, and the stems for Doe, Ray, and See were placed centrally on the shape, rather than to the side. These conventions were discarded by later users of his system, so as not to deviate so much from standard notation. The name See was also changed to Ti (as used in the Tonic sol-fa system), so as not to be confused with a sharpened Sol.

Today Aikin's system is still in use, though it is often referred to as the Aiken system, a spelling error introduced by George Pullen Jackson and perpetuated by the Sibelius music notation program.

== Aikin's shapes ==
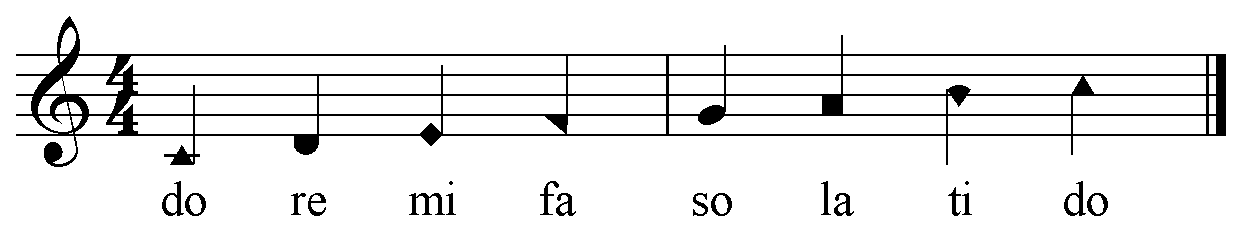

== Publications ==
- The Christian Minstrel, 1846
- Harmonia Ecclesiæ, Companion to The Christian Minstrel, 1853
- The Sabbath School Minstrel, 1859

== See also ==
- The Christian Harmony
