= The Hesperian Harp =

Title page of The Hesperian Harp (1874 edition)

The Hesperian Harp is a shape note tunebook published in 1848 by Dr William Hauser, with reprintings issued in 1852, 1853, and 1874. Subtitled A Collection of Psalm and Hymn Tunes, Odes and Anthems, it is named after Hauser's plantation, Hesperia, in Jefferson County, Georgia. The word "harp" is often found in the titles of such tunebooks, most famously The Sacred Harp (although "Harmony" is also common, to emphasize the then-new concept of 4-part harmony, unlike the earlier method of lined-out hymnody that was being supplanted). The Hesperian Harp was probably the largest shape note tune book of its day, containing 552 pages of music, including 36 songs composed by Hauser. It uses the four-note system of notation pioneered by William Little and William Smith.
