= George Pullen Jackson =

American educator and musicologist (1874–1953)

- Born: 1874; Monson, Maine
- Died: 1953 (aged 78–79)
- Education: Vanderbilt University; University of Chicago
- Occupation: Academic
- Relatives: Carman Barnes (stepdaughter)

George Pullen Jackson (1874–1953) was an American educator and musicologist. He was a pioneer in the field of Southern (U.S.) hymnody. He was responsible for popularizing the term "white spirituals" to describe "fasola" singing.

== Early life ==
George Pullen Jackson was born in 1874 in Monson, Maine. He graduated from Vanderbilt University in 1902. While in college, he was a member of Sigma Alpha Epsilon. He received a Bachelor of Philosophy in 1904 and a PhD in 1911 from the University of Chicago.

== Career ==
Jackson was an Assistant Professor of German at the University of South Dakota in the 1910s. By the 1930s, he had joined the faculty at his alma mater, Vanderbilt University. He was also a music critic for the Nashville Banner, and the president and manager of the Nashville Symphony Society.

Jackson argued that Tennesseans in the Antebellum South were "far more musically active" than after the war. He added that many people used to attend singing schools, and he blamed the lack of musical training on the radio, which discouraged people from learning to sing in the postbellum era.

Additionally, Jackson argued that Negro spirituals took their origin from poor whites who sang old folk songs from England.

During the 1940s, he studied the roots of anabaptist music (Amish and Mennonite). He proposed the now generally accepted view that the original tunes used in Der Ausbund hymnal were popular medieval melodies. Der Ausbund is still used by Amish groups and has the distinction of being the hymnal with a history of the longest continual use (1564 to the present; the latest edition being published in 1999).

== Works ==
- White Spirituals in the Southern Uplands: The Story of the Fasola Folk, Their Songs, Singings, and "Buckwheat Notes". University of North Carolina Press, 1933
- Spiritual Folk-Songs of Early America: Two Hundred and Fifty Tunes and Texts with an Introduction and Notes. Augustin, 1937
- Down-East Spirituals and Others: Three Hundred Songs Supplementary to the Author's "Spiritual Folk-Songs of Early America". Augustin, 1939
- White and Negro Spirituals, Their Lifespan and Kinship: Tracing 200 Years of Untrammeled Song Making and Singing Among Our Country Folk, with 116 Songs as Sung by Both Races. Augustin, 1943
- The Story of the Sacred Harp, 1844-1944. Vanderbilt University Press, 1944
- A Directory of Sacred Harp Singers and Singing Conventions. 1945
- American Folk Music for High School and other Choral Groups. C. C. Birchard and Co., 1947 (a collaboration with Charles Faulkner Bryan)
- Another Sheaf of White Spirituals. University of Florida Press, 1952

== See also ==
- Sacred Harp
- Performance practice of Sacred Harp music
