= Shape note =

Musical notation for group singing

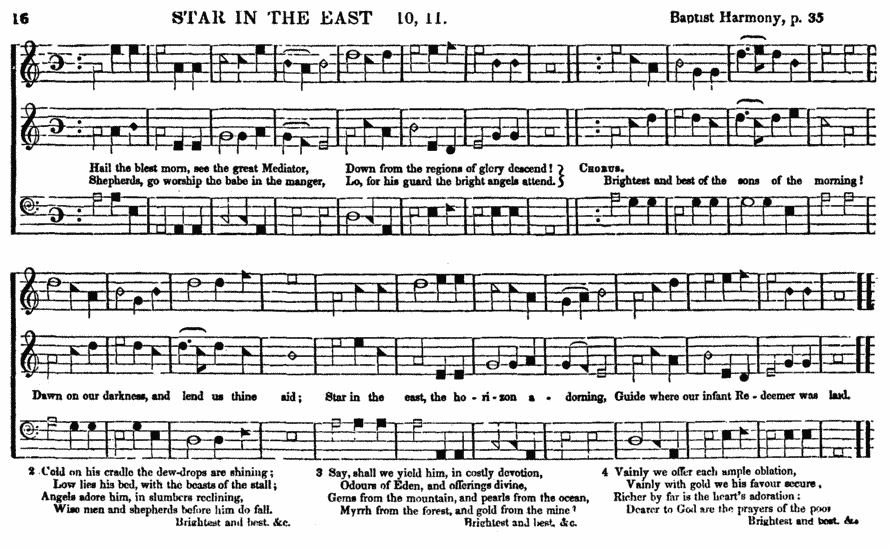
"Star in the East" from the 1854 edition of Southern Harmony

Star in the East
Audio recording, performed multi-tracked

Shape notes are a musical notation designed to facilitate congregational and social singing. The notation became a popular teaching device in American singing schools during the 19th century. Shapes were added to the noteheads in written music to help singers find pitches within major and minor scales without the use of more complex information found in key signatures on the staff.

Shape notes of various kinds have been used for over two centuries in a variety of music traditions.

== Nomenclature ==
Shape notes have also been called character notes, patent notes and, pejoratively, buckwheat notes and dunce notes.

== Overview ==
The idea behind shape notes is that the parts of a vocal work can be learned more quickly and easily if the music is printed in shapes that match up with the solfège syllables with which the notes of the musical scale are sung. For instance, in the four-shape tradition used in the Sacred Harp and elsewhere, the notes of a C major scale are notated and sung (Note: The syllables used derive from Guidonian solmization of overlapping hexachords, none of which included the entire diatonic scale (a system also used in Elizabethan England): see Solfège#Origin.) as follows:

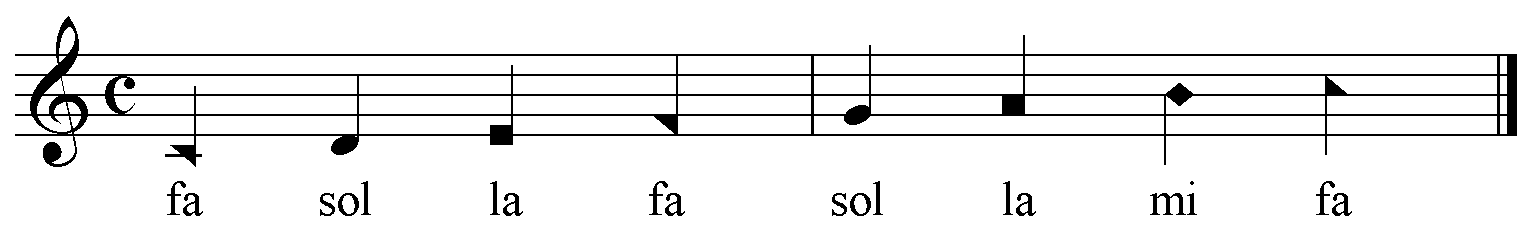
The C major scale in shape notes

A skilled singer experienced in a shape note tradition has developed a fluent triple mental association, which links a note of the scale, a shape, and a syllable. This association can be used to help in reading the music. When a song is first sung by a shape note group, they normally sing the syllables (reading them from the shapes) to solidify their command over the notes. Next, they sing the same notes to the words of the music.

The syllables and notes of a shape note system are relative rather than absolute; they depend on the key of the piece. The first note of a major key always has the triangular Fa note, followed (ascending) by Sol, La, etc. The first note of a minor key is always La, followed by Mi, Fa, etc.

The first three notes of any major scale – fa, sol, la – are each a tone apart. The fourth to sixth notes are also a tone apart and are also fa, sol, la. The seventh and eighth notes, being separated by a semitone, are indicated mi-fa. This means that just four shapenotes can adequately reflect the "feeling" of the whole scale.

== Four-shape vs. seven-shape systems ==
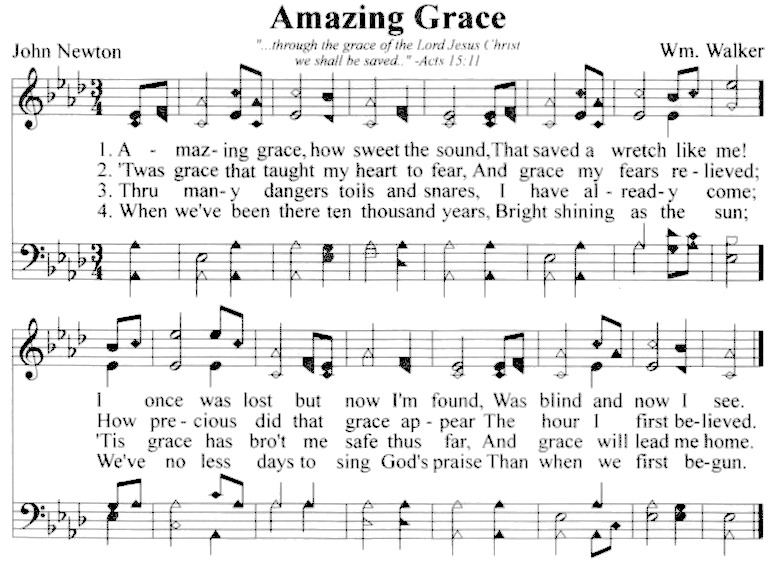
The 7-note system as used in a modern Independent Fundamental Baptist church hymnal from the South.

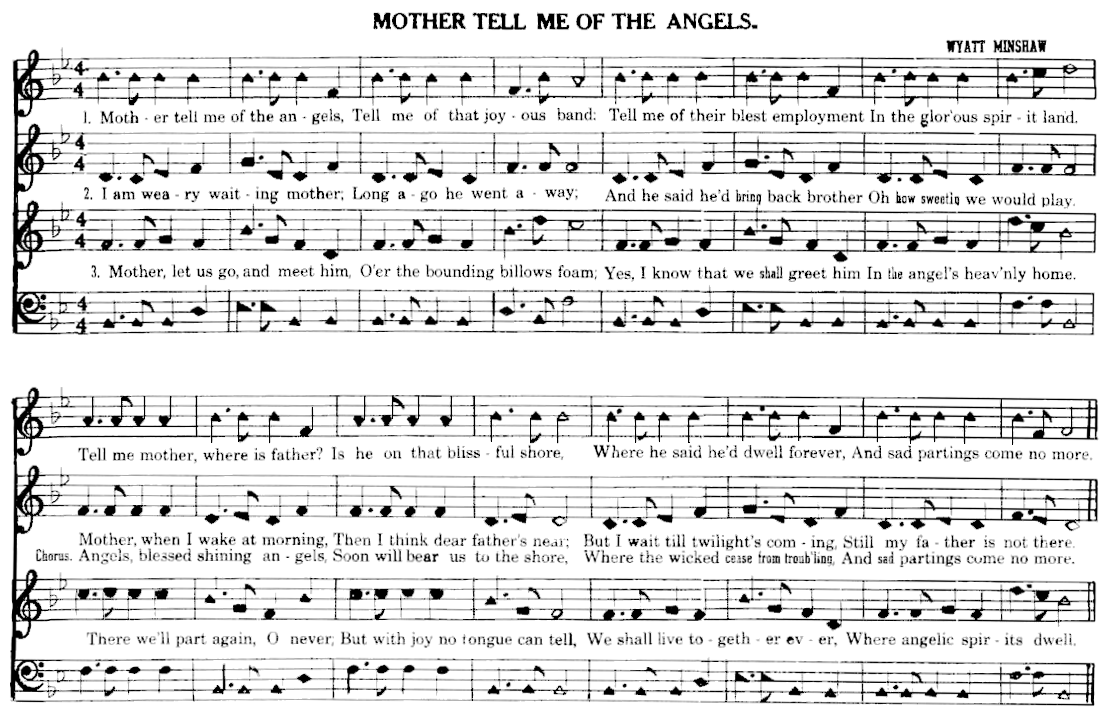
The 7-note system as used in a traditional tunebook (the Christian Harmony).

The system illustrated above is a four-shape system; six of the notes of the scale are grouped in pairs assigned to one syllable/shape combination. The ascending scale using the fa, so, la, fa, so, la, mi, fa syllables represent a variation of the hexachord system introduced by the 11th century monk Guido of Arezzo, who originally introduced a six-note scale using the syllables ut, re, mi, fa, sol, la.

The four syllable variation of Guido's original system was prominent in 17th century England, and entered the US in the 18th century. Shortly afterward, shapes were invented to represent the syllables. (see below). The other important systems are seven-shape systems, which give a different shape and syllable to every note of the scale. Such systems use as their syllables the note names "do, re, mi, fa, so, la, ti, do" (familiar to most people due to the song "Do-Re-Mi" from The Sound of Music). A few books (e.g., "The Good Old Songs" by C. H. Cayce) present the older seven-note syllabification of "do, re, mi, fa, so, la, si, do". In the seven-shape system invented by Jesse B. Aikin, the notes of a C major scale would be notated and sung as follows:

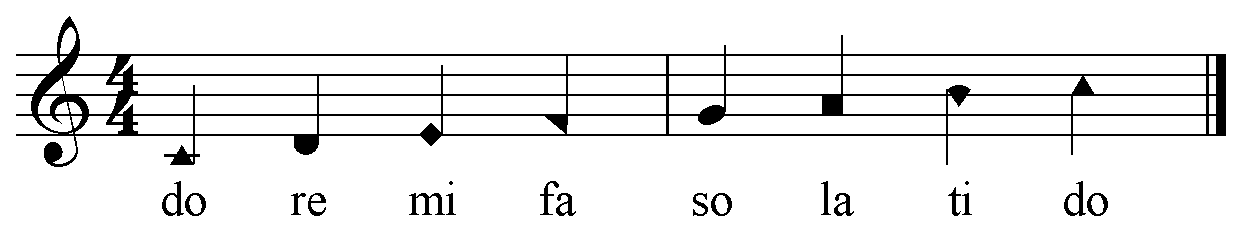

There are other seven-shape systems.

Star in the east
"Star in the east" done with four-syllable solfege syllables.

== Effectiveness of shape notes ==
A controlled study on the usefulness of shape notes was carried out in the 1950s by George H. Kyme with an experimental population consisting of fourth- and fifth-graders living in California. Kyme took care to match his experimental and control groups as closely as possible for ability, quality of teacher, and various other factors. He found that the students taught with shape notes learned to sight read significantly better than those taught without them. Kyme additionally found that the students taught with shape notes were also far more likely to pursue musical activities later on in their education.

== Shape notes and modulation ==
Many forms of music in the common practice period employ modulation, that is, a change of key in mid-piece. Since the 19th century, most choral music has employed modulation, and since the key change is easy for instruments but difficult for singers, the new tonality is usually established by instrumental accompaniment; accordingly, the choir will also sing in the temperament of the instrument rather than the just intonation of the human voice. Modulation is sometimes said to be problematic for shape-note systems, since the shapes employed for the original key of the piece no longer match the scale degrees of the new key; but the ability to use of sharp and flat symbols along with shape notes is a matter of the range of sorts available to the typographer and musical preferences. The development of musical preferences is partly documented by surviving copies of B.F. White's Organ from the 1850s.

Justin Morgan's "Judgment Anthem", which first appeared in shapes in Little and Smith's The Easy Instructor (1801), appears to shift keys (and key signatures) from E minor to E♭ major, then back to E minor before concluding in E♭ major. Morgan, however, may be supposed to have intended simply a shift from major to minor while maintaining the same tonic pitch. It was reprinted in many of the early shape note tunebooks, but not in the Sacred Harp (1844), in which Jeremiah Ingalls's "Christian Song" is the only song that modulates (in this case, from D minor to D major).

== Origin and early history ==
As noted above, the syllables of shape-note systems greatly antedate the shapes. The practice of singing music to syllables designating pitch goes back to about AD 1000 with the work of Guido of Arezzo. Other early work in this area includes the cipher notation of Jean-Jacques Rousseau (18th century), and the tonic sol-fa of Sarah Anna Glover and John Curwen (19th century).

American forerunners to shape notes include the 9th edition of the Bay Psalm Book (Boston), and An Introduction to the Singing of Psalm Tunes in a Plaine & Easy Method by Reverend John Tufts. The 9th edition of the Bay Psalm Book was printed with the initials of four-note syllables (fa, sol, la, me) underneath the staff. In his book, Tufts substituted the initials of the four-note syllables on the staff in place of note heads, and indicated rhythm by punctuation marks to the right of the letters.

Compositions of the "Yankee tunesmiths" ("First New England School") began to appear in 1770, prior to the advent of shape notes, which first appeared in The Easy Instructor by William Little and William Smith in 1801 in Philadelphia. Little and Smith introduced the four-shape system shown above, intended for use in singing schools. In 1803 Andrew Law published The Musical Primer, which used slightly different shapes: a square indicated fa and a triangle la, while sol and mi were the same as in Little and Smith. Additionally, Law's invention was more radical than Little and Smith's in that he dispensed with the use of the staff altogether, letting the shapes be the sole means of expressing pitch. Little and Smith followed traditional music notation in placing the note heads on the staff, in place of the ordinary oval note heads. In the end, it was the Little/Smith system that won out, and there is no hymnbook used today that employs the Law system.

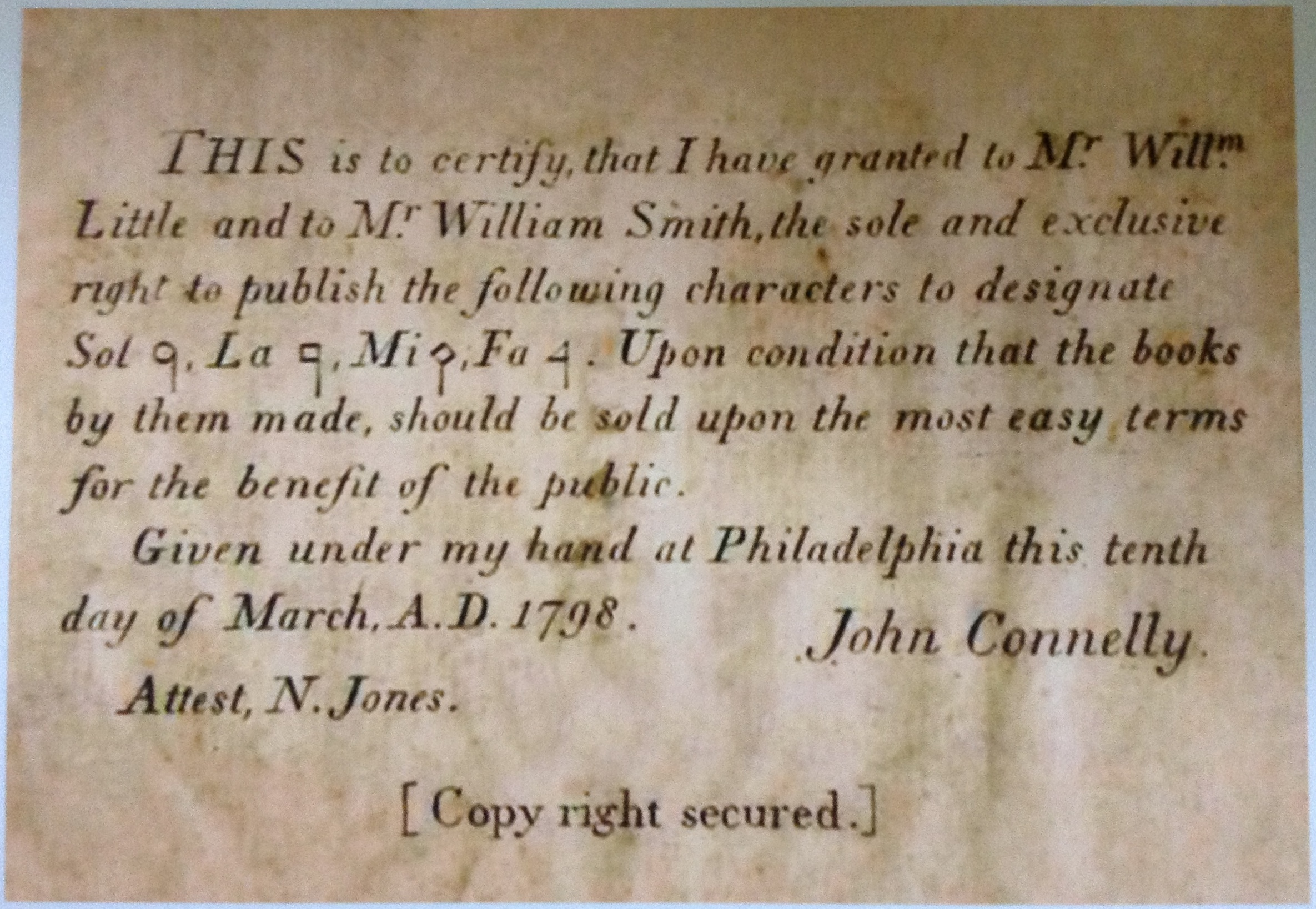
A licence found on the verso of the title page of some copies of Little and Smith's The Easy Instructor, Part II (1803)

Some copies of The Easy Instructor, Part II (1803) included a statement, on the verso of the title page, in which John Connelly (whose name is given in other sources as Conly, Connolly, and Coloney) grants permission to Little and Smith to make use in their publications of the shape notes to which he claimed the rights. Little and Smith did not themselves claim credit for the invention, but said instead that the notes were invented around 1790 by John Connelly of Philadelphia, Pennsylvania. Andrew Law asserted that he was the inventor of shape notes.

Shape notes proved popular in America, and quickly a wide variety of hymnbooks were prepared making use of them. The shapes were eventually extirpated in the northeastern U.S. by a so-called "better music" movement, headed by Lowell Mason. But in the South, the shapes became well entrenched, and multiplied into a variety of traditions. Ananias Davisson's Kentucky Harmony (1816) is the first Southern shape-note tunebook, and was soon followed by Alexander Johnson's Tennessee Harmony (1818), Allen D. Carden's The Missouri Harmony (1820) and many others.

== Rise of seven-shape systems ==
By the middle of the 19th century, the "fa so la" system of four syllables had acquired a major rival, namely the seven-syllable "do re mi" system. Thus, music compilers began to add three more shapes to their books to match the extra syllables. Numerous seven-shape notations were devised. Jesse B. Aikin was the first to produce a book with a seven-shape note system, and he vigorously defended his "invention" and his patent. The system used in Aikin's 1846 Christian Minstrel eventually became the standard. This owes much to the influential Ruebush & Kieffer Publishing Company adopting Aikin's system around 1876. Two books that have remained in continuous (though limited) use, William Walker's Christian Harmony and M. L. Swan's New Harp of Columbia, are still available. These books use seven-shape systems devised by Walker and Swan, respectively.

== Currently active shape note traditions ==
Although seven-shape books may not be as popular as in the past, there are still a great number of churches in the American South, in particular Southern Baptists, Primitive Baptists, almost all of the non-instrumental Churches of Christ, some Free Methodists, Mennonite, some Amish, United Pentecostals, and United Baptists in the Appalachian regions of West Virginia, Ohio and Kentucky, that regularly use seven-shape songbooks in Sunday worship. These songbooks may contain a variety of songs from 18th-century classics to 20th-century gospel music. Thus today denominational songbooks printed in seven shapes probably constitute the largest branch of the shape-note tradition.

In addition, nondenominational community singings are also intermittently held which feature early- to mid-20th century seven-shape gospel music such as Stamps-Baxter hymnals or Heavenly Highway. In these traditions, the custom of "singing the notes" (syllables) is generally preserved only during the learning process at singing schools and singing may be to an instrumental accompaniment, typically a piano.

The seven-shape system is also still used at regular public singings of 19th-century songbooks of a similar type to the Sacred Harp, such as The Christian Harmony and the New Harp of Columbia. Such singings are common in Georgia, North Carolina, Tennessee, Mississippi, and Alabama, and generally preserve the singing school custom of "singing the notes".

The seven-shape (Aikin) system is commonly used by the Mennonites and Brethren. Numerous songbooks are printed in shaped notes for this market. They include Christian Hymnal, the Christian Hymnary, Hymns of the Church, Zion's Praises, Pilgrim's Praises, the Church Hymnal, Silver Gems in Song, the Mennonite Hymnal, and Harmonia Sacra.

Some African-American churches use the seven-shape note system.

Oak Grove Baptist Church, Elba, Alabama, African American 7-shape note gospel singing, 11 October 2003

The four-shape tradition that currently has the greatest number of participants is Sacred Harp singing. Books used in the Sacred Harp tradition include: The Sacred Harp: 2025 Edition, published by the Sacred Harp Publishing Company; (Note: The 2025 Edition replaces the 1991 Edition of the Sacred Harp Publishing Company, but the 1991 Edition is still used by some singing conventions.) The Sacred Harp, 2012 Revised Cooper Edition, published by the Sacred Harp Book Company; and The Sacred Harp, Fourth Edition with Supplement (1911/2007), reprinted by the 2007 J. L. White Edition Committee. In addition, there are many other four-shape traditions that are still active or even enjoying a resurgence of interest. Among the four-shape systems, the Southern Harmony has remained in continuous use at one singing in Benton, Kentucky, and is now experiencing a small amount of regrowth. The current reawakening of interest in shape note singing has also created new singings using other recently moribund 19th-century four-shape songbooks, such as The Missouri Harmony, as well as new books by modern composers, such as the Northern Harmony. Of a hybrid nature, in terms of reviving Ananias Davisson's Kentucky Harmony but taking the further step of incorporating songs from 70 other early tunebooks, along with new compositions, is the Shenandoah Harmony (2013). Thomas B. Malone has specialized in the revival of works by Jeremiah Ingalls, and has published a four-shape edition of Ingalls' 1805 The Christian Harmony. Malone organizes an annual mid-July singing in Newbury, Vermont, where Ingalls was a tavern-keeper and musician between 1789 and 1810.

== See also ==
- Fuguing tune
- Southern gospel
- West gallery music

== Bibliography ==
=== Books ===
- Chase, Gilbert, America's Music: From the Pilgrims to the Present.
- Cobb, Buell E jr (2001), The Sacred Harp: A Tradition and Its Music, University of Georgia Press.
- Drummond, R. Paul (n.d.) A Portion for the Singers: A History of Music Among Primitive Baptists Since 1800.
- Eastburn, Kathryn (n.d.) A Sacred Feast: Reflections on Sacred Harp Singing and Dinner on the Ground.
- Eskew, Harry; McElrath, Hugh T. (1980). Sing with Understanding: An Introduction to Christian Hymnology. Nashville, Tennessee: Broadman Press. ISBN 0-8054-6809-9.
- Goff, James R. (2002). Close harmony : a history of southern gospel. Chapel Hill: University of North Carolina Press. ISBN 9780807853467.
- Horn, Dorothy (1970), Sing to Me of Heaven: A Study of Folk and Early American Materials in Three Old Harp Books, Gainesville: University of Florida Press.
- Jackson, George Pullen (1932), White Spirituals in the Southern Uplands.
- Marini, Stephen A (2003), Sacred Song in America: Religion, Music, and Public Culture, Urbana: University of Illinois Press.
- Stanislaw, Richard J, A Checklist of Four-Shape Shape-Note Tunebooks.
- Hartman, Steve (2005), The Missouri Harmony, or a Choice Collection of Psalm Tunes, Hymns, and Anthems (Wings of Song ed.), St. Louis: Missouri Historical Society, ISBN 1-883982-54-5, xxxvii, 346 pp.

=== Journal articles ===
- Campbell, Gavin James (Spring 1997), "Old Can Be Used Instead of New: Shape-Note Singing and the Crisis of Modernity in the New South, 1880–1910", Journal of American Folklore (article), 110 (436): 169–88, doi:10.2307/541811, JSTOR 541811 investigates the internal debate among shape note singers at the end of the 19th century and beginning of the twentieth.
- Gates, J. Terry (1988). "A comparison of the tune books of Tufts and Walter". Journal of Research in Music Education. 36 (3): 169–93. doi:10.2307/3344638. JSTOR 3344638. S2CID 191348871.
- Lowens, Irving; Britton, Allen P. (Spring 1953). "The Easy Instructor (1798–1831): A history and bibliography of the first shape note tune book" (PDF). Journal of Research in Music Education. I (1): 31–55. doi:10.2307/3344565. hdl:2027.42/68570. JSTOR 3344565. S2CID 145106169.
