= Timeline of music in the United States (1850–1879) =

Timeline of music in the United States
To 1819; 1820–1849; 1850–1879; 1880–1919	1920–1949; 1950–1969; 1970–2000; 2001–present
Music history of the United States
Colonial era – to the Civil War – During the Civil War – Late 19th century – 1900–1940 – 1950s – 1960s – 1970s – 1980s

This timeline of music in the United States covers the period from 1850 to 1879. It encompasses the California Gold Rush, the Civil War and Reconstruction, and touches on topics related to the intersections of music and law, commerce and industry, religion, race, ethnicity, politics, gender, education, historiography and academics. Subjects include folk, popular, theatrical and classical music, as well as Anglo-American, African American, Native American, Irish American, Arab American, Catholic, Swedish American, Shaker and Chinese American music.

== 1850 ==
- The Junius Theater of Nashville, Tennessee opens, one of the then largest stages in the country.
- The California Gold Rush brings the first major influx of European-derived music to the indigenous peoples of the Sierra Nevada and northern California counties.
- The first American Eisteddfod, a Welsh music and art festival tradition, is held in the United States.
- Isaac B. Woodbury publishes The Dulcimer; or, The New York Collection of Sacred Music, one of the most successful collections of Christian songs of the era.
- One of the biggest musical stars of the day, Swedish singer Jenny Lind, demands the unheard-of sum of $187,000 from promoter P.T. Barnum to go on a national concert tour. Barnum raises the money, and promotes her so successfully that an estimated thirty thousand people arrived to watch her ship land in New York Harbor, and the tour is a great financial success. Lind first performs at Castle Gardens in New York.
- Louis Moreau Gottschalk composes "The Last Hope", his most popular song. It will later become a staple of film scores, often used to accompany death scenes.
- The Luca Family performs at an abolitionist meeting in New York, then goes on to become the most prominent African American singing family of the kind inspired by the white Hutchinson Family.
- The first theater opens in San Francisco, California.
- The Slippery Noodle opens in Indianapolis, Indiana. As of 2009, it is the oldest bar in Indiana and a prominent regional blues venue.
- Stephen Foster's "Gwine to Run All Night", or "De Camptown Races", becomes a minstrel show hit, helping to launch Foster's career; he would go on to become the most famous songwriter of the 19th century, and the first "full-time popular songwriter". He also composed Angelina Baker in this year.
- Henry Wehrmann and his wife become the most prominent engravers in the Southern music publishing industry.
- Self-consciously old-fashioned concerts, in period dress, presenting the music of the colonial-era United States become popular; they are known as Old Folks Concerts, and are first organized by Robert Kemp.
- The San Francisco opera tradition begins in 1850 and boasts international stars and a lively set of local performers by the middle of the decade.
- Popular songs become more "haunting and mawkish, the forerunner of the modern 'hurtin'' songs".

== 1851 ==
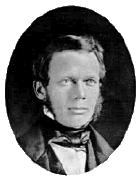
Lewis Henry Morgan, first ethnologist to perform a study of northeastern Native Americans.

- Community brass bands have spread across the country, even to rural Columbia, California, where a local brass band greets the arrival of the first white woman in the town.
- Ex-slave Elizabeth Greenfield begins performing in Buffalo, New York, under the sponsorship of the Buffalo Musical Association. She subsequently tours across North America, becoming popularly known as the Black Swan, the country's first black concert singer.
- Lewis Henry Morgan conducts the first ethnographic study of the Native Americans of the Northeast United States.
- Music education is first introduced into the public school systems of Cleveland, Ohio and San Francisco, California.
- Stephen Foster's "Old Folks at Home" is published; it will become his most popular and remains perhaps his best-known composition.
- Theodore Eisfeld begins a series of concerts that will play a major part in introducing public chamber music concerts to New York City.
- The first opera performed in San Francisco is Vincenzo Bellini's La sonnambula, performed by a troupe led by an Italian tenor formerly employed in Peru and Chile.

== 1852 ==
- The first Cantonese opera performed in the United States premiers in San Francisco, performed by the Hong Fook Tong Chinese Dramatic Company.
- A fire destroys the Boston factory of Chickering and Sons, the market leader in the American piano manufacturing industry, it will be rebuilt to be the largest building in the country after the United States Capitol building.
- Dwight's Journal of Music, an influential periodical, is first published in Boston. One of its contributors is Alexander Wheelock Thayer, who will go on to become the first North American "scholar to undertake studies of music history based on criticism of primary sources".
- The Bostonian Eliza Biscaccianti and the Irishborn Catherine Hayes are the first in a series of star singers to make the fledgling San Francisco opera tradition among the most prominent in the country.
- The melody for the song that would eventually be known as "John Brown's Body" is composed by William Steffe. It will become the unofficial theme song for African American servicemen during the Civil War. The song is spread by the Twelfth Massachusetts Regiment.
- Music education is first introduced into the public school system of St. Louis, Missouri.
- A Sacred Repository of Anthems and Hymns, the first Shaker hymnal to feature tunes, is published in Canterbury, New Hampshire.

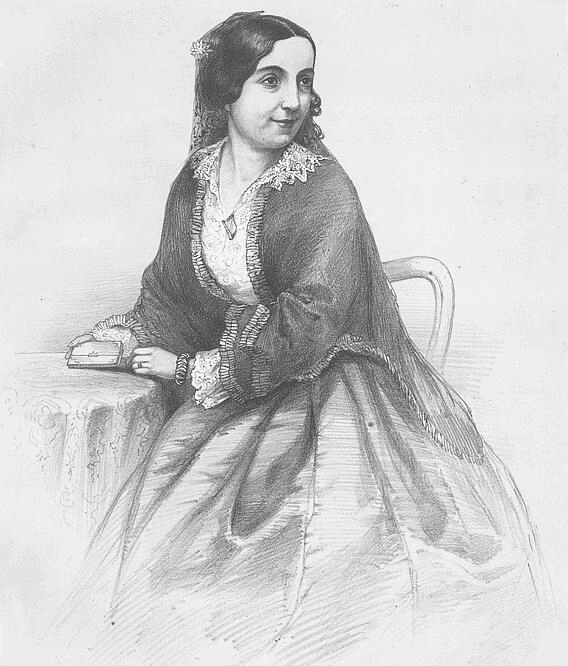
Catherine Hayes, one of the early stars of San Francisco opera

== 1853 ==
- Brooks K. Mould releases "Garden City Polka", the first copyrighted music published in Chicago. This is the beginning of that city's publishing industry.
- Firth, Pond & Company publish The Brass Band Journal, which includes the first band music to use the saxhorn.
- Frederick Law Olmsted gives one of the earliest depictions of an African American field holler, describing it as "a long, loud musical shout, rising and falling, and breaking into a crescendo... like a bugle call".
- George F. Root, William Bradbury and Lowell Mason organize the first Normal Musical Institute, a school offering training for music teachers, located in New York. Root and Bradbury, with Thomas Hastings and Timothy Mason, collaborate on The Shawm, a popular collection of church music which they advertise as selling more in its first year of release than "any previous similar publication".
- Louis Antoine Jullien, a French conductor, forms an orchestra in New York, to great acclaim; his prominent use of the quadrille helps to spur the development of sheet music for that dance.
- Louis Gottschalk begins his concert career in the United States, already a renowned composer from his work in Europe.
- The first opera performed in Chicago is Lucia de Lammermoor.
- Virtuoso Norwegian violinist Ole Bull attracts an unprecedented 10,000 people to a concert in Memphis, Tennessee.
- Phillip Werlein enters the music publishing business in New Orleans. He will go on to become one of the principal publishers of that city in the mid-19th century.
- Stephen Foster's "My Old Kentucky Home, Good Night" represents a radical shift in his approach to composition, abandoning the use of dialect and imparting a "blatant message (that) undoubtedly affect(s) working-class minstrel show audiences (who) would soon be called on to shed their blood to bring about the end of slavery in the United States".
- William Henry Fry's Santa Claus: Christmas Symphony is first performed. It is a controversial piece, and is probably the first American composition to use the saxophone. It also uses special effects that will not become common elements in such pieces until the following century, including a toy trumpet, sleigh bells, a whip, and the use of a double bass to make the sound of howling wind and a dying traveler.

Mid 1850s music trends
- Minstrel shows begin their second decade of popularity growing towards a "more limited, stereotyped portrayal of black characters."
- Saxhorns come to dominate the music of military bands.

== 1854 ==
- The English singer Anna Thillon stars in a series of opera performances in San Francisco, in the city's first professional season. A local Italian opera company forms as well, performing fourteen operas, half of them by the rising composer Giuseppe Verdi.
- A Syrian settling in Brooklyn is apocryphally said to be the first Arab to permanently move to the United States, thus beginning the Arab American musical tradition.
- Twelve-year-old Augustus Meyers enlists in the Army. His account of the School of Practice for Army bandsmen on Governors Island in New York, published in Ten Years in the Ranks, U.S. Army, is the first description of that School.
- Members of the New England Emigrant Aid Company, led by a young man named Forest Savage, form a band in Lawrence, Kansas. This is said to be the beginning of the documented music history of Kansas.
- Victor-Eugene McCarty, one of the first of several prominent free black composers in New Orleans, publishes Fleurs de salon: 2 Favorite Polkas.
- William A. Hodgdon moves to St. Louis, Missouri, where he will pioneer the use of music in that area's public schools.

== 1855 ==
- The Board of Music Trade of the United States, a trade cartel, is formed by the twenty-five biggest music publishing companies in the country, instituting price controls on sheet music for European classical music, which will remain in place until 1885. The Board will also fight music teachers, who sell sheet music to their students.
- George F. Bristow's Rip Van Winkle is said to be the first successful opera on an American subject, Washington Irving's short story Rip Van Winkle. It is also the first American opera based on a subject by a contemporaneous author.

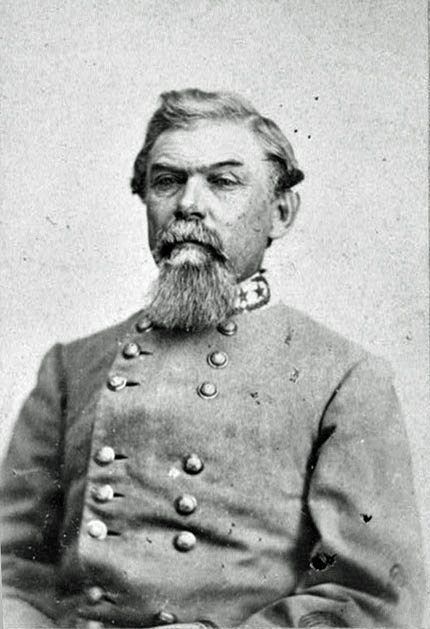
William Joseph Hardee

- Henry Wadsworth Longfellow publishes a long poem called The Song of Hiawatha, which sparks a surge of interest in Native American culture; this helps to inspire many later attempts at fusing elements of Native American and European-derived musics. Longfellow's work inspires many composers like Charles Crozat Converse's "The Death of Minnehaha".
- Louis Grunewald, one of the major music publishers of the Civil War era in New Orleans, enters the business for the first time.
- William Joseph Hardee publishes a two volume manual Rifle and Light Infantry Tactics: For the Exercise and Manoeuvres of Troops When Acting as Light Infantry or Riflemen. It contains the "General Calls" that will signal all the important events in daily military camp life for both the Confederate and Union armies in the coming Civil War.

== 1856 ==
- W.C. Peters and Son, a music publishing company, releases a collection of hymns that is the first such collection published in the American Midwest.

== 1857 ==
- Edmond Dédé is possibly the first black North American to graduate from the Paris Conservatory.
- Joseph William Postlewaite, a free African American, begins leading bands in the St. Louis area, also composing several pieces, including the popular "St. Louis Greys Quick Step".
- Louisville, Kentucky becomes the first city in the country to include music education in the primary grades.
- Oliver Ditson's music publishing business begins collaborating with John C. Haynes; the duo will be one of the major publishers of the American Civil War, and will boast of publishing half of the songs printed in the country in the 1870s.
- The National Association of Music Teachers is formed.

Late 1850s music trends
- The Grecian bend dance fad flourishes across much of the United States.
- At New York's Academy of Music, Max Maratzek leads an effort that will create the first permanent home for opera in New York City.
- The Swedish Lutheran Publication Society and the periodical Det Rátta Hemlandet begin publishing Swedish hymns and secular songs.

== 1858 ==
- Dan Emmett, one of the major composers of minstrel songs, begins his career with Bryant's Minstrels.
- Root & Cady, a Chicago-based music publishing firm, is founded. It will become the most successful publishing company in the North during the Civil War, and will publish most of the popular songs of the war.
- William Walker's Southern Harmony contains a song consisting of the text from John Newton's "Amazing Grace" and the tune of the traditional song "New Britain"; this will go on to become one of the most famous songs of the American folk repertoire.

== 1859 ==
- "Dixie", a song by Dan Emmett premiers onstage in New York, soon becoming a rallying cry for both sides of the Civil War. The song will eventually become an iconic symbol of the South.
- James Hungerford, in his novel, The Old Plantation, and What I Gathered There in an Autumn Month, becomes one of the first to transcribe a melody from an African American slave song, a "boat song" from Southern Maryland.
- Patrick Gilmore, an Irish American bandleader, debuts his band in New York; the ensemble's professional and grandiose performances will make it one of the most popular of the Civil War era.

== 1860 ==
Early 1860s music trends
- Music and theater in the South suffer, both in the lead-up to and initial stages of the Civil War, as few Southerners patronize performances. In particular, opera suffers as many opera managers and performers moved to Europe for the duration.
- Johann Sebastian Bach's organ music grows in popularity as well, due in no small part to the work of John Knowles Paine.

- Armand Blackmar and his brother, Henry, open a music publishing business in New Orleans. They will become one of the most prominent Southern publishing houses during the Civil War. This year also sees the entry into the publishing business of John Schreiner of Macon, Georgia, the most adventurous publisher of the war era.
- "The First Gun Is Fired! May God Protect the Right!" by George Frederick Root is inspired by the Battle of Fort Sumter, the first fighting of the American Civil War. The song is published only three days after the attack.
- With the death of Joch C. Walker, his company becomes known as Evans & Cogswell, the most important lithographer and printer in the Confederacy.
- San Francisco is home to 145 opera performances, making this year a watershed for opera, both in San Francisco and in the United States. An estimated 217,000 seats were sold in the year, in a city with a population of about 60,000. This level of popularity is unheard of in any North American city at any point in history.
- "The Palmetto State Song" is published, first of "what was to become the Confederate music collection". It is the first published Confederate sheet music.

== 1861 ==
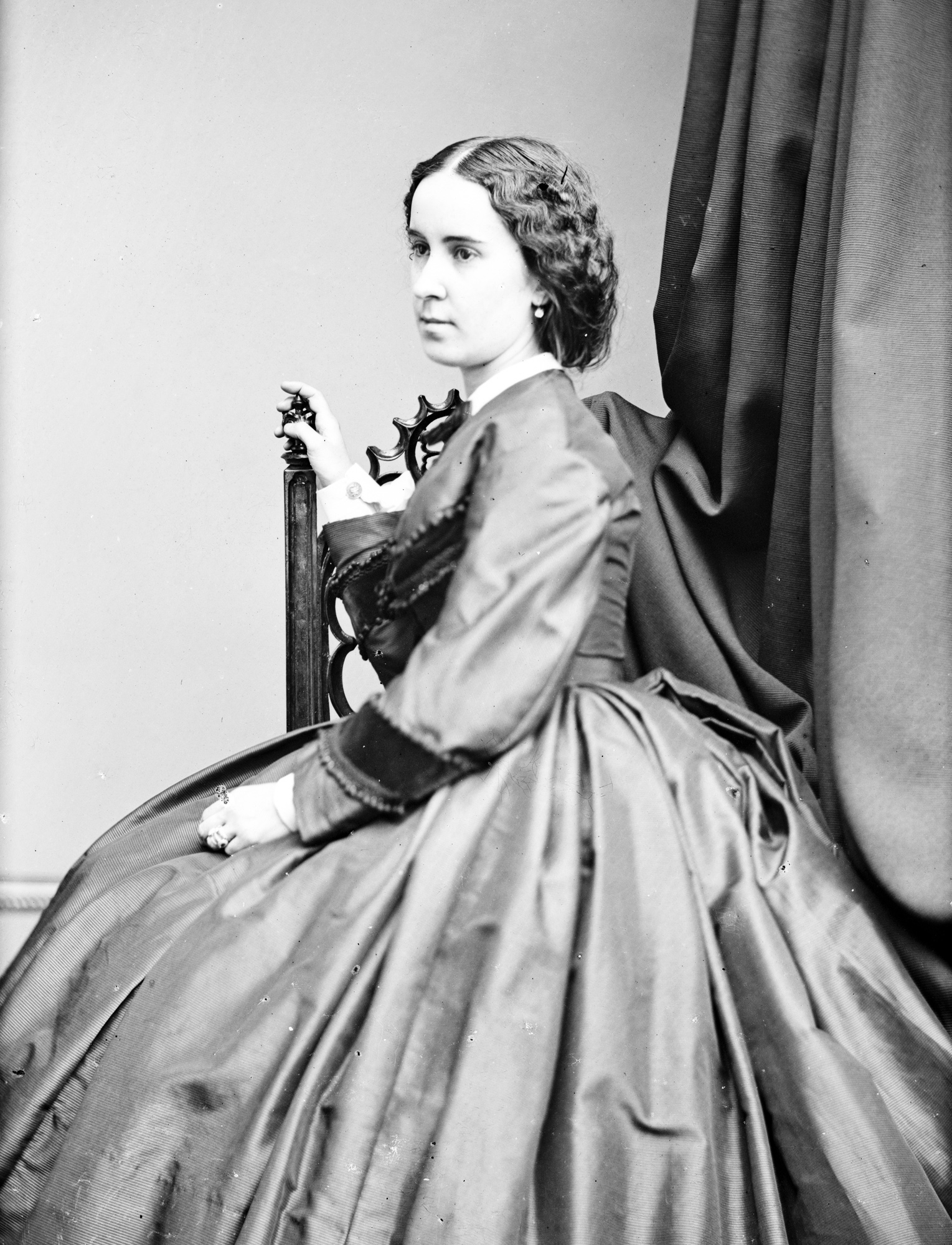
Clara Louise Kellogg, a prominent American vocalist.

- The American Civil War begins. Before it ends, it will have a profound impact on American music, spurring the publishing of patriotic songs on both sides, the migration of African Americans, and their styles and instruments, to new locales and the mixing of the musics of many peoples and regions in diverse military units. The Civil War will also stimulate the production of brass instruments and drums.
- The Battle of First Manassas is among a number of early Southern victories that are "confidently celebrated in broadsides and sheet music, no matter how insignificant the outcome". Other important victories include the Battle of Wilson's Creek and the Battle of Belmont.
- Clara Louise Kellogg, a professional soloist, debuts at the New York Academy of Music, soon becoming a company manager and major figure in American opera history.
- Thomas Baker publishes the first "sheet-music publication of any black spiritual", Song of the Contrabands. Harriet Tubman's "Go Down, Moses" is the first spiritual published with music in the United States. It is also the most famous contraband song, or those spirituals which refugee slaves (contrabands) brought to Fortress Monroe, Virginia; for many white northerners, these songs became their first significant contact with spirituals.
- Harry Macarthy writes "The Bonnie Blue Flag", which becomes a popular Confederate anthem after he performs it for the Texas Rangers and other soldiers at the Academy of Music in New Orleans. The success of the song and his "Personation Concerts", which feature impersonations of dialects and accents, made him the "best-known and best-loved entertainer of the Civil War"
- A fire destroys Hibernian Hall, the major theater of the city of Charleston, South Carolina; though the Hall is rebuilt, it never regains its former reputation.
- The most comprehensive collection of hymns in American history, Hymns Ancient and Modern, is first published. By the time its second edition is released in 1875, it will be by far the dominant Anglican hymnal in the country.
- A secessionist attack on Union troops in Baltimore inspire James Ryder Randall to write "Maryland, My Maryland". The song became perhaps the most enduring of the era and reflects the bitter partisanship of border states like Maryland. It is eventually chosen as the state song of Maryland. The song is set to music later that year by members of the Baltimore Glee Club, including the prominent pro-Confederate Cary family, most famously Hetty Cary. During the attack, the military musicians drop their instruments and flee. Four bandsmen die, the first such casualties of the Civil War.
- Jefferson Davis is inaugurated President of the Confederacy in Montgomery, Alabama. Local bandleader Hermann Arnold, adapts "Dixie" into a military quickstep for the event. The song energizes the crowd, and Davis concludes that "Dixie" should be the national anthem for the Confederacy. Notable alternative versions are soon proffered, including the defiant "war song" version of Albert Pike and one by Henry Troop Stanton, known at the time as the "Poet Laureate of Kentucky". A number of popular songs are published later in the year, celebrating Davis, most famously including "Our First President's Quickstep".
- The Northern Army, having already occupied Port Royal, South Carolina, sends an educational mission to care for the large African American population; Lucy McKim Garrison is among the northern visitors, and her study is the "first account of (African American spirituals) that attempted to describe some of their characteristic features". Her work will later be used in the influential collection Slave Songs of the United States.
- Congress authorizes the hiring of musicians in varying amounts for infantry, cavalry and artillery units in the U.S. Army.

== 1862 ==
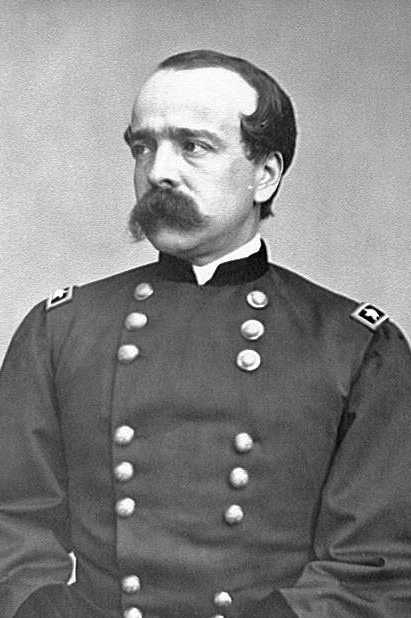
General Dan Butterfield, composer of "Taps", after the bloody Seven Days Battles. of the Civil War

- "The Battle Hymn of the Republic", with words by Julia Ward Howe, is first published; it, and "Battle Cry of Freedom" by George Frederick Root, become perhaps the most influential pro-Union songs of the Civil War.
- The Confederate government institutes conscription, leading to a number of songs that negatively described the conscripts as having a tendency to desert and act cowardly in battle.
- Union general Dan Butterfield composes the modern melody known as "Taps", after the Seven Days Battles; this is the only new field music to appear during the Civil War.
- To reassert Northern ownership of the song, "Dixie", which is wildly popular in both the North and the South and claimed as a patriotic anthem in both areas, is incorporated into this year's reissue of The Drummer's and Fifer's Guide, the unofficial manual for field music in the Union army.
- George F. Root writes "Just Before the Battle, Mother", the most popular of many Civil War era songs that focus on the love of a soldier for his mother; the song is first published only in the North, but becomes popular in the South too after being published there in 1865. The song, along with "Battle Cry of Freedom", "The Vacant Chair" and "Tramp, Tramp, Tramp (or the Prisoner's Hope)", become among Root's most enduring, and among the most popular of the Civil War.
- Hood's Minstrels build themselves a log cabin theater to perform in, and become the best-known of the amateur Confederate military bands of the Civil War.
- John Williamson Palmer writes and publishes anonymously the popular song "Stonewall Jackson's Way", which celebrates General Stonewall Jackson.
- The song "Maryland, My Maryland", though still a popular rallying cry for Confederate soldiers and sympathizers, endures a backlash that relegates it to a second tier Confederate anthem (compared to the other two major contenders, "Dixie" and "Bonnie Blue Flag") after it becomes apparent that Maryland will not join the Confederacy, both due to a lack of support in much of the state and the ending of the Southern invasion of Maryland with the Battle of Antietam.
- William Miller and Joseph R. Beacham form Miller & Beacham after purchasing the music publishing firm originally formed by John Cole in Baltimore; the company will published many of the most popular Confederate songs during the Civil War.
- The Richmond Theater, the most important concert stage in Richmond, Virginia, burns down. Concerts immediately moved to the nearby Franklin Hall.
- Root & Cady publishes The Silver Lute, the first music book printed in Chicago. It will go on to be used in the Chicago school system.
- Popular Confederate sheet music and broadsides switch from grandly celebrating the South's early victories to laments that heralded "martial deeds (but also) began to eulogize sacrifice" after a series of setbacks, including the bloody stalemate at Shiloh. Very few victories are celebrated in Southern song after the defeat at the Battle of Fredericksburg.
- Congress abolishes regimental bands in the U.S. Army to cut costs, replacing them with brigade bands. The pay and rank of bandsmen is reduced as well.
- Will S. Hays, a popular Kentuckian songwriter, publishes "The Drummer Boy of Shiloh", an important work influenced by Irish and Italian songs.

Mid 1860s music trends
- American bands begin touring widely across the country, a practice formerly associated mostly with renowned European performers.
- The Civil War leads to greater female participation in music throughout the nation, in part due to the absence of male performers and managers fighting in the war. Other factors include the precedent-setting wave of English female composers during the same era, the growth in recognition for the composers of parlor songs and dances and the birth of a specialized wave of magazines and other businesses catering to female clientele.
- Major Confederate music publishing houses arise throughout the South, including that of Armand Blackmar of New Orleans, and later, Columbus, Georgia, Joseph Block of Mobile, Alabama, and John Schreiner's business headquartered in Macon, Georgia. Other music publishing firms in the South are located in Richmond, Virginia, Augusta, Georgia, Savannah, Georgia, Charleston, South Carolina and Columbia, South Carolina.
- A distinctive Irish-American song tradition takes shape, while the Irish begin to enter the theater business in large numbers.
- Community professional bands begin flourishing across the country. Wind ensembles are especially popular.

== 1863 ==
- The Battle of Galveston leads to a large number of refugees moving to Houston, Texas, establishing that city as a musical and cultural center along the Gulf Coast.
- Bandsmen in the Confederate army are given a raise, and are now paid more than privates and field musicians.
- Influential publisher and lithographer George Dunn enters the music publishing business in Richmond, Virginia, while the publisher Blanton Duncan similarly begins his career in Columbia, South Carolina.
- George F. Root's "The Battle Cry of Freedom" becomes a rallying cry for Union soldiers.
- Henry Tucker and Charles Carroll Sawyer publish "Weeping Sad and Lonely, or When This Cruel War Is Over", becoming one of the best-selling songs of the Civil War among soldiers of both sides. The song is said to be so demoralizing that several commanders ban it completely.
- Though many songs in the early years of the Civil War had praised Jefferson Davis, this practice ended by this year, when "people across the Confederacy were disenchanted with Davis' leadership", rather reserving "their affections for their military leaders, beginning with General P. G. T. Beauregard. General Beauregard is a subject of reverence and the topic of many Confederate songs that celebrate him as a national hero.
- Partisan ranger John Hunt Morgan escapes from a prison in Columbus, Ohio, inspiring numerous Confederate songs and turning Morgan into a folk hero.
- The Southern music publishing industry suffers due to a paper shortage.
- Among the first modern American musicians' organizations is the Musical Mutual Protective Union of New York, a precursor of today's American Federation of Musicians.
- The New Richmond Theater opens in Richmond, Virginia, becoming a major concert stage in the city and rivalling the previous incarnation.
- With the war not going well for Confederate soldiers, popular sheet music and broadsides shifted from upbeat and prideful to encouraging soldiers to "remain resolute, (reminding and worrying) them that they were fighting to protect their loved ones at home".
- Thomas Wentworth Higginson leads the First South Carolina Colored Volunteers, the first group of authorized African American soldiers. Higginson is a notable author who helps popularize many aspects of African American music.

== 1864 ==
- The ever-diminishing food ration of the Confederate army soldier is cut again, leading to a fresh array of songs popular among soldiers and complaining of the poor food situation.
- George F. Root publishes "Tramp! Tramp! Tramp! (The Prisoner's Hope)"; the song is about being a prisoner of war, and is popular among Northern soldiers, selling one hundred thousand copies in six months. This year's "All Quiet Along the Potomac Tonight" by John Hill Hewitt and "Tenting on the Old Camp Ground" by Walter Kittredge are also popular hits.
- General Jeb Stuart is killed at the Battle of Yellow Tavern; Stuart, who was both a "'man's man' admired widely for his courage, and a 'lady's man', the heartthrob of the Confederacy", was a noted banjoist who led his men into battle singing. He was the "most flamboyant figure in the Confederacy".
- Despite the increasingly desperate military position of the South, the capital city of Richmond, Virginia is home to a large amount of merrymaking and festivities, including regular parties held by Jefferson Davis and his wife, Varina.
- Sheet music and broadsides popular among Southerners, especially soldiers, reflect the battered Confederate military efforts, celebrating the sacrifices of Southern soldiers, also stressing the "common bond of sacrifice between men in the field and women at home". Songs described women enduring hardships and learning to endure without the comforts that had previously been ordered from the industrious north.

== 1865 ==
- En route to his second inauguration, Abraham Lincoln is perceived as cowardly sneaking through the city of Baltimore to avoid a potential assassination plot. The incident inspires a number of popular Confederate songs ridiculing Lincoln, whose behavior and appearance are criticized in much of Confederate popular music.
- Benjamin Jepson, one of the first primary school music teachers in the country, leads the introduction of music education into the public school system of New Haven, Connecticut.
- George Bruce and Daniel Emmett publish The Drummers and Fifers Guide, an important pedagogical work of the Civil War.
- The first African American minstrel troupes are formed, beginning with the Georgia Minstrels, led by W. H. Lee and based originally out of Macon, Georgia; the second, and more historically notable line-up, is led by Charles "Barney" Hicks, and tours the Northeast, inspiring a wave of imitators. It will be the most successful black minstrel group.
- The Oberlin College-Conservatory is one of the earliest and most influential music conservatories.
- Theodore Thomas forms an orchestra that he led both artistically and financially, in stark contrast to the norm at the time. Under his leadership, the orchestra is soon viewed as perhaps the best in the country. Thomas will go on to play a "major role in bringing symphonic music to the American people".
- Tony Pastor's Opera House opens, marking the beginning of the development of vaudeville.
- An article entitled "The Negro Dialect" by William Francis Allen in The Nation is one of the first to use the word spiritual in a musical sense.

Late 1860s music trends
- In some urban areas, a cappella Norwegian and Swedish American choruses become commonplace, while Lutheran colleges begin sponsoring concert choirs.

== 1866 ==
- The Black Crook premiers at Niblo's Garden in New York City, using a melodrama and a French ballet troupe whose venue burnt to the ground while they still rehearsed. The "result was an unprecedented triumph", and the show's mixture of "melodrama, dance, music, extraordinary special effects, and mild eroticism... dazzled far beyond any previous theatrical conception". The show is one of the major events in the early history of the extravaganza. Music was credited to Thomas Baker, author of "Transformation Polka". The venue was the managed by the first female theatrical manager in the country.
- George B. Loomis begins teaching music. He will be the first superintendent of music in the Indianapolis public school system, and will publish Loomis' Progressive Music Lessons, a commonly used music education book in Indiana and surrounding states. He will also co-found the Indiana Music Teachers Association, one of the first such organizations in the country.

== 1867 ==
- The Boston Conservatory, New England Conservatory, Chicago Musical College and the Cincinnati Conservatory are all founded.
- Slave Songs of the United States is the first, and most influential, collection of spirituals to be published; the collectors were Northern abolitionists, William Francis Allen, Lucy McKim Garrison and Charles Pickard Ware. It is a "milestone not just in African American music but in modern folk history". It is also the first published collection of African American music of any kind.

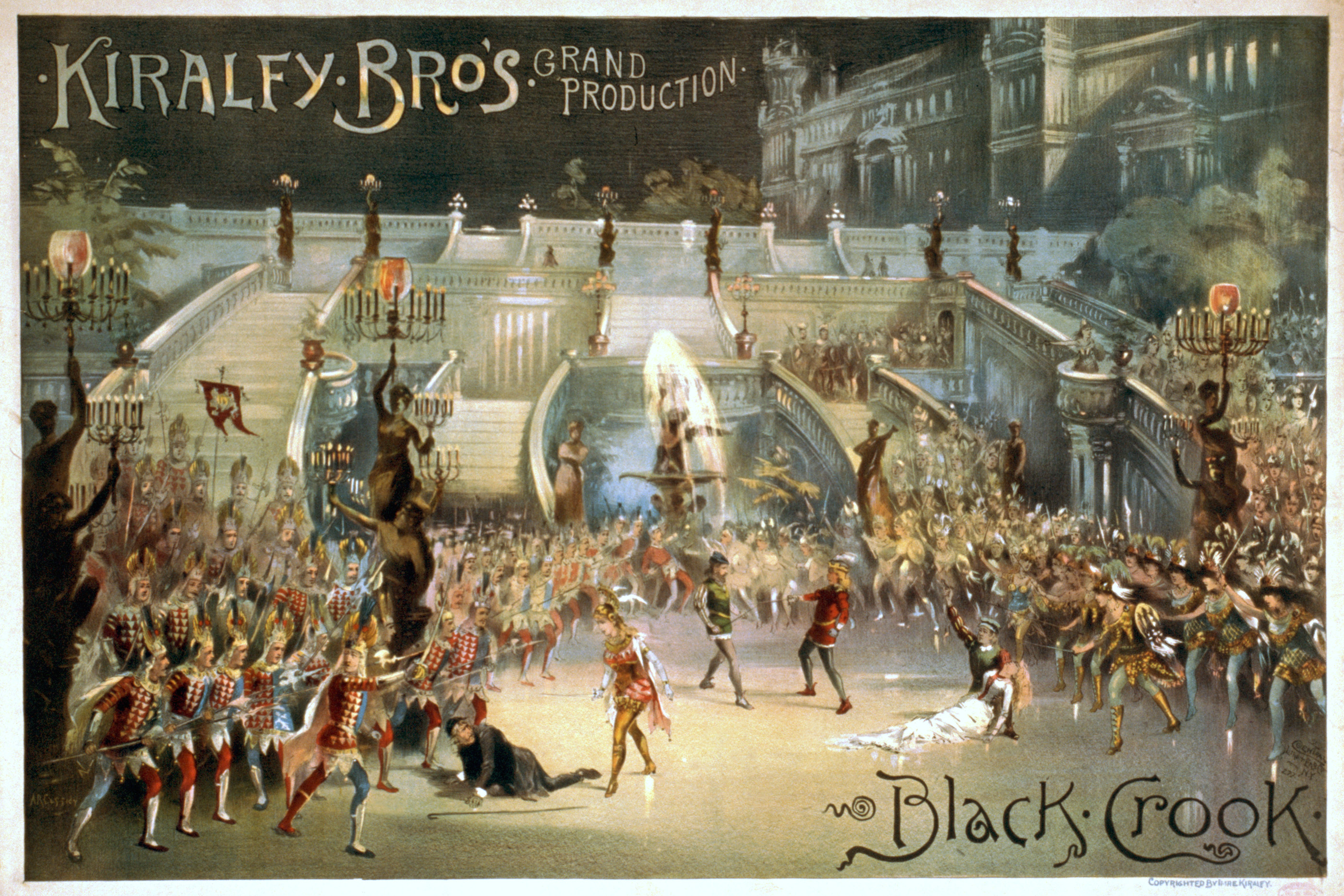
The Black Crook finale

== 1868 ==
- John Thomas Douglass' Virginia's Ball is the first documented opera composed by an African American; it is now lost, but was performed at least once, in New York in this year.
- "Shí naashá is composed to commemorate the Navajos' release from a four-year stretch of imprisonment at Fort Sumner, New Mexico. It will become "probably the best known Navajo song".

== 1869 ==
- Alice Fletcher records a delegation from Leech Lake in Washington, D.C., the first recording of Ojibwe music.
- Lew Johnson organizes his first permanent black minstrel troupe, in St. Louis, Missouri; he will be the most well-regarded minstrel show manager of the era.
- Bandleader Patrick Gilmore organizes a National Peace Jubilee in Boston, featuring more than 11,000 performers - soloists, a choir, an orchestra and others. The event inspired a wave of interest in instrumental music across the country. Music historian Richard Crawford has called this the "high-water mark in the influence of the band in American life".
- Gardiner A. Strubes' Strubes Drum and Fife Instructor is adopted by the U.S. Army as the manual for training field musicians.

Fisk Jubilee Singers

== 1870 ==
- Research by William Dall is the first detailed ethnomusicological study of the indigenous peoples of the Western Arctic.
- A choir forms at the African American Fisk University - the Fisk Jubilee Singers, who will soon begin touring, bringing spirituals to wider audiences.
- The Library of Congress becomes the sole repository for copyrighted works.
- Luther Whiting Mason releases The National Music Course, a set of four books and a chart for educating students in musical notation, which will become one of the standard texts of American music education.
- The Peace Policy places Native American reservations under the control of various Christian denominations, which takes its toll on the culture and music of indigenous peoples.
- Wodziwob, a Northern Paiute prophet, begins preaching the earliest manifestation of the teachings of the Ghost Dance.

Early 1870s music trends
- The success of the Fisk Jubilee Singers, who toured widely in this era, inspires similar jubilee groups at other universities, beginning with the Hampton Institute and the Fairfield Normal Institute.

== 1871 ==
- The Great Chicago Fire destroys hundreds of thousands of dollars' worth of inventory for the Root & Cady music publishing firm, one of the leading publishers since the Civil War. Root & Cady will go bankrupt within a year. The fire will end Chicago's position as one of the centers for music publishing in the country.
- Ned Harrigan helps develop the vaudeville show in New York City.
- Will S. Hays publishes "The Little Old Log Cabin in the Lane", one of the most popular minstrel songs of the era.

== 1872 ==
- Preacher Dwight Moody and singer Ira Sankey, having published a wildly popular series of books entitled Gospel Hymns and Sacred Songs, perform in a series of concerts that establish a religious revival in the urban north. Their travels "firmly (establish) the gospel hymn as an effective song genre for use in Sunday Schools and revival meetings".
- Ned Harrigan and Tony Hart begin a run at the Theatre Comique in New York, marking "their big breakthrough". They will become most famous for the song "The Mulligan Guards", with music by David Braham.

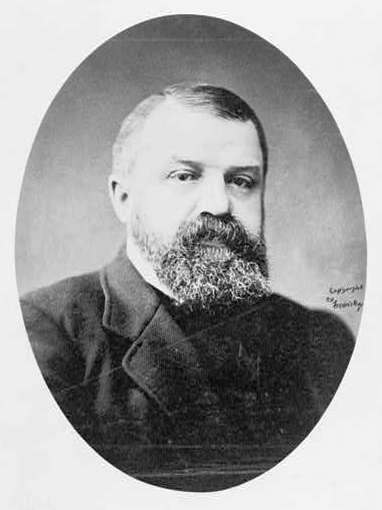
Dwight Moody

- After the Oratorio Society of Chicago is destroyed by a fire, Boston's Handel and Haydn Society sends materials to rebuild the organization, which reforms as the Apollo Club, one of the most famous musical clubs in the United States.
- Theodore Seward begins publishing his arrangements of African American spirituals, in book form like a hymnal, with his publication of Jubilee Songs As Sung by the Jubilee Singers of Fisk University, a collection of spirituals from the repertoire of the Fisk University Jubilee Singers. That group rises to fame in this year after a highly successful concert in Boston during the World's Peace Jubilee and International Musical Festival, the first time African American "singers (are) included in a big musical production" in the country.

== 1873 ==
- San Francisco begins passing laws limiting the use of ceremonial Chinese gongs.
- John Singenberger organizes the American St. Cecilia Society, an important organization in the revival of the Roman Catholic masses and motets of Palestrina. The Society sought "to restore to the liturgy Gregorian chant and polyphony in the style of Palestrina".
- Patrick Gilmore, a popular bandleader, organizes a band for the Twenty-second Regiment of New York, soon becoming the most influential professional music ensemble in the country.
- P. T. Barnum adds an African American jubilee choir to his act, calling himself the first to use a "full band" of African Americans in a "menagerie and circus".
- Barber William T. Benjamin forms the first African American opera company, and the first opera company of any kind in Washington, D.C., based out of a local Roman Catholic church.

Mid 1870s music trends
- Christian songs become a more prominent part of the minstrel show repertoire.

== 1874 ==
- The first educational, and later, musical, convention known as a Chautauqua is held in what is now Chautauqua, New York.
- Evangeline, by Edward E. Rice and J. Cheever Goodwin, a popular Victorian burlesque extravaganza, is the first American production billed as a musical comedy.
- Edward King's travel diary The Great South is finished, with each section published as an article in Scribner's Magazine; it contains many descriptions of African American church music in the South.
- Leopold Damrosch forms the New York Oratorio Society, beginning the musical career of his family, which will extend for three generations.
- Philip Bliss' collection Gospel Songs contains the first use of the term gospel song to describe the music later known as gospel music.

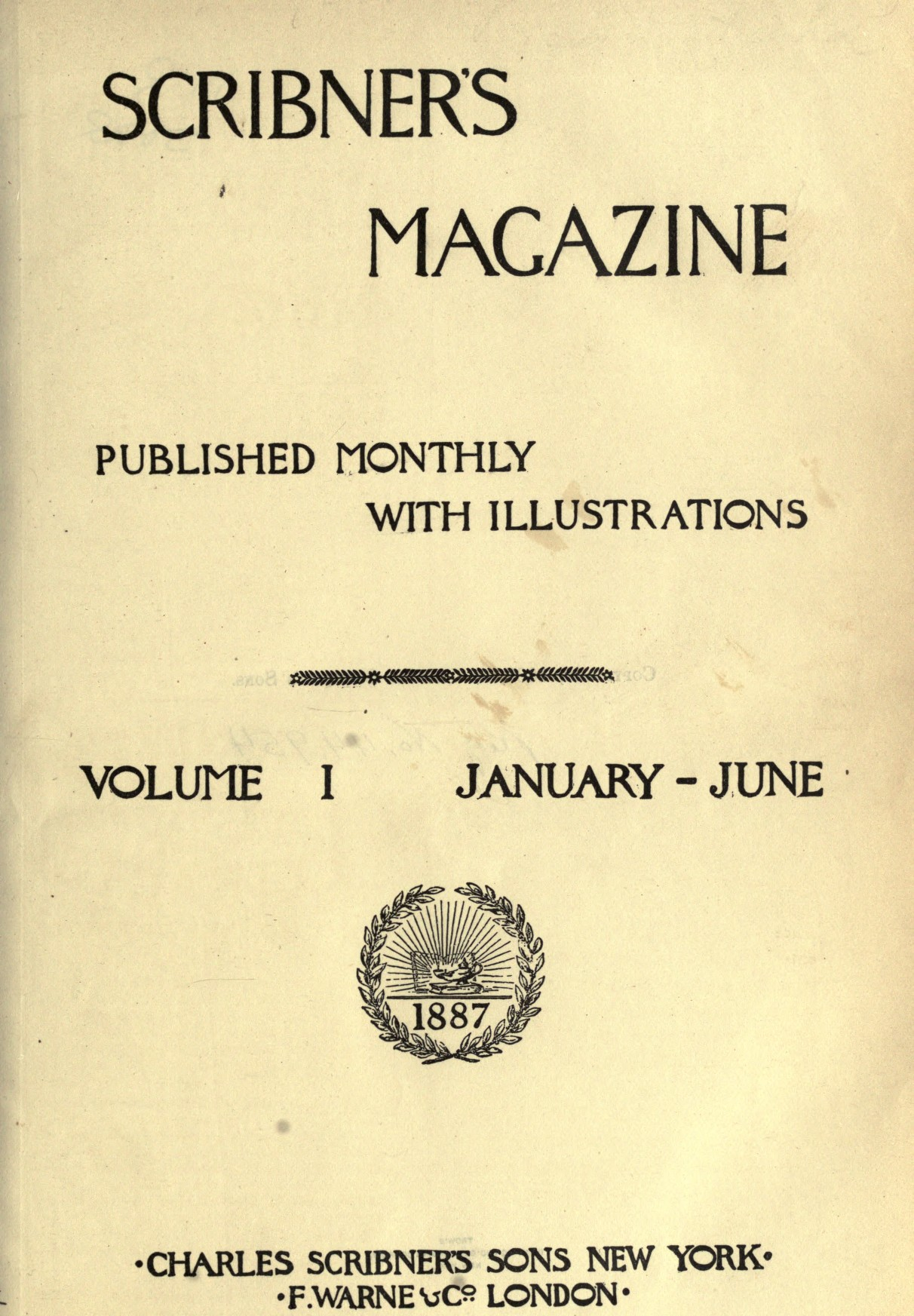
Scribner's Magazine

== 1875 ==
- Henry Clay Work's "My Grandfather's Clock" becomes the "most popular song of the decade", and is said to have sold 800,000 copies.
- African American songwriters like James A. Bland and Sam Lucas begin composing works similar to spirituals, sometimes based, in part, on actual spirituals.
- John Knowles Paine becomes a full professor at Harvard University, the first musician to do so in the United States.
- The Afro-Cuban José Silvestre White becomes the first person of African descent to perform with an American symphony, after he performs with the New York Philharmonic.

== 1876 ==
- "Home on the Range" is first published; it is the earliest song to depict a "romanticized image of the cowboy".
- Sisters Anna and Emma Hyers, and their father, form a concert tour company, Hyers Sisters Comic Opera Co., then work with playwrights Pauline Hopkins and Joseph Bradford to produce the "first full-fledged musical plays... in which African Americans themselves comment on the plight of the slaves and the relief of Emancipation without the disguises of minstrel comedy", with this year's Out of Bondage (also known as Out of the Wilderness).
- David Wallis Reeves adds the countermelody to the military march.
- The Music Teachers National Association, the first major professional organization for music teachers, is founded.

== 1877 ==
Late 1870s music trends
- The golden age of Chinese theatre in the United States begins.

- Sebastian Yradiers "La Paloma" popularizes the habanera in the United States.
- The Dakota Drum Dance is introduced to the Native Americans of the Great Lakes region; this is a set of beliefs that revolve around a legendary woman named Turkey Tailfeather Woman, who is said to have escaped from the American military and received instructions to build and use a large, ceremonial drum while in hiding. The religion based around this drum will spread throughout the region, and the drum itself will become the ancestor of the big drum used in modern powwow ceremonies.
- Thomas Edison invents the technology to record sound, using a tin-foil cylinder phonograph. His first recording is "Mary Had a Little Lamb".

== 1878 ==
- James A. Bland, the most important black minstrelsy songwriter and the first successful black songwriter, publishes a huge hit with "Carry Me Back to Old Virginny", which will become the state song of Virginia in 1940. Bland is the first African American composer whose music is published by a major company.
- James Monroe Trotter publishes Music and Some Highly Musical People, making him the first African American music historian.
- W. S. Gilbert and Arthur Sullivan's H.M.S. Pinafore premiers in the United States, launching a fad for light opera throughout the country.
- Sam Lucas, the "most celebrated minstrel" of the era, becomes the first African American to play Uncle Tom in Uncle Tom's Cabin.

== 1879 ==
- The Bureau of American Ethnology is created at the Smithsonian Institution; the Bureau studies and documents Native American music and culture.
- Ned Harrigan and Tony Hart transition from the variety show to the musical play, with stories centered around characters with distinct ethnic backgrounds. Their work established "ethnic groups as major characters in the American stage".
