= The First Gun Is Fired =

First American Civil War-era song

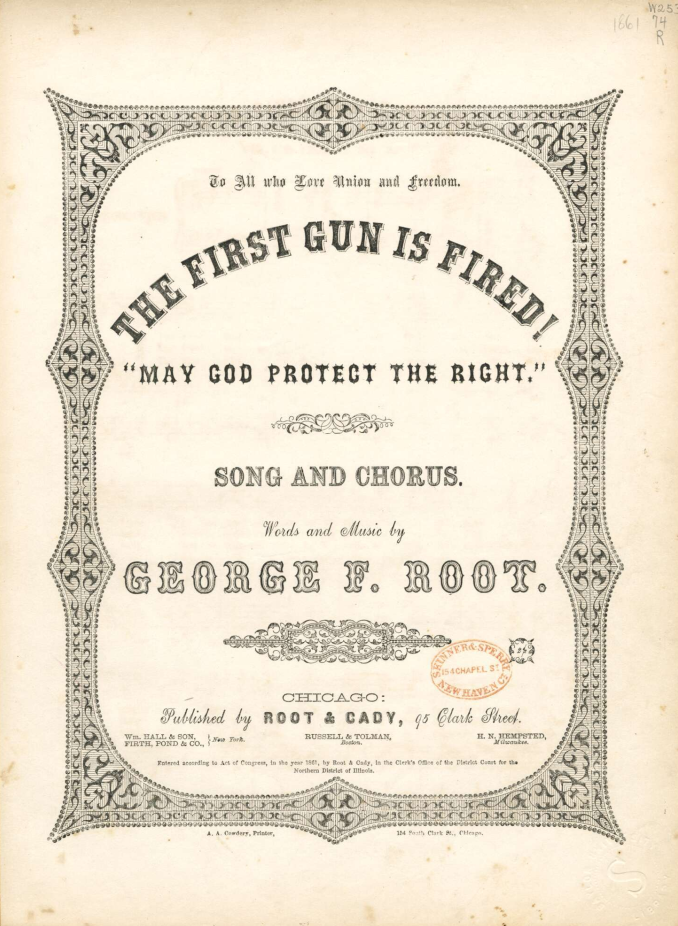
Original 1861 sheet music cover of "The First Gun Is Fired" by Root & Cady

"The First Gun Is Fired, May God Protect the Right" (Note: Also stylized "The First Gun Is Fired! 'May God Protect the Right'".) is a patriotic song written and composed by George Frederick Root in 1861. A response to the attack on Fort Sumter, it is the first song of the American Civil War. It called for "the freeborn sons of the North [to] arise" and "bow no more to the tyrant few."

Prior to the war's onset, Root was already a established musician. He left his mark in nurturing American music education and composing homespun, popular songs that distinctly appealed to the masses. In 1860, Root moved to Chicago to work at Root & Cady, a leading American music store. He would later become its director. Root wrote about topical subjects. When the Civil War broke out, his populist approach to music duly translated into a rousing rallying song, "The First Gun Is Fired".

Published on April 15, the tune met little commercial success. However, it would herald the most successful songwriting career of the Civil War. Root produced the most wartime songs—chief among them, "The Battle Cry of Freedom", the Union's rallying song, and "Tramp! Tramp! Tramp!". He even earned praise from President Abraham Lincoln for his service.

== Background ==
=== Root as a songwriter ===
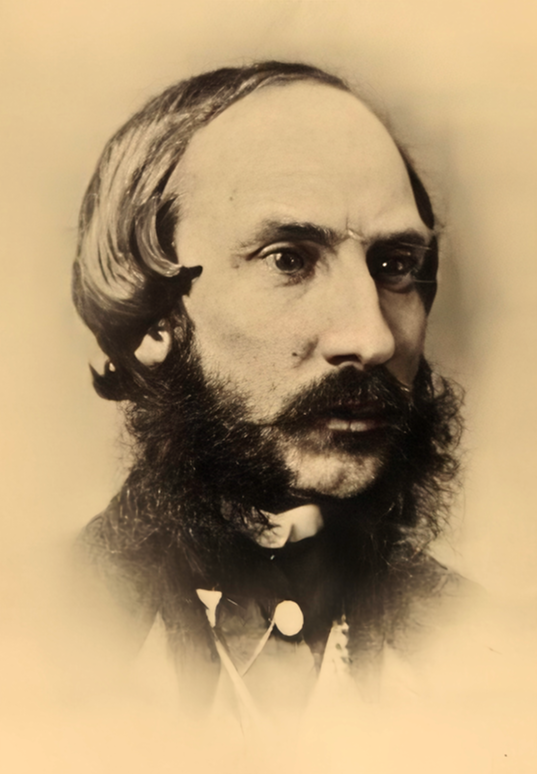
George Frederick Root in 1860, best known for "The Battle Cry of Freedom" and other Unionist compositions

According to writer George Birdseye, Root is a worthy successor to Stephen Foster as the "songwriter of America." Early on, he recognized his musical talent and desired to cultivate it. He left the farm to the big city, Boston, at age eighteen. Root did not have a direct career path to follow yet. However, an opportunity was conferred upon him by A. N. Johnson, a successful organist and music teacher. Johnson was pleased with Root’s talent, offering him a permanent position in his music school. Root quickly managed to make a living. Five years following the partnership’s start, Root was persuaded to move to New York City by Jacob Abbott, principal at Abbott’s Institute (a school). He thereby started providing music lessons at other private institutions, such as Springler's and Rutger's. His first appreciable venture into songwriting was "The Hazel Dell". The tune was so successful that the publishing house, William Hall & Son, promptly signed him up for an exclusive three-year contract. In 1853, Root helped found the Normal Musical Institute, a music teachers' convention of sorts. At the time, he was still, primarily, a music teacher, but the passion for songwriting demanded that he spend more time on independent creations.

In 1860, he became a partner of Root & Cady; his entry "immediately effected an increase of business and popularity to an already well-established house." Root's greatest contributions, and those that reaped most reward, were his Civil War-era songs. In Birdseye’s words, they "both fired and solaced the Northern heart during that war." He composed over thirty war songs, and rivalled even Stephen Foster in terms of popularity. Root published over two hundred songs.

=== Outbreak of war ===
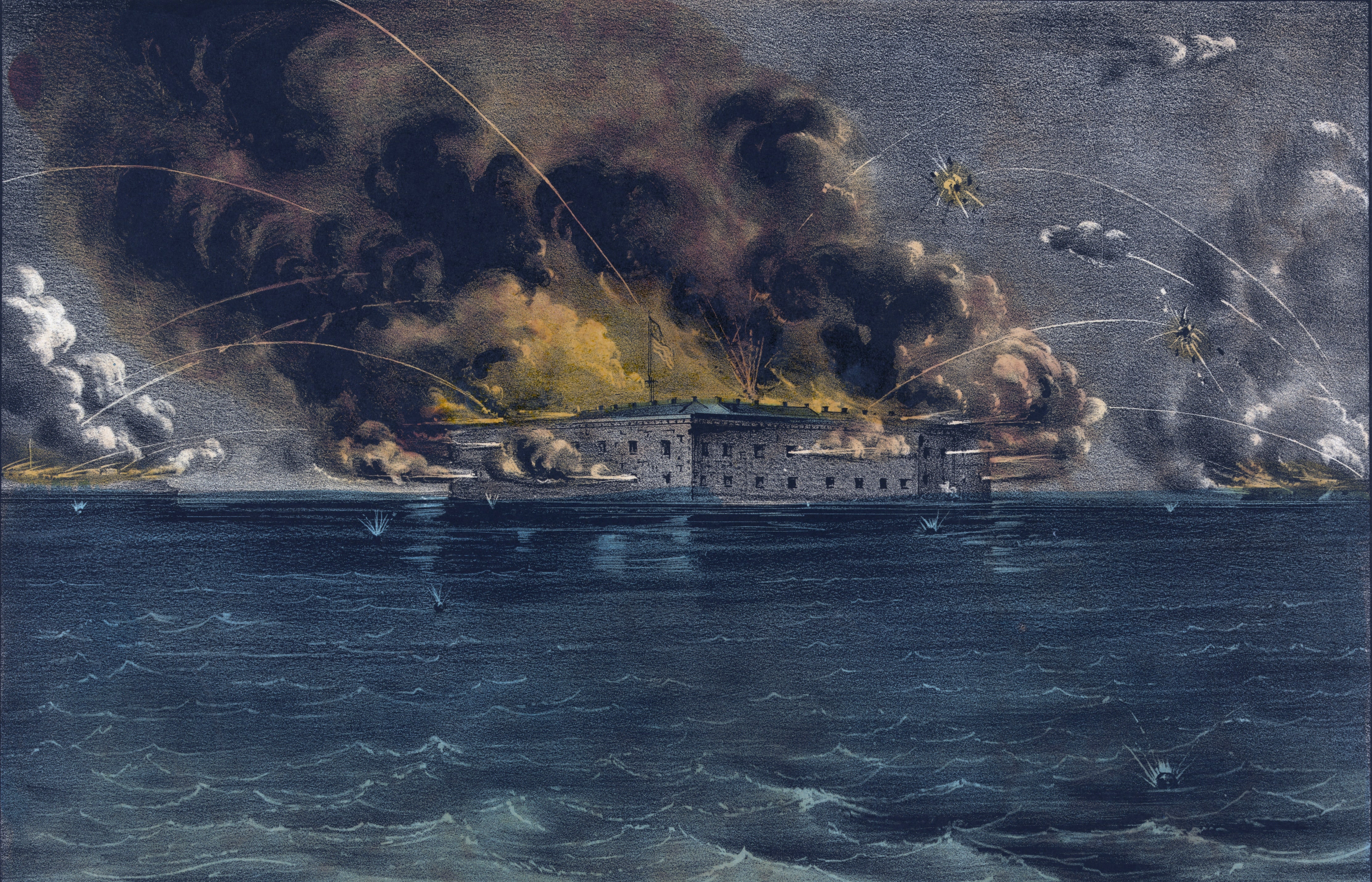
The attack on Fort Sumter on April 12, 1861, which ignited the American Civil War

Secession.

In early 1861, the most urgent standoff between the Union and the Confederacy centered on Fort Sumter in Charleston Harbor. The small federal garrison there, commanded by Maj. Gen. Robert Anderson, was running dangerously low on food and thus could only hold out for about six weeks before surrender. The American flag over Fort Sumter had by then become a potent symbol of Union authority, and Lincoln hesitated to abandon it despite advice from senior leaders. Maj. Gen. Winfield Scott, the army’s commander, believed reinforcing the fort was impossible, and Secretary of State William Seward favored withdrawal. Only one cabinet member supported holding firm.

Lincoln, wary of appearing weak, looked for alternatives. He authorized troop landings at Fort Pickens in Florida, though the orders were not executed. Gustavus V. Fox, a former naval officer and Blair’s brother-in-law, proposed resupplying Fort Sumter by sea. After surveying Charleston, Fox reported the plan feasible. On March 29, after intense debate, Lincoln won cabinet support for the resupply effort, with only Seward opposed. He ordered Fox to assemble a fleet by April 6.

The move forced the Confederacy’s hand: if fighting broke out, Southerners would fire first. Fox’s fleet sailed April 9, and Confederate President Jefferson Davis demanded Anderson’s surrender. When Anderson refused, Confederate guns opened fire on April 12, 1861. After thirty-six hours, Fort Sumter capitulated. The next day, Lincoln called for 75,000 troops, commencing the Civil War.

== Composition ==
Original lyrics (Note: The sources all agree on the lyrics themselves, but some differ on the punctuation. For instance, some place an exclamation point in the introductory verse of each stanza. For consistency's sake, the lyrics are copied verbatim from the original sheet music (Root, "The First Gun Is Fired").)

The first gun is fired.
May God protect the right,
Let the freeborn sons of the North arise
In power's avenging might;
Shall the glorious Union our fathers made,
By ruthless hands be sundered,
And we of freedom's sacred rights
By trait'rous foes be plundered?

CHORUS
Arise! Arise! Arise!
And gird ye for the fight,
And let our watchword ever be,
"May God protect the right."

The first gun is fired.
Its echoes thrill the land,
And the bounding hearts of the patriot throng,
Now firmly take their stand;
We will bow no more to the tyrant few
Who scorn our long forbearing,
But with Columbia's stars and stripes
We'll quench their trait'rous daring.

(CHORUS)

The first gun is fired.
Oh! heed the signal well,
And the thunder tone as it rolls along
Shall sound oppression's knell;
For the arm of freedom is mighty still,
Its strength shall fail us never,
That strength we'll give to our righteous cause
And our glorious land forever.

(CHORUS)

— George Frederick Root

=== Lyrical analysis ===
Root dedicated "The First Gun Is Fired" to "all who love Union and Freedom." In the early Civil War-era context, "freedom" does not necessarily signify emancipation. Rather, according to historian Gary W. Gallagher when commenting on "The Battle Cry of Freedom", Root promotes the notion that Americans can only be free if their nation is united. This harks back to Daniel Webster's famous equation of "Liberty and Union". "Freedom" may also denote freedom for all Americans regardless of class—the ability of working-class white people to thrive against a Southern slaveholding oligarchy.

The subtitle "May God Defend the Right," recurring in the chorus (with "protect" instead of "defend"), suits Root's background in Christian hymnody. In fact, many of his popular compositions bear religious overtones. Faith was a prevalent motif in Unionist music; Christian imagery imparted a sense of righteousness tied to their cause, evident in Julia Ward Howe's "Battle Hymn of the Republic" and Root's "God Bless Our Young Brave Volunteers".

Root's lyrics "[flow] with energy and conviction."

The final two lines of the chorus are intended to be sung in four-part harmony. According to Carder, the song strikingly resembles a tune in Joseph Haydn's oratorio The Creation, "The Heavens Are Telling".

=== General analysis ===
Root was an avid practitioner of what might be called occasional music. As he would profess, "I never dreamed of eminence as a writer of music [...] I am simply one who…makes music for the people, having always a particular need in view." He excelled at making accessible music that served a specific purpose, for the classroom, church, home, and in this case, a patriotic rally—his song serving to unify an alarmed public on the brink of civil war. "The First Gun Is Fired" captured a historic moment and filled a need in the first days of the war.

== Bibliography ==
=== Books ===
- Carder, P. H. (2008). George F. Root, Civil War Songwriter: A Biography. Jefferson, North Carolina: McFarland & Company, Inc. ISBN 978-0-7864-3374-2.
- Ewen, David (1962). Popular American Composers from Revolutionary Times to the Present: A Biographical and Critical Guide. New York City, New York: H. W. Wilson Company, Inc. ISBN 978-0824200404.
- Finson, Jon W. (1994). The Voices That Are Gone: Themes in Nineteenth-Century American Popular Song. New York City, New York: Oxford University Press. ISBN 0-19-505750-3.
- Gienapp, William E. (2002). Abraham Lincoln and Civil War America: A Biography. New York City, New York: Oxford University Press. ISBN 0-19-515100-3.
- Hattaway, Herman; Jones, Arthur (1991). How the North Won: A Military History of the Civil War (2 ed.). Chicago, Illinois: University of Illinois Press. ISBN 0-252-06210-8.
- Howard, John T. (1946). Our American Music: Three Hundred Years of It (3rd ed.). New York: Thomas Y. Crowell Company.
- Kelley, Bruce C.; Snell, Mark A. (2004). Bugle Resounding: Music and Musicians of the Civil War Era. Columbia, Missouri: University of Missouri Press. ISBN 0-8262-1538-6.
- McNeil, W. K. (2005). Encyclopedia of American Gospel Music. New York City, New York: Routledge. ISBN 978-0-415-94179-2.
- McWhirter, Christian (2012). Battle Hymns: The Power and Popularity of Music in the Civil War. Chapel Hill, North Carolina: University of North Carolina Press. ISBN 978-0-8078-3550-0.
- Root, George F. (1891). The Story of a Musical Life: An Autobiography by Geo F. Root. Cincinnati, Ohio: The John Church Co. ISBN 978-1-4047-8329-4.
- Sadie, Stanley, ed. (1995). The New Grove Dictionary of Music and Musicians. Vol. 16 (6 ed.). London, United Kingdom: Macmillan Publishers. ISBN 0-333-23111-2.
- Silber, Irwin (1995). Songs of the Civil War. Mineola, New York: Dover Publications. ISBN 0-486-28438-7.
- Spaeth, Sigmund (1948). A History of Popular Music in America. New York: Random House.

=== Studies and journals ===
- Birdseye, George (1879). "America's Song Composers: II. George F. Root". Potter's American Monthly. 12 (86): 145–148 – via Internet Archive.
- Epstein, Dena J. (1944). "Music Publishing in Chicago before 1871: The Firm of Root & Cady, 1858-1871". Notes. 1 (4): 43–59. doi:10.2307/891291. JSTOR 891291.

=== Websites ===
- Fuld, James J. (July 10, 2012). "Patriotic music". Grove Music Online.
- Gallagher, Gary W. (February 15, 2024). "In Patriotic Melodies in the Civil War North, 'Freedom' Wasn't Necessarily a Cry for African-American Emancipation". HistoryNet.
- "Fort Sumter". American Battlefield Trust.
- "George Frederick Root". Song of America.
- "The First Gun Is Fired! 'May God Protect the Right!' Rallying Song and Chorus". Jacob E. Arsenault & Company.

=== Other media ===
- Root, George F. (1861). The First Gun Is Fired. Chicago, Illinois: Root & Cady – via Baylor University Digital Collections.
- "Poetry: "The First Gun Is Fired. 'May God Protect the Right!'"". Western Reserve Chronicle. May 17, 1861. p. 1.
