= Divided & United =

Divided & United: The Songs of the Civil War

Studio album by various artists
- Released: November 5, 2013
- Genres: Country, Folk, Bluegrass
- Length: 2:08:34
- Label: ATO
- Producer: Randall Poster

Divided & United: The Songs of the Civil War is a compilation album of American Civil War music recorded by various artists. It was released on November 5, 2013 through ATO Records. The album was produced with the help of music supervisor Randall Poster, whose credits include work with Boardwalk Empire and Moonrise Kingdom. The album features contributions from many notable country and bluegrass musicians, including Loretta Lynn, Old Crow Medicine Show, Dolly Parton, T Bone Burnett, Del McCoury, and Karen Elson, among others.

== Track listing ==
Disc one
No.	Title	Artist(s)	Length
1.	"Take Your Gun and Go, John"	Loretta Lynn	3:30
2.	"Lorena"	Del McCoury	4:07
3.	"Wildwood Flower"	Sam Amidon	2:46
4.	"Hell's Broke Loose In Georgia"	Bryan Sutton	3:26
5.	"Two Soldiers"	Ricky Skaggs	4:29
6.	"Marching Through Georgia"	Old Crow Medicine Show	4:07
7.	"Dear Old Flag"	Vince Gill	3:57
8.	"Just Before the Battle, Mother"/"Farewell, Mother"	Steve Earle and Dirk Powell	4:55
9.	"The Fall of Charleston"	Shovels & Rope	3:10
10.	"Tenting on the Old Campground"	John Doe	5:27
11.	"Day of Liberty"	Carolina Chocolate Drops	4:31
12.	"Richmond Is a Hard Road to Travel"	Chris Thile and Michael Daves	4:24
13.	"Two Brothers"	Chris Stapleton	2:56
14.	"The Faded Coat of Blue"	Norman Blake, Nancy Blake, and James Bryan	3:19
15.	"Listen to the Mockingbird"	Stuart Duncan featuring Dolly Parton	4:05
16.	"Kingdom Come"	Pokey LaFarge	2:52

Disc two
No.	Title	Artist(s)	Length
1.	"Rebel Soldier"	Jamey Johnson	4:53
2.	"The Legend of the Rebel Soldier"	Lee Ann Womack	4:58
3.	"The Mermaid Song"	Jorma Kaukonen	3:50
4.	"Dixie"	Karen Elson with The Secret Sisters	4:39
5.	"The Vacant Chair"	Ralph Stanley	3:52
6.	"Hard Times Come Again No More"	Chris Hillman	3:50
7.	"Down By the Riverside"	Taj Mahal	3:33
8.	"Old Folks at Home"/"The Girl I left Behind Me"	Noam Pikelny and David Grisman	5:07
9.	"Secash"	The Tennessee Mafia Jug Band	3:26
10.	"The Battle of Antietam"	T Bone Burnett	6:28
11.	"Pretty Saro"	Ashley Monroe featuring Aubrey Haynie	2:55
12.	"Aura Lee"	Joe Henry	3:37
13.	"Johnny Has Gone for a Soldier"	AA Bondy	4:03
14.	"When Johnny Comes Marching Home"	Angel Snow	3:15
15.	"Battle Cry of Freedom"	Bryan Sutton	4:27
16.	"Beautiful Dreamer"	Cowboy Jack Clement	3:24

== Chart performance ==
Chart (2013)	Peak position
US Billboard 200	190
US Billboard Top Country Albums	32
US Billboard Top Folk Albums	11
US Billboard Independent Albums	25
