= Boomer's Story =

Studio album by Ry Cooder
- Released: November 1972
- Studios: Amigo Studios (North Hollywood); Ardent Studios (Memphis); Muscle Shoals Sound Studios (Muscle Shoals); Quadrafonic Sound Studios (Nashville)
- Genres: Roots rock; blues; folk; Americana
- Length: 39:05
- Label: Reprise
- Producers: Jim Dickinson; Lenny Waronker

Ry Cooder chronology
Into the Purple Valley (1972)	Boomer's Story (1972)	Paradise and Lunch (1974)

Professional ratings
Review scores
Source	Rating
Allmusic	link
Christgau's Record Guide	B

Boomer's Story is the third studio album by American roots rock musician Ry Cooder, released in November 1972.

== Background ==
"The Dark End of the Street", co-written by Dan Penn and Chips Moman, is originally known as a recording by James Carr, but in this album it is presented as a guitar-driven instrumental. The album also features "Ax Sweet Mama" and "President Kennedy", both written by Sleepy John Estes, with Estes himself performing lead vocals on the latter. Estes's parts were recorded in Collierville, Tennessee.

The piano on "Rally 'Round the Flag" is played by Randy Newman.

== Track listing ==
Side one
No.	Title	Writer(s)	Length
1.	"Boomer's Story"	listed as "Traditional," actually Carson Robison	4:15
2.	"Cherry Ball Blues" (Instrumental)	Skip James	4:13
3.	"Crow Black Chicken"	Lawrence Wilson	2:20
4.	"Ax Sweet Mama"	Sleepy John Estes	4:27
5.	"Maria Elena" (Instrumental)	Bob Russell; Lorenzo Barcelata	4:32
Total length:			19:47

Side two
No.	Title	Writer(s)	Length
6.	"The Dark End of the Street" (Instrumental)	Dan Penn; Chips Moman	3:27
7.	"Rally 'Round the Flag"	George F. Root	3:39
8.	"Comin' In on a Wing and a Prayer"	Jimmy McHugh; Harold Adamson	3:03
9.	"President Kennedy"	Sleepy John Estes	4:38
10.	"Good Morning Mr. Railroad Man"	Traditional	4:31
Total length:			19:18 39:05

== Notes ==
The title track was previously recorded as "The Railroad Boomer" by Bud Billings (aka Frank Luther) and Carson Robison in a performance recorded at the studio at Liederkranz Hall in New York on September 9, 1929 (Victor V-40139). Although it is credited on Cooder's album as "traditional," Robison was awarded a copyright and the song "can't be shown to have circulated in oral tradition." Gene Autry recorded it in December of the same year. In the 1930s the song was recorded for Decca Records by the Rice Brothers' Gang, in 1939 by Roy Acuff & His Smoky Mountain Boys, in 1941 by Riley Puckett for RCA, and in the 1950s by Cisco Houston (as "The Rambler") and by the New Lost City Ramblers, who included Cooder's guitar teacher Tom Paley.

== Personnel ==
- Ry Cooder - guitars, mandolin, bottleneck guitar, vocals
- Tommy McClure - bass
- Charles Lawing - clarinet
- Jim Keltner, Roger Hawkins - drums
- Sleepy John Estes - guitar and vocals on "President Kennedy" (recorded in Collierville, Tennessee)
- Gene Finney - harmonica
- George Bohanon - horns
- Milt Holland - percussion
- Randy Newman - piano on "Rally 'Round the Flag"
- Jim Dickinson - piano, bass, backing vocals
- Dan Penn - backing vocals

Technical

- Judy Maizel - production assistant
- Jerry Masters, John Fry, Lee Herschberg, Richard Rosebrough - engineer
- Susan Titelman - photography
