= Rally 'Round the Flag (disambiguation) =

"Rally 'Round the Flag", a song from 1862

Rally 'Round the Flag may also refer to:

- Rally 'round the flag effect, an increase in support of government leaders during times of international crisis
- Rally Round the Flag, Boys!, a 1958 film
