= Good Bye, Old Glory =

"Good Bye, Old Glory" is a song published on September 29, 1865, after the end of the American Civil War. The words are by L. J. Bates with music by George Frederick Root.

Its subject is the end of the war and the end of army life from a soldier's point of view. Old Glory is the Union flag. The "tattoo" in the song refers to a military drum call. Hard tack, the battle of Vicksburg and a warning to Britain are referenced in the song.

== Lyrics ==
Verse 1
Four weary years of toil and blood,
With loyal hearts and true,
By field and fortress plain and flood,
We've fought the rebel crew,
But Victory is ours at last,
The mighty work is through,
Sound drums and bugles loud and fast,
This is our last tattoo .

Chorus
Farewell farewell to march and fight,
Hard tack a fond adieu.
Good bye "Old Glory" for tonight,
We doff the army blue.

Verse 2
O comrades that may ne'er return,
Who sleep beneath the dew,
Where Vickburg's gleaming signal's burn or
Lookout's crest of blue.
Where-e'er your blood has sealed the faith,
We brought in triumph through,
Goodnight to glory and to death,
And that's good morn to you.

Chorus

Verse 3
Farewell to pens and prison holes,
Where fiends themselves broke through,
And tortured noble captive souls
That they could not subdue,
But in the fullness of the day
Heaven's justice did we do.
Disaster, famine, ruin, may
Make fearful answer true.

Chorus

Verse 4
Goodbye to muster and parade,
Goodbye the grand review,
The dusty line, the dashing aid,
Goodbye our general too.
Goodbye to war, but halt! I say,
John Bull a word with you,
Pay up old scores or we again
May don the army blue.

Chorus
