= Mollie Arline Kirkland Bailey =

American businesswoman, circus performer, and spy

Mollie Arline Kirkland Bailey (c. 1841—October 2, 1918), also known as "Aunt Mollie" and the "Circus Queen of the Southwest," was an American businesswoman, circus performer, and spy.

== Biography ==
=== Early life ===
Mollie Arline Kirkland was born on a plantation, either in or near Mobile, Alabama, the daughter of William and Mary Arline Kirkland. Sources report her birth year as being as early as the mid-1830s to as late as 1844; the generally agreed upon year is 1841, which is the date used by her family and the Texas State Historical Commission and is featured on her headstone. As a child, Kirkland Bailey expressed a talent for performing, putting on plays with her siblings, and, being something of a tomboy, her parents enrolled her in a ladies' academy near Tuscaloosa, Alabama.

=== Career ===
As a teenager, she met James Augustus "Gus" Bailey, a cornet player who came from a circus family; the Kirklands did not approve of their daughter's proposed union and so, in March 1858, the two eloped. For their elopement and that the two stole a wagon and several horses from the family, Kirkland Bailey's parents disinherited her. The couple, along with Kirkland Bailey's sister, Fanny, and brother-in-law, Alfred, began performing in Alabama, Arkansas, and Mississippi as the Bailey Family Troupe, until the American Civil War broke out. As a Southerner, Kirkland Bailey's husband enlisted in the Confederate States Army, initially assigned to the Forty-fourth Infantry Regiment in Selma, Alabama and later transferred to Hood's Texas Brigade to serve as a bandmaster. To do her part in serving the Confederacy, Kirkland Bailey nursed Confederate soldiers and reportedly served as a spy, disguised as an elderly woman selling cookies, for John Bell Hood and Jubal Anderson Early, leaving her daughter Dixie with friends in Virginia in order to do so. She returned to performing, alongside Gus and Alfred, as part of Hood's Minstrels, in 1864.

Towards the end of the American Civil War, the Baileys enjoyed a good deal of fame with the popularity of Gus's song, The Old Gray Mare, a marching song he'd written during his time in the army. So popular was the tune that it became the official marching song of the Texas Brigade and later, in 1928, used as a theme song for the Democratic convention. After the war, they started touring on showboats as the Bailey Concert Company and did so until 1879, after which they officially began touring as a circus. Gus fell ill early on in their career as circus performers and so, Kirkland Bailey oversaw the show's operations and it was called the Mollie A. Bailey Show. Per her wishes, veterans, both of the Confederacy and the Union, and indigent children were granted free admission to shows. Though it began as a one-ring circus, the show drew immense interest and, at its peak, included 31 wagons and more than 200 animals, and her children and second husband, a gas lighting manager Blackie Bailey, performed alongside her. The circus, intended for families, was free of con games or other cheating and predominantly toured small towns. James Stephen Hogg even presented her with a wild boar's tooth mounted in gold, upon which her name was inscribed, as a gift to her.

Kirkland Bailey retired from the circus in 1917, after the death of her daughter, Birda, but continued to manage the circus's operation by telegraphy.

=== Personal life ===
She married twice, firstly to James Augustus "Gus" Bailey (1834—1900) and secondly to A. H. Hardesty (also known as Blackie Bailey; d. 1937). She reportedly had nine children with Bailey and none with Hardesty. Her known children included sons James Eugene Bailey ("Eugene"), Brad Bailey, A. K. Bailey, and Willie Bailey and daughters Dixie Bailey, Minnie Bailey Mansfield, and Birda Bailey Dickens ("Birdie").

Kirkland Bailey made numerous attempts to reconcile with her father, William, but he always rebuffed her.

=== Death and legacy ===
Kirkland Bailey died at St. Joseph's Infirmary, now St. Joseph Medical Center, in Houston, Texas and was buried in the Fountain Hill area of Hollywood Cemetery, in Houston, Texas. The Texas Historical Commission later erected a commemorative plaque in her honor. Within two years of her death, without her guidance, the circus closed. Today, by her children with Bailey, she has living descendants in the United States.
