= The Flag of Secession =

The Flag of Secession is a song written in 1862 celebrating the secession of the southern states from the Union. The song is sung to the tune of "The Star-Spangled Banner", the national anthem of the United States. The author of the song is unknown. It was included in Frank Moore's (ed.) Rebellion Record (New York: G.P. Putnam, 1864), vol. 3, "Poetry and Incidents," p. 38.

== See also ==
- The Bonnie Blue Flag
- God Save the South
- Dixie (song)
