= Hood's Minstrels =

Hood's Minstrels were an amateur Texas-based blackface Confederate military band, of the Texas Brigade, during the American Civil War, who began performing in a log cabin theater that they built themselves in 1862; they performed in it alongside a choir and a brass band. They were the most popular group of their kind during the War. Members included Mollie and Gus Bailey.
