= Our First President's Quickstep =

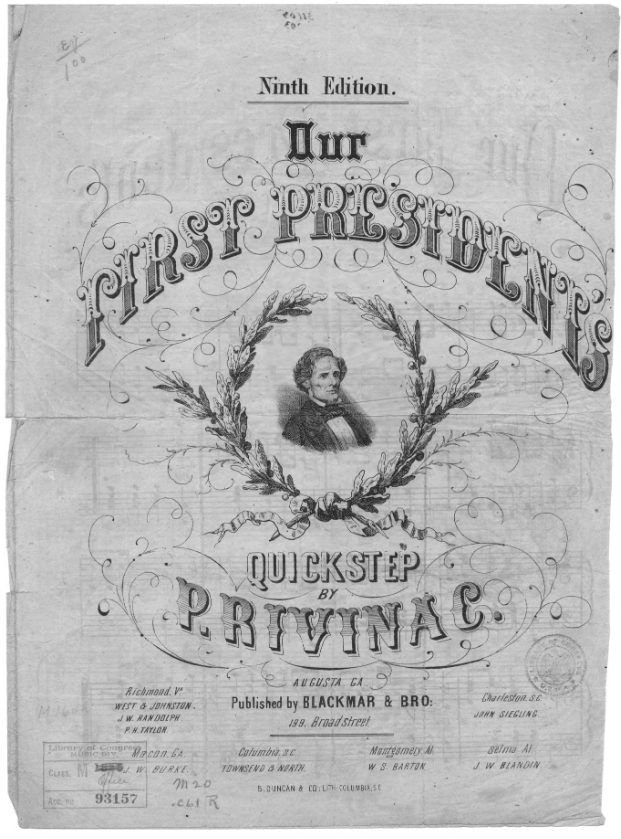
"Our First President's Quickstep" cover sheet

"Our First President's Quickstep" is a quickstep march written by P. Rivinac for piano and published by Blackmar & Bros, Augusta, Georgia. The march celebrates President of the Confederacy Jefferson Davis and was published the year he became president, 1861.

== About the author ==
P. Rivinac (1829 – 1915) composed several other works for piano : the "Atlantic Cable" waltz, "Rivinac's Medley Quickstep" (1864), " Pearl River Polka", "Gen. Bragg's Grand March", "Laughing Waltz", "Rosemary Grand Waltz", "La Rosianna" waltz.
