= Oratorio Society of Chicago =

The Oratorio Society of Chicago was an oratorio performance group, based out of Chicago, Illinois. It was founded in 1866, and destroyed by a fire in 1871. The Handel and Haydn Society of Boston then sent money for the Oratorio Society to be rebuilt, and it reformed as the Apollo Club, one of the music prestigious musical clubs in the country. It was led by Hans Balatka.
