= Normal Musical Institute =

The Normal Musical Institute (also the New York Normal Institute) was a school for the training of music teachers, the first such in the United States. It was organized by George F. Root, William Bradbury and Lowell Mason in New York in 1853. The institute was a four-week-long training session, taking place during the summer and costing ten dollars, in addition to room and board. Subjects included harmony, singing and composition.
