= Just Before the Battle, Mother =

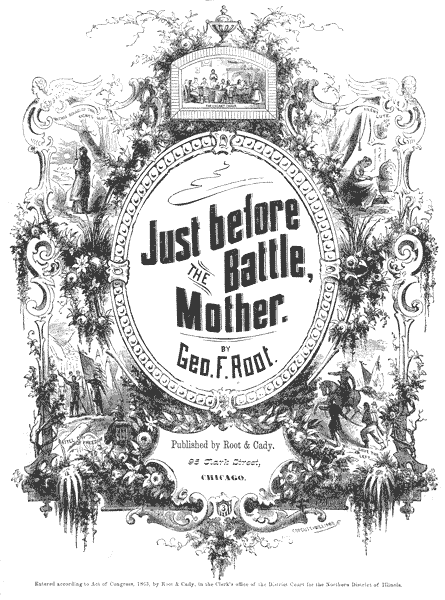
Cover of the 1864 sheet music for "Just Before the Battle, Mother"

"Just before the Battle, Mother" was a popular song during the American Civil War, particularly among troops in the Union Army. It was written and published by Chicago-based George F. Root. It was also a popular song with adherents of the Primrose League in England, and was a central part of Victoria Day celebrations in Canada during the late 19th and early-to-mid 20th centuries.

== Lyrics ==
Just before the battle, mother,
I am thinking most of you,
While upon the field we're watching
With the enemy in view.
Comrades brave are 'round me lying,
Filled with thoughts of home and God
For well they know that on the morrow,
Some will sleep beneath the sod.

CHORUS:
Farewell, mother, you may never
Press me to your heart again,
But, oh, you'll not forget me, mother,
If I'm numbered with the slain.

Oh, I long to see you, mother,
And the loving ones at home,
But I'll never leave our banner,
Till in honor I can come.
Tell the traitors all around you
That their cruel words we know,
In every battle kill our soldiers
By the help they give the foe.

CHORUS:
Farewell, mother, you may never
Press me to your heart again,
But, oh, you'll not forget me, mother,
If I'm numbered with the slain.

Hark! I hear the bugles sounding,
'Tis the signal for the fight,
Now, may God protect us, mother,
As He ever does the right.
Hear the "Battle-Cry of Freedom,"
How it swells upon the air,
Oh, yes, we'll rally 'round the standard,
Or we'll perish nobly there.

CHORUS:
Farewell, mother, you may never
Press me to your heart again,
But, oh, you'll not forget me, mother,
If I'm numbered with the slain.

Lyrics are in the public domain.

== Alternative versions ==
During the American Civil War, Union troops parodied the song due to its unrealistic depiction of the horrors of war. The first verse of the Song of the Coward, as it was known, can be dated to 1864 after several calamitous defeats at the hands of the Confederate army. Years after the Civil War, other verses were added by historical re-enactors.

Just before the battle mother
I was drinking mountain dew
When I heard the sound of gunfire
To the rear I quickly flew
Where the stragglers were all gathered
Thinking of their home and wives
Twas not the Rebs we feared dear mother
But our own dear precious lives

CHORUS:
Farewell, mother, you may never
Count my name among the slain
For if I only could skedaddle
Dear mother I'll come home again
