= George Frederick Root =

American songwriter and composer (1820–1895)

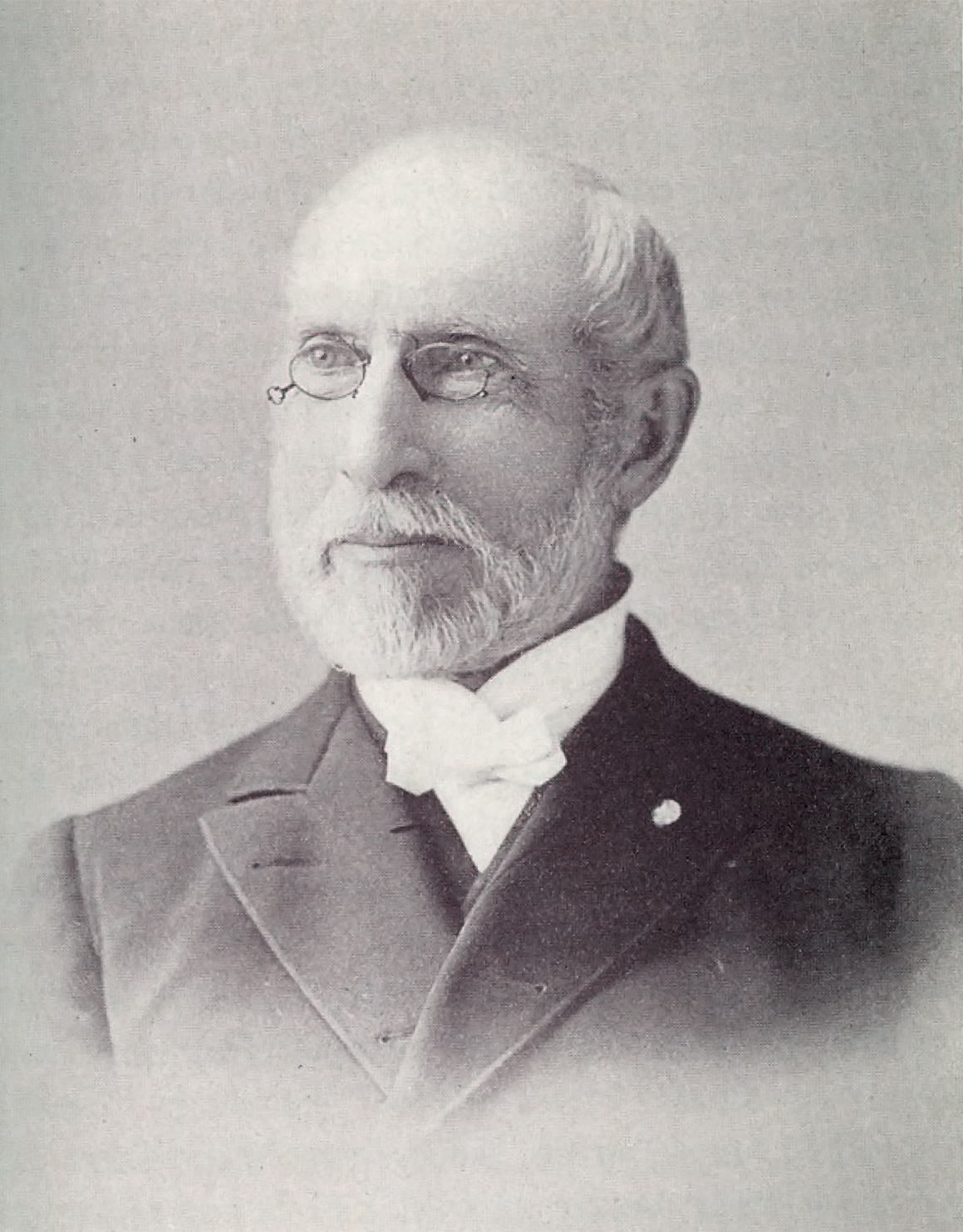
- Born: August 30, 1820; Sheffield, Massachusetts, U.S.
- Died: August 6, 1895 (aged 74); Bailey Island, Maine, U.S.
- Occupation: Composer
- Known for: Wartime songs

George Frederick Root (August 30, 1820 – August 6, 1895) was a romantic American composer, who found particular fame during the American Civil War, with songs such as "Tramp! Tramp! Tramp!", the tune re-used for "Jesus Loves the Little Children", and "The Battle Cry of Freedom". He is regarded as the first American to compose a secular cantata.

== Early life and education ==
Root was born at Sheffield, Massachusetts, and was named after the German composer George Frideric Handel. Root left his farming community for Boston at 18, flute in hand, intending to join an orchestra. He worked for a while as a church organist in Boston, and from 1845 taught music at the New York Institute for the Blind, where he met Fanny Crosby, with whom he would compose fifty to sixty popular secular songs. At least two of his children, Frederic Woodman Root and Grace W. Root, also became composers.

In 1850, he made a study tour of Europe, staying in Vienna, Paris, and London. He returned to teach music in Boston, Massachusetts as an associate of Lowell Mason, and later Bangor, Maine, where he was director of the Penobscot Musical Association and presided over their convention at Norumbega Hall in 1856.

From 1853 to 1855, Root helped Lowell Mason and William Bradbury establish the New York Normal Musical Institute, which served as a school for aspiring music educators. From 1855 on, Root would spend most of his summers traveling and teaching at music education conventions throughout New England. He applied a version of Pestalozzi's teaching and was instrumental in developing mid- and late-19th century American musical education. He was a follower of the teachings of Emanuel Swedenborg.

== Career ==
On his return from Europe, Root began composing and publishing sentimental popular songs, a number of which achieved fame as sheet-music, including those with Fanny Crosby: The Hazel Dell, Rosalie the Prairie Flower, There's Music in the Air and others, which were, according to Root's New York Times obituary, known throughout the country in the antebellum period. Root chose to employ the pseudonym Wurzel (German for Root) to capitalize on the popularity of German composers like Beethoven, Mendelssohn, Brahms, Weber and Schumann during the 1850s, and to keep his identity as a serious composer against his composition of minstrel and popular songs.

Besides his popular songs, he also composed gospel songs in the Ira Sankey vein, and collected and edited volumes of choral music for singing schools, Sunday schools, church choirs and musical institutes. Root assisted William Bradbury in compiling The Shawm in 1853, a collection of hymn tunes and choral anthems, featuring the cantata Daniel: or the Captivity and Restoration. The cantata was a collaboration between Root and Bradbury musically, with text by Fanny Crosby and C. M. Cady. In 1860 he compiled The Diapason: Collection of Church Music.

He also composed various sacred and secular cantatas including the popular The Haymakers (1857). Root's cantatas were popular on both sides of the Atlantic throughout the 19th century. His first cantata, The Flower Queen: or The Coronation of the Rose, was composed in 1851 with libretto by Fanny Crosby, and gained immediate success in singing schools across the United States.The Flower Queen has been regarded as the first secular cantata written by an American.

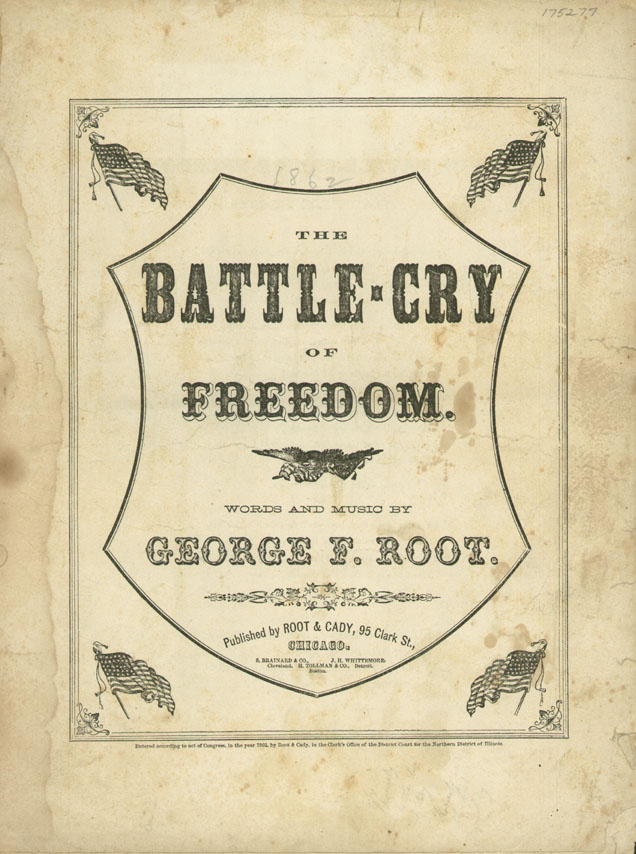
Cover to "The Battle-Cry of Freedom" by George F. Root

Building on his talent for song-writing, Root moved to Chicago, Illinois in 1859 to work for his brother's music publishing house of Root & Cady. He became particularly successful during the American Civil War, as the composer of martial songs such as "Tramp! Tramp! Tramp!" (The Prisoner's Hope), "The Vacant Chair" (with lyrics by Henry S. Washburn), "Just before the Battle, Mother", and "The Battle Cry of Freedom". He wrote the first song concerning the war, "The First Gun is Fired", only two days after the conflict began with the bombardment of Fort Sumter. He ultimately had at least 35 war-time "hits", in tone from the bellicose to the ethereal. His songs were played and sung at both the home front and the real front. Tramp, Tramp, Tramp became popular on troop marches, and "Battle Cry of Freedom" became well-known even in England.

After the war, he was elected as a 3rd Class (honorary) Companion of the Military Order of the Loyal Legion of the United States. Root's songs, particularly "The Battle Cry of Freedom", were popular among Union soldiers during the war. According to Henry Stone, a Union war veteran recalling in the late 1880s:

A glee club came down from Chicago, bringing with them the new song, 'We'll rally 'round the flag, boys', and it ran through the camp like wildfire. The effect was little short of miraculous. It put as much spirit and cheer into the army as a victory. Day and night one could hear it by every camp fire and in every tent. I never shall forget how the men rolled out the line, 'And although he may be poor, he shall never be a slave.' I do not know whether Mr. Root knows what good work his song did for us there, but I hope so.

— Henry Stone, 1887

== Later life and death ==
Root was awarded the degree of Musical Doctor by the first University of Chicago in 1872. He died at his summer home in Bailey Island, Maine, at the age of 74. He was buried at the Harmonyvale Cemetery in North Reading, Massachusetts.

== Legacy ==
Root was inducted into the Songwriters Hall of Fame in 1970.

Tramp, Tramp, Tramp, the Boys are Marching provided the tune for the later Jesus Loves the Little Children, with lyrics by C. Herbert Woolston, and also for the later God Save Ireland. The Vacant Chair provided a tune reused in Life's Railway to Heaven, and sometimes reused in To Jesus' Heart All Burning.

== See also ==
- Music of the American Civil War
- Parlor songs

== Bibliography ==
- George F. Root: The story of a musical life; an autobiography
- Polly Carder: George F. Root, Civil War songwriter : a biography
- Polly Hinson Carder: George Frederick Root, pioneer music educator his contributions to mass instruction in music
- Cheryl Ann Jackson: George Frederick Root and his Civil War songs
