= Tramp! Tramp! Tramp! =

1864 song by George F. Root

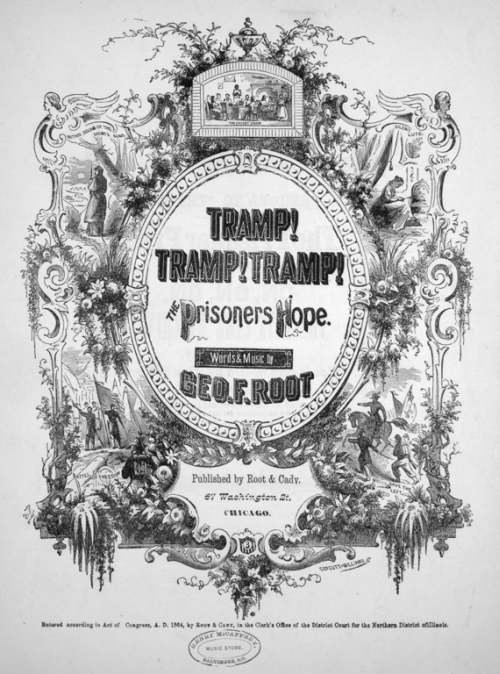
- Sheet music cover, 1864

Song
- Written: 1864
- Published: 1864
- Genre: War song
- Songwriter: George F. Root

"Tramp! Tramp! Tramp! (The Prisoner's Hope)" was one of the most popular songs of the American Civil War. George F. Root wrote both the words and music and published it in 1864 to give hope to the Union prisoners of war. The song is written from the prisoner's point of view. The chorus tells his fellow prisoners that hope is coming. A Confederate version and various other versions have been made.

== Lyrics ==
In the prison cell I sit, thinking Mother, dear, of you,
And our bright and happy home so far away,
And the tears they fill my eyes 'spite of all that I can do,
Tho' I try to cheer my comrades and be gay.

(Chorus)

Tramp! Tramp! Tramp! The boys are marching,
Cheer up comrades they will come,
And beneath the starry flag we shall breathe the air again,
Of the free land in our own beloved home.

In the battle front we stood, when their fiercest charge they made,
And they swept us off a hundred men or more,
But before we reached their lines, they were beaten back dismayed,
And we heard the cry of vict'ry o'er and o'er.

(Chorus)

So within the prison cell we are waiting for the day
That shall come to open wide the iron door.
And the hollow eye grows bright, and the poor heart almost gay,
As we think of seeing home and friends once more.

(Chorus)

== Confederate lyrics ==
In addition to the original version, soldiers of the Confederate States of America made their own lyrics to the tune. The Confederate lyrics revolve around General Lee's Army of Northern Virginia invading Pennsylvania, following which prisoners held in Northern prison camps shall be liberated.

In my prison cell I sit,
thinking, Mother, dear, of you,
and my happy Southern home so far away;
and my eyes they fill with tears
'spite of all that I can do,
though I try to cheer my comrades and be gay.

(Chorus)

Tramp! Tramp! Tramp!
The boys are marching;
cheer up, comrades, they will come.
And beneath the stars and bars
we shall breathe the air again
of free men in our own beloved home.

In the battle front we stood
when their fiercest charge they made,
and our soldiers by the thousands sank to die;
but before they reached our lines,
they were driven back dismayed,
and the "Rebel yell" went upward to the sky.

(Chorus)

Now our great commander Lee
crosses broad Potomac's stream,
and his legions marching Northward take their way.
On Pennsylvania's roads
will their trusty muskets gleam,
and her iron hills shall echo to the fray.

(Chorus)

In the cruel stockade-pen
dying slowly day by day,
for weary months we've waited all in vain;
but if God will speed the way
of our gallant boys in gray,
I shall see your face, dear Mother, yet again.

(Chorus)

When I close my eyes in sleep,
all the dear ones 'round me come,
at night my little sister to me calls;
and mocking visions bring
all the warm delights of home,
while we freeze and starve in Northern prison walls.

(Chorus)

So the weary days go by,
and we wonder as we sigh,
if with sight of home we'll never more be blessed.
Our hearts within us sink,
and we murmur, though we try
to leave it all with him who knowest best.

(Chorus)

== Versions ==
The song has been parodied and the melody has been repurposed numerous times:

Ohio Abolitionist Joshua McCarter Simpson rewrote the lyrics.

Religion

- It is well known as the melody for the Christian children's song "Jesus Loves the Little Children".
- The Latter-day Saint hymn "In Our Lovely Deseret" employs the tune as well.

Politics

- An early variant was "Damn, Damn, Damn the Philippinos", sung by U.S. Marines during the Philippine–American War.
- In 1913, the labor organizer and songwriter Joe Hill (1879–1915) wrote a song for the Industrial Workers of the World to the tune, called "The Tramp", about a man who is trying to find a job, only to get the universal answer: 'Tramp, tramp, tramp, keep on a-tramping / Nothing doing here for you / If I catch you 'round again / You will wear the ball and chain / Keep on tramping, that's the best thing you can do.'
- In 1914 the melody and meter were used as the basis for the World War I song, Belgium Put the Kibosh on the Kaiser by Mark Sheridan.
- In 1950, the German anti-US propaganda song "Ami – go home!" by Ernst Busch was set to this tune (arranged by Hanns Eisler).
- The KPD/ML used this tune in a song named "Deutschland-Lied" advocating for a unified Germany.
- The ACP used an electronic remix of the tune in "Announcing the American Communist Party".

Sports

- The melody of this song is used as the second stanza of the Georgetown University Fight Song, collectively known as "There Goes Old Georgetown."
- Club Deportivo Universidad Católica, one of Chile's most important football clubs, has used the music of this song as the official fight song of the "Cruzados Caballeros" since 1943. Also, it has been part of the corporate identity of Channel 13, which served as the startup music of the channel for much of the 1980s, the version used was that of Carlos Haiquel on vocals with mixed chorus, with the orchestral arrangement by Tito Ledermann. The current version was recorded in 1970.
- The melody of this song, as used in "God Save Ireland", makes up part of "Put 'Em Under Pressure," the official song written to support Ireland's national football team in the 1990 FIFA World Cup.
- The melody of this song, out of "God Save Ireland" was used as the tune for a novelty record fan-anthem, for the 1978 world cup released as the song Ally's Tartan Army.

Other

- It was the melody of "Tokoshie no Sachi"(永遠の幸, Eternal Happiness), the alma mater of Sapporo Agricultural College (now Hokkaido University) in Japan.
- In the 1933 Laurel and Hardy comedy film Sons of the Desert, the anthem of the Sons of the Desert lounge is a pastiche of several popular tunes, including Tramp! Tramp! Tramp! as well as Give My Regards to Broadway.
- Bing Crosby included the song in a medley on his album 101 Gang Songs (1961)
- The German band De Höhner use the tune for their song "Dat Hätz vun d'r Welt" (published in 1982), sung in praise of Cologne in the local dialect, Kölsch.
- In the November 26, 2010, edition of the Pickles comic strip, lead character Earl Pickles sings the chorus as a preemptive strike against his wife's urge to sing holiday songs.

== Bibliography ==
- Root, George R. "Tramp! Tramp! Tramp!" (Sheet music). Chicago: Root & Cady (1864).
- Smith, Nicholas, Col. Stories of Great National Songs. Milwaukee, Wis.: The Yound Churchman Co. (1899).
