= Battle Cry of Freedom =

1862 song by George Frederick Root

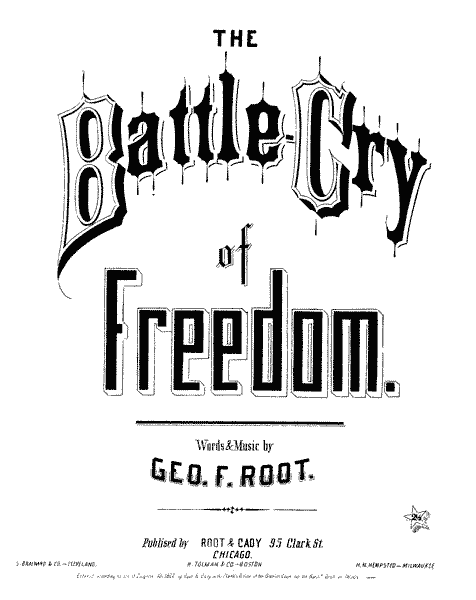
- Cover of the 1862 sheet music for "Battle Cry of Freedom"

Song
- Published: 1862
- Songwriter: George Frederick Root

The "Battle Cry of Freedom", also known as "Rally 'Round the Flag", is a song written in 1862 by American composer George Frederick Root (1820–1895) during the American Civil War. A patriotic song advocating the causes of Unionism and abolitionism, it became so popular that composer H. L. Schreiner and lyricist W. H. Barnes adapted it for the Confederacy.

A modified Union version was used as the campaign song for the Lincoln-Johnson ticket in the 1864 presidential election, as well as in elections after the war, such as for Garfield in the 1880 U.S. presidential election. It is estimated that over 700,000 copies of its sheet music were put in circulation. The song was so popular that the music publisher had 14 printing presses going at one time and still could not keep up with demand. Louis Moreau Gottschalk thought so highly of the song that in his diary he confided that he thought "it should be our national anthem" and used it as the basis for his 1863 concert paraphrase for solo piano "Le Cri de délivrance," opus 55, and dedicated it to Root, who was a personal friend. Charles Ives quoted the song in several compositions, including his own patriotic song, "They Are There".

== History ==
"Battle Cry of Freedom" proved popular among Union soldiers during the American Civil War. According to Henry Stone, a Union war veteran recalling in the late 1880s, the song helped the morale of Union soldiers:

A glee club came down from Chicago, bringing with them the new song, "We'll rally 'round the flag, boys", and it ran through the camp like wildfire. The effect was little short of miraculous. It put as much spirit and cheer into the army as a victory. Day and night one could hear it by every camp fire and in every tent. I never shall forget how the men rolled out the line, "And although he may be poor, he shall never be a slave." I do not know whether Mr. Root knows what good work his song did for us there, but I hope so.

— Henry Stone, The Century Illustrated, "Memoranda on the Civil War: A Song in Camp" (1887), emphasis added

According to historian Christian L. McWhirter, the song's success and popularity among the Union was due to its even-handed references to both abolitionism and unionism. Thus, both groups of Unionists, those opposed to slavery and secession, could utilize the song without reservation:

The ability of "The Battle Cry of Freedom" to bridge divisions over emancipation is not surprising. The song's definition of the Northern cause is purposely open-ended. Those looking for anti-slavery sentiments could find them, but these elements were not so pronounced as to offend those who were solely unionists. The chorus was the key, for it was there that Root described why Northerners rallied around the flag. The first line boldly endorsed a perpetual Union – "The Union forever" – followed by a strong dismissal of secession: "Down with the traitor, up with the star." However, the battle cry Root shouted was one of "freedom." Freedom had many meanings in the Civil War – for instance, freedom from Confederate political tyranny or the oft-perceived "slaveholders' conspiracy" – but, in the context of Root’s political beliefs and other activities, he clearly meant to suggest some degree of abolitionism.

— Christian L. McWhirter, The New York Times, "Birth of the 'Battle Cry'" (July 27, 2012)

== Lyrics (Union version) ==
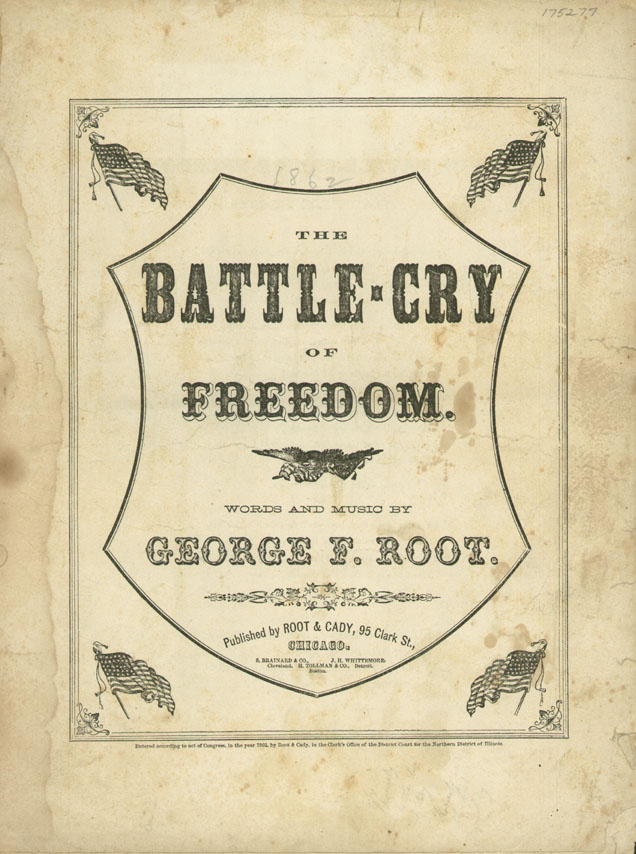
"The Battle Cry of Freedom"

Oh we'll rally round the flag, boys, we'll rally once again,
Shouting the battle cry of freedom
And we'll rally from the hillside, we'll gather from the plain,
Shouting the battle cry of freedom.

(Chorus)

The Union forever, hurrah! boys, hurrah!
Down with the traitors, up with the stars;
While we rally round the flag, boys, we rally once again,
Shouting the battle cry of freedom!

Oh we're springing to the call for three hundred thousand more, (Note: This line is sometimes given as: "We are springing to the call of our brothers gone before.")
Shouting the battle cry of freedom!
And we'll fill the vacant ranks with a million freemen more, (Note: This line is sometimes given as: "And we'll fill the vacant ranks of our brothers gone before.")
Shouting the battle cry of freedom.

(Chorus)

We will welcome to our numbers the loyal, true and brave,
Shouting the battle cry of freedom!
And although he may be poor, he shall never be a slave, (Note: This line is sometimes given as: "And although they may be poor, not a man shall be a slave.")
Shouting the battle cry of freedom!

(Chorus)

So we're springing to the call from the East and from the West,
Shouting the battle cry of Freedom;
And we'll hurl the rebel crew from the land we love the best,
Shouting the battle cry of Freedom.

(Chorus)

== Extended lyrics (Union version) ==
As published in Hoge, The Boys in Blue (1867) pp. 477–479.

Oh we'll rally round the flag, boys,
We'll rally once again,
Shouting the battle-cry of freedom;
We will rally from the hill-side,
We will gather from the plain,
Shouting the battle-cry of freedom.

(Chorus)

The Union forever! Hurrah, boys, hurrah!
Down with the Traitors, up with the Stars;
While we rally round the flag, boys,
Rally once again,
Shouting the battle-cry of freedom!

We are springing to the call
Of our brothers gone before,
Shouting the battle-cry of freedom;
And we'll fill the vacant ranks
With a million freemen more,
Shouting the battle-cry of freedom.

(Chorus)

We will welcome to our number
The loyal, true and brave,
Shouting the battle-cry of freedom.
And although he may be poor,
He shall never be a slave,
Shouting the battle-cry of freedom!

(Chorus)

So we're springing to the call
From the East and from the West,
Shouting the battle-cry of freedom;
And we'll hurl the Rebel crew
From the land we love the best,
Shouting the battle-cry of freedom.

(Chorus)

We are marching to the field, boys,
Going to the fight,
Shouting the battle-cry of freedom;
And we'll bear the glorious Stars
Of the Union and the Right,
Shouting the battle-cry of freedom.

(Chorus)

We'll meet the Rebel host, boys,
With fearless hearts and true,
Shouting the battle-cry of freedom;
And we'll show what Uncle Sam
Has for loyal men to do,
Shouting the battle-cry of freedom.

(Chorus)

If we fail amid the fray, boys,
We will face them to the last,
Shouting the battle-cry of freedom;
And our comrades brave shall hear us,
As we are rushing past,
Shouting the battle-cry of freedom.

(Chorus)

Yes, for Liberty and Union,
We are springing to the fight,
Shouting the battle-cry of freedom;
And the victory shall be ours,
Forever rising in our might,
Shouting the battle-cry of freedom.

(Chorus)

== Lyrics (Confederate version) ==
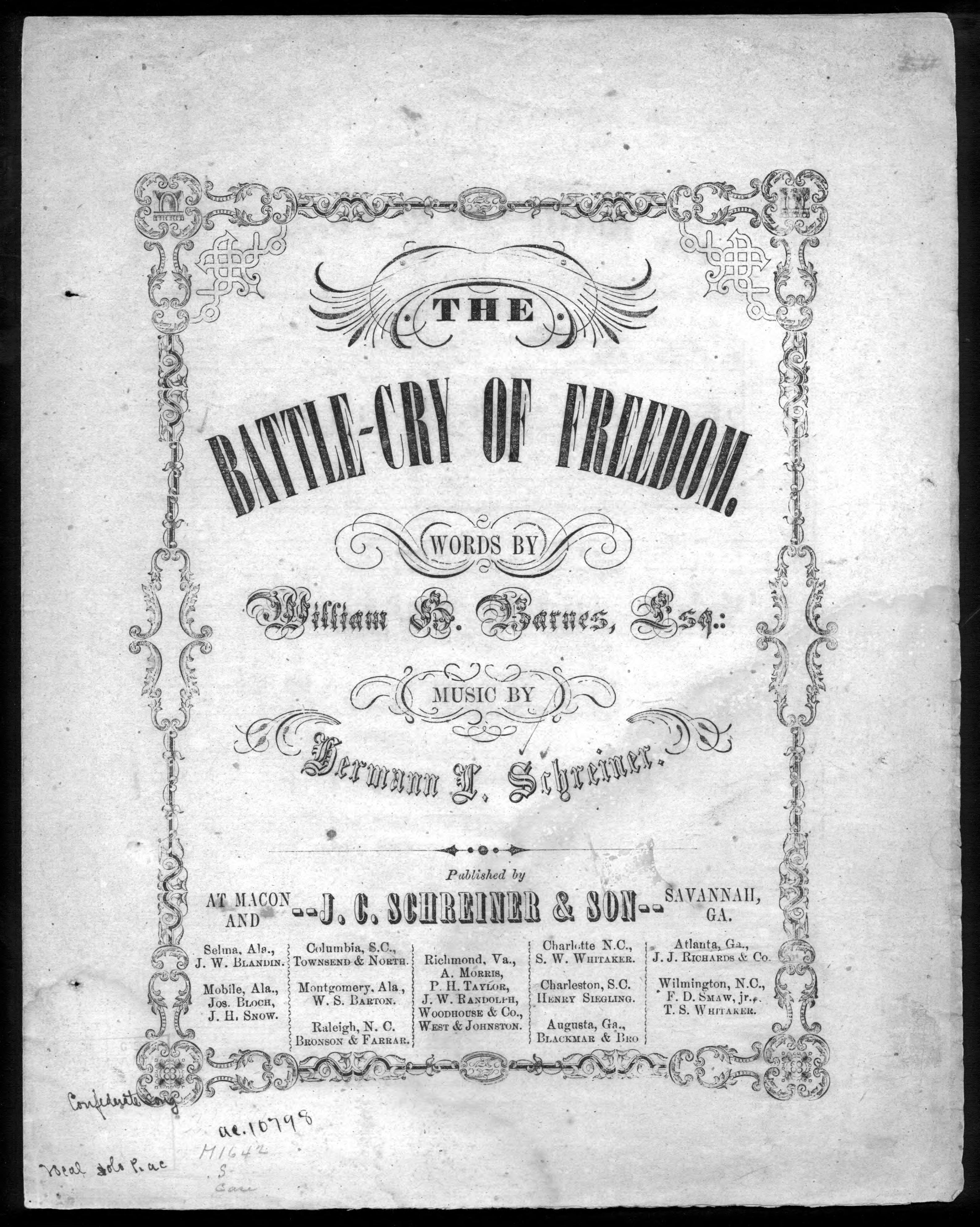

Our flag is proudly floating on the land and on the main,
Shout, shout the battle cry of Freedom!
Beneath it oft we've conquered, and we'll conquer oft again!
Shout, shout the battle cry of Freedom!

(Chorus)
Our Dixie forever! She's never at a loss!
Down with the eagle and up with the cross
While we rally 'round the Bonnie flag, we'll rally once again,
Shout, shout the battle cry of Freedom!

Our gallant boys have marched to the rolling of the drums.
Shout, shout the battle cry of Freedom!
And the leaders in charge cry out, "Come, boys, come!"
Shout, shout the battle cry of Freedom!

(Chorus)

They have laid down their lives on the bloody battle field.
Shout, shout the battle cry of Freedom!
Their motto is resistance – "To the tyrants never yield!"
Shout, shout the battle cry of Freedom!

(Chorus)

While our boys have responded and to the fields have gone!
Shout, shout the battle cry of freedom!
Our noble women also have aided them at home!
Shout, shout the battle cry of freedom!

(Chorus)

== Chorus (1864 election campaign) ==
For Lincoln and Johnson, hurrah, boys, hurrah!
Down with the rebellion and on with the war,
While we rally round the cause, boys, we'll rally in our might,
Singing the holy cause of freemen.

== In popular culture ==
- The song is sung by a marching unit of Union infantry in the film The Undefeated (1969).
- Ry Cooder performed this song as "Rally 'Round the Flag" on his Boomer's Story album.
- The song is also performed in The Long Riders (1980), with music produced by Cooder. In the film, former Confederate irregular Clell Miller (played by Randy Quaid) confronts a musician playing this song, and forces him at gunpoint to play I'm a Good Ol' Rebel instead. (Note: This is probably an anachronism, as the latter song was not copyrighted until 1915, well after the scene in question, presumably in the 1870s. An edition of the sheet music of "The Good Old Rebel" is "RESPECTFULLY DEDICATED TO THE HON. THAD STEVENS", who died on August 11, 1868. An entry in a 1910 edition of Library of Southern Authors (1910), Vol. 15, "Randolph, James Innes, Jr.", says that the author, Major Innes Randolph, had died on April 29, 1887.)
- Eric Taylor has a live recording of this song as "Rally 'Round the Flag" on his Hollywood Pocketknife album in 2007.
- Keith and Rusty McNeil perform both the "Battle Cry of Freedom" and "Southern Battle Cry of Freedom" on Civil War Songs with Historical Narration (WEM Records, 1989, ISBN 1-878360-11-6).
- This song features prominently in Ken Burns' documentary The Civil War, where it is performed by Jacqueline Schwab.
- Billy Bragg wrote a song based upon the music of "Battle Cry of Freedom" called "There Is Power in a Union" on the Talking with the Taxman about Poetry album. This song has different music and words than the song of the same name written by Joe Hill. For example, the chorus goes:
  The Union forever defending our rights
  Down with the blackleg, all workers unite
  With our brothers and our sisters from many far off lands
  There is power in a Union
  This version of the song is featured prominently as the finale to the 2014 film Pride, about London organization Lesbians and Gays Support the Miners support for striking miners of a Welsh pit village during the UK miners' strike (1984–85).
- The song was also featured briefly in Back to the Future Part III during the clock dedication scene and appears on the 25th anniversary addition of the soundtrack by Allan Silvestri.
- The song titled "Rally Round The Flag" was featured on Flamin' Groovies lead vocalist Chris Wilson's 1993 solo Record Random Centuries in which he sings all vocal harmonies (based on Ry Cooder's version).
- Homer and Jethro (Henry Haynes and Ken Burns) released a 1967 parody called "The Ballad of Roger Miller" that used music from "Battle Cry of Freedom" in the verses.
- Rally Round the Flag, Boys!, a 1958 film, was based on a novel with the same title by Max Shulman, published in 1956.
- Indie rock band Titus Andronicus employ an adaptation of "Battle Cry of Freedom" in "A More Perfect Union", the first song on their Civil War-themed 2010 album The Monitor. The altered verses include references to Jefferson Davis, the Confederate leader, and abolitionist John Brown.
- Film composer John Williams, in his score for the 2012 Steven Spielberg film Lincoln, used an excerpt from "The Battle Cry of Freedom" in the track "Call to Muster and Battle Cry", with vocals performed by the Chicago Symphony Chorus and music performed by the Chicago Symphony Orchestra. The song is also sung by Republican members of the House of Representatives to celebrate passage of the 13th Amendment.
- Elvis Costello sang and played the last lines of the song in the Two and a Half Men episode, "Back Off, Mary Poppins".
- The song is played at the dedication of the Hill Valley Courthouse (clock tower) in Back to the Future Part III (1990), in a scene set in 1885.
- The song is sung during the opening credits of the 1939 film Young Mr. Lincoln starring Henry Fonda and directed by John Ford.
- The song is sung by Miriam Hopkins in the 1940 film Virginia City.
- The song with possible lyrics from Ireland was sung by The Irish Rovers in Episode 1 of Season 7 of The Virginian.
- The song was covered by rock band Bon Iver at a campaign rally for Kamala Harris's 2024 presidential campaign.

== See also ==
- Battle cry
- "Battle Hymn of the Republic"

== Bibliography ==
- Collins, Ace. Songs Sung, Red, White, and Blue: The Stories Behind America's Best-Loved Patriotic Songs. HarperResource, 2003. ISBN 0060513047
- Irwin Silber, Songs of the Civil War , Dover, 1995.
- Silverman, Jerry (April 15, 2011). Ballads and Songs of the Civil War. Pacific, Missouri: Mel Bay Publications, Inc. ISBN 9781610650182.
- Hoge, Jane Curry Blaikie (1867). The Boys in Blue. Chicago, Illinois: E. B. Treat & Co.
