= The Nifty Nineties =

1941 Mickey Mouse cartoon

- Theatrical release poster
- Directed by: Riley Thomson
- Produced by: Walt Disney
- Starring: Walt Disney; Marcellite Garner; Ward Kimball; Fred Moore; Florence Gill; Gertrude Lawrence
- Music by: Charles Wolcott
- Animation by: Ward Kimball; Walt Kelly; Fred Moore; Claude Smith; David Swift; Les Clark; Art Fitzpatrick (effects)
- Layouts by: Charles Conner
- Color process: Technicolor
- Production company: Walt Disney Productions
- Distributed by: RKO Radio Pictures (original); Buena Vista Distribution (reissue)
- Release date: June 20, 1941
- Running time: 9 minutes
- Country: United States
- Language: English

The Nifty Nineties is an animated short film produced in Technicolor by Walt Disney Productions and released to theaters on June 20, 1941, by RKO Radio Pictures. The animated short was directed by Riley Thomson and animated by Ward Kimball, Walt Kelly, Fred Moore, Claude Smith, David Swift, and Les Clark with effects animation by Art Fitzpatrick. It was the 113th short in the Mickey Mouse film series to be released, and the fourth in that year. The film stars Mickey and Minnie Mouse and romanticizes the decade of the 1890s.

The film features original and adapted music by Charles Wolcott. The voice cast includes Walt Disney as Mickey and Marcellite Garner as Minnie. Animators Ward Kimball and Fred Moore have cameos where they each voice a caricatured version of themselves.

== Plot ==
Mickey and Minnie meet in The Nifty Nineties.

Set in the springtime, sometime in the 1890s, Mickey and Minnie Mouse happen to meet each other in a public park one day. Minnie attracts Mickey by intentionally dropping her handkerchief so that Mickey will return it to her.

They attend a vaudeville show where they first see a slideshow presentation called "Father, Dear, Father", which features the song "Come Home, Father" by Henry Clay Work. In the show, a daughter attempts to get her father to leave a local tavern because he had not come right home from work as promised and got drunk at the tavern. In the fourth picture in the slideshow, we see the clock tower, which reads 1:00 am. With the mother home watching since tea and her son very sick in her arms, there can only be hope that the father comes home, but the father is too drunk to listen to the daughter, eventually forcing her to bring her father home herself. The slideshow causes Minnie to cry, but Mickey tries to comfort her, saying, "Don't take it so hard. It's only a show". The final slide shows a postcard with the words P.S. "He came home!", indicating that the father and daughter had made it back home.

The next act is "Fred & Ward, Two Clever Boys From Illinois" which features two song and dance men. Fred and Ward are caricatures of Disney animators Fred Moore and Ward Kimball, who also voiced the characters.

After the show is over, Mickey and Minnie cruise the roads of the countryside in a Brass Era car. Goofy rides by on a penny-farthing bicycle (which topples over), and Donald Duck, Daisy Duck, Huey, Dewey and Louie ride on a bicycle built for five. At last, in a scene reminiscent of Plane Crazy, the car crashes with a cow. Mickey and Minnie emerge from the wreckage unhurt, but when they try to kiss each other, the cow pops her head up between them.

== Voice cast ==
- Mickey Mouse: Walt Disney
- Minnie Mouse: Marcellite Garner
- Fred: Fred Moore
- Ward: Ward Kimball
- Hens: Florence Gill And Gertrude Lawrence
- Singers: Thurl Ravenscroft, Max Smith, John Rarig, Bill Days

== Songs ==
Except one song, "The Gay Nineties" (the opening song), this short featured mostly authentic songs which would have been familiar around this era, most of which were performed by the vocal quartet The Sportsmen, which featured Thurl Ravenscroft in one of his earliest projects for Disney.

The songs include:

- "The Fountain in the Park"
- "Come Home, Father"
- "There'll Be a Hot Time in the Old Town Tonight"
- "Old Folks at Home"
- "In the Good Old Summertime"

== Notes ==
Part of the dance sequence with Fred and Ward was reused in a scene in Jiminy Cricket's You and Your Senses of Taste and Smell.

== Home media ==
The short was released on May 18, 2004, on Walt Disney Treasures: Mickey Mouse in Living Color, Volume Two: 1939-Today. and on the DVD of Walt Disney's Pollyanna.

== See also ==
- Mickey Mouse (film series)
