= Come Home, Father =

1864 temperance song by Henry Clay Work

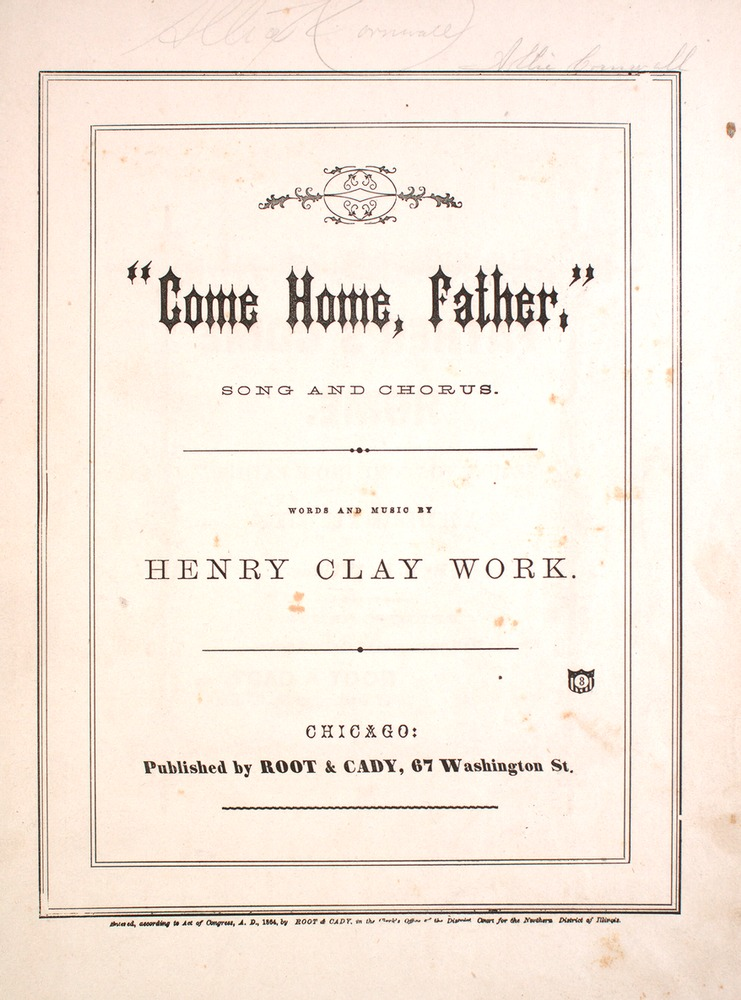
1864 sheet music cover, published by Root & Cady

"Come Home, Father" (also known as "Father, Dear Father" or "Father, Dear Father, Come Home") is a temperance song written by Henry Clay Work. It is a sentimental tale told by Mary, a young girl who exhorts her drunken father to return home from the tavern while her brother Benny slowly dies. As with many other nineteenth-century songs, "Come Home, Father" renders the home an uncorrupted haven from the outside world and sets women, supposedly pure, domestic beings, apart from villainous men.

Published by Root & Cady in 1864, it achieved immense success and left a pronounced mark on the American temperance movement's verse; the Woman's Christian Temperance Union chose it as their anthem. The movement, then largely vouching for abstinence from alcohol, had been running for decades and would achieve mass organization after the Civil War. According to some academic sources, "Come Home Father" is the most famous temperance song. Root & Cady's magazine boasted that only one in a thousand of its readers who read the song's lyrics refrained from crying. With time, however, it fell out of fashion and often came to be performed sneeringly. Numerous writers since as late as the mid-twentieth century have found Work's piece mawkish or unappealing to modern tastes, yet it lent itself to audiences in its day.

== Background ==
=== The temperance movement ===
At its simplest, the word temperance means personal restraint and moderation, and this is the sense which early temperance writers of the 1830s applied. In the mid-nineteenth century, it changed to refer to abstinence from drink, then conversion of drunkards, and then laws against alcohol sale and use. The transition out of plain restrained living was, according to the music historian George W. Ewing, a needed one, since "grave-bound, withered workers could scarcely be expected to keep [such] a cause alive". Around the 1870s, those fronting the American temperance movement were no longer reformed drunkards but lifetime teetotalers; thus, its motives shifted from sympathy to the ailing to a steadfast fear of drink. By the start of the next century, temperance often came to mean the same as prohibition. Ewing brings up the general drift in social reform toward institutional, collective effort around this time: earlier temperance literature probed the ills of alcohol on drunkards and their family, often through stereotypes, and later verse demanded political movement and organization and white ribbons. However, the professor Paul D. Sanders notes that, as reflected in school songbooks, there was no straight advance from moral appeals to political pressure; rather, each went through crests and lulls.

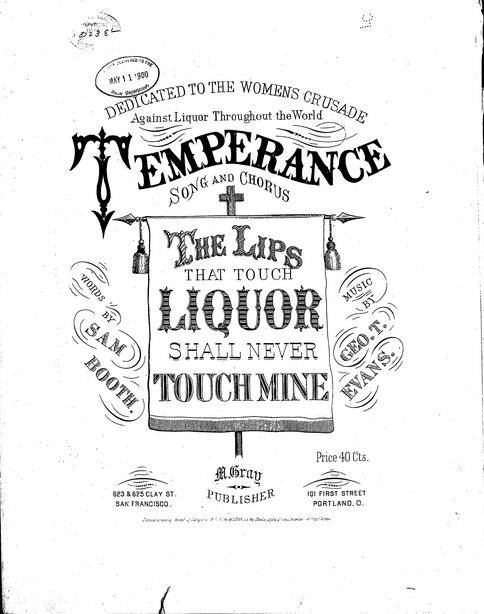
Sheet music cover of Sam Booth and George T. Evans's "The Lips That Touch Liquor Shall Never Touch Mine"

The temperance movement, sometimes deemed the oldest in United States history, began around the dawn of the nineteenth century and seized a breakthrough in the 1840s. Some former drunkards grouped together and founded the Washingtonian movement to ignite abstinence from intoxicating drink; such a message found refuge in public gatherings, societies in various towns, and church leadership. It grew to invite hundreds of thousands of converts. By 1855, thirteen states had prohibition laws, although nine would curtail or erase them shortly after. After a brief hiccup during the Civil War (1861–65), the movement gained as fraternities like the Woman's Christian Temperance Union formed to fight alcohol. The movement after the war was in fact overwhelmingly fronted by women. 1869 saw the start of the Prohibition Party, which would raise temperance to a national issue but earn only modest success in elections.

Twenty-four years later, the zealous Anti-Saloon League breathed new life into temperance activism by pressing for a ban on alcohol sale precinct by precinct and, thenceforth, across the country. It steered away from parties and did content itself with the passage of some local laws; "the saloon must go" was its watchword. Over time, it garnered great political strength. And by 1919, both chambers of Congress and enough states had sanctioned a law to forbid making, selling, and spreading alcohol: the Eighteenth Amendment. The Twenty-first Amendment of 1933 then ended prohibition. According to the scholar Holland Webb, temperance teachings in schools and skillful leadership of the League helped the movement, along with sizeable support from the public who were mostly not worried about morality but about the economic effects of drink.

Sanders finds two methods by which the temperance movement stoked reform: moral suasion, which "appealed to the emotion and intellect of the drinker when arguing the case for abstinence", and coercion, "focused instead on laws and force to eliminate the alcohol problem". Poetry and music themed on temperance began to catch on around 1830, much in line with the swellling influence of the movement as a whole. As Ewing notes: "Many, if not most, of the hymnbooks of the late nineteenth and early twentieth centuries contain at least two or three temperance hymns." Often dressed in plain and lucid melodies and lyrics, they usually discussed family and the home, the perks of cold water, pledging to abstain, voting, religion, the 'temperance army', and 'bewaring of the cup'; the words were often stamped onto already existing tunes. Reform-minded verse, then dominant, was a foremost medium through which the movement's message sounded among the masses. Drunkards were framed as sinful and guilty of the degeneration of lives throughout the country; they shook stable families. Thus, much music militantly thrust listeners, especially children, to act, to 'improve society'. After the Eighteenth Amendment's passage, temperance meetings were largely no longer needed, and songs turned toward the newly-found fortunes of speakeasies and smugglers. The amendment's repeal thirteen years later extinguished temperance verse. Ewing writes:

People born since that date either are totally unfamiliar with temperance songs and poems or have heard only a few of the more throat-catching ones (like "Father, dear father, come home with me now") irreverently sung to divert rather than convert.

=== The composer ===
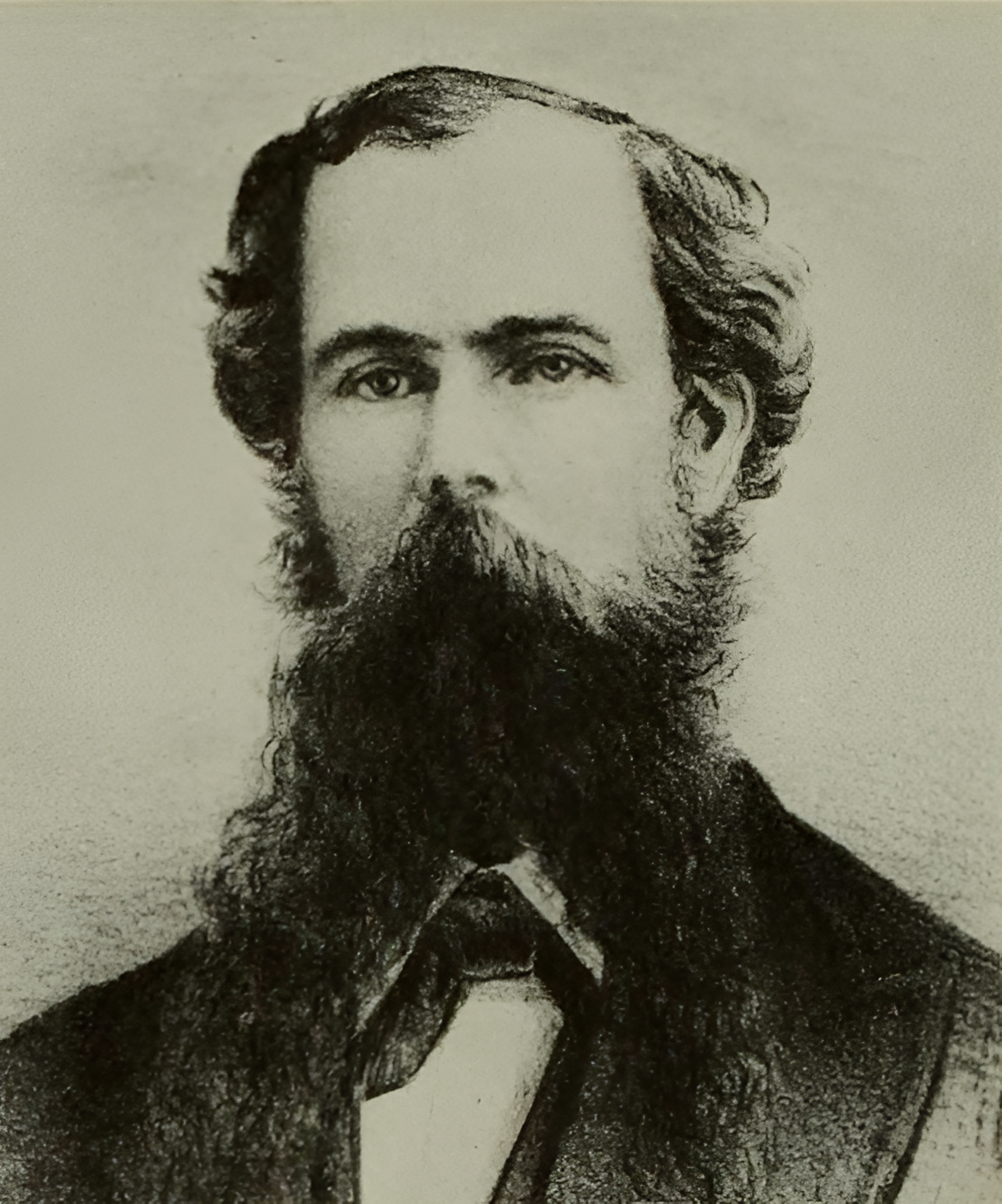
An illustration of Work, seen in David Ewen's Popular American Composers (1962)

Henry Clay Work (1832–1884), a Connecticut native who moved to Chicago as a young adult, started writing full songs in 1853. He partnered with the music firm Root & Cady around the time war broke out and published twenty-nine songs with them over five years; many are abolitionist or topical pieces mirroring the attitudes of Union civilians. Among these there are "Kingdom Coming", an antislavery song telling of a master's flight from his plantation and later capture by his slaves; the comical "Grafted into the Army", a widow's cynical narration of her son's enlistment; "Little Major", a story of a dying drummer boy laid on the battlefield and soldiers passing him by; and the triumphant "Marching Through Georgia" portraying Sherman's March to the Sea.

The scholar Jon W. Finson writes that Work devoutly committed himself to social progress and infused many of his songs with "a pronounced moralistic zeal". This, Finson thinks, descended from his childhood. When he was three, his father Alanson shifted the family to Illinois and turned the family home into an Underground Railroad station, a network for fugitive slaves to flee to freedom; Work's time among the freed slaves came to seep into his songwriting. Reportedly a teetotaler his whole life long, he was a fervent advocate of temperance and gave to the movement through song. "Come Home, Father" is a sentimental ballad that speaks his ardent beliefs about the matter. In Finson's opinion, Work was "[the] master of the temperance song" and "the ultimate composer of quintessentially realistic popular song during the sixties and seventies". He moved past war anthems after the war and settled into balladry.

== Lyrics ==
The lyrics as inscribed in the Dodgeville Chronicle of June 9, 1864, with an opening message

As printed in Bertram G. Work's Songs of Henry Clay Work, the epigraph to the song's lyrics reads:

'Tis The SONG OF LITTLE MARY,
Standing at the bar-room door
While shameful midnight revel
Rages wildly as before.

The lyrics are given thus:

Father, dear father, come home with me now!
The clock in the steeple strikes one;
You said you were coming right home from the shop,
As soon as your day's work was done.
Our fire has gone out, our house is all dark,
And mother's been watching since tea, —
With poor brother Benny so sick in her arms
And no one to help her but me. —
Come home! come home! come home! —
Please, father, dear father, come home. —

CHORUS:
Hear the sweet voice of the child
Which the night-winds repeat as they roam!
Oh who could resist this most plaintive of prayers?
"Please, father, dear father, come home."

Father, dear father, come home with me now!
The clock in the steeple strikes two;
The night has grown colder, and Benny is worse
But he has been calling for you.
Indeed he is worse, Ma says he will die,
Perhaps before morning shall dawn; —
And this is the message she sent me to bring
"Come quickly, or he will be gone." —
Come home! come home! come home! —
Please, father, dear father, come home. —

(CHORUS)

Father, dear father, come home with me now!
The clock in the steeple strikes three;
The house is so lonely, the hours are so long,
For poor weeping mother and me.
Yes, we are alone, poor Benny is dead,
And gone with the angels of light; —
And these were the very last words that he said
"I want to kiss Papa good night."
Come home! come home! come home! —
Please, father, dear father, come home. —

(CHORUS)

== Composition ==
"Come Home, Father", performed by the Peerless Quartet in 1925

The song is a young girl Mary's plea for her father, then heartlessly trifling away his time and money in a tavern getting drunk, to return home while her brother Benny is slowly dying. She visits him at the tavern and laments that Benny lies sick in his mother's arms with "no one to help her but me". The father pays no heed to Mary. Meanwhile, the steeple clock forebodingly strikes one, then two, and finally three. By the final toll, Benny has died; "I want to kiss papa good night" were his last words. Work assigns two typical roles to the drunkard's children: one pleading, and the other dying. The writer Aline Waites introduces "Come Home, Father" as "a typical temperance song with the familiar characters of the Sick Mother, the Dying Baby and the Innocent Child trying to lure the Drunken Father away from the sinful taverns".

Sheet music in the Songs of Henry Clay Work indicates that "Come Home, Father" is in the key of A-flat major and runs at 6/8 time throughout. An eight-bar instrumental introduction opens the song, and from then on, it follows a simple verse-chorus form. The three verses are each twenty measures long, while the refrain, like the introduction, spans eight bars. During the refrain, the solo singer is to be accompanied by soprano, alto, tenor, and bass voices. No markings about tempo or dynamics are given, but Work indicates that if the chorus cannot be peformed with all vocal parts, one should skip it: "The Song is complete without it." In Finson's words: "The composer's melodic writing exemplifies the ease and fluidity attained in the best popular songs from this period, which often feature an increasingly chromatic palette." He also praises the choruses' close parts.

While "Come Home, Father" is overtly emotional, it is also realistic in borrowing characters and human features from everyday life; it follows closely personal, domestic feelings. Sentimental music stood as a foremost genre during the Civil War, a time when romanticism and Victorian-era sentimentalism were fashionable. Many such songs markedly touched human feelings and often concerned themselves with the family, especially mothers, as they relayed a tragic tale of love, death, or (or and) separation; they took on, in the scholar Christian McWhirter's words, "slower, often meandering" melodies. At the time, it was the aim of numerous songwriters to stir up torrentuous emotion in their audiences, and the public favored such songs that struck a chord. The purpose of Work's sentimentalism is to make singers "perform narratives whose lessons they might otherwise not accept", as writes the professor J. M. Mancini, and in this respect, it succeeds. Ewing argues that "Come Home, Father" may be performed variously: as a temperance teaching, as a satire of temperance teachings, as an attack on bathetic balladry, or as a "pathetic" song; he suspects that it found its way in nineteenth-century songbooks because of the last reason: "A person in those lachrymose days could weep through 'Just a Bird in a Gilded Cage,' 'After the Ball,' or 'Woodman, Spare That Tree,' without being antiwealth, antidance, or even antilumbering." Following a common motif in nineteenth-century verse, Finson thinks the song, particularly its chorus, presents the home as a pure, clean space cut off from "the hard outside world".

The literature scholar Brian Wilkie sees in "Come Home, Father" some oratorical flourishes typical of sentimental works. These are repetition, as in the reiterated phrase "come home"; rhetorical questions ("Oh, who could resist this most plaintive of prayers?"), and colloquial expressions, as in "Ma". Rather than preach or harangue listeners for their godless treachery, Work, observes Mancini, tries to persuade them that drink hurts the family and brings about apathy. His approach to death thrives on humanism and an urge to impart empathetic social beliefs, not merely on Victorian-age attitudes.

== Reception and legacy ==
That it has done a great and good work in the reformation of the drunkard there can be no doubt.

— George Birdseye, 1879

'Mother has been praised in all sorts of songs for centuries. ... [Why] don't somebody reach into the soup pot and place Papa on the pinnacle of fame by writing a dacent song about him?'

— Isidore Witmark, quoting J. W. Kelly, 1939

Root & Cady published "Come Home, Father" in the spring of 1864, and it was first performed as a number in William W. Pratt's temperance play Ten Nights in a Barroom, an adaptation of Timothy Shay Arthur's 1854 novel. However, the academic Annemarie McAllister writes that it had been sung in Pratt's play since 1858 under the title "Little Mary's Song"; Waites agrees, relating: "In the play the Innocent Child does eventually persuade the Father to come home, but is then struck on the head by a drinking glass which was aimed at the Father—and little Mary expires with Poor Weeping Mother and Contrite Father beside her." The music historian David Ewen instead writes that it was fashioned after Arthur's novel.

"Come Home, Father" proved, in the biographer Polly H. Carder's words, a "tremendous hit". It was also issued in the United Kingdom, where it met great success. Ewen notes that it grew "prodigiously" famous after featuring in a production of Ten Nights in a Barroom as the play's emotional climax. Work later wrote more temperance songs such as "Lillie of the Snow-Storm" (1866) and "King Bibler's Army" (1877), although none won the fame of "Come Home, Father". The first of these, an attempt to the seize the fortune of his 1864 hit, sees a mother and child roam toward a forlorn shack on the prairie after the father comes home drunk; the mother dies on the way.

In a 1879 profile of the composer, George Birdseye deems "Come Home, Father" Work's second best-known work, behind "Grandfather's Clock" (1876). According to him, it was "the pioneer and pattern for all the many temperance pieces now in the market, not a few of which are very palpable imitations". Finson names Susan Parkhurst's "Father's a Drunkard and Mother Is Dead" (1868) as an example, which boasts the line: "Dark is the night, and the storm rages wild, / God pity Bessie, the drunkard's lone child"; more songs descended from it were "I Want to Kiss Papa Goodnight" and others with kindred beginnings or resolutions like "Oh papa don't go out tonight". Quoting Bratton, McAllister comments that these appropriations show how temperance verse with "genuine popular themes" was sometimes "reabsorbed into the mainstream of popular poetry". Moreover, Finson argues that the forceful rift between woman and man as presented in "Come Home, Father" and in many other songs of the time left an impression; women were made into undefiled beings safely secured in their homes, and men became devils who wrought harm with their public manner. "After Henry Clay Work, it was difficult to rehabilitate 'the stronger sex'", he concludes.

Ewing describes "Come Home, Father" as one of two works constituting "the apex of temperance verse" in the public's eyes. The New Grove Dictionary of 2001 and McAllister (2016) suggest that it is the most famous temperance song. Work said he received hundreds of appreciative letters, and one Louisianan even wrote to him requesting a song that would urge her husband to quit his affair with an enchanting woman and return home; Work never wrote it. A hallmark of temperance meetings, "Come Home, Father" was adopted as the Woman's Christian Temperance Union's theme tune; the Prohibition Party also made it their official song upon convening in Oswego, New York. However, the individually-minded temperance song eventually fell out of style. At the turn of the twentieth century, songs extolling gathered, collective struggle toward prohibition and rally songs began to supersede the old standards. The Union stopped printing "Come Home, Father" and other compositions about "the ills of drunkness" or "tears-and-terror poems" in its Union Signal by 1932. Twenty-five years later, the writer Edwin Tribble remarked that the song was "[little] remembered".

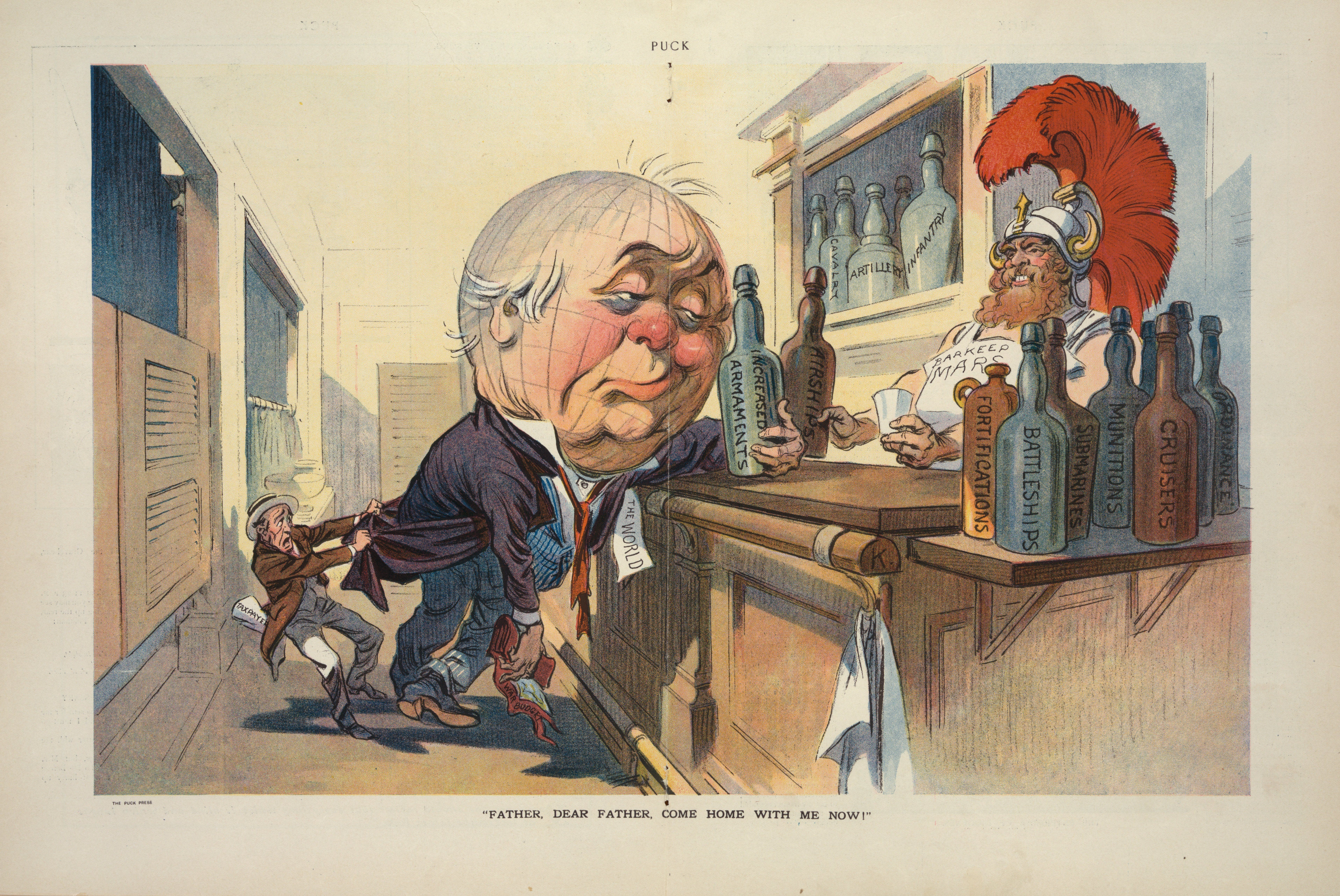
A 1913 satirical Puck cartoon decrying the expenses of military spending; its subtitle references the song.

In June 1864, Root and Cady's magazine The Song Messenger of the Northwest pledged to gift free sheet music for "Come Home, Father" to those who ingested the words and stayed tearless. They later bragged that out of the magazine's ten thousand readers, only ten managed. In an 1898 editorial, Florine Thayer McCray writes: "[Who] has not sat breathless listening to the rare combination of pathos and harmony with which the changing cadences of human voices plead 'Hear the Sweet Voice of the Child' and felt how much more persuasive and fetching than any temperance sermon was this song... ."

The musicologist Sigmund Spaeth wrote in 1948 that the song's "pathetic" story had come to be derided; it was often taken as a joke and performed in a burlesque manner. Nearly thirty years on, Ewing likewise noted that "Come Home, Father" was often sung to mock the temperance movement. The author Irwin Silber groups the song among Work's teary, "purely maudlin" music that he would venture into following his "Little Major" (1863). McWhirter observes: "To a modern ear, the heightened emotionalism of these songs [the sentimental music of the Civil War-era] may seem overbearing or saccharine and their lyrics simplistic or trite, but mid-nineteenth-century Americans considered them powerful expressions of feeling." And McAllister, writing in 2016, thinks Work's piece can still move listeners. In his 1967 essay, Wilkie resorts to "Come Home, Father" to discuss what sentimentality means; he chooses the "very bad", "notorious late nineteenth-century tearjerker" since he struggled to think of a more fitting case of literature that most people agree is "[extremely]" and "patently" sentimental. Then, a work was often deemed sentimental if it overflowed with feeling or tried to kindle too much feeling relative to the situation. Wilkie dismisses this definition and turns to the reputation of Work's song: the scenario presented in "Come Home, Father" is serious enough to merit teary lyrics, and its attempts to imbue the listener with sorrow therefore make sense since many would have cried in Mary's place; furthermore, the storyline, while possibly fanciful, can be conceived as happening in reality.

== Bibliography ==
- Bailey, Guy; Maynor, Natalie; Cukor-Avila, Patricia (1991). The Emergence of Black English: Text and Commentary. Philadelphia, Pennsylvania: John Benjamins Publishing Company. ISBN 1-55619-161-8.
- Birdseye, George (1879). "America's Song Composers: IV. Henry Clay Work". Potter's American Monthly. 12 (88): 284–288 – via Internet Archive.
- Bowman, Kent A. (1987). Voices of Combat: A Century of Liberty and War Songs, 1765–1865. Westport, CT: Greenwood Press, Inc. ISBN 0-313-25408-7.
- Carder, P. H. (2008). George F. Root, Civil War Songwriter: A Biography. Jefferson, North Carolina: McFarland & Company, Inc. ISBN 978-0-7864-3374-2.
- Ewen, David (1977). All the Years of American Popular Music. Englewood Cliffs, New Jersey: Prentice-Hall, Inc. ISBN 978-0-13-022442-2.
- Ewen, David (1962). Popular American Composers from Revolutionary Times to the Present: A Biographical and Critical Guide. New York City, New York: H. W. Wilson Company. ISBN 978-0824200404.
- Ewing, George W. (1977). The Well-Tempered Lyre: Songs and Verse of the Temperance Movements. Dallas, Texas: Southern Methodist University Press. ISBN 0-870-740-008.
- Finson, Jon W. (1994). The Voices That Are Gone: Themes in Nineteenth-Century American Popular Song. New York City, New York: Oxford University Press. ISBN 0-19-505750-3.
- Howard, John T. (1946). Our American Music: Three Hundred Years of It (3rd ed.). New York City, New York: Thomas Y. Crowell Company. OCLC 423103.
- Hill, Richard S. (1953). "The Mysterious Chord of Henry Clay Work". Notes. 10 (2): 211–225. doi:10.2307/892874. JSTOR 892874.
- Kelley, Bruce C.; Snell, Mark A. (2004). Bugle Resounding: Music and Musicians of the Civil War Era. Columbia, Missouri: University of Missouri Press. ISBN 0-8262-1538-6.
- "Temperance and Prohibition". Library of Congress. Archived from the original on July 24, 2026.
- Mancini, J. M. (2024). "Disaster Country: Henry Clay Work, Forgetting, and the Politics of American Popular Song". Massachusetts Historical Review. 2: 119–154. JSTOR 374718.
- McAllister, Annemarie (2016). "Temperance Battle Songs: The Musical War Against Alcohol". Popular Music. 35 (2): 191–206. JSTOR 24737079.
- McCray, Florine Thayer (January 19, 1898). "About Henry Clay Work". New Haven Morning Journal and Courier.
- McWhirter, Christian (2012). Battle Hymns: The Power and Popularity of Music in the Civil War. Chapel Hill, North Carolina: University of North Carolina Press. ISBN 978-0-8078-3550-0.
- "Henry Clay Work, 'Come Home, Father'". Museum of the Bible. Archived from the original on August 5, 2025.
- Sadie, Stanley; Tyrrell, John, eds. (2001). The New Grove Dictionary of Music and Musicians. Vol. 27 (6 ed.). New York City, New York: Macmillan Publishers. ISBN 1-56159-239-0.
- Sanders, Paul D. (2017). "Temperance Songs in American School Songbooks, 1865–1899". Journal of Historical Research in Music Education. 38 (2): 178–208. doi:10.1177/1536600616667602. JSTOR 26376931.
- Silber, Irwin (1995). Songs of the Civil War. Mineola, New York: Dover Publications. ISBN 0-486-28438-7.
- Spaeth, Sigmund (1948). A History of Popular Music in America. New York City, New York: Random House.
- Tribble, Edwin (1967). "'Marching Through Georgia'". The Georgia Review. 21 (4): 423–429. JSTOR 41396391.
- Waites, Aline (1984). The Illustrated Victorian Songbook. London: Sheldrake Press. ISBN 978-1873329160.
- Webb, Holland (1999). "Temperance Movements and Prohibition". International Social Science Review. 74 (1/2): 61–69. JSTOR 41882294.
- Wilkie, Brian (1967). "What Is Sentimentality?". College English. 28 (8): 564–575. JSTOR 374718.
- Work, Henry C. (n.d.). Work, Bertram G. (ed.). Songs of Henry Clay Work. New York City, New York: Little & Ives.
