= Temperance songs =

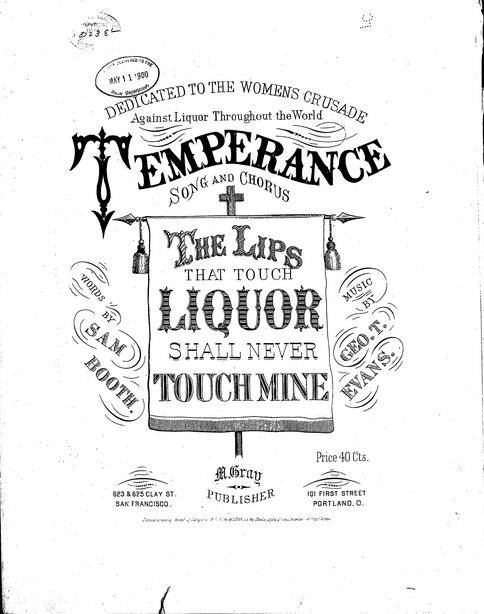
Sheet music cover to "The Lips That Touch Liquor Shall Never Touch Mine" (1874), by Sam Booth and George T. Evans

Temperance songs are those musical compositions that were sung and performed to promote the Temperance Movement from the 1840s to the 1920s. It was a distinct genre of American music. In the early 19th century, the yearly per capita consumption of alcohol in the US was as high as 3.9 U.S. gallons (15 liters) in the 1830s. In response, many temperance organizations formed over the next eighty years. Some temperance song lyrics were sung with already well-known songs of the period, for example, "Oh! Susanna". This Stephen Foster melody was used with lyrics in support of temperance and the title changed to "There's a Good Time Coming", in 1857, ten years after the publication of the original lyrics of "Oh! Susanna".

== Development and genre history ==
A recording of "Molly and the Baby", a temperance song from 1916

A consistent theme within temperance songs of 19th and 20th century society was that drinking negatively impacted a stable family life and that it was at the center of much suffering. "Molly and the Baby Don't You Know" is about a father promising not to drink for the sake of his young child and suffering wife. Some temperance songs were intended to produce guilt about the consequences of alcohol consumption. Themes including abuse were common, such as "The Drunkard's Child," by Mrs. Parkhurst, 1870. In this song, a mother hears her child decry that her father's drinking and their poverty leads to her being ignored by her peers. An archived field-recording of this song, sung by John McCready, relates the song of a dying child of an alcoholic, as the child fears they will not be allowed to enter heaven. Stephen Foster was considered to be the best-known of the Temperance songwriters.

=== Listing of Temperance songs ===
Many of the songs in support of temperance are not completely documented, but a partial listing follows:

Temperance songs
Title	Year	Composer	Lyricist	Known vocalists/recording	References
"Come Home, Father"	1864	Henry Clay Work	Henry Clay Work	The Peerless Quartet	
"The Drunkard's Child"	1870	Mrs Parkhurst		John McCready	
"The Lips That Touch Liquor Will Never Touch Mine"	1874	George T. Evans	Sam Booth		
De brewer's big hosses	1913	J.B. Herbert	H.S. Taylor	Wilfred Glenn, Harry Macdonough, Lambert Murphy	
"Molly and the Baby Don't You Know"	1916	J. B. Herbert	H. S. Taylor	Homer Rodeheaver	
"Alcoholic blues"	1919	Albert Von Tilzer	Edward Laska	Edward Laska, All Star Trio	
What-cha gonna do when there ain't no jazz?	1920	Pete Wendling	Edgar Leslie	Ester Walker	
How are you goin' to wet your whistle	1920	Percy Wenrich	Francis Barry Byrne	Bill Murray	

== Stephen Foster ==
=== Comrades, Fill No Glass for Me ===
Foster's Temperance song, “Comrades, Fill No Glass for Me” (1855), is thought to be a narrative of his own drinking struggle. The melody to these lyrics is unknown.

Oh, comrades, fill no glass for me,
To drown my soul in liquid flame,
For if I drank, the toast should be
To blighted fortune, health and fame.
Yet, though I long to quell the strife,
That passion holds against my life,
Though boon companions ye may be,
Oh! comrades, fill no glass for me.

=== A License Party Trick (sung to the tune of Oh! Susanna) ===
There was a great election once, (We need not name the date,)

Out in Ohio, and it lost Republicans the State.

That party runs the Government With still house revenue,

And boasts much of its temperance, From its “high license” view.

(chorus)

Oh, high license,

How is that for high?

You’ll make your party very sick and

It will surely die.

etc, etc

This temperance song was sung to the tune of "Oh! Susanna", and was written in response to abolitionist and legislative developments of the times. In 1851, the state of Maine established statewide prohibition. Other states subsequently adopted similar legislation. "A License Party Trick" specifically refers to legislation passed in 1883 in Ohio when Republicans lost the governorship and the majority in the state House and senate. An attempt by the ousted legislators and Governor Charles Foster (no relation to Stephen) to tax and regulate alcohol sales resulted in the loss of support of temperance supporters. Voters found the politician's attempts at legislation as too liberal. The legislative defeat was also attributed to the lack of support of German and Irish voters who believed the proposed liquor policies to be overly restrictive.

== Other songwriters ==
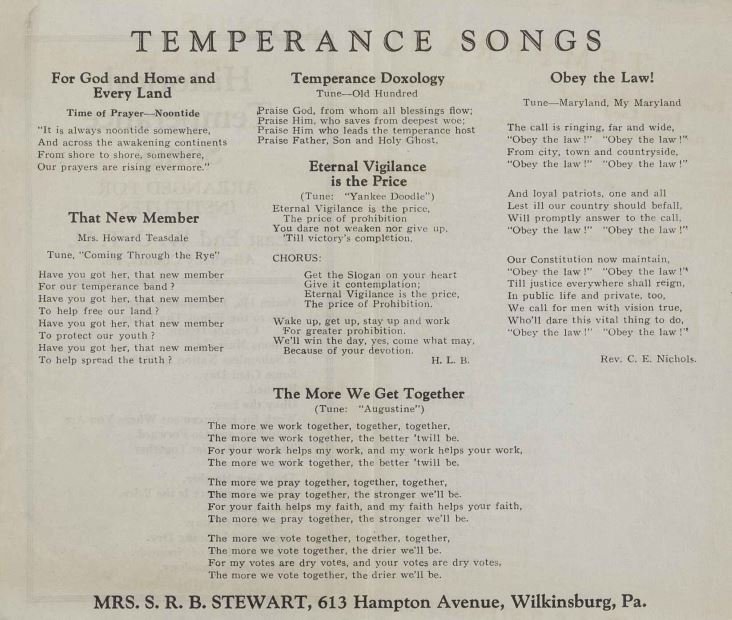
This is the songbook used at the Women's Temperance Organization from Wilkinsburg, PA.

From the 1840s to 1920, the American Temperance Movement produced a large number of songs. Some of the more notable composers were Stephen Foster, Mrs. E.A. Parkhurst, M. Evans, George F. Root, and Henry Work. Another specific example of a popular song of the times is "The Drunkard's Child," by Mrs. Parkhurst written in 1870. In the song a child complains to her mother that she is ignored by others because she is poor and her father drinks.

The temperance songwriters tended to write songs sympathetic to the Union cause. This is in contrast to Stephen Foster who wrote minstrel songs. This genre is seen as racist today, even though Foster also provided music for We Are Coming, Father Abra'am, a song encouraging Northerners to enlist in the Union Army. Foster differed from the other temperance composers in that he also wrote drinking songs. Some historians believe that Foster drank heavily.

James Lord Pierpont, composer of “Jingle Bells,” created temperance songs with the melody of this still popular holiday tune.

== Songs of Temperance organizations ==
Some locally organized temperance organizations printed and published their own temperance songs, some of which were derived from hymns. For example, the doxology has been modified with the following lyrics:

Praise God from Whom all blessings flow,

Praise him who saves from deepest woe,

Praise him who leads the temperance host,

Praise Father, Son and Holy Ghost.

== See also ==
- Tom Gray's Dream
