= Thomas Gray (disambiguation) =

Thomas Gray was an English poet, classical scholar and professor of Cambridge University.

Thomas Gray may also refer to:

== Sports ==
- Tom Gray (footballer, born 1875) (1875–1944), English footballer
- Tommy Gray (footballer) (1913–1992), Scottish footballer and football club manager
- Tommy Gray (rugby union) (1917–2000), Scotland international rugby union player
- Thomas Gray (rower) (born 1936), Canadian Olympic rower
- Tom Gray (speed skater) (born 1945), American Olympic speed skater
- Thomas Gray (soccer) (born 1986), American soccer player

== Musicians ==
- Tom Gray (bluegrass musician) (born 1941), American bluegrass musician
- Tom Gray (guitarist) (1951–2021), American musician with Delta Moon
- Tom Gray, frontman for the 1980s rock band The Brains
- Tom Gray (activist), English rock singer, composer, and activist

== Other ==
- Thomas Grey (chronicler) (died 1369), chronicler, whose surname is often spelled 'Gray'
- Thomas Gray (1788–1848), British railway advocate
- Thomas R. Gray (1800–1845), American lawyer and author
- Thomas Gray (surveyor) (1832–1890), Board of Trade
- Thomas Lomar Gray (1850–1908), British engineer
- Thomas Cecil Gray (1913–2008), English anaesthetist
- Thomas Gray (VC) (1914–1940), English recipient of the Victoria Cross

== See also ==
- "Tom Gray's Dream", poem
- Thomas Grey (disambiguation)
