= Thomas de Grey =

Thomas de Grey may refer to:

- Thomas de Grey (1680–1765), MP for Norfolk 1715–27
- Thomas de Grey (1717–1781), MP for Norfolk 1764–74
- Thomas de Grey, 2nd Baron Walsingham (1748–1818), MP for Wareham 1774, Tamworth 1774–80 and Lostwithiel 1780–81
- Thomas de Grey, 2nd Earl de Grey (1781–1859), British Tory politician and statesman
- Thomas de Grey, 4th Baron Walsingham (1788–1839), British peer
- Thomas de Grey, 5th Baron Walsingham (1804–1870), British peer
- Thomas de Grey, 6th Baron Walsingham (1843–1919), English politician and amateur entomologist

== See also ==
- Thomas Grey (disambiguation)
