= Henry Clay Work =

American songwriter and composer (1832–1884)

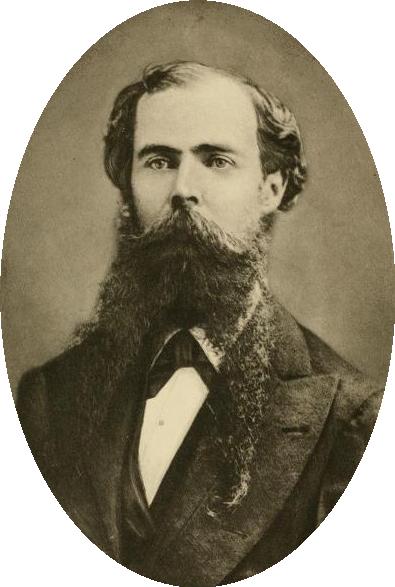
- Work in an undated photograph
- Born: October 1, 1832; Middletown, Connecticut, U.S.
- Died: June 8, 1884 (aged 51); Hartford, Connecticut
- Notable work: "Kingdom Coming" (1862) "Grafted into the Army" (1862) "Come Home, Father" (1864) "Marching Through Georgia" (1865) "The Ship That Never Returned" (1865) "Grandfather's Clock" (1876)

Signature
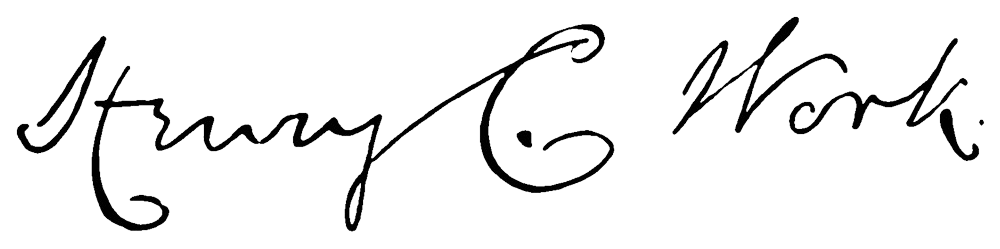

Henry Clay Work (October 1, 1832 – June 8, 1884) was an American songwriter and composer. His musical contributions to the Union in the American Civil War document the afflictions of slavery, the hardships of army life, and Northern triumphs in the conflict. Besides wartime pieces, he wrote sentimental ballads and songs supporting the growing temperance movement. Many of Work's earlier compositions were performed at minstrel shows.

Work's father, Alanson, was an abolitionist who strove to free fugitive slaves. While a youth, Henry initiated a career in printing, one that lasted his entire life. Although lacking formal music training, his penchant for song showed itself early on as he wrote poems for newspapers and set them to music. Work first published a complete musical piece in 1853, and his career came of age at the Civil War's outbreak. Work collaborated with the Chicagoan publishing firm Root & Cady to compose twenty-seven songs, some of which, such as "Kingdom Coming" (1862) and "Marching Through Georgia" (1865), were among the most popular of the war.

After the war, Work ventured in often somber balladry, but familial and financial woes and Root & Cady's closure would drain his motivation. He quit writing songs altogether for a few years. After deciding to work with Chauncey M. Cady in 1876, his output briefly resurged; this yielded a single major hit, "Grandfather's Clock" (1876), the best-selling song of his career and possibly the best-known American song of the decade. Nonetheless, Work could not resurrect his wartime fame and fortune, and he died nearly forgotten at age fifty-one.

Work was one of the most successful American musicians of the 1860s and 1870s. Sometimes crowned the bard of Union song alongside George F. Root, he expressed deftness in African-American dialect, comedy, melody, and social consciousness. His work built on the popular verse-chorus form, and the music historian Kent A. Bowman argues that his minstrel pieces written in dialect, along with those of other writers, influenced ragtime and jazz.

== Life and career ==
=== Upbringing and youth ===
Henry Clay Work, named for the statesman and former House speaker Henry Clay, was born on October 1, 1832, in Middletown, Connecticut. The Work family was of Scottish origin; their surname derived from Auld Wark, an important stronghold during the Anglo-Scottish wars. To evade religious persecution, some of the family migrated to the north of Ireland. Joseph Work moved to the United States soon after, in 1720, and settled in Ashford, Connecticut. All the family patriarchs descended from him, at least until Henry, were born in Connecticut.

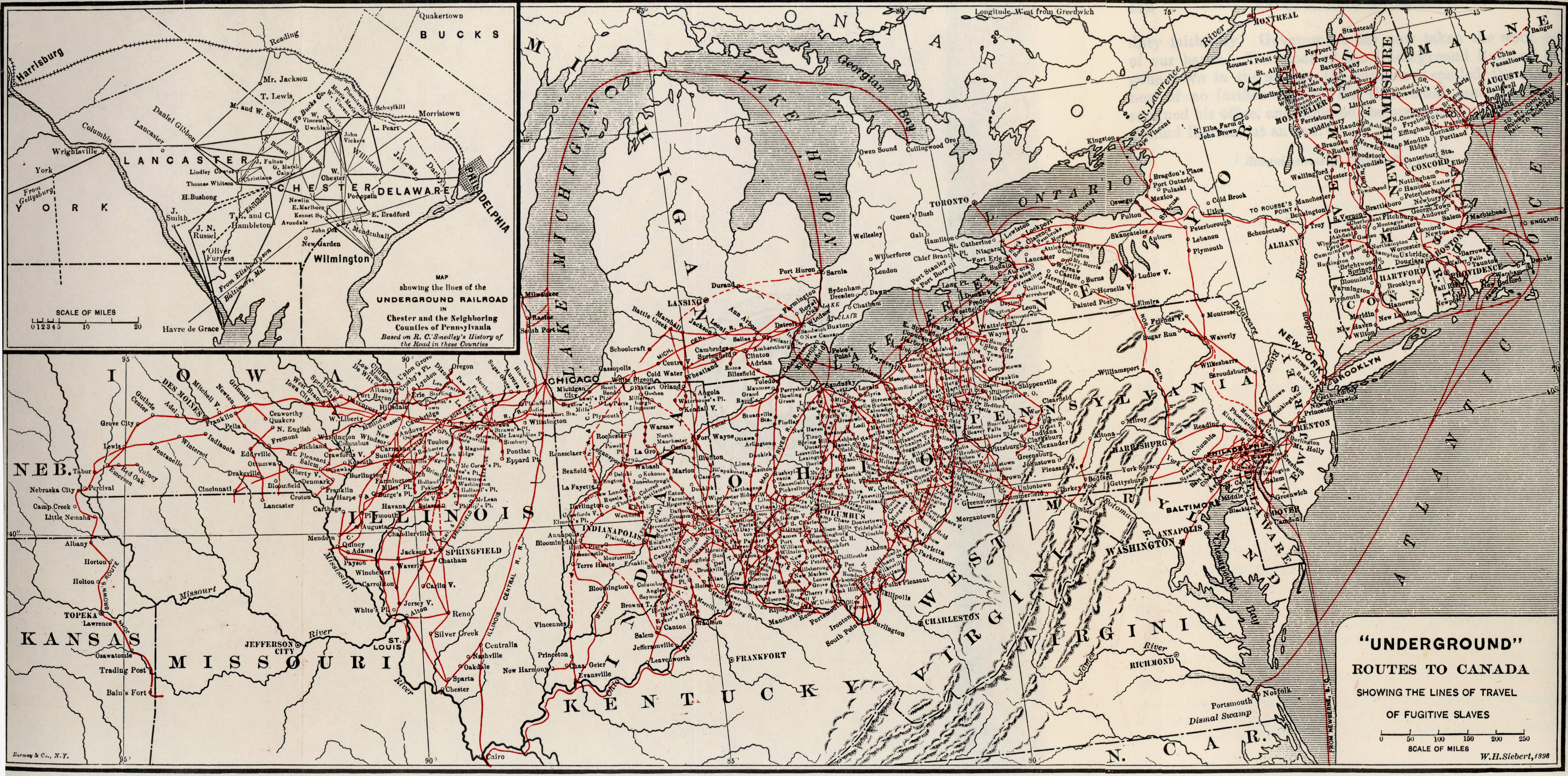
Routes of the Underground Railroad, through which Alanson Work helped manumit fugitive slaves

Henry grew up poor and had little formal education. When he was three, his father Alanson shifted the family near Quincy, Illinois, in hopes of finding better fortune. Alanson was an antislavery advocate who fashioned the family home into a station of the Underground Railroad, a network for fugitive slaves to escape to freedom. He helped thousands of slaves flee from bondage, and for this, the authorities sentenced him to twelve years' hard labor in Missouri in 1841. He received a conditional pardon four years later, whereby he had to return to Connecticut and forsake the Railroad. Having spent plenty of time with the freed slaves, the efforts of Henry's father left a stirring impression on him. He grew familiar with African-American dialect and minstrelsy and came to terms with slaves' routine agonies; such experiences sowed in him his father's staunch abolitionism that would later suffuse many of his songs.

While in Illinois, he irregularly attended Latin and Greek courses at Mission Institute. These bred his interest in philology. In music, Work was largely self-taught, save for some lessons at a church singing school and exposure to camp meetings in his neighborhood. He quickly grew acquainted with the laws of musical notation and conceived original melodies while laboring at the family pasture. For a time, he heartedly sang hymns during Mass but quit after being told his voice was not fit for singing.

Obliged by the terms of Alanson's release from prison, the Work family migrated back to Middletown in 1845, but Henry stayed a year longer. Aged fourteen, he reluctantly began his apprenticeship as a tailor at his parents' insistence. However, his father soon allowed him to pursue a career that better suited his tastes: printing, especially typesetting music. Typesetting granted Work further knowledge of the English language, which, according to the writer George Birdseye, would prove necessary for his future songwriting practice. He never abandoned his trade from then on. Outside work, writing and music occupied him most; he would pen poems, equip them with melodies, and contribute them to various newspapers in his spare time.

=== Early musical efforts (1853–1860) ===
In 1853, Work composed his first song with original lyrics and melody, "We Are Coming, Sister Mary". Instead of submitting it to the poetry section of a gazette, he sent it to Edwin P. Christy, founder of the New York minstrel troupe that had launched Stephen Foster's career. Christy was content and decided to perform it at his shows, where it met respectable praise. He later sold it to the local publishing firm Firth, Pond & Co. for $25; (Note: Roughly equating to $1,085 in August 2026) he bestowed them on Work. This sum, very generous in those days, thrust Work toward more ambitious songwriting efforts. He published a comic song, "Lilly-Wily Woken", under William Hall & Son two years later.

While his career in music had been moderately fruitful so far, Work started doubting his ability. He passed the rest of the decade without publishing any songs, choosing to focus solely on printing. For this reason, he migrated to Chicago in 1855, aged twenty-three, and took up a new printing job. He married Sarah Parker two years later and bought a cottage at Hyde Park. (Note: The date of Henry and Sarah's marriage is unclear. While Root's concise biography of the composer gives it at 1856, David S. Hill concludes that it certainly took place in 1857.) However, in March 1861, his enthusiasm for songwriting revived; Work published a song commemorating the steamer Lady Elgin's shipwreck, "Lost on the Lady Elgin", earning little success.

=== Civil War (1861–1865) ===
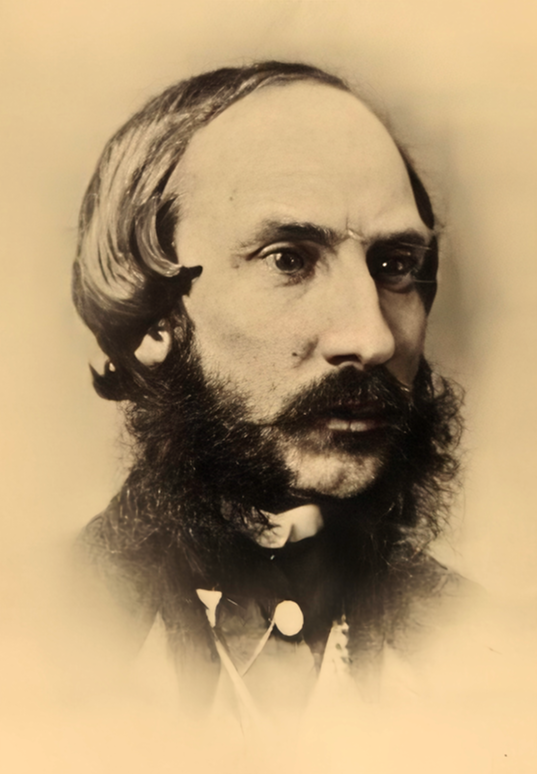
George F. Root of Root & Cady in 1860, with whom Work collaborated throughout the Civil War

The following month, the American Civil War broke out. After the bombardment of Fort Sumter on April 12 and 13, President Abraham Lincoln called for seventy-five thousand volunteers to suppress the Southern rebellion. Music "aroused herself to meet the exigencies of the times", as a contemporary newspaper declared, and raised the Union's spirits by rallying both black and white civilians round their nation's cause. The foremost site hosting music shifted from the theater to the home because families of soldiers needed an immediate, domestic medium to convey and understand their feelings sparked by war, hence the popularity of parlor music around this time. Being in such high demand, patriotic song submissions began pouring into local newspapers and music labels; approximately two thousand were published as sheet music in 1861 alone. But the Union lacked much antislavery vigor.

Having just been remotivated to write music, Work was drawn to Root & Cady, the preeminent Northern publishing firm of the time operated by the songwriter George F. Root. He partnered with the firm throughout the war and in subsequent years. From 1861 to 1865, he penned twenty-seven pieces and published them for Root & Cady. This period marked Work's songwriting efforts at their most fertile and palmy; Root & Cady's fortunes too crested during the war. His songs generally reflect the Union's progress and civilian wartime struggles. "Brave Boys Are They", a grim overview of army life, opened Work's wartime career, but it was not until March that his music started leaving an impression; conversely, the scholar Richard S. Hill indicates that "Brave Boys Are They" was a great success and pushed Work to "take his composing seriously" for the first time. That month, Root bought out another of his Unionist compositions, "Our Captain's Last Words". Root met him in person a short while after as Work presented the manuscript for a new song; his autobiography recounts the encounter:

One day early in the war a quiet and rather solemn-looking young man, poorly clad, was sent up to my room from the store with a song for me to examine. I looked at it and then at him in astonishment. It was 'Kingdom Coming'—elegant in manuscript, full of bright, good sense and comical situations in its "darkey" dialect—the words fitting the melody almost as aptly and neatly as Gilbert fits Sullivan—the melody decidedly good and taking, and the whole exactly suited to the times. 'Did you write these words and music?' I asked. A gentle 'Yes' was the answer. 'What is your business, if I may inquire?' 'I am a printer.' 'Would you rather write music than set type?' 'Yes.' 'Well, if this is a specimen of what you can do, I think you may give up the printing business.'

However, it was "Brave Boys Are They", which Work gave to Root after "Kingdom Coming", that secured his contract with Root & Cady. Root saw potential in Work's adeptness at composing and, during a time that demanded thoroughly pro-Union patriotic songs, assigned him a songwriting post lasting until the Civil War's end.

"Kingdom Coming"
First verse and chorus

Say, darkeys, hab you seen de massa,
Wid the muffstash (Note: In Standard English, translating to 'mustache') on his face,
Go long de road some time dis mornin',
Like he gwine to leab de place?
He seen a smoke, way up de ribber,
Whar de Linkum gumboats lay;
He took his hat, an' lef' berry sudden,
An' I spec (Note: In Standard English, translating to 'expect') he's run away!

De massa run? ha! ha!
De darkey stay? ho! ho!
It mus' be now de kingdom comin',
An' de year ob Jubilo!

"Kingdom Coming" sung by Frank Crumit in 1927.

The music historian David Ewen deems "Kingdom Coming" "the first of his important songs"; and it became a wartime favorite of black troops. A gutless, hypocritical slave owner escapes his plantation, then taken over by his slaves who lock their overseer up as retribution for his cruelty. It appealed to black Union soldiers who sang it regularly as they marched to the South. First advertised by Christy in April 1862, "Kingdom Coming" quickly became a linchpin of minstrel show repertoires. Root could not keep up with orders for the song, claiming it to be his firm's most profitable composition for almost one and a half years. Up until the nineteenth century's close, it was reportedly as popular as "Dixie". While Work generally supported President Lincoln's handling of the war, he spoofed the draft in his 1862 comic song "Grafted into the Army". It is narrated by a widowed mother whose son was drafted into the Union army under the law; her speech and linguistic slips hint at their social status. He conveyed fear about the Union's wartime progress against the Confederacy in "God Save the Nation" (1862/1863); Theodore Tilton wrote its words.

In 1863, Root began issuing a periodical, the Song Messenger, with Work as its editor. They agreed that Work would be "independent and untrammeled in the expression of his views on all subjects", but his conduct promptly sparked controversy. In a June article, he admonished compilers of church music books for altering traditional tunes and corrupting them, followed up by another in July declaring one of the changed hymns "hardly recognizable [and] mutilated". Many compilers saw these articles as defamatory and demanded an apology. While the periodical survived the dispute, Work's editing post did not; he was fired in August.

Three months earlier, he had published "Song of a Thousand Years" in response to the Confederate Gettysberg campaign. He issued a sequel of "Kingdom Coming" in July 1863 titled "Babylon is Fallen". Also written in vernacular, "Babylon is Fallen" aroused black men recruited for the Union army; their numbers had grown since the Emancipation Proclamation's passage. Another favorite among abolitionists and soldiers, it sold more first-month copies than its prequel. In 1864, Work published "Wake Nicodemus", a minstrel show hit, and "Corporal Schnapps", a tragic yet humorous lament noted for its employment of German dialect; the Chicago Tribune said upon the latter's release that it enables "the difficult feat of laughing and crying at the same time".

"Marching Through Georgia"
First verse and chorus

Bring the good old bugle boys! we'll sing another song,
Sing it with a spirit that will start the world along;
Sing it as we used to sing it fifty thousand strong,
While we were marching through Georgia.

"Hurrah! Hurrah! we bring the Jubilee!
Hurrah! Hurrah! the flag that makes you free!"
So we sang the chorus from Atlanta to the sea,
While we were marching through Georgia.

Besides the Union struggle, Work devoted himself to the temperance movement and wrote several songs sounding the dangers of drink. The movement picked up pace after the Civil War's close as several fraternities such as the Women's Christian Temperance Union and Prohibition Party sprouted, campaigning for abstinence or laws against alcohol consumption and sale. Published around this time in 1864, Work's "Come Home, Father" is a young girl's plea for her father, then trifling away his time in a bar getting drunk, to return home while her brother is slowly dying. It was one of the best-known temperance songs of the time. In an 1879 profile of the composer, George Birdseye considered it "the pioneer and pattern for all the many temperance pieces now in the market, not a few of which are very palpable imitations". Work wrote other temperance songs after the war, including "Lillie of the Snow-Storm" (1866) and "King Bibler's Army" (1877), although "Come Home, Father" remained the most famous.

"Marching Through Georgia" sung by Harlan & Stanley in 1904

Of all Work's Civil War compositions, none were as fruitful or sold as well as "Marching Through Georgia". The end of 1864 saw the March to the Sea, in which Union forces crippled Confederate resources in Georgia and took over the coastal city of Savannah; Work celebrated the campaign with "Marching Through Georgia", published in January 1865. Regarded as an icon of the Civil War, it sold five-hundred thousand copies in its first twelve years. "Marching Through Georgia" proved one of the few wartime compositions to outlast the conflict, no less outstanding a feat considering that civilians had grown weary of war. The writer Edwin Tribble opines that the song singlehandedly sustained Work's fame after the war—the little he had.

In February 1865, Work set P. G. T. Beauregard's evacuation of Charleston, South Carolina, to music; the result, "Ring the Bell, Watchman", reflected the successive toppling of Confederate cities during the war's final weeks. Robert E. Lee's surrender at Appomattox Court House on April 9 marked the Civil War's end; Work published one final war hymn in June, "'Tis Finished!, or Sing Hallelujah", that thankfully celebrates the end of fighting and calls upon listeners to "sing the vict'ry won".

=== Postbellum (1865–1871) ===
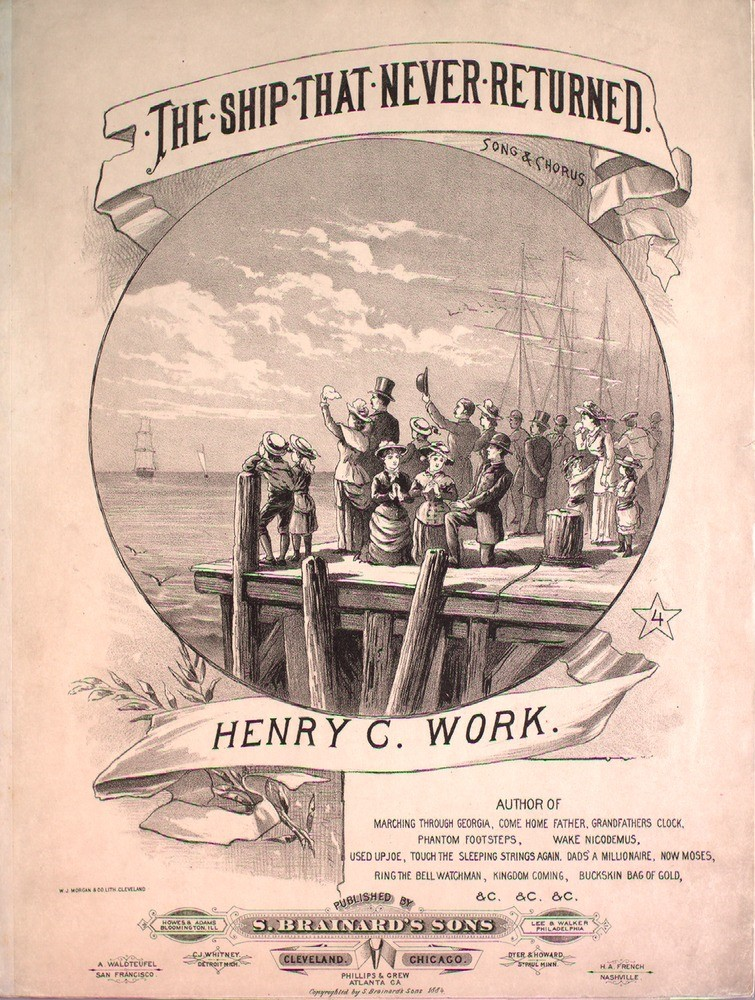
Sheet music cover of "The Ship That Never Returned"

With the Civil War over, Work's motivation for songwriting and musical output declined considerably. Turning away from patriotic songs which, as Root writes, became outdated, he settled into sentimental balladry. The scholars Dale Cockrell and Andrew M. Zinck observe that American popular music matured in the fifteen years following the Civil War; songs, often written to be performed at home, were generally "stylized" and cemented the values of the middle class.

Melancholy hardly features in Work's wartime music, but "Little Major" (1863) suggested a turn toward sentimentality. His postbellum songs focus on somber themes owing to the personal tragedies engulfing his later life, as Dean Nelson notes in a 2008 Connecticut Explored article: "... in his lyrics, children die, soldiers die, ships sink, love goes unreturned, poor folks starve, and the lonely remain so." Newly enriched by his war efforts, Work embarked on a tour around Europe in 1865, during which he wrote the first of his postbellum songs, "The Ship That Never Returned". It narrates the departure of a ship from a harbor that never come back, with a mother and the captain's wife lamenting the loss of their loved ones on board. The song became a folk standard, and parodies started burgeoning as late as the 1880s; one of the most significant songs to borrow its melody or theme is "The Wreck of the Old 97".

Upon returning to the United States, Work and his brother invested most of their wealth in hundreds of acres of land in Vineland, New Jersey, to establish a profitable fruit farm. Their expectations promptly crumbled as the farm failed, bankrupting them both. This was the first of several personal tragedies to befall him. His everyday life shaken—although he himself not especially disturbed—Work left Vineland and vanished from the public eye. In 1868, he moved to Philadelphia, Pennsylvania, living in seclusion since his wife had become insane for reasons unspecified; still, the family seemed to blame him. (Note: In an 1871 letter to his intimate correspondent Susie Mitchell, Work writes: "Whatever the ground of complaint may be, it has in some way grown out of Sarah's derangement; for it did not exist during the nine years succeeding our marriage [from 1857 to 1866], while she was sane. There appears to be a sort of general and indefinite blame cast on me, but exactly how it was incurred, and what ought to have been done, no one has frankness enough to say.") He was cut off from his children, who were residing with Sarah in Greenwich Village, Manhattan. Two years later, meanwhile having passed some time in California, he resettled in Brooklyn and spent the next twelve years isolated in a boarding house. A letter composed in the early 1870s to his correspondent Susie Mitchell paints a grim picture of the depression consuming his postbellum life, worsened by the loss of his son Waldo in 1871: "My nerves seem to be gradually gaining an ascendancy over me—the fastenings which connect the mind and body seem to be growing loose and getting detached."

In the postwar years until 1872, Work penned seventeen songs, (Note: "Traveling Homeward", composed in 1872, is cataloged by Hill but Work did not recognize it. If incorporated in his list of songs, this would tally the postbellum compositions from 1865 to 1872 up to eighteen.) fewer than the twenty-seven authored during the Civil War. Others include "Andy Veto" (1866), a satire of then-President Andrew Johnson's vetoing of Reconstruction legislation, and "Crossing the Grand Sierras" (1870), describing a train voyage across the nation set just after the Transcontinental Railroad's completion. The latter was Work's last song published for Root & Cady—personal differences between him and Root as well as the business' abrupt closure brought their partnership to an end.

=== Decline and brief revival (1871–1876) ===
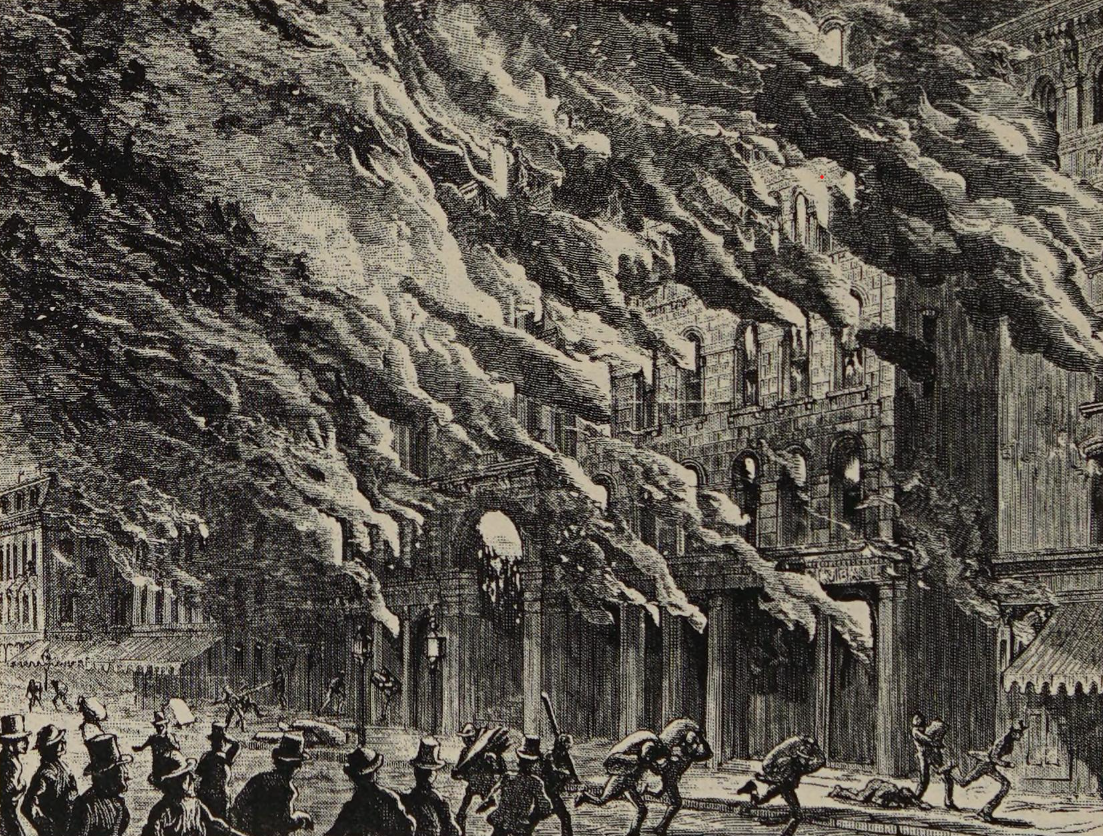
Destruction of Root & Cady's music store in the first floor of Crosby's Opera House during the Great Chicago Fire of 1871

In the fall of 1871, Root & Cady's firm burnt down in the Great Chicago Fire. It raged on from October 8 till October 10, destroying all waterworks, banking houses, and railway depots, and caused a small depression in the national stock market. All of Work's original music plates fell victim to the conflagration. Unable to continue the business, Root & Cady's music copyrights were sold to the Ohioan publishers S. Brainard Sons and John Church & Co. The firm filed for bankruptcy in 1872. Root continued his former teaching profession, and Chauncey M. Cady left Chicago for New York City. This withered any possibility of Work returning to songwriting soon; from 1873 until 1876, he published no music. His life became mangled by boredom and depression; in an 1875 letter, he wrote: "I am no longer a printer—am now a proof-reader. Nothing to do all day, but to read and criticize, find fault or mark errors ... ." Only printing, the career he held since his youth, and attendance at local church services absorbed him.

"Grandfather's Clock"
First verse and chorus

My grandfather's clock was too large for the shelf,
So it stood ninety years on the floor;
It was taller by half than the old man himself,
Though it weighed not a pennyweight more.
It was bought on the morn of the day that he was born,
And was always his treasure and pride;
But it stopped short never to go again
When the old man died.

Ninety years without slumbering (tick, tick, tick, tick)
His life seconds numbering (tick, tick, tick, tick)
It stopped short never to go again
When the old man died.

After Root & Cady shut down, Cady too sought to revive his fortunes as a music publisher. He established a business in New York, in 1875, lasting five years until shutting it down owing to fatigue from old age. In 1876, Cady chanced to encounter Work while strolling in Broadway and, sensing a lucrative opportunity, offered him a post at his business. Eager to pick up songwriting once again, Work accepted; he published nine songs for Cady from 1876 to 1879, ending his retirement. Throughout this time, he also wrote for John Church & Co., William A. Pond & Co., and Root's firm.

"Grandfather's Clock" performed by the Edison Quartet in 1905

Work's most profitable and last hit was "Grandfather's Clock", issued by Cady in January 1876 and made popular by the entertainer Sam Lucas in New Haven, Connecticut. Inspired by his sympathetic attitude toward disaffected individuals, he anthropomorphizes a clock to signify its owner; it had stood for ninety years throughout the old man's life and accompanied him. The song secured anywhere from eight-hundred thousand to a million sheet music sales. After Work sold the copyright to "Grandfather's Clock", Cady paid him a $4,000 royalty, (Note: Roughly equating to $125,000 in August 2026) helping to lift him out of poverty but not enough to sustain him during lulls in his songwriting output. (Note: Cady paid Work $250 in monthly royalties for "Grandfather's Clock", amounting to $4,000 by 1879. However, an 1884 issue of the Evening Capital claims that Work earned $300 a month, as opposed to $250.) According to The Garland Encyclopedia of World Music, it was "perhaps" the most popular American song of the 1870s, and in his 1879 biography, George Birdseye declared it "without doubt the most popular song in this country". (Note: It also coined the phrase grandfather clock to describe a longcase clock.) The author Philip Furia suggests it was the first song to become famous through a national marketing campaign.

=== Long murmur and end (1877–1884) ===
None of Work's compositions after "Grandfather's Clock" reproduced its success. An unhappy marriage and family life drove him further into despair, as the health problems of his wife, who was in a mental asylum, overcast his final years. He tried his hand at a long-distance relationship with Pennsylvanian Susie Mitchell but eventually called it off after a decade of corresponding with her. Work's passion for songwriting also took another hit; following its revival in early 1876, he would only issue two compositions before another hiatus in 1879. Some songs of this period are the "California Bird Song" (1878) (Note: Also known as "Pity Me, Loo!") and "Mac O' Macorkity" (1877).

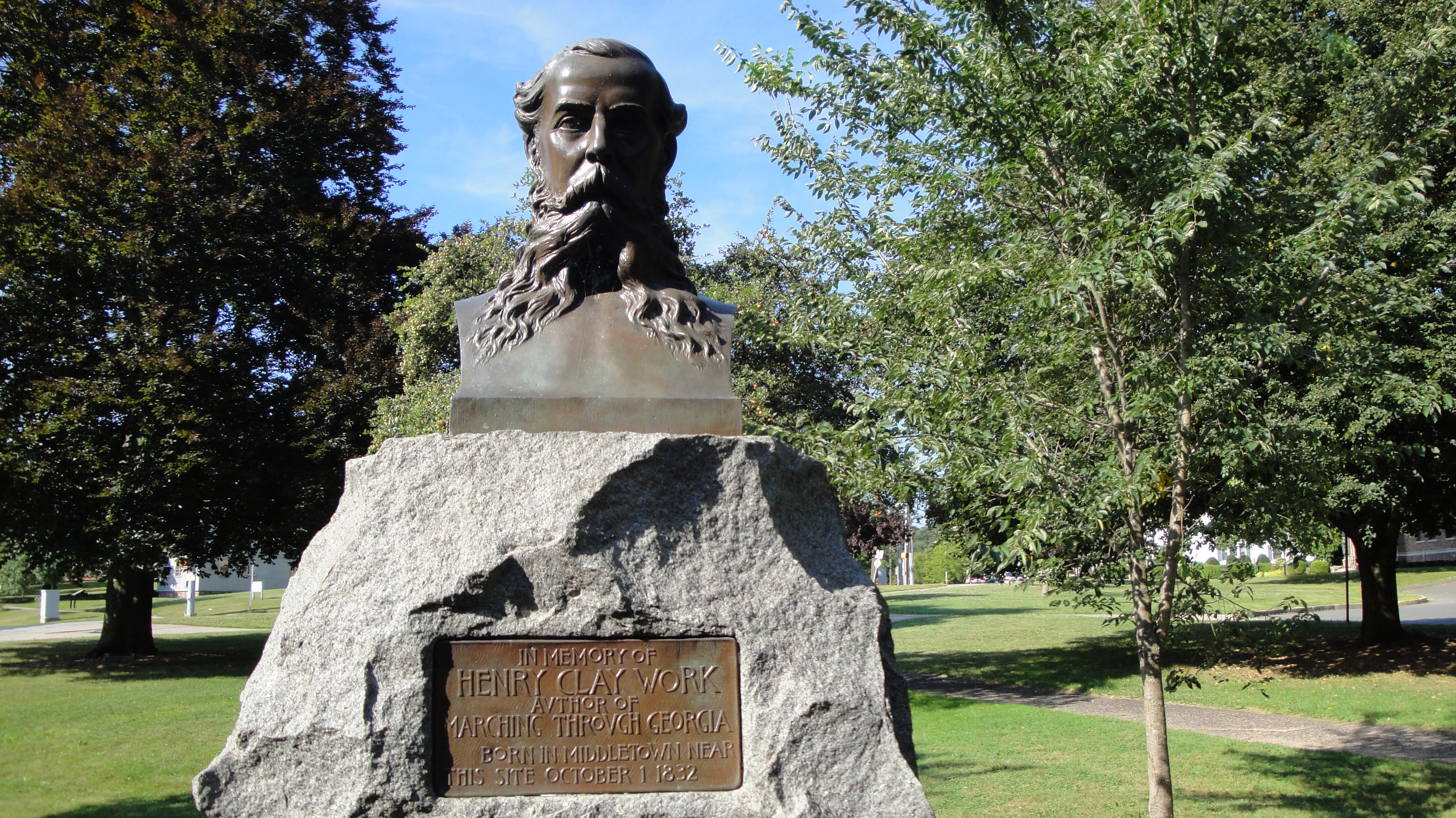
A bust of Work near his birthplace in Middletown, Connecticut

In 1882, Work left Brooklyn for the more serene Bath in upstate New York, longing for an abode where he "could find a still nook in this still noisy world ... engage in literary and musical work, and at the same time find repose for over-strung nerves". A letter written after his move to Bath recalls that he had seized the attention of numerous citizens; he credits this to the success of "Marching Through Georgia". That year, he briefly picked up composition again, writing roughly ten songs until 1883 such as "The Lost Letter" and "The Prayer on the Pier", but by then he could only hope to approach the fame he once had. Hill writes that Work began struggling to publish some of his songs, a misfortune that had never struck him before.

He died abruptly of heart disease on June 8, 1884, while visiting his mother's residence at Chestnut Street, Hartford, Connecticut. He was survived by one of his four children, Nellie. As writes Hill, obituaries brushed off his legacy. He is buried in Spring Grove Cemetery in Hartford. A monument in his honor was erected in the same cemetery twenty-five years after his death.

== Music ==
=== Style and genres ===
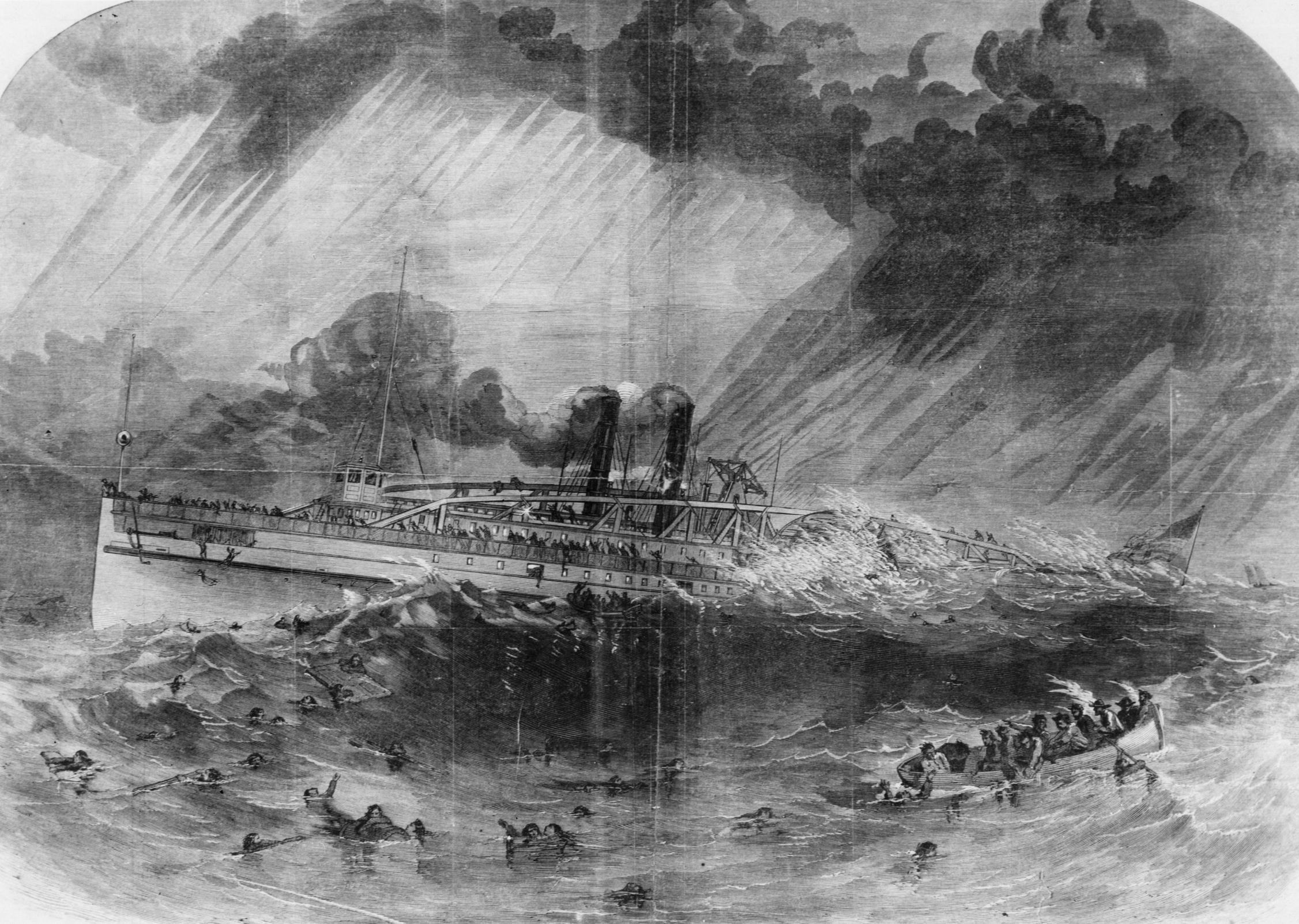
The sinking of the Lady Elgin in 1860, for which Work penned one of his numerous sentimental ballads

In his 1891 autobiography, Root stressed Work's poetic talent and mastery of melody. Another writer remarked:

His melodies are simple and natural, but as unlike and varies as the emotions to which they give expression; but, whether grave or comic, they possess inspirational qualities that, as musical compositions, arouse the imagination and fasten themselves upon the memory of the hearer. In his songs, Mr. Work is distinguished by his use of plain Anglo-Saxon words. He discards frothy adjectives, all rant, all extravagance of language, and, like Dickens, relies upon the situation he creates. This is his source of power over the human heart.

According to Song of America, Work's catalog features "love songs and moralistic, tragic, and humorous pieces of music". The musicologist Jon W. Finson writes that many of his songs teem with "a pronounced moralistic zeal", which he thinks descends from his childhood, and the writers John Tasker Howard and George Kent Bellows underline the "fiery partisanship" of his wartime pieces. The latter have been noted for communicating the feelings of Union civilians—to a greater extent than any other songwriter did, according to The New Grove Dictionary of Music and Musicians. David Nelson writes: "Work, a deeply religious man, sought solace and [consolation] for himself and society through his songs. Victorian America embraced such sentimental conceits." David Cockrell and Andrew Zinck describe Work as a "master" of parlor music, writing of his parlor song "Grandfather's Clock": "It affirmed social values such as family, home, religion, and more abstract notions like the work ethic and materialism."

Ewen writes that Work was "a gifted writer of comedy or novelty songs in which he usually had a chorus interject amusing or illustrative comments", naming the "Meyow!" opening the chorus of "Poor Kitty Popcorn" was an example. The New Grove Dictionary notes that Work was a prodigious writer of tragic compositions.

==== Minstrel songs ====
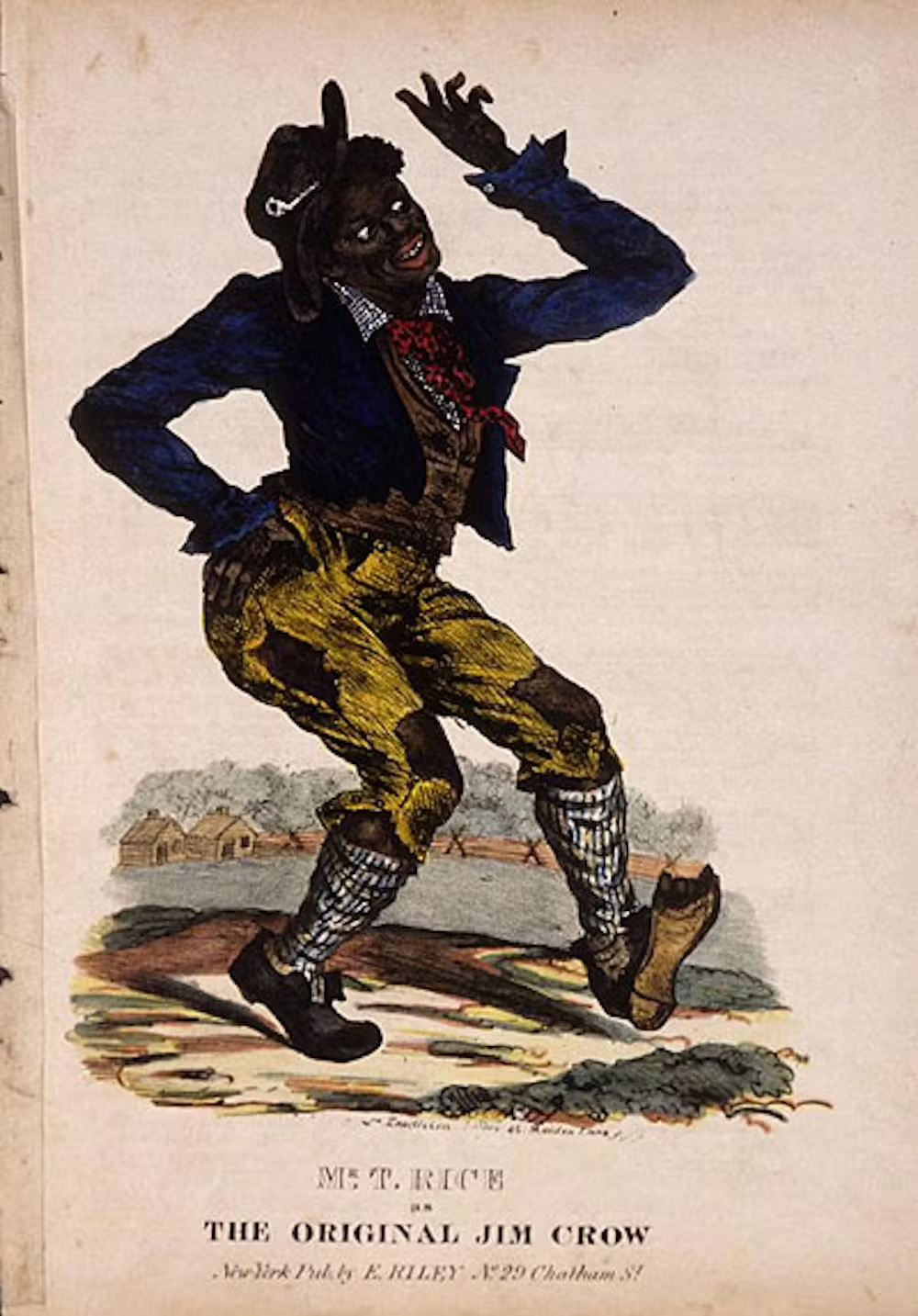
Thomas D. Rice as Jim Crow, a leading stereotypical portrayal of black people in nineteenth-century minstrel shows

Many of Work's songs present slaves' routine undertakings on the plantation and incorporate African-American dialect, thus falling in the minstrelsy genre. In Florine Thayer McCray's words, they evoke "the very atmosphere of awakening plantation life" and echo "the cottonpicker's musing hum and the roustabout's refrain". The minstrel show generally displayed the black person as "ludicrous, stupid, tasteless, ugly, sexually adventorous, a dancer of wild abandon" and, at least in its early days, borrowed no influence from African-American music. Intended as social commentary, these unsophisticated, false images catered to northern audiences' tastes; an early Stephen Foster song, "Massa's in de Cold Ground" (1852), narrates the sorrow felt by a helpless group of slaves after the death of their gracious master.

On the other hand, Work exposes black people's actual struggles rather than belittling or exalting them as most antebellum musicians had done. Having come face to face with their hardships while in the Underground Railroad, Work understood the plight of slaves. He resorted to minstrelsy not for entertainment but to endorse emancipation and black enlistment. "Kingdom Coming" strays from the mockery of blackface minstrelsy, portraying a realistic picture of plantation life and humanizing slaves rather than presenting them as blithe, docile servants. Instead of the oppressive master reigning supreme over his subjects as generally observed in minstrel songs, these roles are inverted; the slaves take over the plantation and overcome their overseer. The song's allure was bolstered by its employment of African-American dialect.

=== Method ===
Root said of Work's style of composition: "Mr. Work was a slow, painstaking writer, being from one to three weeks upon a song; but when the work was done it was like a piece of fine mosaic, especially in the fitting of words to music." His method involved devising the melody and lyrics simultaneously in his head and, after much thought, putting them to paper. Sometimes, he would deliberate for a short while; at other times, he would anxiously pass days on end without concocting a suitable idea. The finished manuscript would then be published before he would have even heard what he had composed. In his youth, he habitually jotted down lyrics on small cards while going about his routine and then adapted them to piano melodies. Fixated on originality, Work crafted the tune for all his compositions and wrote the lyrics of all but four. He refused requests to put others' words to music. (Note: According to Hill, the four songs with borrowed lyrics are "Little Hallie" (1861), written by J. L. Peters, "God Save the Nation" (1862), by Theodore Tilton, "Agnes by the River" (1868), by Mary J. McDermit, and "Traveling Homeward" (1872) by Cadet Otis. Additionally, the words to "Watching for Pa" (1863) and "The Picture on the Wall" (1864) were "adapted" by Work.)

== Personal life ==
=== Character ===
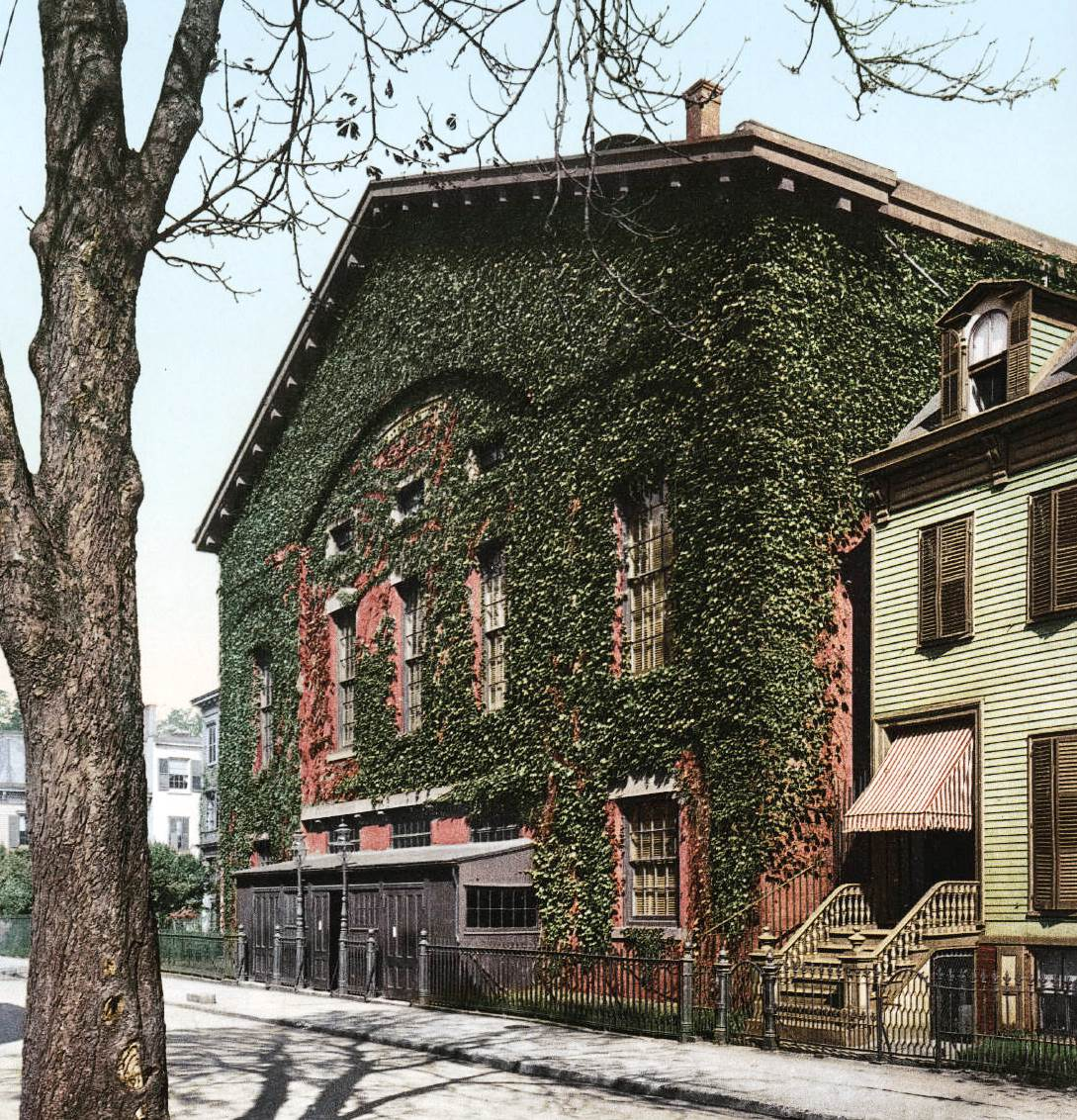
Plymouth Church in Brooklyn, which Work routinely attended while residing there

One of Work's obituaries summed up his persona as an "invalid-like fellow with sadness in his voice and bearing poverty in his dress". Reportedly handsome, he stood at about five feet ten inches, having brown hair, full whiskers, and bluish-grey eyes. He was quiet and unassuming, to the extent that his nephew said he refused to expose those who plagiarized his music. Work made few intimate friends. Practicing what his temperance songs preached, he was a committed teetotaler and Prohibition activist and even called for tobacco to be outlawed.

Work was a Christian disciple and regularly attended Mass. While residing in Brooklyn, he frequented services at Henry Ward Beecher's Plymouth Church; an 1871 letter mentions his devotion to it: "One radical struck deep into the ground where Plymouth Church stands, and for months that was all that held me." That year, he composed a brief oratorio dedicated to his congregation, Joy in Heaven!, or The Returning Wanderer's Welcome.

=== Family and relationships ===
In 1857, Work married the Bay Stater Sarah Parker. He had four children with her: Waldo Franklin (1857–1871), Willie Lovejoy (1861–1862), Ellen "Nellie" Louisa (1863–1895), and Clara Etta (1878). The Works spent a few years in Chicago and Hubbardston, Massachusetts before permanently moving to Greenwich Village sometime before 1865. After his wife spiraled into degeneracy, Work lived apart from his family. They chided him, without sound grounds, for Sarah's mental instability as well as Waldo's sudden death. The only saving grace of such a tumultuous family life was his daughter Nellie, his only child to outlive him; he was exceedingly fond of Nellie and depended on her for solace in his final years. Having to endure a distressing marriage, and ruling out divorce, Work hungered for a romantic relationship.

In 1868, while searching for a home in Philadelphia, he came across one owned by the Mitchell family in the Ledger Residences. While greeting the family, he became enchanted by the eighteen-year-old Susie and soon fell in love with her. Assuming she reciprocated his affection but also desperate for a gratifying relationship, Work established a correspondence with her, writing forty lengthy letters from 1869 to 1883 that "concealed his feelings in the formal style of the day". The vast majority were written in his early New York years, from 1870 to 1874. While Susie invited him over several times during this period such as for Christmas, she did not share his enthusiasm. Work even dedicated a song to her, "No Letters From Home" (1871), a plea for more letters from the Mitchell family to remedy the loneliness eclipsing him. Being nearly double her age, he knew this relationship stood no chance at being fulfilled; in fact, she got married in 1877. Upon hearing of Susie's intentions to wed, Work thought it best to close off the correspondence and thereafter only wrote terse, stilted notes on occasion. One of his final long letters reads:

There is certainly a mysterious chord connecting us, and, having lasted so long, it will probably never be entirely severed. ... Of all motives that serve as main-springs for human action, the love of a woman has ever been with me the strongest—by far the strongest. Under such influence, but rarely otherwise, I can do my best! Oh! how differently I might have been situated to-day, had such an influence, like a beacon light, shone strongly and steadily on all the years of my manhood!

=== Chicago ===
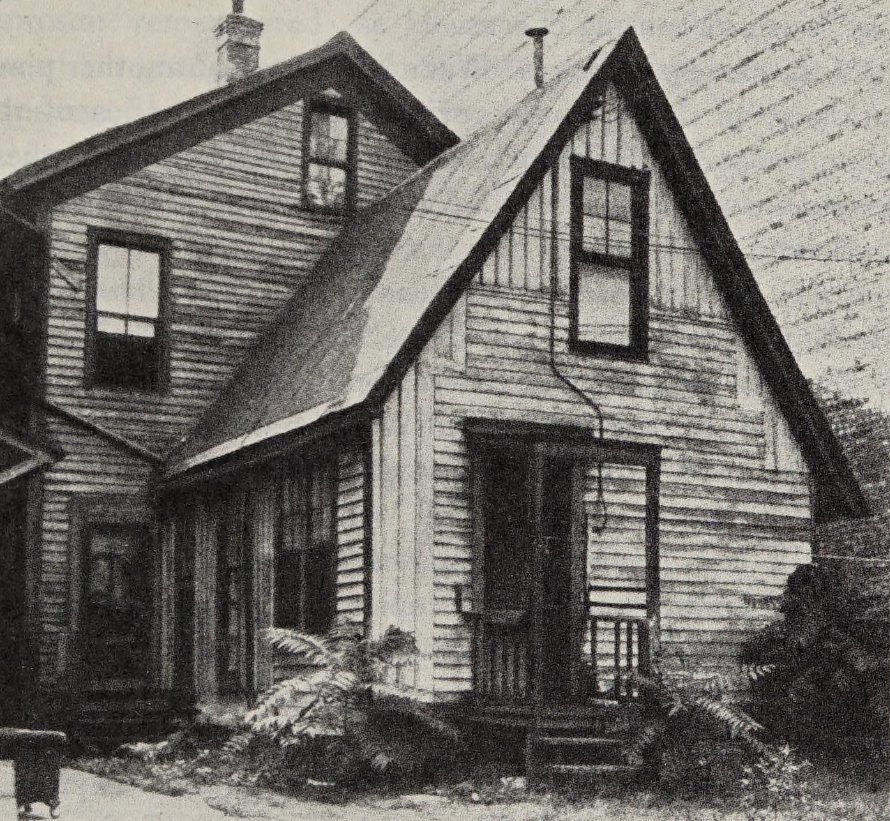
Work's cottage at Hyde Park

Work migrated to Chicago in 1855 to further his trade as a printer. In 1859, after Paul Cornell established the new community of Hyde Park in the city's southern part, Work purchased a plot of land from him for $175. (Note: Roughly equating to $7,040 in August 2026) Roughly a year later, he oversaw the construction of his home at 5317 Dorchester Avenue, a small, humble cottage "hardly [looking] big enough to house a piano", in the writer John Drury's view. He and his wife Sarah devoted themselves to the Chicagoan community and were among the first organizers of the First Presbyterian Church. Work also served as township clerk from 1864 to 1866. In 1867, he sold the cottage and land and took up a new residence in Philadelphia, later moving to New York City.

=== Pastimes and singing ===
Work delighted himself in mechanical studies and experiments, and he filled pauses in his musical career almost wholly by devising mechanical inventions. He invented and patented a knitting machine, a walking doll, and a rotary engine. In 1868, he wrote a once popular seriocomic poem, The Upshot Family. Work often designed the title pages of his songs.

While a committed songwriter, he once told a reporter: "The man who writes songs doesn't generally feel like singing them." However, he made an exception at an annual Grand Army of the Republic encampment in 1883, where he casually sang "Marching Through Georgia" to satisfy the crowd: "I do not sing the Solo well; but I have usually a magnificent chorus, and the auditors seem greatly pleased ... [I made] it understood that I do not claim to be a singer, but comply with these requests rather than to appear disobliging." From that day on, he felt "compelled to repeat it at almost every social gathering I have attended".

== Legacy ==
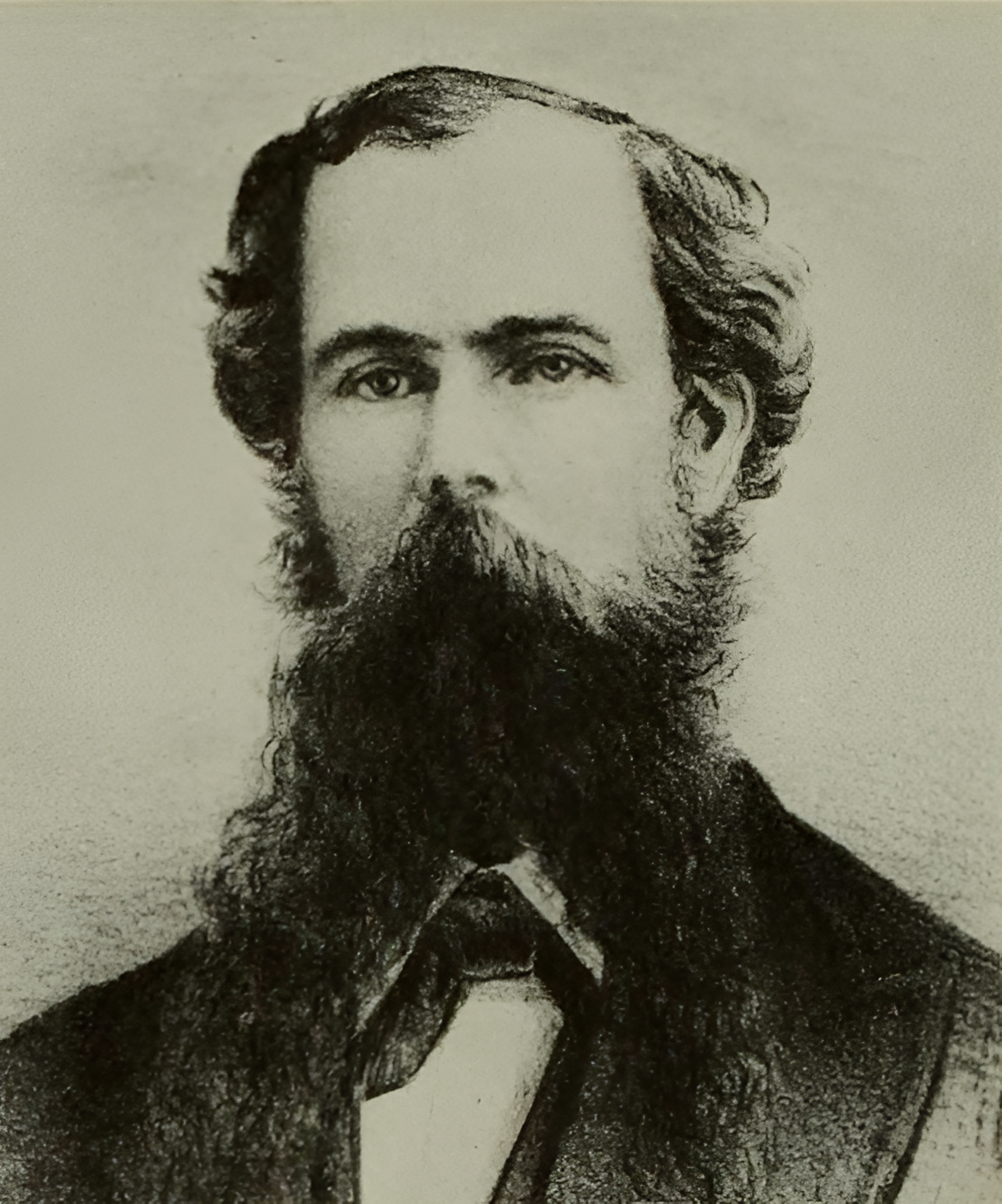
An illustration of Work, seen in David Ewen's Popular American Composers (1962)

Work is one of the most celebrated American popular music songwriters of the Civil War and Reconstruction eras. Along with Root, he was the most popular and celebrated songwriter of the Union. According to Hill, he published over seventy pieces of music. A committed believer in societal causes, many of his songs were part and parcel of antislavery and temperance gatherings. In Finson's opinion, Work was "[the] master of the temperance song" and "the ultimate composer of quintessentially realistic popular song during the sixties and seventies". He is, however, best remembered for his patriotic compositions hallowing the Union in the Civil War. Only few traces of Work's life and work exist in the body of music scholarship; writing in 2004, Bruce Kelley and Mark Snell note that two studies conducted by Richard Hill in 1953 were still the "most complete source of biographical information" on Work, and Nonesuch's album Who Shall Rule This American Nation? (1975) remained the sole major attempt to set down much of his music on record.

A Hartford monument dedicated to the composer by the Connecticut governor Frank B. Weeks reads: "Work rendered a service that would entitle him to be called the chief singer of the Civil War ... whose life work did so much to keep burning brightly the flame of patriotism during the four dark years when the fate of this nation trembled in the balance." An 1884 obituary says of Work's legacy: "Some few of his productions have not only been on the lips of nearly every man, woman and child in America, but have been known and sung, with some variations, in every part of the world. ... His compositions were of the popular order and touched the popular heart."

He was additionally one of the developers of the verse-chorus structure of late-nineteenth-century popular music. The music historian Kent A. Bowman argues that minstrel pieces written in dialect, his included, influenced ragtime and jazz. In 1970, Work was inducted into the Songwriters Hall of Fame.

== See also ==
- Music of the American Civil War
- Timeline of music in the United States (1850–1879)
- Temperance songs
- George F. Root

== Bibliography ==
=== Books ===
==== Primary sources ====
- Root, George F. (1891). The Story of a Musical Life: An Autobiography by Geo F. Root. Cincinnati, OH: The John Church Co. ISBN 978-1-4047-8329-4.
- Root, George F.; Sawyer, Charles C.; Work, Henry C., eds. (1892). Our National War Songs (2nd ed.). Chicago, IL: The S. Brainard's Sons Co.
- Work, Henry C. (n.d.). Work, Bertram G. (ed.). Songs of Henry Clay Work. New York City, NY: Little & Ives.

==== Secondary sources ====
- Andreas, Alfred T. (1884). History of Cook County Illinois: From the Earliest Period to the Present Time. Chicago, IL: A.T. Andreas.
- Bailey, Guy; Maynor, Natalie; Cukor-Avila, Patricia (1991). The Emergence of Black English: Text and Commentary. Philadelphia, PA: John Benjamins Publishing Company. ISBN 1-55619-161-8.
- Bowman, Kent A. (1987). Voices of Combat: A Century of Liberty and War Songs, 1765–1865. Westport, CT: Greenwood Press, Inc. ISBN 0-313-25408-7.
- Carder, P. H. (2008). George F. Root, Civil War Songwriter: A Biography. Jefferson, NC: McFarland & Company, Inc. ISBN 978-0-7864-3374-2.
- Cockrell, Dale; Zinck, Andrew M. (2001). "Popular Music of the Parlor and Stage". In Koskoff, Ellen (ed.). The Garland Encyclopedia of World Music Volume 3: The United States and Canada. Vol. 3. New York City, NY: Garland Publishing, Inc. pp. 179–201.
- Cohen, Michael C. (2015). The Social Lives of Poems in Nineteenth-Century America. Philadelphia, PA: The University of Pennsylvania Press. ISBN 978-0-8122-4708-4.
- Cohen, Norm (2000). Long Steel Rail: The Railroad in American Folksong (2nd ed.). Chicago, IL: University of Illinois Press. ISBN 0-252-06881-5.
- Drury, John (1975). Old Chicago Houses. Chicago, IL: University of Chicago Press. ISBN 0-226-16555-8.
- Ewen, David (1977). All the Years of American Popular Music. Englewood Cliffs, NJ: Prentice-Hall, Inc. ISBN 978-0-13-022442-2.
- Ewen, David (1962). Popular American Composers from Revolutionary Times to the Present: A Biographical and Critical Guide. New York City, NY: H. W. Wilson Company, Inc. ISBN 978-0824200404.
- Ewing, George W. (1977). The Well-Tempered Lyre: Songs and Verse of the Temperance Movements. Dallas, TX: Southern Methodist University Press. ISBN 0-870-740-008.
- Finson, Jon W. (1994). The Voices That Are Gone: Themes in Nineteenth-Century American Popular Song. New York City, NY: Oxford University Press. ISBN 0-19-505750-3.
- Floyd, Samuel A. (1995). The Power of Black Music: Interpreting Its History from Africa to the United States. New York City, NY: Oxford University Press. ISBN 0-19-508235-4.
- Furia, Philip (2016). The American Song Book: The Tin Pan Alley Era. New York City, NY: Oxford University Press. ISBN 978-0-19-939187-5.
- Howard, John T. (1946). Our American Music: Three Hundred Years of It (3rd ed.). New York City, NY: Thomas Y. Crowell Company. OCLC 423103.
- Howard, John Tasker; Bellows, George Kent (1967). A Short History of Music in America. New York City, NY: McFarland & Company, Inc. ISBN 0-8152-0162-1.
- Hursh, David; Goertzen, Chris (2009). Good Medicine and Good Music: A Biography of Mrs. Joe Person, Patent Remedy Entrepreneur and Musician, Including the Complete Text of Her 1903 Autobiography. Jefferson, NC: McFarland & Company, Inc. ISBN 978-0-7864-3459-6.
- Kelley, Bruce C.; Snell, Mark A. (2004). Bugle Resounding: Music and Musicians of the Civil War Era. Columbia, MO: University of Missouri Press. ISBN 0-8262-1538-6.
- McWhirter, Christian (2012). Battle Hymns: The Power and Popularity of Music in the Civil War. Chapel Hill, NC: University of North Carolina Press. ISBN 978-0-8078-3550-0.
- Merriam-Webster's Collegiate Dictionary (10th ed.). Springfield, MA: Merriam-Webster, Inc. 2000. ISBN 0-87779-708-0.
- Silber, Irwin (1995). Songs of the Civil War. Mineola, NY: Dover Publications. ISBN 0-486-28438-7.
- Spaeth, Sigmund (1948). A History of Popular Music in America. New York City, NY: Random House.
- Sadie, Stanley; Tyrrell, John, eds. (2001). The New Grove Dictionary of Music and Musicians. Vol. 27 (2nd ed.). New York City, NY: Macmillan Publishers. ISBN 1-56159-239-0.

=== Studies and journals ===
- Birdseye, George (1879). "America's Song Composers: II. George F. Root". Potter's American Monthly. 12 (86): 145–148 – via the Internet Archive.
- Birdseye, George (1879). "America's Song Composers: IV. Henry Clay Work". Potter's American Monthly. 12 (88): 284–288 – via the Internet Archive.
- Epstein, Dena J. (1944). "Music Publishing in Chicago before 1871: The Firm of Root & Cady, 1858–1871". Notes. 1 (4): 43–59. doi:10.2307/891291. JSTOR 891291.
- Epstein, Dena J. (1945). "Music Publishing in Chicago before 1871: Chapter VI, the End of the Firm, 1868–1871". Notes. 3 (1): 80–98, 101–109. doi:10.2307/891291. JSTOR 891291.
- Hill, Richard S. (1953). "The Mysterious Chord of Henry Clay Work". Notes. 10 (2): 211–225. doi:10.2307/892874. JSTOR 892874.
- Hill, Richard S. (1953). "The Mysterious Chord of Henry Clay Work (Conclusion)". Notes. 10 (3): 367–390. doi:10.2307/892162. JSTOR 892162.
- Sanders, Paul D. (2017). "Temperance Songs in American School Songbooks, 1865–1899". Journal of Historical Research in Music Education. 38 (2): 178–208. doi:10.1177/1536600616667602. JSTOR 26376931.
- Sussman, Rachel (2001). "The Carnavalizing of Race". Etnofoor. 14 (2): 79–88. JSTOR 41396391.
- Tribble, Edwin (1967). "Marching Through Georgia". The Georgia Review. 21 (4): 423–429. JSTOR 41396391.

=== Newspaper articles ===
- McCray, Florine Thayer (January 19, 1898). "About Henry Clay Work". New Haven Morning Journal and Courier. p. 10.
- "Dies Iræ!: Another Fearful Fire at Chicago". Nashville Union and American. October 10, 1871. p. 1.
- "Hawk-Eyetems". The Willimantic Journal. February 28, 1879. p. 7.
- "Henry C. Work: A Popular Song Writer, and His Method of Composing". Evening Star. May 28, 1881. p. 3.
- "Henry Clay Work: The Famous Song Writer Ends His Life in Hartford". New Haven Morning Journal and Courier. June 10, 1884. p. 2.
- "Herald Notes". The Morning Herald. November 4, 1878. p. 3.
- "My Grandfather's Clock: A Song that was Suddenly Made Popular—Henry C. Work's Melodies". San Marcos Free Press. January 25, 1879. p. 3.
- "[Page 2]". Evening Capital. July 18, 1884. p. 2.
- "Songs for the Million". The Saturday Evening Post. April 12, 1862. p. 4.
- "The Author of "Grandfather's Clock"". The Farmer and Mechanic. Vol. 3, no. 7. November 28, 1878. p. 3.
- "The City: Corporal Schnapps". Chicago Tribune. April 17, 1864. p. 4.

=== Websites ===
- "African-American Soldiers During the Civil War". Library of Congress. Archived from the original on April 24, 2026.
- "Temperance and Prohibition". Library of Congress. Archived from the original on July 24, 2026.
- Nelson, Dean (2008). "Marching with Henry C. Work". Museum of Connecticut History. Archived from the original on April 11, 2026.
- "Grandfather clock". Oxford English Dictionary. September 2015.
- "Crossing the Grand Sierras". Song of America. Archived from the original on August 27, 2026.
- "Exhibit: Henry C. Work". Songwriters Hall of Fame. Archived from the original on March 10, 2026.
- "Henry Clay Work". Song of America. Archived from the original on August 27, 2026.
- Webster, Ian (August 12, 2026). "Inflation Calculator". CPI Inflation Calculator. Archived from the original on August 27, 2026.
