= Cue (magazine) =

US magazine

- Categories: listings
- Frequency: weekly
- Publisher: Mort Glankoff
- Total circulation: 300,000 (1980)
- Founder: Mort Glankoff
- First issue: November 5, 1932; 94 years ago
- Final issue: April 25, 1980; 46 years ago
- Based in: New York, New York
- ISSN: 0011-2658

Cue was a weekly magazine that covered theatre and arts events in New York from 1932 to 1980, when it was taken over by New York magazine.

Cue was the first of the city magazines, serving as a model for those that followed.

== History ==
Cue was founded in 1932 by Mort Glankoff.

Claudette Colbert was on the cover of the first issue. The magazine's focus was evident from its various taglines over the years:

- Naborhood Theater Guide
- The Weekly Magazine of Stage and Screen
- The Weekly Magazine of New York Life
- New York's own Entertainment Magazine
- New York's only complete entertainment weekly
- Where to go—What to do—in New York
- The complete entertainment guide for New York and the Suburbs
- For New York and the Suburbs The complete entertainment guide.

Cue was an early listings magazine. BBC's Radio Times listed radio schedules in 1923. Cue, with its city-specific focus, was the model for a genre that came to include Time Out, which now has 108 city editions.

Glankoff sold Cue to Rupert Murdoch's New York magazine in 1980. Cue was prized for its listings section. Glankoff died in August 1986.

David Ewen was music editor for Cue in 1937 and 1938.

== See also ==
- Media of New York City
