= Thomas Grey =

Thomas Grey may refer to:

- Sir Thomas Grey (constable) (died c. 1344), English soldier, Constable of Norham Castle
- Sir Thomas Grey (chronicler) (died c. 1369), English soldier and chronicler, son of the above
- Sir Thomas Grey (conspirator) (1384–1415), English aristocrat, ringleader of the Southampton Plot
- Thomas Grey, 1st Marquess of Dorset (1455–1501), English nobleman and courtier, also Earl of Huntingdon
- Thomas Grey, 2nd Marquess of Dorset (1477–1530), English magnate and courtier, son of the above
- Thomas Grey (Staffordshire MP) (by 1508–1559), MP for Staffordshire in 1554
- Thomas Grey (Norwich MP) (by 1519–58), MP for Norwich in 1557
- Sir Thomas Grey (Northumberland MP, died 1570) (before 1512–1570), MP for Northumberland in 1553, 1554 and 1558
- Sir Thomas Grey (Northumberland MP, died 1590) (1549–1590), MP for Northumberland in 1586
- Thomas Grey, 15th Baron Grey de Wilton (died 1614), English aristocrat and soldier
- Thomas Grey, Lord Grey of Groby (1623–1657), Member of Parliament for Leicester
- Thomas Grey, 2nd Earl of Stamford (circa 1654–1720), Chancellor of the Duchy of Lancaster, son of the above
- Thomas Grey (poet) (1863–1928), English poet
- Tommy Grey (died 1915), Welsh rugby union and rugby league player
- Tom Grey (1885–1957), English footballer
- Thomas C. Grey, American legal academic and historian

== See also ==
- Thomas de Grey (disambiguation)
- Thomas Gray (disambiguation)
