= J. W. Kelly =

Irish-born American brewer

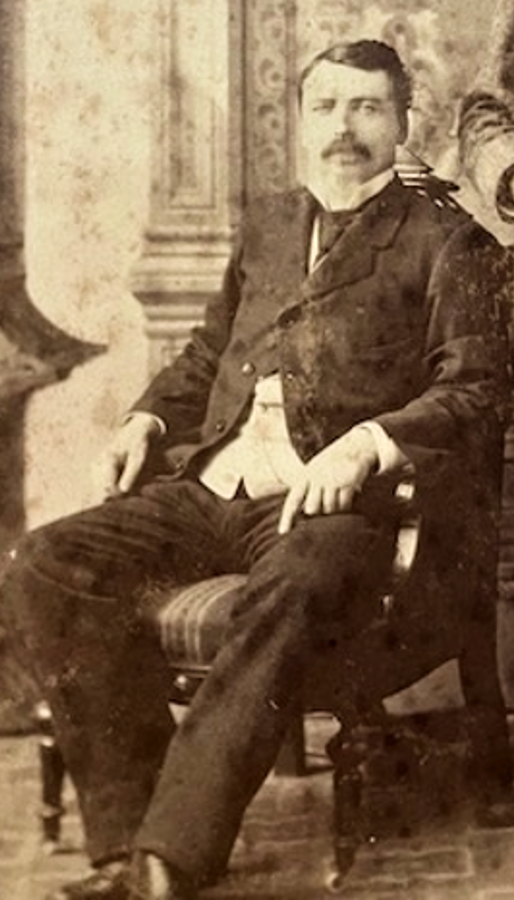
- Born: James Watt Kelly; February 26, 1844; Waterford, Ireland
- Died: March 10, 1907 (aged 63); Chattanooga, Tennessee, US
- Burial place: Forest Hill Cemetery, Chattanooga, TN
- Known for: Founder of the first post Civil War distillery in Chattanooga, Tennessee, Deep Spring Distillery.
- Spouse(s): Elizabeth Jane Short Kelly, September 3, 1870
- Website: http://www.jwkelly.com

James Watt Kelly was an Irish-American businessman. Kelly was the founder of J. W. Kelly & Co and Chattanooga’s first post Civil War distillery. His empire expanded to include: tobacco, cigars, cigarettes, domestic and international spirit imports, and a vast amount of real estate ventures across many states.

== Early life ==
James Watt Kelly was born on February 26, 1844, in Waterford, Ireland. When Kelly was eight years old, his family moved from Waterford to Dublin, where he received a business education, specifically in the wholesale wine trade.

His father’s name was Henry William Kelly, and he was an auctioneer, with offices in Dublin and Waterford. Henry Kelly's office in Waterford was at 18 Lombard Street; which was the birthplace of New Zealand's first governor, William Hobson. Kelly's mother's name was Eliza Watt. The Kelly's had three children, including two daughters: Mary Agnes Kelly Scott and Eliza Jane Kelly Smith. J. W. Kelly and Lord Roberts were first cousins. Kelly was also related to James Watt, who was a barrister and Queen Victoria's proctor for Ireland in 1850. Another of Kelly's relatives was Dr. John Watt, a surgeon in the British Army who served in the Crimean Campaign. Dr. Watt died at Kelly's home in Chattanooga in 1890.

In February 1863, just after his nineteenth birthday, J. W. Kelly emigrated to New York. He lived and worked in New York for a year, and then decided to move to Nashville, Tennessee. There he worked for a man named R. H. Singleton, who was in the book and stationery business. Kelly assisted Singleton with compiling and printing the first directory ever published in Nashville.

Tennessee was the last state to join the Confederacy in 1861. At the time, Nashville was targeted by the Union forces as the capital of the state, and for its significant shipping port. Union forces occupied the city as early as 1862.

In December 1864, the Battle of Nashville ensued. The Confederate Army of Tennessee was nearly destroyed, and the Union troops seized Nashville and held onto it, despite several attempts by the Confederacy to reclaim the city. The population boomed due to the available jobs in places like the depot, warehouses, and hospitals. As a result, Nashville also had a successful red-light district and dozens of saloons. Kelly utilized his early business education and he rectified and sold his own whiskey.

Kelly married Elizabeth (Lizzie) Jane Short on September 3, 1870, in Waterford, Ireland. Mrs. Kelly became an equally prominent figure in Chattanooga society, known for hosting elaborate home parties as well as serving on the board of several church and charity events.

== Business career ==
In September 1866, Kelly decided to return to New York via Chattanooga, Tennessee to collect a debt. Failing to collect this debt, Kelly decided to stay in the city and wait to be repaid; and while he waited, Kelly decided to rent a storefront for one month from a man named Daniel Kaylor. He founded J. W. Kelly & Co and began to build Deep Spring Distillery; which was fully functional by 1870. Kelly obtained several distribution partnerships with multiple tobacco, cigar, and liquor brands. He also began to distill his own whiskey.

The J. W. Kelly & Co umbrella consisted of two important partnerships in the beginning. The first partnership began almost immediately after Kelly opened up his storefront, Kelly & Webb. Kelly partnered with a man named John G. Webb to expand beyond liquor. Kelly & Webb were importers and wholesalers of foreign fruits, French confectionary, nuts, spices, jellies, and imported Cuban, German, and domestic cigars. Their store was originally located at 63-65 Ninth Street (or as stated in their advertisements “the corner of 9th and Railroad Street”). The store sustained minor damage during the fire that burned down the Crutchfield House (now the Read House) in 1867. In December, 1872, Kelly and Webb purchased restaurant space beneath the new Read House. This became Webb's main business for almost two years, by March 1874 he'd sold his primary interest. Kelly sold his second interest in October 1874. Around 1875, Kelly and Webb moved their store to 253 Market Street, where it remained even after the partnership dissolved in 1876.

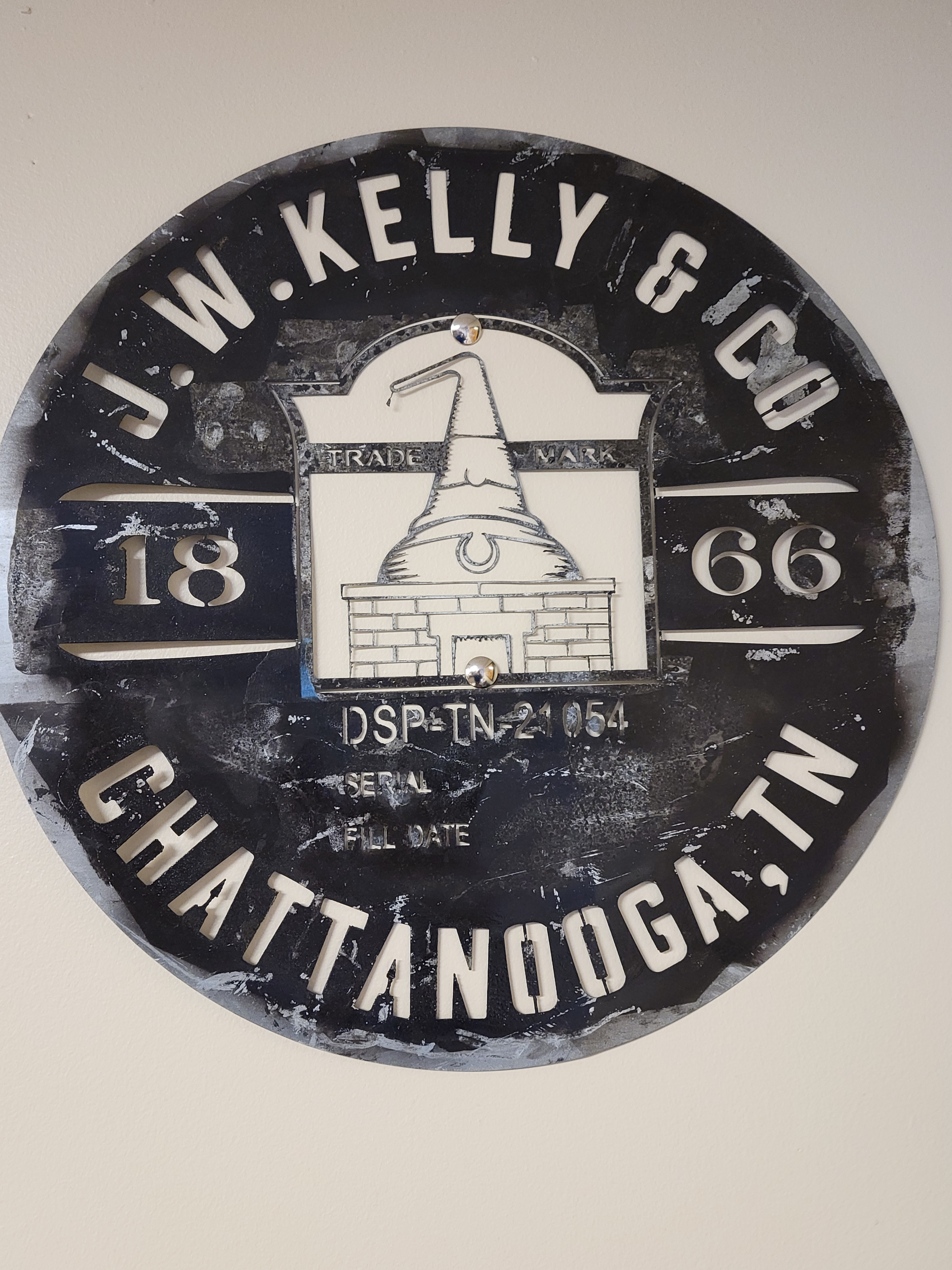

After parting with Webb, Kelly further expanded his own name as an importer and dealer in wines, liquors, ales, champagne, and cigars, both foreign and domestic. Some of his imports included Hennessey, Guinness, and Claret. He also brought in wines from California.

The second partnership was between J. W. Kelly and George W. Davenport. This partnership began towards the end of 1876 and expanded beyond groceries, whiskey and tobacco. They bought and sold real estate; which included buying several saloons and bars and reselling the leases to others to run them for the company. They also were prominent landlords for stores and private homes, as well as retail spaces that were utilized for meeting spaces for various clubs in Chattanooga, such as the Irish-American League – of which Kelly was a founding board member. Their new location at 13-15 West Ninth Street allowed for space above and below for leasing.

During their tenure, Kelly and Davenport were the sole distributors in the area for several brands of spirits, wines, and tobacco and they ran a whiskey, tobacco and real estate empire until 1890, when Davenport retired from the firm. Davenport went on to open a dry goods wholesale house with his brother in August 1890.

Kelly continued his tobacco and whiskey imports, bringing in California Wines, Jefferson Cigars, Budweiser, Schlitz, and Pabst Blue Ribbon beer, among so many other imported spirits and tobacco to the Chattanooga area. He was the sole agent in the area for several cigarette brands like Nancy Bell and The Wedding Blossom Cigar. Though his own brands of whiskey were included in his sales, by all accounts Kelly’s own whiskey products took off after Davenport’s exit. He bottled about twelve labels in all, including his best-known brand, Deep Spring. Some of the other labels included: Cedar Bluff Rye Whiskey, Golden Age Rye, O.P.S. Belmont Rye, Old Milford, Old AA Lincoln County Whiskey, Tennessee Corn Whiskey, Mountain City Corn Shuck, Old Tennessee Sugar Corn, Pine Split Gin, Silver Spring Corn Malt Whisky, Red Banks Hand Made Sour Mash Whiskey, and Melrose Rye.

He also further expanded his real estate empire; which included ownership of several saloons, grocery stores, and other commercial property. Kelly owned the bar, the billiards, the cigar shop, and one restaurant within the Read House; which had been across the street from his main establishments since it opened in 1872.

In 1900, Kelly brought in a new vice president, Carl White. It was also at this time that the name of the company evolved from J. W. Kelly to J. W. Kelly & Co. White served as vice president until J. W. Kelly appointed him president of the company around 1906. Kelly remained CEO until his death in 1907.

== Death ==
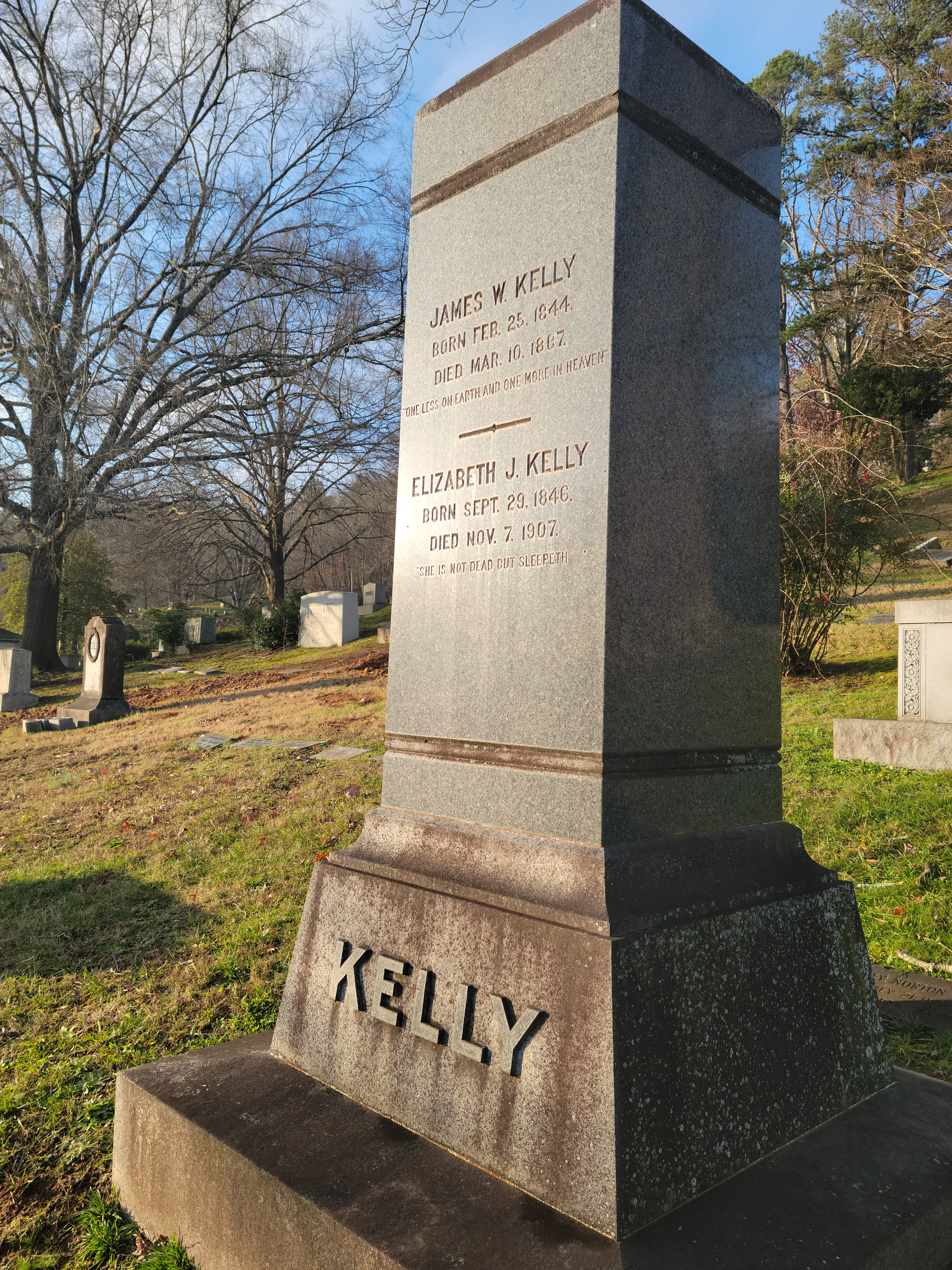

Illness plagued Kelly throughout his life. He often took trips to regain his health to places like Hot Springs, Arkansas. In early 1906, Kelly became seriously ill. It is believed that this is when Carl White became president of J. W. Kelly & Co. By April, he was much better and doctors pronounced him out of danger. However, by mid-August of the same year, Kelly again was seriously ill; which lasted into the fall. In late February 1907, he was again too ill to leave his home.

On the morning of March 10, 1907, Kelly felt well enough to join his wife in entertaining some visiting relatives at their home; which was located at 506 Vine Street, Chattanooga. After luncheon at noon, he decided to take a nap in his upstairs bedroom. At about 2:30, Mrs. Kelly went in to check on him and found him unresponsive. “Dr. Berlin has hastily called and on investigation discovered that death had been caused by blood clot on the brain, the end having probably come in a twinkling, perhaps an hour before the body was found.” On his interment record, it lists “Embolism” as his cause of death. His sole heiress was his wife. The Kelly's had no children.

Elizabeth J. Kelly followed him in death on November 7, 1907; passing after a long illness. Her official cause of death is listed as “emphysema”. The Kelly’s are interred together in Forest Hills Cemetery, Section K, Lot 74. Her will listed many beneficiaries, including some charities, and named her niece Louise Evelyn Maud Longmire as executrix.

After Mrs. Kelly's passing, several relatives of J. W. Kelly stepped forward to claim a share of the estate, which was worth an estimated $100,000 ($2.97 million in 2022) in real estate alone. These relatives were from Canada, England, Ireland, New Zealand, and India and numbered 13 in all. Some were specifically named in Mrs. Kelly's will (updated in May 1907), others were not. In Mrs. Kelly's will there are thirty-one beneficiaries listed, including some charities, and the bequests totaled almost $362,000 ($10.7 million in 2022) All claims on the Estates of J. W. and Elizabeth J. Kelly were settled late in 1908.

== J. W. Kelly & Co. ==
After both Mr. and Mrs. Kelly’s deaths, Carl White installed a new team of executives at J. W. Kelly & Co that included: J. S. Cannon (Vice President), P. L. Mitchell (General Manager), Cecil C. DeBardelaben (Sales), and Thomas P. Hagan (Secretary and Treasurer). Their focus was on marketing the alcoholic beverages not only distilled at Deep Spring Distillery, but also on importing spirits from all around the United States and from Europe. This is despite meeting resistance with many temperance societies.

Tennessee was one of the first states to prohibit the manufacture and distribution of alcohol within the state. In 1877, a law was enacted forbidding the sale of alcohol within four miles of chartered rural schools. This was amended in 1887 to prohibit the sale of liquor within four miles of any country school; which virtually banned liquor trade in rural Tennessee. By 1903, two more acts were passed that extended the four-mile law to populations of all towns with populations up to 5,000 people. By the end of 1907, the Pendleton Act extended the original Four-Mile Law to the larger cities. Chattanooga was one of four major cities that remained wet.

On January 13, 1909, the Tennessee legislature passed the Holladay Bill; which forbid the sale of liquor within four miles of any school in the state. The second law passed that day prohibited the manufacture of intoxicating beverages. The company closed its Deep Spring Distillery in July 1909, but reopened it in October to fill out-of-state mail orders for liquor. J. W. Kelly & Co also filed a bill that claimed that "the 1909 four-mile law ... did not apply to wholesale dealers selling at wholesale in quantities of a quart or more, not to be drunk at the place of sale, and second, that if the four-mile law did apply to such sales, it was in contravention of several provisions of the state and federal constitutions". This case was dismissed by the state supreme court, on the grounds that there was no jurisdiction. A new motion regarding interstate sales was then filed and in 1910 the state supreme court ruled that the law didn't prohibit interstate sales and shipments.

In February 1911, Henry Kraver sold one-half interest in the Kentucky Peerless Distilling Plant to Carl White for $40,000 ($1.17 million in 2022). Improvements were made and the capacity was doubled. This is also when J. W. Kelly & Co. began to list their Kentucky distillery in their advertisements.

After Tennessee passed the "Bone Dry Bill" in 1917, which made illegal the receipt or possession of liquor and prohibited the transportation of liquor in and out of the state, J. W. Kelly & Co moved production to Henderson, KY. The company moved out of the building they'd built at 13-15 W. Ninth Street and settled for a smaller office in Chattanooga and corporate offices in Lexington, KY, Chicago, IL, and New York, NY. They sold non-alcoholic beverages in the state of Tennessee, but kept up their distributorships with companies like Budweiser.

J. W. Kelly & Co continued operations until the ratification of the Eighteenth Amendment to the U.S. Constitution in 1919.

Deep Spring Distillery was demolished in 1927 at the request of the sole remaining board member of the company, Carl White. White then later sued the contractor, claiming "that he wrecked it, sold the scraps, and kept the money".

== Kelly Cigar Company ==
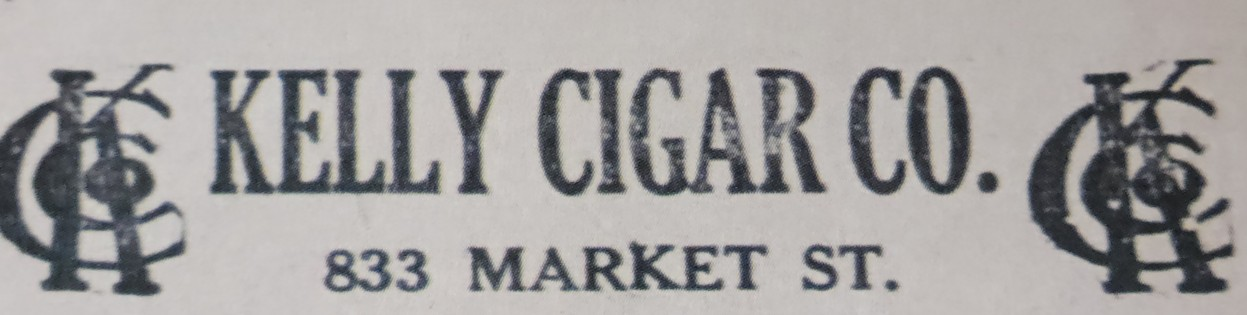

J. W. Kelly began selling cigars, cigarettes, and other tobacco at his first store in Chattanooga; which he set up in 1866. He divided his attention between tobacco, whiskey, and real estate. It was not a stretch to create another separate umbrella. In 1909, facing impending issues with alcohol production, the company branched off Kelly Cigar Company and called their flagship store Kelly Cigar Store. Their original home was at 833 Market Street in downtown Chattanooga. The company moved several times before settling at 1144 Market Street in 1927.

Kelly Cigar Company offered multiple brands of cigars, cigarettes, and tobacco. They also offered novelty drinks and other items; such as imported ink pens. Kelly Cigar Company was also the downtown box office for the Lyric Theater here in Chattanooga.

The company changed owners many times between 1914 and 1919, when it was sold to the Couch Brothers and Webb, who renamed it (for a short period of time) to Kelly Cigar and Tobacco Company. The company remained in operation until 1956 when it was purchased by the Witt Group, a company that originated in Tampa, Florida, and who was the largest tobacco products handler in the South at the time.

Then in 1962, Kelly Cigar Company joined the Hav-A-Tampa Group, which formed when fifty tobacco distributors merged together to form the corporation. Kelly Cigar Company closed its doors in 1963. The Hav-A-Tampa company eventually became part of Imperial Tobacco, who shuttered their Ybor plant in 2009. Their cigars are now rolled in Puerto Rico.

== Relaunching J. W. Kelly ==
In 2017, Keeper's Quest re-launched the J. W. Kelly & Co brand and revived Kelly's whiskey recipe. They brought back some of Kelly's old labels: Old Milford, Melrose Rye, Golden Age. Work still continues to preserve not only the legacy of Kelly's whiskey but also of the man himself.
