= Tom Gray's Dream =

Retta M. Brown poem

"Tom Gray's Dream", also known as "The Hell-Bound Train" is a poem written by western Illinois poet Retta M. Brown (born September 18, 1893).

Tom Gray was a farmer's son, born in Indiana on November 27, 1852, whose family moved to Mercer County, Illinois. During a drunken stupor, he experienced a frightening dream that moved him to cease alcohol abuse. His niece, Retta M. Brown, wrote the poem and immortalized the nightmare. Alcohol recovery groups and certain churches have widely circulated the poem, usually without attribution. The poem has also been attributed to a J. W. Pruitt.

== Text ==
"Tom Gray's Dream":

Tom Gray lay down on the barroom floor,
Having drunk so much he could drink no more.
So he fell asleep with a troubled brain,
To dream that he rode on a hell-bound train.

The engine with blood was red and damp,
And brilliantly lit by a brimstone lamp;
While the imp for fuel were shoveling bones,
The furnace rang with a thousand groans.

The Devil himself was the engineer
The boiler was filled with lager beer;
The passengers made such a motley crew-
Church member, atheist, Gentile, and Jew.

Rich men in broadcloth's and beggars in rags,
Handsome young ladies and withered old hags,
Yellow and red men, brown, black and white,
All chained together what a horrible sight!

And as the train dashed on at an awful pace
Hot winds scorched them hands and face
Wilder and wilder the country grew
As faster and faster the engine flew

Louder and louder the thunder crashed
as brighter and brighter the lighting crashed
Hotter and hotter the air became
Til all clothes were burnt from each quivering frame

Then there in the distance there rose such a yell,
"Ha! Ha!" croaked the Devil, "we're nearing hell."
Then oh, how the passengers shrieked with pain,
And begged of the Devil to stop the train!
But he capered about and danced with glee,
And laughed and joked at their agony.

Why my "Faithful friends, you have done my work,
The Devil could never payday shirk. Why
You've bullied the weak, and robbed the poor,
And a starving brother you've turned from your door;
You've laid up gold where the canker rusts,
And given free vent to your fleshly lusts;

Justice you've scorned and corruption you've sown,
While you've trampled the laws of nature down;
You've drunken and rioted, murdered and lied,
And mocked at God in your hell-born pride.
You have paid full fare, so I'll carry you through,
For it's only right you should get your just due.

Why, the laborer always expects his hire;
So I'll land you safe in the lake of fire.
Where your bones shall roast in the flames that roar,
And my imps torment you more and more."

Then Tom awoke with an agonized cry,
His clothes soaked with sweat, his hair standing high;
And he prayed as he never had prayed before
To be saved from drink and the Devil's power;
And his prayers and his cries were not in vain,
For he never more rode on the hell-bound train.
