= Susan McFarland Parkhurst =

American writer and composer

Susan McFarland Parkhurst (5 June 1836 – 4 May 1918) was an American writer and composer.

== Life ==
Susan McFarland was born in Leicester, Massachusetts, and composed popular songs and parlour piano solos during the 1860s. She was first recorded as an accompanist and soloist at a Methodist concert in New York City in 1860.

She married E.A. Parkhurst and had a daughter, Effie. Her husband died in action in 1864 during the Civil War. She took a job at Waters's Music Store where she met Stephen Foster and began to write songs, mostly on topical and religious themes. She and her daughter performed her song "Father's a Drunkard and Mother is Dead" in concert and it became a standard at temperance meetings in New York. Parkhurst died in Brooklyn, New York.

Stephen Foster's New York publisher Horace Waters printed a Select Catalogue of Mrs. E.A. Parkhurst's Compositions in 1864. She also provided songs for Horace Waters' hymnals. Original prints of her songs are housed in the Music Division of the New York Public Library and her instrumental works are archived at the American Antiquarian Society, Worcester, Massachusetts.

== Works ==
Parkhurst was noted for songs on themes such as themes as temperance, abolition, and campaign songs for political candidates such as Ulysses S. Grant, and also wrote sacred songs. Selected works include:

- "Father's a Drunkard and Mother Is Dead" (Lyrics and Music)
- "New Emancipation Song" (1864)
- "There Are Voices" (1864)
- "Spirit Voices" (1864)
- "Weep No More for Lilly" (1864)
- "The Athenaeum" (1863)
- "The Golden Harp" (1863)
- "Zion's Refreshing Showers" (1867)
- "Grant-ed" (1868)

In September 1916 she published "Personal Recollections of the Last Days of Stephen Foster" in The Etude magazine.
