= David Ewen (writer) =

American writer (1907–1985)

David Ewen (November 26, 1907 – December 28, 1985) was an American writer on music and editor.

== Life and career ==
Ewen was a native of Lviv, immigrating in 1912 to the United States with his family. He attended classes at the City College of New York, and studied musicology at Columbia University; he also received private lessons in piano and music theory, the latter with Max Persin. From 1928 until 1929 he was music editor at Reflex Magazine, and occupied the same position at The American Hebrew in 1935; from 1937 until 1938 he was music editor of Cue, and from 1938 to 1939 he worked as a record critic for Stage. From 1940 until 1941 he was the editor of Musical Facts. Moving to the world of book publishing, he was a founder, and from 1946 until 1949 director, of the publishing company Allen, Towne and Heath, which specialized in books on music. In 1965 Ewen was appointed to the position of associate professor of music at the University of Miami. The university awarded him an honorary doctorate in music in 1974, and in 1985 he was the recipient of the ASCAP Award for Lifetime Achievement in Music. At the time of his death from heart disease, Ewen lived in Boca Raton, Florida; he died in Miami.

Ewen began his career as a writer in 1931 with the publication of a book on Franz Schubert. His interest in music was broad, and covered topics in both serious and more popular genres; he was, perhaps, most recognized for the reference works he compiled on the subjects of musical theater in the United States and on American popular music. His writing appeared in major publications on music in both the United States and England, and his work was featured in numerous nationally recognized newspapers and magazines, among them The New York Times. By the time of his death, his catalog ran to some 85 books, a number of which were translated.

At his death Ewen was survived by his wife, Hannah, and son, Robert, as well as a granddaughter; two brothers outlived him as well.

== Selected works ==
- The Book of Modern Composers (1942; 3rd ed., 1961, as The New Book of Modern Composers)
- Encyclopedia of the Opera (1955; 2nd ed., rev., 1971 as New Encyclopedia of the Opera)
- Panorama of American Popular Music (1957)
- Complete Book of the American Musical Theater (1958; 3rd ed., rev, 1976 as New Complete Book of the American Musical Theater)
- Encyclopedia of Concert Music (1959)
- The Story of America’s Musical Theater (1961; 2nd ed., rev, 1968)
- Popular American Composers: From Revolutionary Times to the Present (1962; suppl., 1972)
- The Complete Book of Classical Music (1963)
- The Life and Death of Tin Pan Alley (1964)
- American Popular Songs: From the Revolutionary War to the Present (1966)
- Great Composers: 1300–1900 (1966)
- Composers Since 1900 (1969; suppl., 1981)
- Great Men of American Popular Song (1970; 2nd ed., rev, 1972)
- Mainstreams of Music (4 vols., 1972–75)
- All the Years of American Popular Music (1977)
- Musicians Since 1900 (1978)
- American Composers: A Biographical Dictionary (1982)
