= C. M. Cady =

American music publisher and businessman (1824–1889)

Chauncey Marvin Cady (May 16, 1824, Westport – June 16, 1889, Ashville) was an American music publisher, businessman and composer. One of the best-known men of the trade, his public service to Chicago has been regarded as pivotal to the advancement of the city's music scene in the mid-19th century. Among the numerous roles of authority he held were as the first music teacher at Illinois State Normal University and the first conductor of the Chicago Musical Union. He was a founder and partner of Root & Cady that dominated Civil War and early Reconstruction-era music publication.

== Early life and career ==
He was born on May 16, 1824.

== Chicago career ==
=== Establishment of Root & Cady ===
No firm attained such success in publishing Unionist music as Chicago-based Root & Cady, "the largest of [...] the era" and "most prolific producers of wartime music." It was established in 1858 by Ebenezer T. Root and Chauncey M. Cady and, from 1860 onwards, principally operated by George F. Root. Root was one of the most renowned composers of the Civil War era, with such tunes as "Battle Cry of Freedom" and "Tramp! Tramp! Tramp!" to his name. By the war's opening weeks, his firm was receiving roughly sixty daily submissions; throughout the conflict, it published over a hundred songs. In fact, it issued the very first Unionist composition, "The First Gun is Fired!", in response to the attack on Fort Sumter.

=== Civil War efforts ===
In 1862 Cady hired acclaimed violinist William Lewis, later founder of the William Lewis & Son Co. publishing house, as a Root & Cady salesman. After the firm shut down, following the Great Chicago Fire and Panic of 1873, Lewis formed an alliance with Towner Root to create Root & Lewis, eventually amalgamated into George F. Root's firms owing to poor sales. He served as president of the Hyde Park Board of Trustees from 1868 to 1874.

=== Postbellum ===
The postbellum years were looking bright for Root & Cady. Publications and song anthologies, among them, the temperance song compilation titled The Musical Fountain, were being churned out at a rate surpassing even their wartime production. The Chicagoan music scene was as lively as ever. George F. Root also distinguished himself as a prominent campaigner for Ulysses S. Grant in the 1868 presidential election. However, their prospects came crashing down in the fall of 1871 when the firm burnt down in the Great Chicago Fire, incurring $315,000 (Note: Roughly equating to $8.1 million in 2024.) in losses. It raged on from October 8 to October 10, destroying all waterworks, banking houses and railway depots, and caused a minor depression in the national stock market. Every business in the city's south wing was obliterated; it was reported that over 20,000 buildings were demolished, wreaking over $200,000,000 (Note: Roughly equating to $5.1 billion in 2024.) in damages.

Root remarked in the Song Messenger: "All is gone, my musical library and the thousand useful things that I have gathered about me in so many busy years, swept in a moment." Unable to continue the business in its former rendition, Root & Cady's music copyrights were all sold to Ohioan publishers S. Brainard Sons and John Church & Co. The firm filed for bankruptcy in 1872. Root continued his former teaching profession and Cady left Chicago for New York.

== New York career ==
After Root & Cady shut down, Root pursued some more ventures in music firms, culminating in the Root & Sons Music Company which bore some success until dissolving in 1880. His business partner Chauncey M. Cady also sought to reinitiate a profitable career as a music publisher. He established a business at 107 Duane Street, New York City, in 1875, lasting five years until shutting it down owing to fatigue from old age. In 1876, while roaming in Broadway, he stumbled across his former employee Henry Clay Work who had quit songwriting, dispirited by financial and familial woes. Cady opportunely invited him to the new business. Eager to pick up songwriting once again, Work accepted; he published nine songs for Cady from 1876 to 1879.

In 1876 he published a book of doxologies compiled by Theodore Wood, The Heavenly Choir. Three years later, he published a compilation of renowned parlor songs incorporating hallmark piano tunes of the classical and romantic eras titled Parlor Gems. He was the librettist of an 1894 cantata, Esther, the Beautiful Queen, narrating the story of the biblical heroine Esther.

=== "Grandfather's Clock" ===
"Grandfather's Clock"
First verse and chorus

My grandfather's clock was too large for the shelf,
So it stood ninety years on the floor;
It was taller by half than the old man himself,
Though it weighed not a pennyweight more.
It was bought on the morn of the day that he was born,
And was always his treasure and pride;
But it stopped short never to go again
When the old man died.

Ninety years without slumbering (tick, tick, tick, tick)
His life seconds numbering (tick, tick, tick, tick)
It stopped short never to go again
When the old man died.

Work's most profitable hit, also his last, was "Grandfather's Clock," issued by Cady in January 1876 and popularized by African-American entertainer Sam Lucas in New Haven. Inspired by his sympathetic attitude toward disaffected individuals, he anthropomorphizes a clock to signify its owner; it had stood for ninety years throughout the "old man"'s life and accompanied him.

Although Work awaited nothing beyond a moderate hit, Cady expected a widespread success. His prophecy was proven correct: the song secured over 800,000 sheet music sales. It also coined the phrase "grandfather clock" to describe a longcase clock. After Work sold the copyright to "Grandfather's Clock," Cady paid him a royalty of $4,000, (Note: Roughly equating to $125,000 in 2024.) helping to lift him out of poverty. (Note: Cady paid Work $250 in monthly royalties for "Grandfather's Clock," amounting to $4,000 by 1879. However, an 1884 issue of the Evening Capital claims that Work earned $300 a month, as opposed to $250.) In total, this was the highest bestowed to any American composer at the time, only possibly surpassed by Stephen Foster's "Old Folks at Home." An 1879 issue of the San Marcos Free Press highlights its ubiquity, claiming that not knowing the song "argues yourself unknown," being "nightly played in theater and concert halls to applauding auditors." American music historian John T. Howard claims that "there is scarcely a school songbook" excluding "Grandfather's Clock."

"Grandfather's Clock" performed by the Edison Quartet in 1905.

== Legacy ==
He formed part of the inaugural executive committee of the Old Republic Life Insurance Company founded by Paul Cornell.

== Bibliography ==
=== Books ===
==== Primary sources ====
- Bradbury, William B.; Cady, Chauncey M. (1896). Esther, the Beautiful Queen: A Sacred Cantata (2nd ed.). Boston: Oliver Ditson Company.
- Cady, Chauncey M. (1879). Parlor Gems: A Choice Selection of Music, Instrumental and Vocal, by the Best Composers, to Which Is Added Original Charades for Parlor Performance. New York City: C. M. Cady.
- Root, George F. (1891). The Story of a Musical Life: An Autobiography by Geo F. Root. Cincinnati, Ohio: The John Church Co. ISBN 978-1-4047-8329-4.
- Root, George F.; Sawyer, Charles C.; Work, Henry C., eds. (1892). Our National War Songs (2 ed.). Chicago: The S. Brainard's Sons Co.
- Wood, Theodore (1876). The Heavenly Choir: A Collection of Hymns and Tunes for All Occasions of Worship, Congregational, Church, Prayer, Praise, Choir, Sunday School, and Social Meetings. New York City: C. M. Cady.
- Work, Henry C. (1884). Work, Bertram G. (ed.). Songs of Henry Clay Work. New York City: Little & Ives.

==== Secondary sources ====
- Andreas, Alfred T. (1884). History of Cook County Illinois: From the Earliest Period to the Present Time. Chicago.
- Carder, P. H. (2008). George F. Root, Civil War Songwriter: A Biography. Jefferson, NC: McFarland & Company, Inc. ISBN 978-0-7864-3374-2.
- Drury, John (1975). Old Chicago Houses. Chicago: University of Chicago Press. ISBN 0-226-16555-8.
- Ewen, David (1962). Popular American Composers from Revolutionary Times to the Present: A Biographical and Critical Guide. New York City: H. W. Wilson Company, Inc. ISBN 978-0824200404.
- Ewing, George W. (1977). The Well-Tempered Lyre: Songs and Verse of the Temperance Movements. Dallas: Southern Methodist University Press. ISBN 0-870-740-008.
- Finson, Jon W. (1994). The Voices That Are Gone: Themes in Nineteenth-Century American Popular Song. New York City: Oxford University Press. ISBN 0-19-505750-3.
- Graham, Sandra Jean (2018). "25: Composing in Black and White". In Hall, Patricia Ann (ed.). The Oxford Handbook of Music Censorship. New York City: Oxford University Press. ISBN 9780199984183.
- Herder, Ronald (1998). 500 Best-Loved Song Lyrics. Mineola, NY: Dover Publications, Inc. ISBN 0-486-29725-X.
- Howard, John Tasker; Bellows, George Kent (1967). A Short History of Music in America. New York City: McFarland & Company, Inc. ISBN 0-8152-0162-1.
- Kelley, Bruce C.; Snell, Mark A. (2004). Bugle Resounding: Music and Musicians of the Civil War Era. Columbia: University of Missouri Press. ISBN 0-8262-1538-6.
- McWhirter, Christian (2012). Battle Hymns: The Power and Popularity of Music in the Civil War. Chapel Hill, NC: University of North Carolina Press. ISBN 978-0-8078-3550-0.
- Merriam-Webster, Inc., ed. (2000). Merriam-Webster's Collegiate Dictionary (3rd ed.). Springfield, MA. ISBN 978-0-87779-807-1.
- Shepherd, John (2003). Continuum Encyclopedia of Popular Music of the World. Vol. 1. New York City: Continuum International Publishing Group. ISBN 0-8264-6321-5.
- Silber, Irwin (1995). Songs of the Civil War. Mineola, NY: Dover Publications. ISBN 0-486-28438-7.

=== Studies and journals ===
- Birdseye, George (1879). "America's Song Composers: II. George F. Root". Potter's American Monthly. 12 (86): 145–148 – via Internet Archive.
- Birdseye, George (1879). "America's Song Composers: IV. Henry Clay Work". Potter's American Monthly. 12 (88): 284–288 – via Internet Archive.
- Epstein, Dena J. (1944). "Music Publishing in Chicago before 1871 An Introduction". Notes. 1 (3): 3–11. doi:10.2307/891124. JSTOR 891291.
- Epstein, Dena J. (1944). "Music Publishing in Chicago before 1871: The Firm of Root & Cady, 1858–1871". Notes. 1 (4): 43–59. doi:10.2307/891291. JSTOR 891291.
- Epstein, Dena J. (1944). "III. Root & Cady Prior to the Civil War". Music Publishing in Chicago before 1871. Vol. 2. pp. 16–26. doi:10.2307/891018. JSTOR 891291.
- Epstein, Dena J. (1945). "IV. The Civil War Period". Music Publishing in Chicago before 1871. Vol. 2. pp. 124–148. doi:10.2307/890390. JSTOR 891291.
- Epstein, Dena J. (1945). "V. The Post-War Years, 1866–1868". Music Publishing in Chicago before 1871. Vol. 2. pp. 201–226. doi:10.2307/890105. JSTOR 891291.
- Epstein, Dena J. (1945). "VI, the End of the Firm, 1868–1871". Music Publishing in Chicago before 1871. Vol. 3. pp. 80–98, 101–109. doi:10.2307/891291. JSTOR 891291.
- Epstein, Dena J. (1946). "VII Conclusion". Music Publishing in Chicago before 1871. Vol. 3. pp. 193–215. doi:10.2307/891428. JSTOR 891291.
- Hill, Richard S. (1953). "The Mysterious Chord of Henry Clay Work". Notes. 10 (2): 211–225. doi:10.2307/892874. JSTOR 892874.
- Hill, Richard S. (1953). "The Mysterious Chord of Henry Clay Work (Conclusion)". Notes. 10 (3): 367–390. doi:10.2307/892162. JSTOR 892162.
- "The Republic Life Insurance Company". The Lakeside Monthly. 6 (34): 288. 1871 – via Google Books.
- Tribble, Edwin (1967). "Marching Through Georgia". The Georgia Review. 21 (4): 423–429. JSTOR 41396391.

=== Newspaper articles ===
- McCray, Florine Thayer (January 19, 1898). "About Henry Clay Work". New Haven Morning Journal and Courier. p. 10.
- "Dies Iræ!: Another Fearful Fire at Chicago". Nashville Union and American. October 10, 1871. p. 1.
- "Famous Songs and their History: No. 5—Marching Through Georgia—By Henry C. Work". Salt Lake Herald Republican. August 15, 1909. p. 21.
- "Henry Clay Work: The Famous Song Writer Ends His Life in Hartford". New Haven Morning Journal and Courier. June 10, 1884. p. 2.
- "Herald Notes". The Morning Herald. November 4, 1878. p. 3.
- "Items of Interest". Narragansett Herald. April 12, 1879. p. 1.
- "Music in the West: History of Chicago's Progress in the Divine Art". Chicago Tribune. December 18, 1892 – via Chicagology.
- "Musical Affair". The Manitowoc Tribune. May 9, 1867. p. 2.
- "My Grandfather's Clock: A Song that was Suddenly Made Popular—Henry C. Work's Melodies". San Marcos Free Press. January 25, 1879. p. 3.
- "Old Favorites: Grandfather's Clock". Grant County Herald. December 27, 1905. p. 7.
- "Page 2". The Toledo Chronicle. July 15, 1875. p. 2.
- "Page 2". Evening Capital. July 18, 1884. p. 2.
- "Stories Of Old Songs: Marching Through Georgia". Washington Standard. August 13, 1920. p. 6.
- "Songs for the Million". The Saturday Evening Post. April 12, 1862. p. 4.
- "The Author of "Grandfather's Clock"". The Farmer and Mechanic. Vol. 3, no. 7. November 28, 1878. p. 3.
- "The Chicago Fire". Mineral Point Tribune. October 19, 1871. p. 4.
- "The City: Geo. F. Root". Chicago Tribune. May 10, 1864. p. 4.

=== Websites ===
- "African-American Soldiers During the Civil War". Library of Congress.
- Webster, Ian. "CPI Inflation Calculator". officialdata.org.
- "Henry Clay Work". Song of America.
- "George Frederick Root". Song of America.
- "Grandfather clock". Oxford English Dictionary. September 2015.
- "The Emancipation Proclamation". National Archives. January 28, 2022.

=== Song manuscripts ===
- Work, Henry C. (1877). Mac O'Macorkity. New York City: C. M. Cady.
- Work, Henry C. (1878). Sequel to Grandfather's Clock. New York City: C. M. Cady – via Library of Congress.
