= Marching Through Georgia =

1865 patriotic song by Henry Clay Work

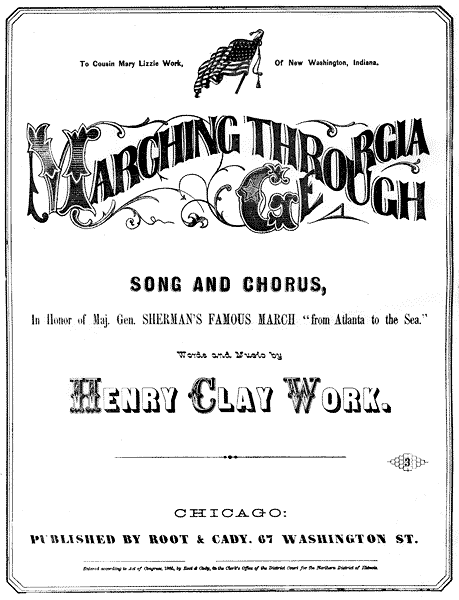
Original 1865 sheet music cover of "Marching Through Georgia" by S. Brainard Sons

"Marching Through Georgia" is an 1865 American Civil War-era song written by Henry Clay Work. It is sung from the perspective of a Union soldier who had participated in Sherman's March to the Sea; he looks back on the triumph after which Georgia became a "thoroughfare for freedom" and the Confederacy neared collapse.

Work made a name for himself in the Civil War for penning songs that reflected the Union's struggle and progress in the war. The music publishing house Root & Cady employed him in 1861, a post he maintained throughout the war. Following the March to the Sea, a Union triumph that left Confederate resources in tatters and civilians in anguish, Work was inspired to write a commemorative tune, "Marching Through Georgia".

The song was released in January 1865 to widespread success. One of the few Civil War compositions that withstood the war's end, it cemented its place at veterans' reunions and in marching parades. Sherman, to whom the song is dedicated, grew to despise it after being repeatedly subjected to its strains at public gatherings he attended. Its reputation also floundered in the South, at least in the first half of the twentieth century. "Marching Through Georgia" has lent its tune to numerous partisan hymns, such as "Billy Boys" and "The Land". Beyond the United States, troops across the world adopted it as a marching standard, from the Japanese in the Russo–Japanese War to the British in World War Two.

== Background ==
=== Work as a songwriter ===
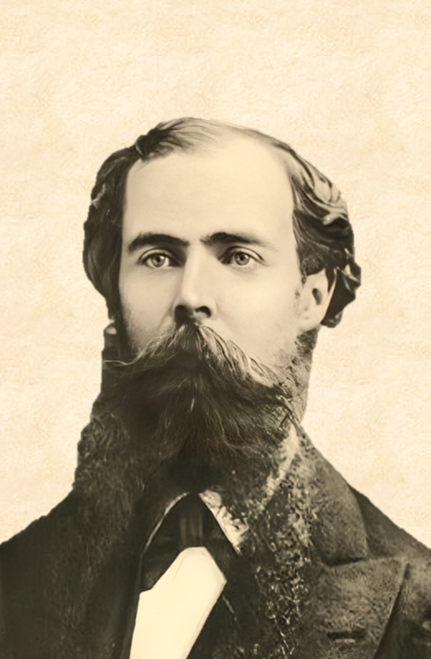
Henry Clay Work, who wrote "Marching Through Georgia" and other patriotic wartime songs

Henry Clay Work (1832–1884) was a printer by trade. However, his passion lay in music, a passion that blossomed during his youth and drew him into songwriting. He published a song for the first time in 1853, and in 1861, when the American Civil War broke out, his musical efforts took on a new life. (Note: The New Grove Dictionary notes that the American Civil War "seeded his most fecund songwriting period", and David S. Hill observes that "it was only until the tremendous success of his first war song ["Brave Boys Are They"] … that he began to take his composing seriously".) Work promptly approached the Chicagoan music publishing firm Root & Cady and presented its publishing director George F. Root with a manuscript of "Kingdom Coming". Root was impressed and assigned him a post. (Note: However, it was "Brave Boys Are They", an earlier piece, that secured Work's contract with Root & Cady, although Work presented it to Root after "Kingdom Coming".)

Throughout the Civil War, music bore great importance. As the musicologist Irwin Silber comments: "[S]oldiers and civilians of the Union states were inspired and propagandized by a host of patriotic songs." Work, a Northerner, penned 29 songs from 1861 to 1865; they have been noted for communicating the feelings of Union civilians, perhaps more so than those of any other songwriter, observes The New Grove Dictionary of Music and Musicians. Some of Work's wartime compositions also impart antislavery sentiments forged by his upbringing: his father, an abolitionist advocate, converted the family home into a station of the Underground Railroad, and Work spent much time among the freed slaves as a child.

"Marching Through Georgia" was his most successful work yet. Released around January 9, 1865, it commemorates the March to the Sea, a momentous Union triumph that had taken place a few weeks before. The song is dedicated to the campaign's mastermind, Major General William T. Sherman. While other contemporary songs honored the march, such as H. M. Higgins' "General Sherman and His Boys in Blue" and S. T. Gordon's "Sherman's March to the Sea", Silber suggested in 1995 that Work's composition remains the best known.

=== March to the Sea ===
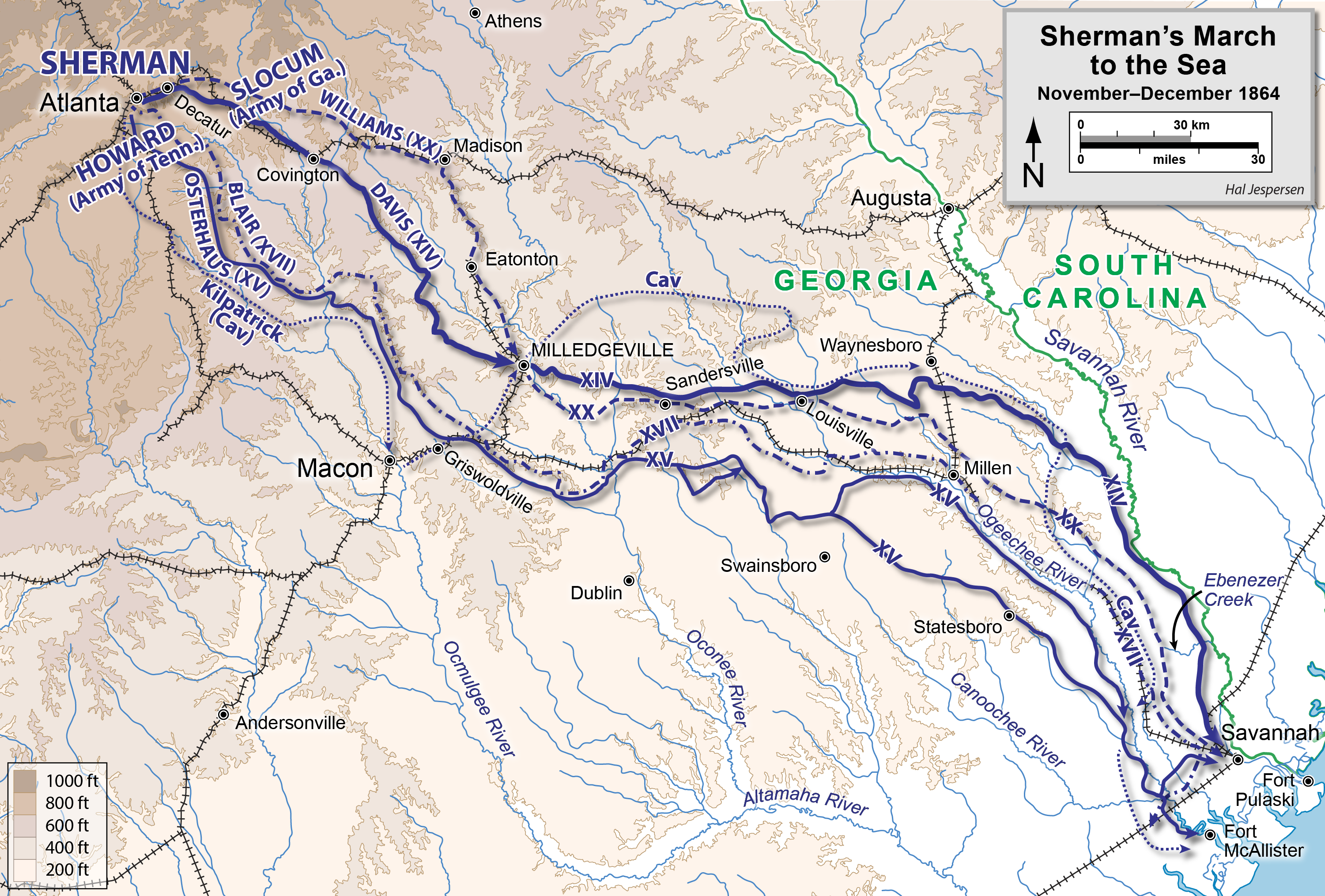
Map of the March to the Sea, lasting from November 15 to December 21, 1864

By September 1864, the Union looked set to win the war. Following three years of a bloody stalemate, Sherman's capture of Atlanta, a pivotal Southern city, proved a deliverance for the Northern cause. He then eyed the coastal city of Savannah which, if captured, would split the Confederacy in half. The plan was completed in late September 1864. On November 15, 62,000 Union troops left Atlanta and commenced the March to the Sea. They were split into two equally sized flanks, the right commanded by Maj. Gen. Oliver O. Howard and the left under Maj. Gen. Henry W. Slocum, in addition to an attached cavalry division of 5,000 men led by Brigadier General Judson Kilpatrick. The South was caught off guard and never managed to muster effective resistance. After a series of minor skirmishes and just two notable engagements, at Griswoldville and Fort McAllister, the Union army moved into Savannah on December 21. This ended the March to the Sea. Five months later, the war's Western theater closed.

Sherman's campaign bore two immediate impacts on the South. Firstly, troops left destruction and paucity in their tracks as they scavenged the land for food and resources and laid waste to public buildings and infrastructure. This fit Sherman's strategy—to persuade Southerners that the war was not worth supporting anymore. Secondly, it inspired Southern slaves to flee to freedom. Over 14,000 joined the Union troops in Georgia with brisk enthusiasm once they passed near their native plantations, cementing the campaign as a milestone of emancipation.

A pioneering use of psychological warfare and total war, the destruction wrought by Sherman's troops terrorized the South. Civilians whose territory and resources were ravaged grew so appalled at the conflict that their will to fight on dissipated, as Sherman had intended. The march further crippled the Southern economy, incurring losses of approximately $100 million according to Sherman's estimate. (Note: Roughly equating to $2.05 billion as of 2026.) In the historian Richard D. Goff's words, it "[knocked] the Confederate war effort to pieces".

== Composition ==
=== Lyrical analysis ===
Original lyrics

Bring the good old bugle boys! we'll sing another song,
Sing it with a spirit that will start the world along;
Sing it as we used to sing it fifty thousand strong,
While we were marching through Georgia.

CHORUS
"Hurrah! Hurrah! we bring the Jubilee!
Hurrah! Hurrah! the flag that makes you free!"
So we sang the chorus from Atlanta to the sea,
While we were marching through Georgia.

How the darkeys shouted when they heard the joyful sound!
How the turkeys gobbled which our commissary found!
How the sweet potatoes even started from the ground,
While we were marching through Georgia.

(CHORUS)

Yes, and there were Union men who wept with joyful tears,
When they saw the honor'd flag they had not seen for years;
Hardly could they be restrained from breaking forth in cheers,
While we were marching through Georgia.

(CHORUS)

"Sherman's dashing Yankee boys will never reach the coast!"
So the saucy rebels said, and 'twas a handsome boast,
Had they not forgot, alas! to reckon with the host,
While we were marching through Georgia.

(CHORUS)

So we made a thoroughfare for Freedom and her train,
Sixty miles in latitude—three hundred to the main;
Treason fled before us for resistance was in vain,
While we were marching through Georgia.

(CHORUS)

— Henry Clay Work

"Marching Through Georgia" is sung from a Union soldier's point of view. He had taken part in the March to the Sea and now recounts the campaign's triumphs and their repercussions on the Confederacy. The song comprises five stanzas and a refrain.

"Marching Through Georgia" sung by Harlan & Stanley in 1904

The first stanza commences with a rallying cry for Sherman's troops. Notably, it underrepresents their number as 50,000, when over 60,000 took part in the march. The chorus symbolizes the end of African American servitude and the advent of a new life of freedom; it renders the war an effort in emancipation above all else. A retelling of Southern Unionists' celebration of the Northern troops defines the third stanza: they "[weep] with joyful tears / When they [see] the honor'd flag they had not seen for years". A comedic tone is imbued in the fourth stanza, where the Confederates who had scoffed at Sherman's campaign or otherwise hoped to thwart Union efforts see themselves proven wrong. The final stanza celebrates the success of the march, after which "treason fled before [the Union troops] for resistance was in vain".

The historian Christian McWhirter evaluates the song's lyrical and thematic build:

On the surface, it celebrated Sherman's campaign from Atlanta to Savannah; but it also told listeners how to interpret Union victory. Speaking as a white soldier, Work turned the targeting of Confederate civilian property into a celebration of unionism and emancipation. Instead of destroyers, Union soldiers became deliverers for slaves and southern unionists. Georgia was not left in ruins but was converted into 'a thoroughfare for freedom.'

The music historian Kent A. Bowman recognizes "Marching Through Georgia" as one of the few songs narrating a whole campaign from start to end, as well as the sole Civil War campaign song by a major writer of war songs. As it "telescopes the action of the campaign", it just brushes through some reputed facts and overlooks specific battles, strategies, or soldiers, save for Sherman. It makes several errors and resorts to romantic garnishes, such as Southern Unionists crying with joy upon meeting the invading forces and "treason [fleeing]" the recaptured state. Most strikingly, Bowman writes, "Marching Through Georgia" ignores the pillaging and destruction wrought by Sherman's troops during the campaign; it is not known whether Work had heard of or agreed with these actions.

=== Musical analysis ===
"Marching Through Georgia" is in common time and in the key of B♭ major. It begins with a four-bar introduction which follows the chord progression B♭–E♭–B♭–F^{7}–B♭. Each verse and chorus is eight bars long. A soloist is intended to sing the individual stanzas, and a joint SATB choir accompanies the solo voice for the chorus. Work did not write any expression markings or dynamics throughout the song, save for a fortissimo marking at the start of the chorus. The original sheet music provides a piano accompaniment to be performed during the song. According to the writer Florine Thayer McCray, the song's "suggestive verse" and "swinging meter" evoke the enthusiasm felt by Union troops during the campaign.

=== General analysis ===
Like other pieces in Work's wartime catalog, "Marching Through Georgia" captures contemporary attitudes among Northern civilians—in this case, jubilation over Sherman's fruitful campaign. It fulfilled their demand for a celebratory patriotic hymn. The song imparts patriotic spirit, such that it "rubbed Yankee salt into one of the sorest wounds of the Civil War" in the musicologist Sigmund Spaeth's words. To soldiers, writes a postwar writer, Work's piece was the "only [one] which ... thoroughly expressed their triumphant enthusiasm".

"Marching Through Georgia" was one of the few wartime compositions to outlast the conflict. Civilians had grown tired of war, mirrored by the short-lasting fame of "Tramp! Tramp! Tramp!", an anthem well known among Northerners that nonetheless left the spotlight after 1865. In his autobiography published 26 years after Work drafted the song, George F. Root explains its unique postbellum popularity:

[It] is more played and sung at the present time than any other song of the war. This is not only on account of the intrinsic merit of its words and music, but because it is retrospective. Other war songs, 'The Battle Cry of Freedom' for example, were for exciting the patriotic feeling on going in to the war or the battle; 'Marching Through Georgia' is a glorious remembrance on coming triumphantly out, and so has been more appropriate to soldiers' and other gatherings ever since.

== Legacy ==
=== Reception and reputation ===
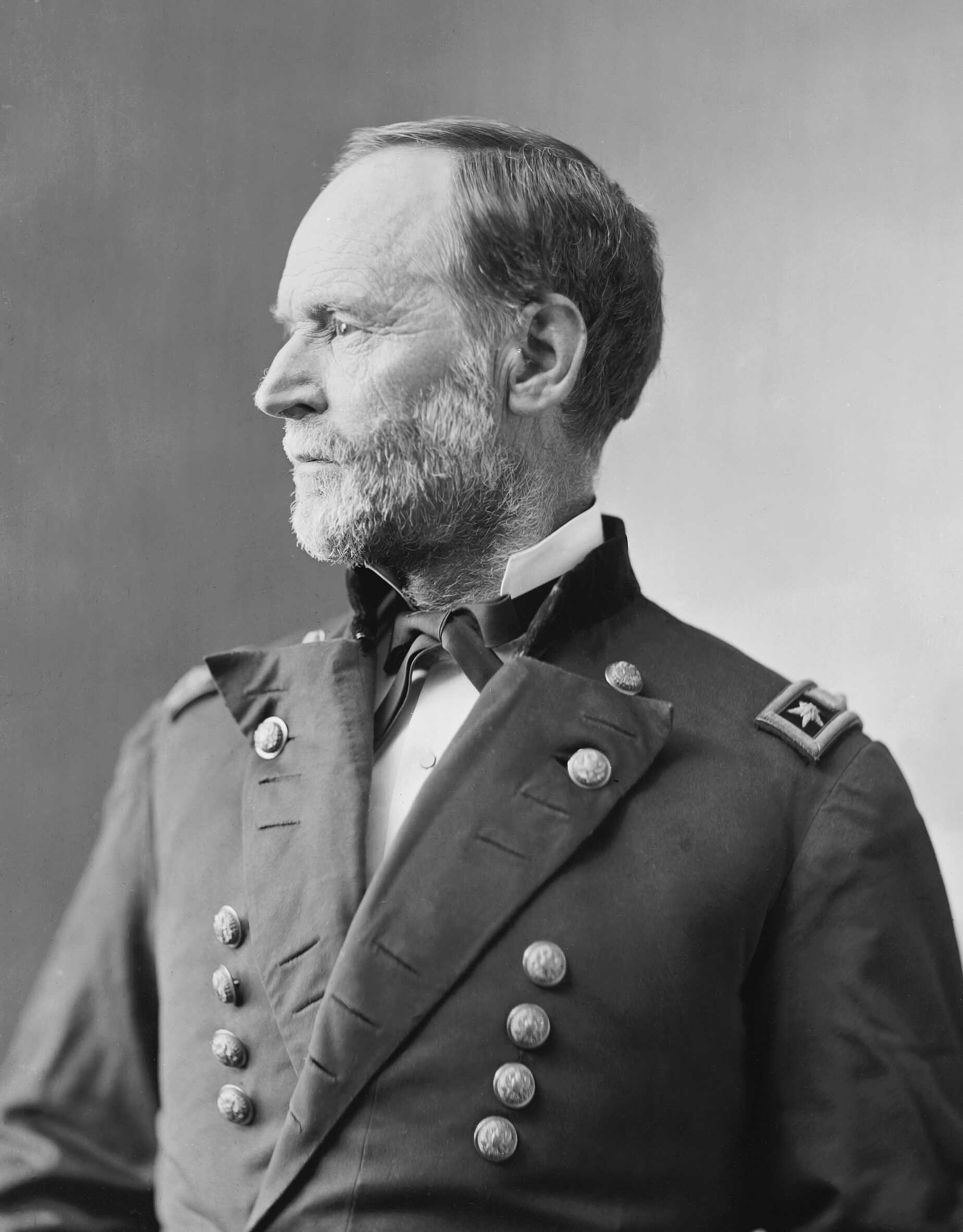
Maj. Gen. William T. Sherman, to whom "Marching Through Georgia" is dedicated

"Marching Through Georgia" cemented itself as a Civil War icon. It came to define the March to the Sea and became closely associated with Sherman. Selling 500,000 copies of sheet music within 12 years, it was one of the most successful wartime tunes and Work's most profitable hit up to that point. The music historian David Ewen (1962) regards it as "the greatest of his war songs", and Carl S. Lowden (1920) deems it his very best work, in part owing to its "soul-stirring" production and longevity. Work published one final war hymn in June, "'Tis Finished!, or Sing Hallelujah", that thankfully celebrates the bloody conflict's cessation and calls upon listeners to "sing the vict'ry won".

Edwin Tribble opines that Work's fame after the war, the little he had, rested on the popularity of "Marching Through Georgia", citing a letter he wrote to his long-time correspondent Susie Mitchell: "It is really surprising that I have excited so much curiosity and interest here [at an annual encampment of the Grand Army of the Republic (GAR)], not only among romantic young women but among all classes. My connection with 'Marching Through Georgia' seems to be the cause." (Note: In spite of this, Work would enjoy another major success in 1876 with "Grandfather's Clock".) Starting in the late nineteenth century, the song predominated at Northern veteran gatherings. Ewen agrees; he deems it "[the] song by which Work's name will always be associated".

Sherman himself came to loathe "Marching Through Georgia" because it was performed unremittingly at public functions he attended. (Note: Bowman does not mention the extent to which "Marching Through Georgia" was played at encampments but instead says that "Sherman's businesslike approach to war made him disdainful of any accolades for his work".) When he reviewed the national encampment of the GAR in 1890, the hundreds of bands present played the tune every time they passed him for an unbroken seven hours. Eyewitnesses say "his patience collapsed and he declared that he would never again attend another encampment until every band in the United States had signed an agreement not to play 'Marching Through Georgia' in his presence". (Note: Sherman reflected on his time at the encampment: "Scarcely had I gotten under way, however, when the strains of that infernal tune smote upon my ear.") Sherman maintained his promise for the rest of his life. However, the song was played at his funeral. Such was his vexation at Work's song that in 1890, he stated: "If I had thought when I made that march that it would have inspired anyone to compose such a piece, I would have marched around the state."

"Marching Through Georgia" has historically not shared the same popularity in the South. Irwin Silber, writing in 1995, deems it the most despised Unionist song in the region since it conjures up a devastated Georgia at the hands of Sherman's army. Accordingly, Sigmund Spaeth (1948) advises readers not to sing or play Work's composition to a Southerner. Three incidents at Democratic National Conventions illustrate Georgia's past contempt for the song. In the 1908 convention, Georgia was one of the few states not to send its delegates to the eventual victor William Jennings Bryan; the band present insultingly played "Marching Through Georgia" to sound the convention's disapproval. Eight years later, in 1916, the band accidentally started playing the song but stopped suddenly upon a warning from the presiding chair. A contemporary New York Times report remarked: "The only reason the band was not instantly shot was because of low visibility"; many southern delegates left in protest. A similar incident sparked yet again in 1924. When tasked to play a fitting song for the Georgia delegation, the convention's band broke into Work's piece. The historian John Tasker Howard remarks that "when the misguided leader, stronger on geography than history, swung into Marching Through Georgia, he was greeted by a silence that turned into hisses and boos noisier than the applause he had heard before".

However, the song enjoyed a far different reaction over fifty years later. The bluegrass musician David Pengelly performed it alongside "Dixie" before a Decatur, Georgia, audience in 1977; when he played "Dixie", the audience reacted lukewarmly, but "Marching Through Georgia" "immediately goaded [them] to clap along in unison". According to Carter W. Claiborne, bluegrass music had shed much of its Confederate sympathies by the late 1970s, in part because the South had been embraced in national popular culture and hence overrode its own past ties with the Confederacy. Confederate symbols and praise had also come to be deemed hateful.

=== Military and nationalist uses ===
The "Song of the Independence Army", originally sung by the Korean Independence Army in the 1910s, uses the tune of "Marching Through Georgia". This version is a modern guitar adaptation performed by Baekja.

In Bowman's words, "Marching Through Georgia"'s popularity "rapidly spread beyond America and the Civil War", and the historian David J. Eicher says it has become a "universal anthem". Armed forces across the world have performed it: Japanese troops sang "Marching Through Georgia" as they entered Port Arthur at the Russo–Japanese War's (1904–1905) onset, and British troops stationed in India during World War Two periodically chanted it. Moreover, its melody has been adapted into numerous regional military and nationalist anthems. The Princeton football fight song "Nassau! Nassau!" borrowed the melody, as did the controversial pro-Ulster hymn "Billy Boys", whose chorus goes:

Hello, hello, we are the Billy boys,
Hello, hello, you'll know us by our noise,
We're up to our knees in Fenian blood,
Surrender or you'll die,
For we are the Brigton Derry boys.

=== Political uses ===
Both major candidates in the 1896 U.S. presidential election, William McKinley and William Jennings Bryan, used songs sung to the tune of "Marching Through Georgia" in their campaign. The next Republican presidential candidate, Theodore Roosevelt, also borrowed its melody for political ends, along with the Populist Party, free silver campaigners, Prohibition activists, and the women's suffrage movement. The tune of "Paint 'Er Red", a pro-labor song of the Industrial Workers of the World, is based on "Marching Through Georgia". In the United Kingdom, the song lent the tune of future prime minister David Lloyd George's campaign song "George and Gladstone" as well as the liberal anthem, "The Land". The latter is a Georgist protest song calling for the fair distribution of land:

The land! the land! 'twas God who gave the land!
The land! the land! the ground on which we stand!
Why should we be beggars, with the ballot in our hand?
"God gave the land to the People!"

=== Other uses ===
Several films have employed Work's piece. Carpetbaggers in Gone with the Wind (1939) chant its chorus while trying to steal Tara from Scarlett O'Hara. The western Shane (1953) features the song, "making sport of a Rebel character", as the journalist David Ivey notes. "Marching Through Georgia" was additionally incorporated in Ken Burns' documentary The Civil War (1990) and Charles Ives' orchestral suite Three Places in New England.

== Bibliography ==
=== Books ===
- Bowman, Kent A. (1987). Voices of Combat: A Century of Liberty and War Songs, 1765–1865. Westport, Connecticut: Greenwood Press, Inc. ISBN 0-313-25408-7.
- Carder, P. H. (2008). George F. Root, Civil War Songwriter: A Biography. Jefferson, North Carolina: McFarland & Company, Inc. ISBN 978-0-7864-3374-2.
- Cregier, Don M. (1976). Bounder from Wales. Columbia, Missouri; London, England: University of Missouri Press. ISBN 0-8262-0203-9.
- Eicher, David J. (2001). The Longest Night: A Military History of the Civil War. New York City, New York: Simon & Schuster. ISBN 0-684-84944-5.
- Erbsen, Wayne (2000). Rousing Songs and True Tales of the Civil War. Pacific, Missouri: Mel Bay Publications. ISBN 978-1-883206-33-8.
- Ewen, David (1977). All the Years of American Popular Music. Englewood Cliffs, New Jersey: Prentice-Hall, Inc. ISBN 978-0-13-022442-2.
- Ewen, David (1962). Popular American Composers from Revolutionary Times to the Present: A Biographical and Critical Guide. New York City, New York: H. W. Wilson Company, Inc. ISBN 978-0824200404.
- Foner, Philip S. (1975). American Labor Songs of the Nineteenth Century. Chicago, Illinois: University of Illinois Press. ISBN 0-252-00187-7.
- Green, Archie; Roediger, David; Rosemont, Franklin; Salerno, Salvatore, eds. (2016). Big Red Songbook. Chicago, Illinois: Charles H. Kerr Publishing Company. ISBN 978-1-62963-129-5.
- Hattaway, Herman; Jones, Arthur (1991). How the North Won: A Military History of the Civil War (2 ed.). Chicago, Illinois: University of Illinois Press. ISBN 0-252-06210-8.
- Howard, John T. (1946). Our American Music: Three Hundred Years of It (3rd ed.). New York: Thomas Y. Crowell Company. OCLC 423103.
- Kelley, Bruce C.; Snell, Mark A. (2004). Bugle Resounding: Music and Musicians of the Civil War Era. Columbia, Missouri: University of Missouri Press. ISBN 0-8262-1538-6.
- Kennedy, Frances H., ed. (1998). The Civil War Battlefield Guide (2 ed.). Boston, Massachusetts: Houghton Mifflin. ISBN 978-0-395-74012-5.
- McWhirter, Christian (2012). Battle Hymns: The Power and Popularity of Music in the Civil War. Chapel Hill, North Carolina: University of North Carolina Press. ISBN 978-0-8078-3550-0.
- Root, George F. (1891). The Story of a Musical Life: An Autobiography by Geo F. Root. Cincinnati, Ohio: The John Church Co. ISBN 978-1-4047-8329-4.
- Sadie, Stanley; Tyrrell, John, eds. (2001). The New Grove Dictionary of Music and Musicians. Vol. 27 (6 ed.). New York City, New York: Macmillan Publishers. ISBN 1-56159-239-0.
- Silber, Irwin (1995). Songs of the Civil War. Mineola, New York: Dover Publications. ISBN 0-486-28438-7.
- Spaeth, Sigmund (1948). A History of Popular Music in America. New York City, New York: Random House.
- Work, Henry C. (n.d.). Work, Bertram G. (ed.). Songs of Henry Clay Work. New York City, New York: Little & Ives.

=== Studies and journals ===
- Birdseye, George (1879). "America's Song Composers: IV. Henry Clay Work". Potter's American Monthly. 12 (88): 284–288 – via Internet Archive.
- Claiborne, Carter W. (2021). "Analyzing the Interpretation of the Civil War in Bluegrass Music". Gettysburg College Journal of the Civil War Era. 11 (4): 1–37.
- Drago, Edmund L. (1973). "How Sherman's March Through Georgia Affected the Slaves". The Georgia Historical Quarterly. 57 (3): 361–375. JSTOR 40579903.
- Epstein, Dena J. (1944). "Music Publishing in Chicago before 1871: The Firm of Root & Cady, 1858-1871". Notes. 1 (4): 43–59. doi:10.2307/891291. JSTOR 891291.
- Harpine, William D. (2004). "'We Want Yer, McKinley': Epideictic Rhetoric in Songs from the 1896 Presidential Campaign". Rhetoric Society Quarterly. 34 (1): 73–88. doi:10.1080/02773940409391274. JSTOR 40232421.
- Hill, Richard S. (1953). "The Mysterious Chord of Henry Clay Work". Notes. 10 (2): 211–225. doi:10.2307/892874. JSTOR 892874.
- Rhodes, James Ford (1901). "Sherman's March to the Sea". The American Historical Review. 6 (3): 466–474. doi:10.2307/1833511. JSTOR 1833511.
- Sellers, James L. (1927). "The Economic Incidence of the Civil War in the South". The Mississippi Valley Historical Review. 14 (2): 179–191. doi:10.2307/1895946. JSTOR 1895946.
- Steinle, John (2008). "'Shall the People Rule?': Denver Hosts the Democrats, 1908". Colorado Heritage Magazine. 28 (3). Archived from the original on April 27, 2024 – via Colorado Encyclopedia.
- Tribble, Edwin (1967). "'Marching Through Georgia'". The Georgia Review. 21 (4): 423–429. JSTOR 41396391.

=== News articles ===
- Dolan, Tom (July 16, 1908). "News and Views of Things: 'Marching Through Georgia!'". The Jeffersonian. p. 13.
- Ivey, David. "War is Marching Our Way: The General Hated His Theme Song". The Fayetteville Observer.
- Jong-sul, Kwon (August 10, 2015). "유튜브 음악산책 25. '독립문의 자유종이 울릴 때까지'... 크라잉넛 '독립군가'". Voice of the People (in Korean).
- Lowden, Carl S. (August 7, 1920). "Stories of Old Home Songs: Marching Through Georgia". Dearborn Independent. p. 9.
- McCray, Florine Thayer (January 19, 1898). "About Henry Clay Work". New Haven Morning Journal and Courier. p. 10.
- Watson, J. D. (October 29, 1908). "Editorial Notes". The Jeffersonian. p. 12.
- "The Bitter Divide". BBC News. June 2, 1999. Archived from the original on November 1, 2025.
- "How Convention Woke Up.; Languid Over 'America' Until Glynn Struck Peace Keynote". The New York Times. June 15, 1916. p. 2.
- "Irish FA Bans 'Billy Boys' Song for Linfield Fans". BBC Sport. April 16, 2014. Archived from the original on November 1, 2025.
- "Stories Of Old Songs: Marching Through Georgia". Washington Standard. August 13, 1920. p. 6.

=== Websites ===
- Bailey, Anne J. (2020). "Sherman's March to the Sea". New Georgia Encyclopedia. Archived from the original on September 19, 2025.
- Davis, Stephen (2018). "Atlanta Campaign". New Georgia Encyclopedia. Archived from the original on October 10, 2025.
- Marzalek, John F. (2021). "Sherman's March to the Sea". American Battlefield Trust. Archived from the original on October 8, 2025.
- Tome, Vanessa P. (2021). "'Marching Through Georgia'". New Georgia Encyclopedia. Archived from the original on August 8, 2025.
- Webster, Ian (June 10, 2026). "Inflation Calculator". CPI Inflation Calculator. Archived from the original on July 4, 2026.
- Whitehead, Andrew (May 1, 2011). "God Gave the Land to the People: The Liberal 'Land Song'". History Workshop. Archived from the original on September 30, 2025.
