= Kingdom Coming =

American Civil War song by Henry Clay Work

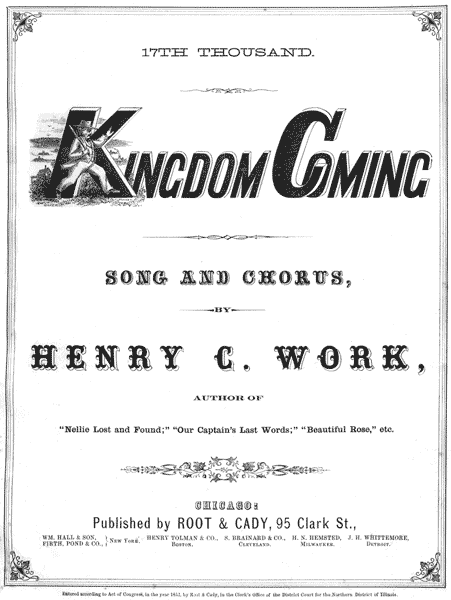
The original 1862 sheet music cover by Root & Cady.

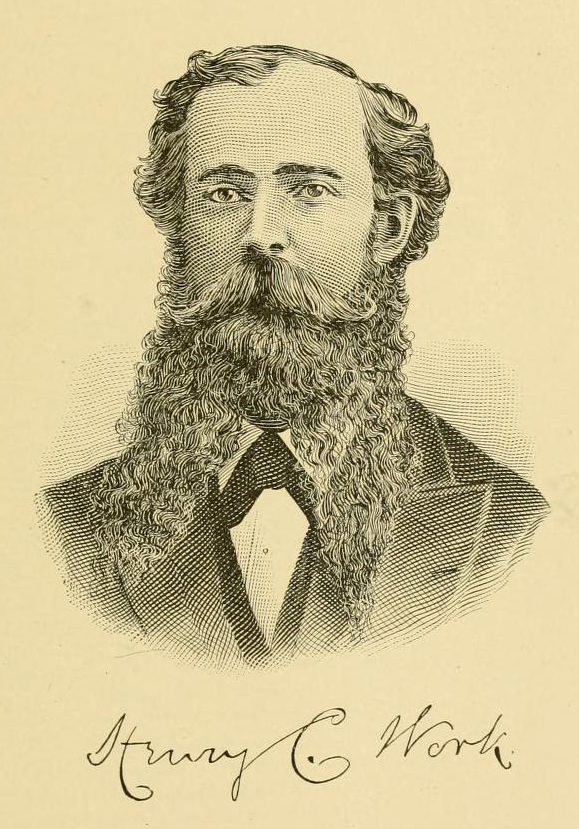
The composer Henry Clay Work in a W. S. B. Matthews engraving.

"Kingdom Coming", or "The Year of Jubilo", is an American Civil War-era song written and composed by Henry Clay Work (1832–1884) in 1861. It was published by Root & Cady in 1862 and first advertised in April by the minstrel group Christy's Minstrels. Narrated by black slaves on a Confederate plantation, "Kingdom Coming" recounts their impending freedom after their master disguises himself as a contraband and flees to avoid being captured by Union troops. It is a minstrel song, written in African American Vernacular English, spoken by slaves, and intended to be performed by blackface troupes.

Work was an avowed abolitionist and composed numerous pro-Union songs during the Civil War such as "Marching Through Georgia" (1865) and "Babylon is Fallen" (1863)—the sequel to "Kingdom Coming". The song portended the then-President Abraham Lincoln's issuing of the Emancipation Proclamation in 1863, an executive order liberating all slaves in Confederate-held territory.

"Kingdom Coming" was one of the most successful Union songs, renowned as a favorite among black Unionists and minstrel troupes. It amassed sheet music sales of 75,000 copies. The publisher George Frederick Root claimed that it was his firm's most successful piece "for nearly a year and a half" and "the most successful patriotic song in the West."

== Background ==
=== Work as a songwriter ===
Henry Clay Work arose from a "staunch abolitionist" family. His father, Alanson, aided thousands of fugitives attain freedom through the Underground Railroad, on which his house was situated. Work spent much of his childhood among the freedmen and gradually learned their dialect and modes of entertainment. He actively heard their harrowing recollections of plantation life before absconding the South. These left a stirring impression on him; throughout the rest of his days, he remained deeply moved by the plight of African Americans. As an adult, Work would crusade for abolitionism by communicating the routine agonies of slave life through music. In fact, author Florine Thayer McCray remarks that many of his compositions evoke "the very atmosphere of awakening plantation life" and echo "the cottonpicker's musing hum and the roustabout's refrain."

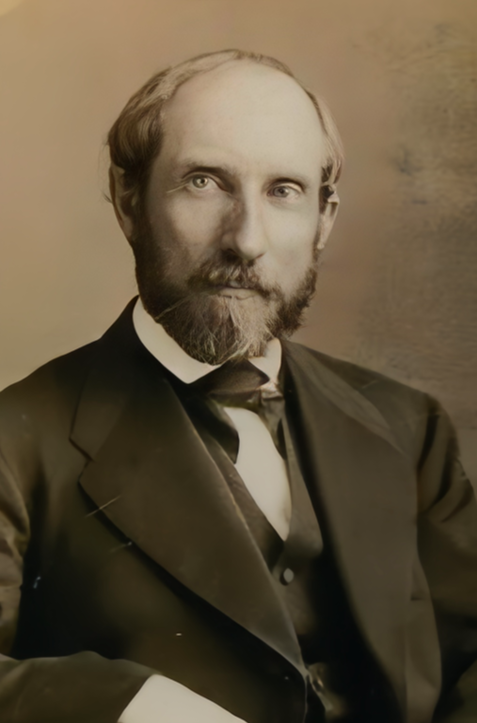
George F. Root in 1868, who Work collaborated with throughout the Civil War.

After the family was forced to migrate away from the railroad, he started laboring as a music typesetter, first in his native Connecticut and, from 1855 onward, in Chicago. While Work did not mind his trade, his true passion and "everyday thought" was song. The American Civil War's outbreak in April 1861 provided these aspirations a suitable breeding ground. Music was the definitive propaganda tool to raise morale among troops. This called for the enlistment of passionate abolitionists into the songwriting industry. Seeking to advance his pastime into a full-time occupation, as well as to contribute to the Union cause, Work hiked up his songwriting efforts.

A resident Chicagoan, he was drawn to local publishing firm Root & Cady, the "most prolific producers of wartime music." Their collaboration proved one of the most fruitful in the war, during which the firm attained nigh unparalleled success. Work established himself as one of the Union's national composers whose music "captured the spirit and struggle of the Civil War." His catalog of 27 patriotic songs issued from 1861 to 1865 includes seriocomedies, overviews of army life, commemorations of Northern triumphs and, uniquely, depictions of African Americans' struggles in the South.

=== African-American music of the Civil War ===
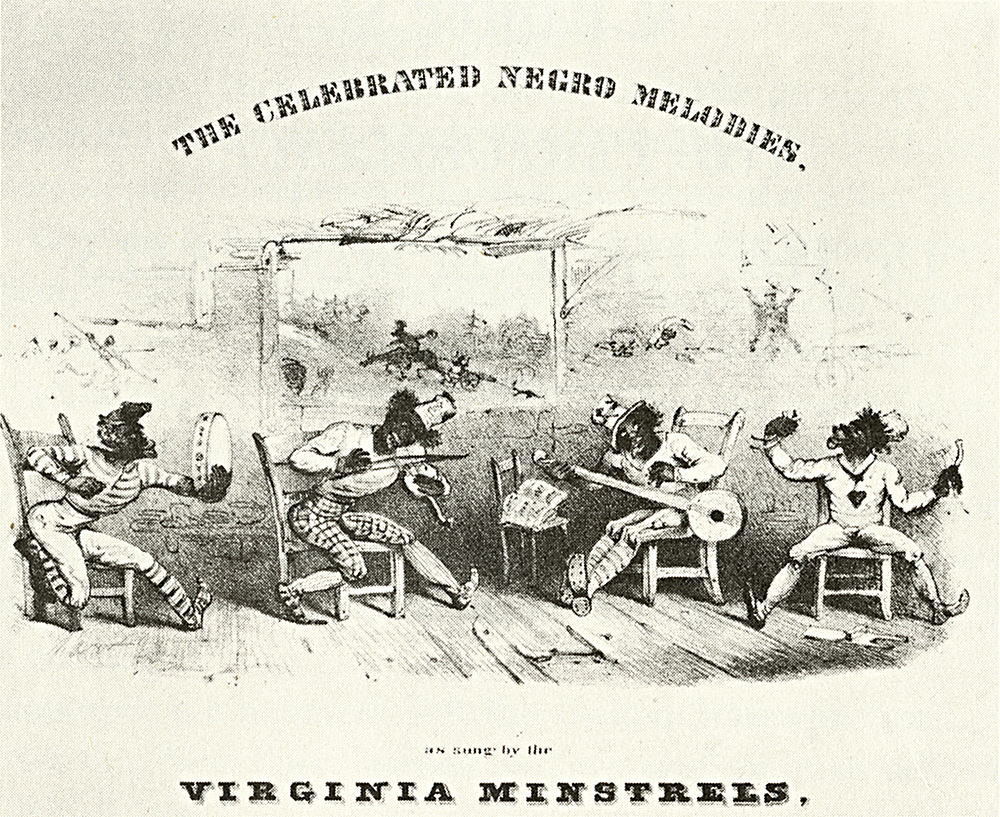
The Virginia Minstrels in the 1840s, a pioneering minstrel troupe led by Dan Emmett.

Ever since the 1830s lower-class Northern theater had been dominated by troupes of blackface performers. Dressed in extravagant costumes and armed with banjos, they acted as caricatured African Americans reminiscing about their days in the agrarian South. The Romantic portrayal of Southern plantation life, with slaves and their owners residing harmoniously, gave uninformed Northern audiences a false impression of African Americans' toil in an era when slavery was growing into a dangerously divisive political issue. Stephen Foster idealized the South in his early compositions; "Massa's in de Cold, Cold Ground" (1852), featuring slaves lamenting their "kind" master's death, provides a clear example:

Massa made de darkeys love him,
Cause he was so kind,
Now dey sadly weep above him,
Mourning cause he leave them behind.
I cannot work before tomorrow,
Cause de teardrops flow,
I try to drive away my sorrow
Pickin' on de old banjo.

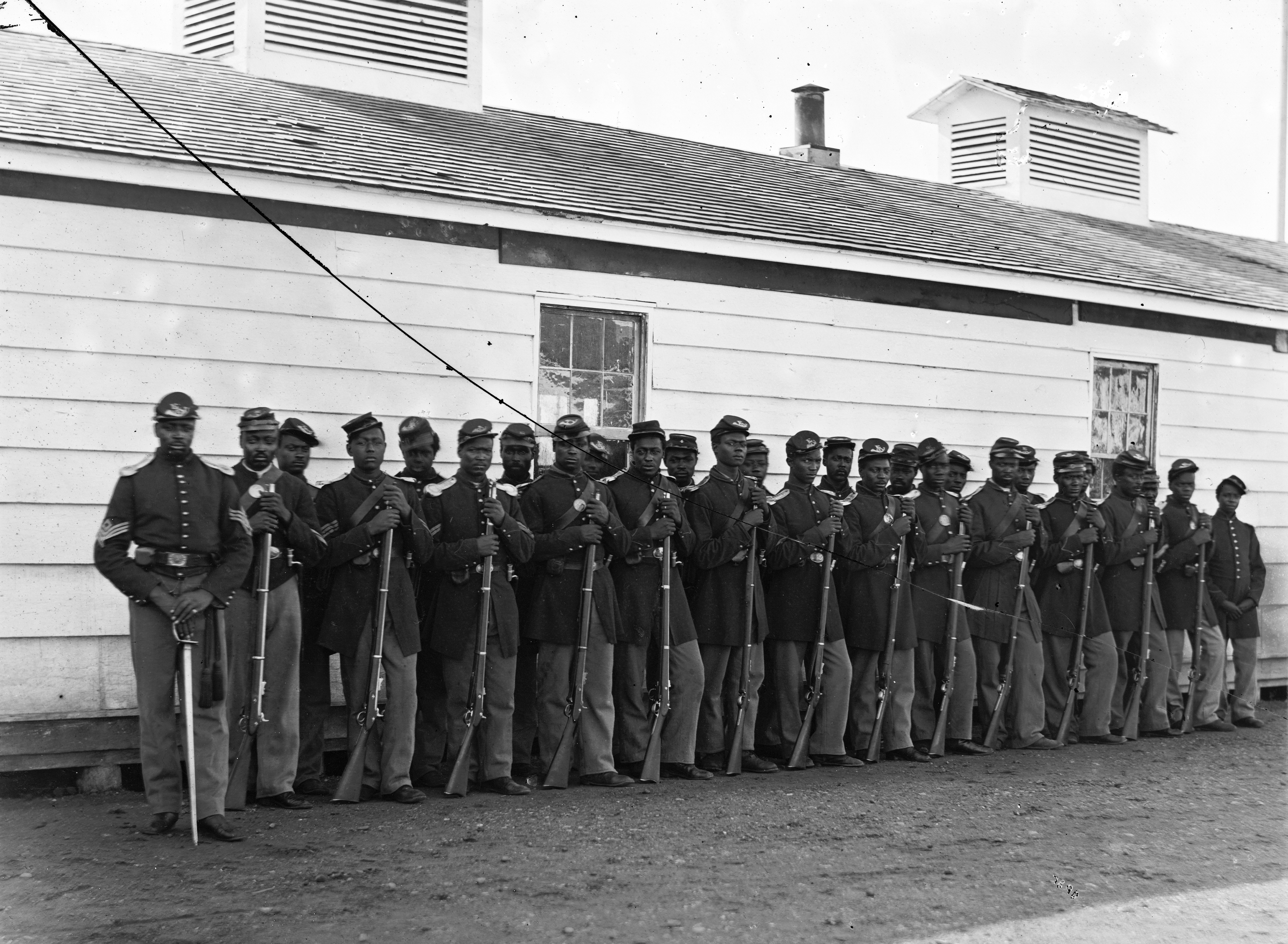
The 4th Colored Regiment of the U.S. Colored Troops Infantry.

With African Americans stereotyped as blithe, docile servants, racism pervaded Northern society and shaped public attitudes. "Kingdom Coming" strays from the mockery of blackface minstrelsy, portraying a realistic picture of plantation life and humanizing slaves. Instead of the oppressive master reigning supreme over his subjects as generally observed in minstrel songs, these roles are inverted; the slaves take over the plantation and overcome their overseer. This role reversal is also observed in "Babylon is Fallen" (1863), in which the slaves exclaim: "We will be de Massa, / He will be de servant."

Prior to the Civil War, slaves turned to simple, sometimes comic, songs to lighten their labor. However, from 1861 onward African-American music took a new serious form, serving as a collective call for liberation. Negro spirituals such as "Go Down Moses", alluding to Israel's journey to freedom in the promised land in Exodus, consoled stifled African-American populations and rallied support for emancipation. Music was to remedy this dispirited attitude, rallying both White and Black soldiers around a collective struggle for liberty. Work spent innumerable hours among freedmen and gradually learned their dialect, which would later enhance his songwriting capability. His exposure to minstrelsy and African American performers also influenced his writing style and its authenticity to slaves' lifestyle and concerns.

=== The Emancipation Proclamation ===
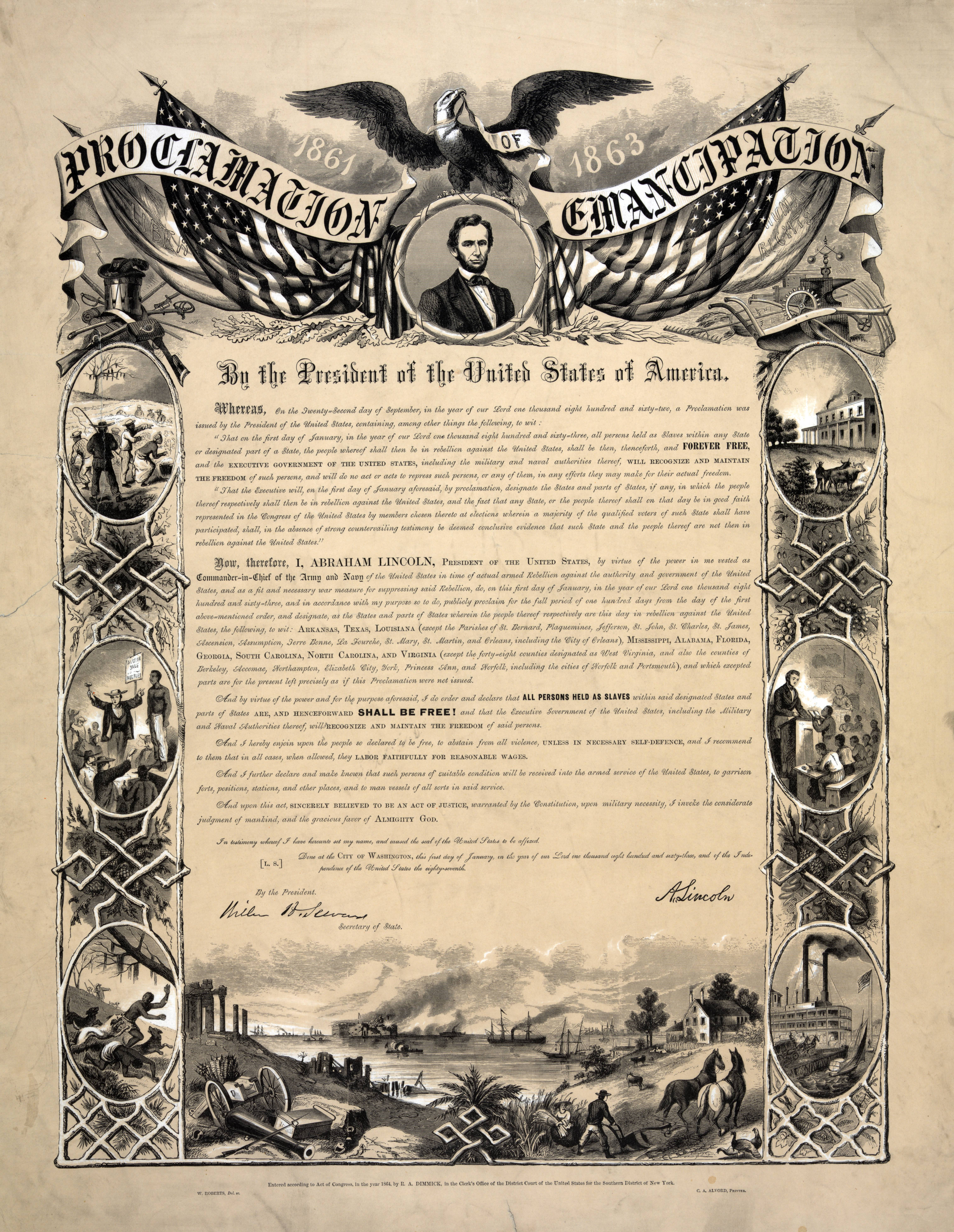
An 1864 reproduction of the Emancipation Proclamation by W. Roberts.

The storyline of "Kingdom Coming" portends the Emancipation Proclamation, an executive order issued in January 1863 by President Abraham Lincoln. It mandated that:

all persons held as slaves within any State or designated part of a State, the people whereof shall then be in rebellion against the United States, shall be then, thenceforward, and forever free; and the Executive Government of the United States, including the military and naval authority thereof, will recognize and maintain the freedom of such persons, and will do no act or acts to repress such persons, or any of them, in any efforts they may make for their actual freedom.

Root, along with other Illinoisan Unionists prominently appealed to President Lincoln to issue a degree of emancipation. After the Emancipation Proclamation was issued, on September 27, 1862, approximately 10,000 Chicagoans, accompanied by several musical societies such as Root & Cady, gathered at Bryan Hall and Court House Square to celebrate the occasion. "Kingdom Coming", which symbolized the proclamation's outcome, was one of the tunes chanted by the crowd.

== Lyrical analysis ==
The song is pro-Unionist, and the lyrics are sung from the point of view of slaves ("de darkeys") in Confederate territory, who celebrate their impending freedom after their master flees the approach of Union military forces. The primary persona is a "hypocritical and cowardly" slave owner ("de massa"). They speculate on the future fate of the owner, whom they suspect will pretend to be a runaway slave in order to avoid capture. With their owner absent, the slaves revolt, locking their overseer in a cellar as retribution for his harsh treatment toward them. The slaves then celebrate their impending emancipation by Union soldiers by drinking their absent owner's cider and wine in his kitchen.

Say, darkeys, hab you seen de massa,
Wid de muffstash on his face,
Go long de road some time dis mornin',
Like he gwine to leab de place?
He seen a smoke, way up de ribber,
Whar de Linkum gumboats lay;
He took his hat, an' lef' berry sudden,
An' I spec he's run away!

— first stanza

Say, darkeys, have you seen the master,
With the mustache on his face,
Go long the road some time this mornin',
Like he's going to leave the place?
He's seen a smoke way up the river,
Where the Lincoln gunboats lay;
He took his hat and left very sudden,
And I expect he ran away!

— Standard English translation

Say, darkeys, hab you seen: the song is positioned as a single narrator/singer addressing a group of slaves. However, the dialect indicates that the narrator is also a slave, and the rest of the song indicates that the narrator is also present on the plantation. Is the narrator removed in some way from the audience? The third stanza in particular refers to the "darkeys" as "they" rather than "we." Some modern renditions (e.g. Pete Seeger's) replace "darkeys" with "brothers" or even "comrades," indicating group identification, while Bobby Horton's rendition uses "black folks" instead, leaving the ambiguity as to identification in place.

de massa, wid the muffstash on his face: there is no indication anywhere in the song that there is more than one master. Therefore, the inclusion of a reference to the master's mustache indicates that he does not normally wear one. The mustache may be fake (though in this case, why "the" instead of "a"?), or it may have been (hastily?) grown for the occasion.

he seen a smoke, way up the ribber, whar de Linkum gumboats lay: suggesting a nearby battle between Union and Confederate forces, though whether this was precipitated by the arrival or the gunboats, or of challenging Confederate forces, or some other reason, is not clear.

De massa run? ha! ha!
De darkey stay? ho! ho!
It mus' be now de kingdom comin',
An' de year ob Jubilo!

— chorus

The master ran? ha! ha!
The darkey stays? ho! ho!
It must be now the kingdom's comin'
And the year of Jubilo!

— Standard English translation

De massa run . . . de darkey stay: pointing out the total inversion of the normal order of things, where the master rules over his plantation and the slaves run away in pursuit of freedom elsewhere. For the narrator and his audience, the world has turned upside down.

de kingdom comin': the Kingdom of God, God's direct rule on Earth, whose advent is prophesied by Jesus Christ as narrated in the Christian Gospels, when all wrongs will be righted and everything placed in proper order.

de year ob Jubilo: the "year of Jubilo [Jubilee]" alludes to the biblical practice of freeing bondsmen every 50 years (delineated in Leviticus 25, OT), a lasting metaphor of liberation from oppression; to subordinated Blacks, it represents the end of their servitude. The scripture reads: "The fiftieth year shall be a jubilee for you; do not sow and do not reap what grows of itself or harvest the untended vines. For it is a jubilee and is to be holy for you; eat only what is taken directly from the fields." The law "continues to stimulate models for liberation from oppressive forces, for reconciliation, and for new beginnings". To subjugated Blacks it symbolized the end of their servitude.

He six foot one way, two feet tudder,
An' he weigh three hundred pound,
His coat so big, he couldn’t pay de tailor,
An’ it won’t go half way round.
He drill so much, dey call him Cap’an,
An’ he get so drefful tanned,
I spec’ he try an’ fool dem Yankees
For to tink he’s contraband.

— second stanza

He's six foot one way, two feet the other,
And he weights three hundred pounds,
His coat's so big, he couldn't pay the tailor,
And it won't go half way round.
He drills so much, they call him Cap'n,
And he gets so dreadful tanned,
I expect he'll try and fool them Yankees,
For to think he's contraband.

— Standard English translation

(analysis of the second stanza)

De darkeys feel so lonesome
libing in de loghouse on de lawn,
Dey move dar tings to massa’s parlor,
For to keep it while he’s gone,
Dar's wine an’ cider in de kitchen,
An’ de darkeys dey’ll hab some;
I spose dey’ll all be cornfiscated
When de Linkum sojers come.

— third stanza

The darkeys feel so lonesome
living in the log house on the lawn,
They move their things to master's parlor,
For to keep it while he's gone,
There's wine and cider in the kitchen,
And the darkeys they'll have some;
I suppose they'll all be confiscated,
When the Lincoln soldiers come.

— Standard English translation

(analysis of the third stanza)

De oberseer he make us trouble,
An' he dribe us round a spell,
We lock him up in the smoke house cellar
Wid de key trown in de well.
De whip is lost, de han'cuff broken,
But de massa'll hab his pay,
He's ole enough, big enough, ought to know better
Dan to went an' run away!

— fourth stanza

The overseer he makes us trouble,
And he drives us round a spell,
We lock him up in the smoke house cellar
With the key thrown in the well.
The whip is lost, the handcuff's broken,
But the master'll have his pay,
He's old enough, big enough, ought to known better
Than to go and run away!

— Standard English translation

(analysis of the fourth stanza)

== Legacy ==
=== In the Civil War ===
1927 phonographic recording by Frank Crumit.

Root embarked on a pervasive advertising campaign to promote his compositions. "Kingdom Coming" was his first major song supporting this cause, published by Root in 1862. "Kingdom Coming" was first advertised by Christy's Minstrels in April 1862, and became instantly successful and a staple of any minstrel show's repertoire. Its sheet music sold 75,000 copies. Root & Cady reportedly could not keep up with orders for the song, with the publisher claiming: "It is whistled, sung, hummed and instrumentalized everywhere, in fact it is one of the institutions of the day." It was a favorite among African American troops. It was reportedly as popular as "Dixie's Land" during the war and subsequent years. A writer for the Hartford Courant gazette observed:

Our country has produced few songwriters whose works have been more widely sung than Mr. Work. Some of his productions have not only been on the lips of nearly every man, women and child in America, but with some variations, in every part of the world. There is scarcely a Grand Army gathering where his songs are not sung, and they are to be sung for generations to come.

First advertised by Edwin P. Christy in April 1862, "Kingdom Coming" quickly became a linchpin of minstrel show repertoires. Convinced of its potential, the publisher George F. Root embarked on a widespread advertising campaign to promote the song. Such was its success that Root could not keep up with orders, claiming it to be his firm's most profitable composition "for nearly a year and a half" and "the most successful patriotic song in the West." Within a few years, it sold 75,000 copies of sheet music. After the Emancipation Proclamation was issued, approximately 10,000 Chicagoans gathered at Clark Street to celebrate the occasion; "Kingdom Coming", symbolizing the proclamation's outcome, was one of the abolitionist songs chanted alongside "John Brown's Body". While time has not been kind with the song, up until the 19th century's close, it was reportedly as popular as "Dixie". Jerome Kern's 1921 Broadway musical Good Morning, Dearie and the 1944 film Meet Me in St. Louis prominently feature it.

=== The sequel "Babylon is Fallen" ===
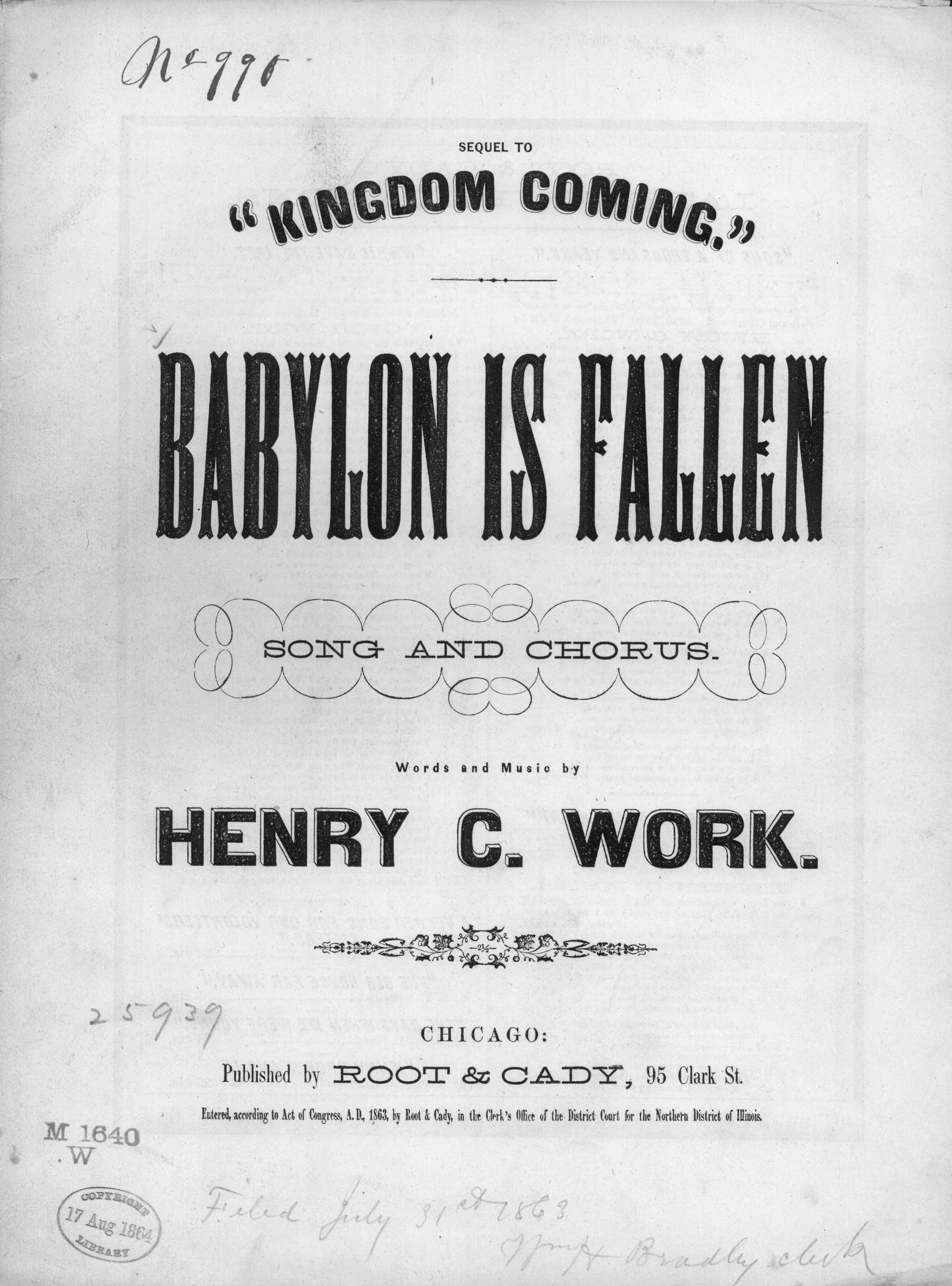
The original 1863 sheet music cover of "Babylon is Fallen".

Due to the success of "Kingdom Coming", Work penned a sequel titled "Babylon is Fallen", in which the "massa" who "went and run away" enlisted in the Confederate Army. He was discovered by his former slaves and imprisoned. The title alludes to the Book of Revelation of the New Testament: "Fallen, fallen is Babylon the great" (14:8), referring to the downfall of despotism, appropriate for the slave master's demise.

=== In popular culture ===
The tune to "Kingdom Coming" features in several cartoons. Metro-Goldwyn-Mayer made use of it in The Three Little Pups, (with Droopy) and Billy Boy, as well as in Michael Lah's Blackboard Jumble and Sheep Wrecked. The piece is whistled throughout all four pictures by a dimwitted wolf character voiced by Daws Butler (using the same slow Southern drawl he would later employ for Huckleberry Hound). This wolf character has no official name, but is commonly referred to as "Jubilo Wolf", in reference to "Year of Jubilo". It also occasionally appears in Warner Bros. cartoons, such as being used throughout the 1938 Porky Pig cartoon Injun Trouble and its 1945 remake Wagon Heels, and the closing scenes of the 1945 Bugs Bunny cartoons The Unruly Hare and Hare Trigger.

Some films exercise it. In Too Busy to Work (1932) Will Rogers (as Jubilo) sings it along with costar Marian Nixon. In The Telegraph Trail (1933), John Trent (John Wayne) whistles this tune. It is instrumental background music in The Horse Soldiers (1959) (also starring Wayne). In Meet Me in St. Louis (1944), Esther Smith (Judy Garland) sings new lyrics, written for the movie, to the tune of "Year of Jubilo". The lyrics are in standard English and are inoffensive, with no reference to slavery, the Civil War, or any other controversial subject.

== Bibliography ==
=== Primary sources ===
- Foster, Stephen C. (1852). Massa's in de Cold, Cold Ground. New York City, New York: Firth, Pond & Co – via Google Books.
- Root, George F. (1891). The Story of a Musical Life: An Autobiography by Geo F. Root. Cincinnati, Ohio: The John Church Co. ISBN 978-1-4047-8329-4.
- Root, George F.; Sawyer, Charles C.; Work, Henry C., eds. (1892). Our National War Songs (2nd ed.). Chicago: The S. Brainard's Sons Co.
- Work, Henry C. (1884). Work, Bertram G. (ed.). Songs of Henry Clay Work. New York City: Little & Ives.

=== Secondary sources ===
- Bailey, Guy; Maynor, Natalie; Cukor-Avila, Patricia, eds. (1991). The Emergence of Black English: Text and Commentary. Philadelphia, Pennsylvania: John Benjamins Publishing Company. ISBN 1-55619-161-8.
- Carder, P. H. (2008). George F. Root, Civil War Songwriter: A Biography. Jefferson, North Carolina: McFarland & Company, Inc. ISBN 978-0-7864-3374-2.
- Carmichael, Calum M. (2006). Illuminating Leviticus: A Study of Its Laws and Institutions in the Light of Biblical Narratives. Baltimore, Maryland: Johns Hopkins University Press. ISBN 0-8018-8500-0.
- Cohen, Michael C. (2015). The Social Lives of Poems in Nineteenth-Century America. Philadelphia: The University of Pennsylvania Press. ISBN 978-0-8122-4708-4.
- Drury, John (1975). Old Chicago Houses. Chicago: University of Chicago Press. ISBN 0-226-16555-8.
- Ewen, David (1962). Popular American Composers from Revolutionary Times to the Present: A Biographical and Critical Guide. New York: H. W. Wilson Company, Inc. ISBN 978-0824200404.
- Finson, Jon W. (1994). The Voices That Are Gone: Themes in Nineteenth-Century American Popular Song. New York: Oxford University Press. ISBN 0-19-505750-3.
- Floyd, Samuel A. (1995). The Power of Black Music: Interpreting Its History from Africa to the United States. New York: Oxford University Press. ISBN 0-19-508235-4.
- Herder, Ronald (1998). 500 Best-Loved Song Lyrics. Mineola, NY: Dover Publications, Inc. ISBN 0-486-29725-X.
- Howard, John Tasker; Bellows, George Kent (1967). A Short History of Music in America. New York: McFarland & Company, Inc. ISBN 0-8152-0162-1.
- Hursh, David; Goertzen, Chris (2009). Good Medicine and Good Music: A Biography of Mrs. Joe Person, Patent Remedy Entrepreneur and Musician, Including the Complete Text of Her 1903 Autobiography. Jefferson, NC: McFarland & Co., Inc. ISBN 978-0-7864-3459-6.
- Kelley, Bruce C.; Snell, Mark A. (2004). Bugle Resounding: Music and Musicians of the Civil War Era. Columbia: University of Missouri Press. ISBN 0-8262-1538-6.
- McWhirter, Christian (2012). Battle Hymns: The Power and Popularity of Music in the Civil War. Chapel Hill: University of North Carolina Press. ISBN 978-0-8078-3550-0.
- Shepherd, John, ed. (2003). Continuum Encyclopedia of Popular Music of the World. Vol. 1. New York: Continuum International Publishing Group. ISBN 0-8264-6321-5.
- Silber, Irwin (1995). Songs of the Civil War. Mineola, NY: Dover Publications. ISBN 0-486-28438-7.

=== Studies and journals ===
- Birdseye, George (1879). "America's Song Composers: IV. Henry Clay Work". Potter's American Monthly. 12 (88): 284–288 – via Internet Archive.
- Epstein, Dena J. (1944). "Music Publishing in Chicago before 1871: The Firm of Root & Cady, 1858–1871". Notes. 1 (4): 43–59. doi:10.2307/891291. JSTOR 891291.
- Epstein, Dena J. (1945). "Music Publishing in Chicago before 1871, Chapter VI. the End of the Firm, 1868–1871". Notes. 3 (1): 80–98, 101–109. doi:10.2307/891291. JSTOR 891291.
- Hill, Richard S. (1953). "The Mysterious Chord of Henry Clay Work". Notes. 10 (2): 211–225. doi:10.2307/892874. JSTOR 892874.
- Hill, Richard S. (1953). "The Mysterious Chord of Henry Clay Work (Conclusion)". Notes. 10 (3): 367–390. doi:10.2307/892162. JSTOR 892162.
- Sussman, Rachel (2001). "The Carnavalizing of Race". Etnofoor. 14 (2): 79–88. JSTOR 41396391.
- Tribble, Edwin (1967). "Marching Through Georgia". The Georgia Review. 21 (4): 423–429. JSTOR 41396391.

=== Newspaper articles ===
- McCray, Florine Thayer (January 19, 1898). "About Henry Clay Work". New Haven Morning Journal and Courier. p. 10.
- "Hawk-Eyetems". The Willimantic Journal. February 28, 1879. p. 7.
- "Henry C. Work: A Popular Song Writer, and His Method of Composing". Evening Star. May 28, 1881. p. 3.
- "Henry Clay Work: The Famous Song Writer Ends His Life in Hartford". New Haven Morning Journal and Courier. June 10, 1884. p. 2.
- "Herald Notes". The Morning Herald. November 4, 1878. p. 3.
- "Items of Interest". Narragansett Herald. April 12, 1879. p. 1.
- "Music in the West: History of Chicago's Progress in the Divine Art". Chicago Tribune. December 18, 1892 – via Chicagology.
- "Musical Affair". The Manitowoc Tribune. May 9, 1867. p. 2.
- "My Grandfather's Clock: A Song that was Suddenly Made Popular – Henry C. Work's Melodies". San Marcos Free Press. January 25, 1879. p. 3.
- "Page 2". Evening Capital. July 18, 1884. p. 2.
- "Stories Of Old Songs: Marching Through Georgia". Washington Standard. August 13, 1920. p. 6.
- "Songs for the Million". The Saturday Evening Post. April 12, 1862. p. 4.
- "The Author of 'Grandfather's Clock'". The Farmer and Mechanic. Vol. 3, no. 7. November 28, 1878. p. 3.
- "The City: Geo. F. Root". Chicago Tribune. May 10, 1864. p. 4.

=== Websites ===
- "African-American Soldiers During the Civil War". Library of Congress.
- "Henry C. Work". Songwriters Hall of Fame.
- "Henry Clay Work". Song of America.
- Nelson, Dean (2008). "Marching with Henry C. Work". Museum of Connecticut History.
- "The Emancipation Proclamation". National Archives. January 28, 2022.
- "The Upshot Family, a Serio-comic Poem (Paperback)". Walmart.
