= My Grandfather's Clock =

1876 song by Henry Clay Work

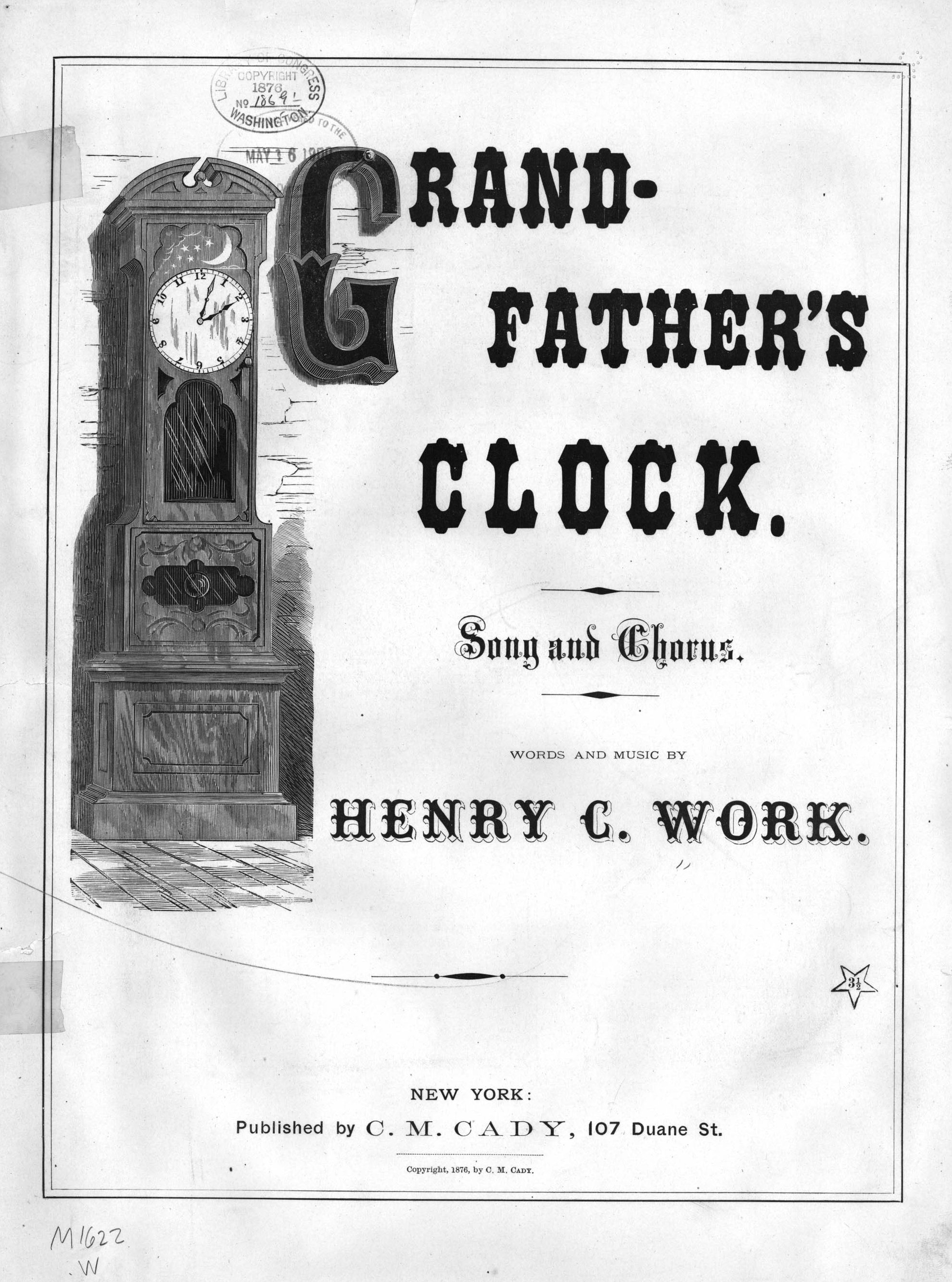
1876 sheet music cover, published by Chauncey M. Cady

"My Grandfather's Clock" (also known as "Grandfather's Clock") is a popular song by Henry Clay Work published in 1876.

== Background ==
With the American Civil War over, Henry Clay Work's motivation for songwriting and musical output declined considerably. Turning away from patriotic songs, he settled into sentimental balladry. In the fall of 1871, Root & Cady's firm burnt down in the Great Chicago Fire. This withered any possibility of Work returning to songwriting soon; from 1873 until 1876, he published no music. His life became mangled by boredom and depression; in an 1875 letter, he wrote: "I am no longer a printer—am now a proof-reader. Nothing to do all day, but to read and criticize, find fault or mark errors ... ." Only printing, the career he held since youth, and attendance at local church services absorbed him. In 1876, Chauncey M. Cady chanced to encounter Work while strolling in Broadway and, sensing a lucrative opportunity, offered him a post at his business. Eager to pick up songwriting once again, Work accepted; he published nine songs for Cady from 1876 to 1879, ending his retirement. Throughout this time, he also wrote for John Church & Co., William A. Pond & Co., and Root's firm.

The scholars Dale Cockrell and Andrew M. Zinck observe that American popular music matured in the fifteen years following the Civil War; songs, often written to be performed at home, were generally "stylized" and cemented the values of the middle class.

== Original lyrics and melody ==
According to the collection of songs compiled by Work's nephew after his death, titled Songs:

My grand-father's clock was too large for the shelf,
So it stood ninety years on the floor;
It was taller by half than the old man himself,
Though it weighed not a pennyweight more.
It was bought on the morn of the day that he was born,
And was always his treasure and pride;
But it stopp'd short never to go again
When the old man died.
Chorus:
Ninety years, without slumbering (tick, tick, tick, tick)
His life seconds numbering (tick, tick, tick, tick)
It stopp'd short never to go again
When the old man died.

In watching its pendulum swing to and fro,
Many hours had he spent while a boy;
And in childhood and manhood the clock seemed to know
And to share both his grief and his joy.
For it struck twenty-four when he entered at the door,
With a blooming and beautiful bride;
But it stopp'd short never to go again
When the old man died.
(Chorus)

My grandfather said that of those he could hire,
Not a servant so faithful he found;
For it wasted no time, and had but one desire—
At the close of each week to be wound.
And it kept in its place—not a frown upon its face,
And its hands never hung by its side;
But it stopp'd short never to go again
When the old man died.
(Chorus)

It rang an alarm in the dead of the night—
An alarm that for years had been dumb;
And we knew that his spirit was pluming for flight—
That his hour of departure had come.
Still the clock kept the time, with a soft and muffled chime,
As we silently stood by his side;
But it stopp'd short never to go again
When the old man died.
(Chorus)

== Composition ==
=== Lyrics ===
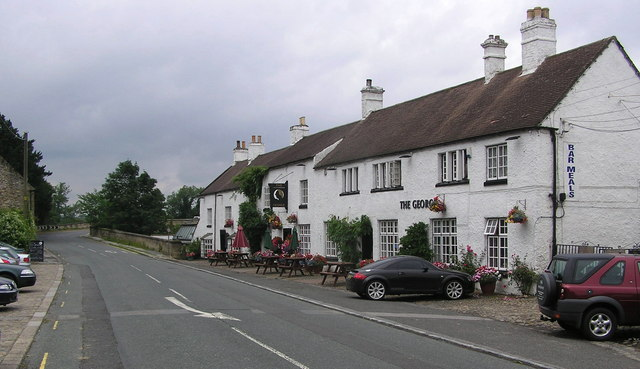
George of Piercebridge hotel in Piercebridge, England, seen in 2006

The song, told from a grandchild's point of view, is about his grandfather's clock. The clock is purchased on the morning of the grandfather's birth and works perfectly for ninety years, requiring only that it be wound at the end of each week. The clock seems to know the good and bad events in the grandfather's life; it rings twenty-four chimes when the grandfather brings his new wife into his home, and near his death it rings an alarm, which the family recognizes to mean that the elderly gentleman is near death and gathers by his bed. After the grandfather dies, the clock suddenly stops, and never works again.

Inspired by his sympathetic approach to disaffected individuals, he anthropomorphizes a clock to signify its owner; it had stood for ninety years throughout the old man's life and accompanied him. When he dies, the clock also stops functioning, a symbol of human mortality and irreplaceable companionship. The song remains most memorable for its onomatopoeic "ticking" chorus and effortlessly inventive rhymes: "Ninety years without slumbering ... / His life seconds numbering."

Work dedicated the song to his sister Lissie.

=== Music ===
It is in common time, and the original sheet music indicates the key of B-flat major. It begins with a four-bar instrumental opening.

== Release and legacy ==
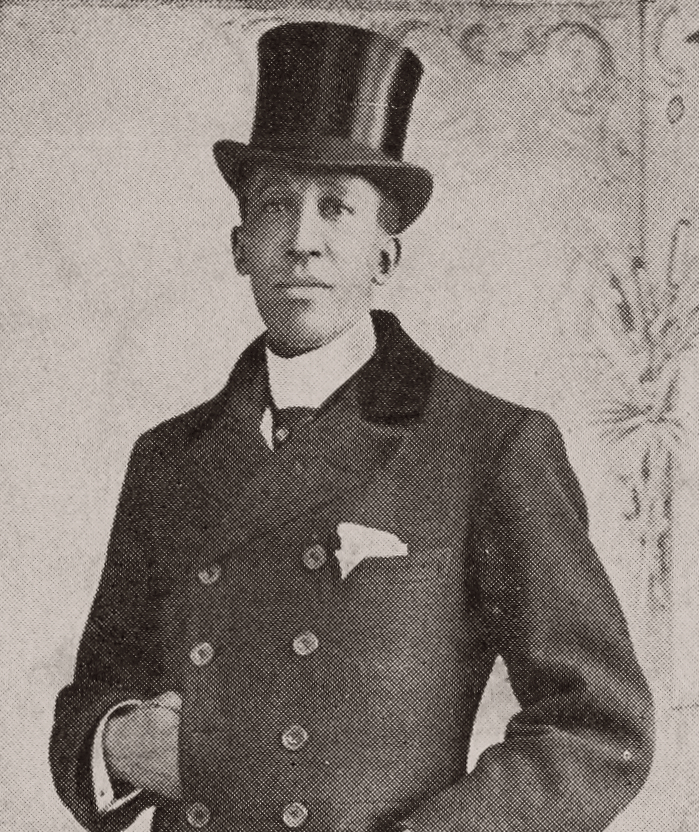
Sam Lucas pictured in 1901

The song was issued by Cady in January 1876 and made popular by the entertainer Sam Lucas in New Haven, Connecticut. Although Work awaited nothing beyond a moderate hit, Cady expected a widespread success. His prophecy was proven correct: the song would secure anywhere from eight-hundred thousand to a million sheet music sales. After Work sold the copyright to "Grandfather's Clock", Cady paid him a $4,000 royalty, (Note: Roughly equating to $125,000 in August 2026) helping to lift him out of poverty but not enough to sustain him during lulls in his songwriting output. (Note: Cady paid Work $250 in monthly royalties for "Grandfather's Clock", amounting to $4,000 by 1879. However, an 1884 issue of the Evening Capital claims that Work earned $300 a month, as opposed to $250.) In total, this was the highest bestowed to any American composer at the time, only possibly surpassed by Stephen Foster's "Old Folks at Home".

An 1879 issue of the San Marcos Free Press highlights its ubiquity, claiming that not knowing the song "argues yourself unknown", being "nightly played in theater and concert halls to applauding auditors". In his 1879 biography of Work, George Birdseye declared it "without doubt the most popular song in this country". None of Work's compositions after "Grandfather's Clock" reproduced its success. Work's passion for songwriting also took another hit; following its revival in early 1876, he would only issue two compositions before another hiatus in 1879.

The American music historians John Tasker Howard and George Kent Bellows claimed in 1967 that hardly any school songbook in the United States leaves out "Grandfather's Clock". According to The Garland Encyclopedia of World Music, it was "perhaps" the most popular American song of the 1870s. The author Philip Furia suggests it was the first song to become famous through a national marketing campaign.

"Grandfather's Clock" performed by the Hayden Quartet in 1905

The earliest known recording of this song was made the Hayden Quartet.

It also coined the phrase "grandfather clock" to describe a longcase clock.

It is a standard of British brass bands and colliery bands, and is also popular in bluegrass music. "My Grandfather's Clock" became well known in Japan in 1962 when the NHK children's music program Minna no Uta broadcast the recording by Tachikawa Sumito. It was accompanied by an animated sequence created by Taniuchi Rokurō. The song became incorporated into educational settings in Japan ever since. A second version was broadcast on Minna no Uta in 1972 which used the same recording but had a new animated sequence by Takeguchi Yoshiyuki.

=== "Sequel to Grandfather's Clock" ===
1878 sheet music cover to "Sequel to Grandfather's Clock"

In 1878, Work composed a follow-up titled "Sequel to Grandfather's Clock", attempting to gain from the original's success. It continues the song's storyline after the grandfather's death; a relative of his returns to the old man's home to encounter his beloved clock, now no longer working, displaced, and then watches it being burnt for kindling wood; in its place now stands an unsightly wall clock. They report:

Once again have I roamed thro' the old-fashioned house,
Where my grandfather spent his ninety years.
There are strangers in charge, and the change they have wrought—
Oh! it saddens me, even to tears.
Dear old clock! when they found you were speechless from grief,
Then they went and swapped you off, case and all,
For that vain, stuck-up thing (tick, tick, tick, tick, tick, tick, tick, tick)
For that vain, stuck-up thing on the wall.

The sequel never reached the popularity of the original. Birdseye admitted this conclusion, but he wrote in 1879 that it was reaping "an extensive sale".

== Bibliography ==
=== Books ===
- Cockrell, Dale; Zinck, Andrew M. (2001). "Popular Music of the Parlor and Stage". In Koskoff, Ellen (ed.). Garland Encyclopedia of World Music. Vol. 3: The United States and Canada. New York City: Garland Publishing. pp. 179–201.
- Ewen, David (1977). All the Years of American Popular Music. Englewood Cliffs, New Jersey: Prentice-Hall. ISBN 978-0-13-022442-2.
- Finson, Jon W. (1994). The Voices That Are Gone: Themes in Nineteenth-Century American Popular Song. New York City: Oxford University Press. ISBN 0-19-505750-3.
- Furia, Philip (2016). The American Song Book: The Tin Pan Alley Era. New York City: Oxford University Press. ISBN 978-0-19-939187-5.
- Howard, John Tasker; Bellows, George Kent (1967). A Short History of Music in America. New York City: McFarland & Company. ISBN 0-8152-0162-1.
- Kelley, Bruce C.; Snell, Mark A. (2004). Bugle Resounding: Music and Musicians of the Civil War Era. Columbia, Missouri: University of Missouri Press. ISBN 0-8262-1538-6.
- Merriam-Webster's Collegiate Dictionary (10th ed.). Springfield, Massachusetts: Merriam-Webster. 2000. ISBN 0-87779-708-0.
- Sadie, Stanley; Tyrrell, John, eds. (2001). The New Grove Dictionary of Music and Musicians. Vol. 27 (6 ed.). New York City: Macmillan Publishers. ISBN 1-56159-239-0.
- Work, Henry C. (n.d.). Work, Bertram G. (ed.). Songs of Henry Clay Work. New York City: Little & Ives.

=== Studies and journals ===
- Birdseye, George (1879). "America's Song Composers: IV. Henry Clay Work". Potter's American Monthly. 12 (88): 284–288 – via Internet Archive.
- Epstein, Dena J. (1944). "Music Publishing in Chicago before 1871: The Firm of Root & Cady, 1858–1871". Notes. 1 (4): 43–59. doi:10.2307/891291. JSTOR 891291.
- Hill, Richard S. (1953a). "The Mysterious Chord of Henry Clay Work". Notes. 10 (2): 211–225. doi:10.2307/892874. JSTOR 892874.
- Hill, Richard S. (1953b). "The Mysterious Chord of Henry Clay Work (Conclusion)". Notes. 10 (3): 367–390. doi:10.2307/892162. JSTOR 892162.
- Tribble, Edwin (Winter 1967). "'Marching Through Georgia'". The Georgia Review. 21 (4): 423–429. JSTOR 41396391.
- Tomizawa, Mizuo; Satō, Keiji. "みんなのうた《大きな古時計》(1962年）映像再現の試みについて" [On the Attempt to Revive the 1962 Footage of 'My Grandfather's Clock' from Minna no Uta] (PDF). Kyushu University Institutional Repository (in Japanese): 22–38. Archived (PDF) from the original on April 5, 2024.

=== Websites, news articles, and other media ===
- "[Untitled]". Evening Capital. July 18, 1884. p. 2.
- Fulcher, Michelle P. (March 8, 2021). "For this Centennial Man, 'My Grandfather's Clock' Was the Real Thing". CPR News. Archived from the original on October 11, 2026.
- "Herald Notes". The Morning Herald. November 4, 1878. p. 3.
- "Grandfather Clock". Oxford English Dictionary. September 2015.
- "My Grandfather's Clock: A Song That Was Suddenly Made Popular—Henry C. Work's Melodies". San Marcos Free Press. January 25, 1879. p. 3.
- Webster, Ian (June 10, 2026). "Inflation Calculator". CPI Inflation Calculator. Archived from the original on July 4, 2026.
- Work, Henry C. (1878). Sequel to Grandfather's Clock. New York City: C. M. Cady – via Library of Congress.
