= Max Möller (luthier) =

Dutch luthier (1915 - 1985)

Guillaume Max Möller (aka Max Jr.; 1915–1985 Amsterdam) was a Dutch master luthier from Amsterdam who authored a seminal reference book, The violin-makers of the Low Countries (Belgium and Holland) (1955) OCLC 251291325 Möller also provided the illustrations.

== Career highlights ==
Möller was mentored as a luthier by his father, Paul Max Möller (1875–1948). He also trained at Staatliche Berufsfachschule für Musikinstrumentenbau Mittenwald (Musical Instrument Making School Mittenwald). Möller was employed by Amédée-Dominique Dieudonné (1890– ) and Charles Enel (1880–1954). He moved to New York 1935 to work with Simone Sacconi in the workshop of Emil Herrmann. Upon the death of his father in 1948, Möller returned to Amsterdam to head his father’s studio, where he worked with continuing craftsmen Karl Rutz (1896– ), Jan Santmann (1920–1978), and later Hartmut Leonhardt until Möller's retirement 1980. His son, Berend Max Möller (1944–1989), succeeded him at the violin studio until he had been fatally shot in 1989 during a home burglary. Berend's wife, Cornélie, ran the shop until 2006. Luthier Andreas Post (born 1956), a master violin maker who had trained in Mittenwald (1982) and worked for Möller, moved his shop into the same location at nl:Willemsparkweg (15 Willems Park Road) in 2008.

Möller won the Coupe du Gouvernment de Liège for a quartet in 1954, and a frequent member of competition juries himself. In addition to writing his seminal book, The Violin-Makers of the Low Countries in 1955, he co-founded of the Entente des Maîtres Luthiers et Archetiers d’Art (Understanding Masters Violin and Bow Makers Art) and the Netherlands.

== Selected works ==
- The violin-makers of the Low Countries (Belgium and Holland), William Lewis & Son Co. (1955) OCLC 251291325
- Some notes on the re-hairing of bows, by Max Möller, Lincolnwood, Illinois: William Lewis & Son Co. (1975) OCLC 41690600
- Re-hairing of bows, by Max Möller, Ernst Lohberg, & Gladys Mickel Bell, Lincolnwood, Illinois: William Lewis & Son Co. (196?) OCLC 1822195, 786143130

Reprinted from Violins and Violinists, William Lewis & Son Co. (publisher), Vol. 20, Nos. 2, 3, & 6 (1959) ISSN 0748-8645
Möller: Some notes on the re-hairing of bows
Lohberg: Additional notes on the re-hairing of bows
Bell: Demonstration

- Italiaansche vioolbouw van Gasparo da Salò tot Pressenda; beknopt overzicht van ontstaan en ontwikkeling der vioolbouwkunst in Italië (Italian style violins from Gasparo da Salò to Pressenda; a summary of emergence and development of violin architecture in Italy), by Paul Max Möller Sr., and Max Möller Jr. (1936) OCLC 9191300, 251292465, 811979104 and OCLC 563830414
- Ik bouw violen (Dutch to English: I build violins), by Max Möller, Stichting IVIO (1950) OCLC 524486978

== See also ==
- Category:Lutherie reference books
