= Max Möller =

Max Möller may refer to:

- Max Möller (luthier) (1915–1985), Dutch violin-maker from Amsterdam
- Max Möller (SS officer), Nazi Unterscharführer serving at Treblinka, dubbed "Amerikaner"
