= Frank Kovanda =

American bow maker (1904–1993)

- Born: September 14, 1904; Chicago, Illinois, U.S.
- Died: April 21, 1993 (aged 88)
- Occupations: Bow maker; violin maker
- Years active: 1921–1970s
- Employer(s): William Lewis & Son Co. (1924–1945)

Frank Kovanda (September 14, 1904 – April 21, 1993) was an American stringed-instrument bow maker (also known as an archetier). He was internationally known for his fine craftsmanship and reproductions of bows by earlier bow makers.

== Biography ==
Born in Chicago, Illinois, Kovanda began his profession there in 1921 while attending Harrison Technical High School, from which he graduated the next year; he learned violin making from, and worked for, John Hornsteiner and developed his talents under the watchful guidance of Carl G. Becker, becoming Becker's assistant and protégé.

Kovanda was for many years associated with William Lewis & Son in Chicago (in 1924–1945), where he gained recognition for his outstanding ability as a maker of fine bows and their fittings. While in the employ of William Lewis & Son, he also repaired and restored the finest bows that came through the shop. He was hailed as a superb copyist by many, including William Lewis and Joseph Roda. He moved to Los Angeles in 1946, where he opened his own shop, catering to cinema musicians. Kovanda enjoyed international fame as a master maker of violin, viola, and cello bows. During his years at William Lewis & Sons, Kovanda's patrons included violinists Mischa Elman, Jascha Heifetz, Zino Francescatti, Louis Kaufman, Fritz Kreisler, Yehudi Menuhin, Nathan Milstein, William Primrose, and Joseph Szigeti, and cellists Emanuel Feuermann, Raya Garbousova, Gregor Piatigorsky, and Joseph Schuster. An example Kovanda bow listed in the 1952 William Lewis & Son catalog reads, "Frank Kovanda c. 1938 bow mounted in gold/ebony, octagonal bow, Lewis No. 748, price $150 on par with Sartory, Dodd, Audinot, Thomassin".

Kovanda produced faithful copies of bows originally made by François Tourte, Dominique Peccatte, Nikolaus Kittel, and other famous makers. He also reproduced bow frogs (the heel of the bow).

One of the great American makers of the mid-20 century. After working many years for Lewis & Sons, he moved to Los Angeles after WWII and established [his] own shop there. Made several hundred bows. Was greatly influenced by the work of F. X. Tourte. Branded "F. KOVANDA". Some bows were left unstamped (as they were reproductions).

— Gennady Filimonov
