= Sinhŭng Military Academy =

1911–1920 Korean school in China

Sinhŭng Academy
- Various locations and branches in Manchuria

Information
- School type: Military academy
- Established: 1911
- Closed: August 1920

Official name
- Hangul: 신흥강습소
- Hanja: 新興講習所
- RR: Sinheung gangseupso
- MR: Sinhŭng kangsŭpso

Common name
- Hangul: 신흥무관학교
- Hanja: 新興武官學校
- RR: Sinheung mugwan hakgyo
- MR: Sinhŭng mugwan hakkyo

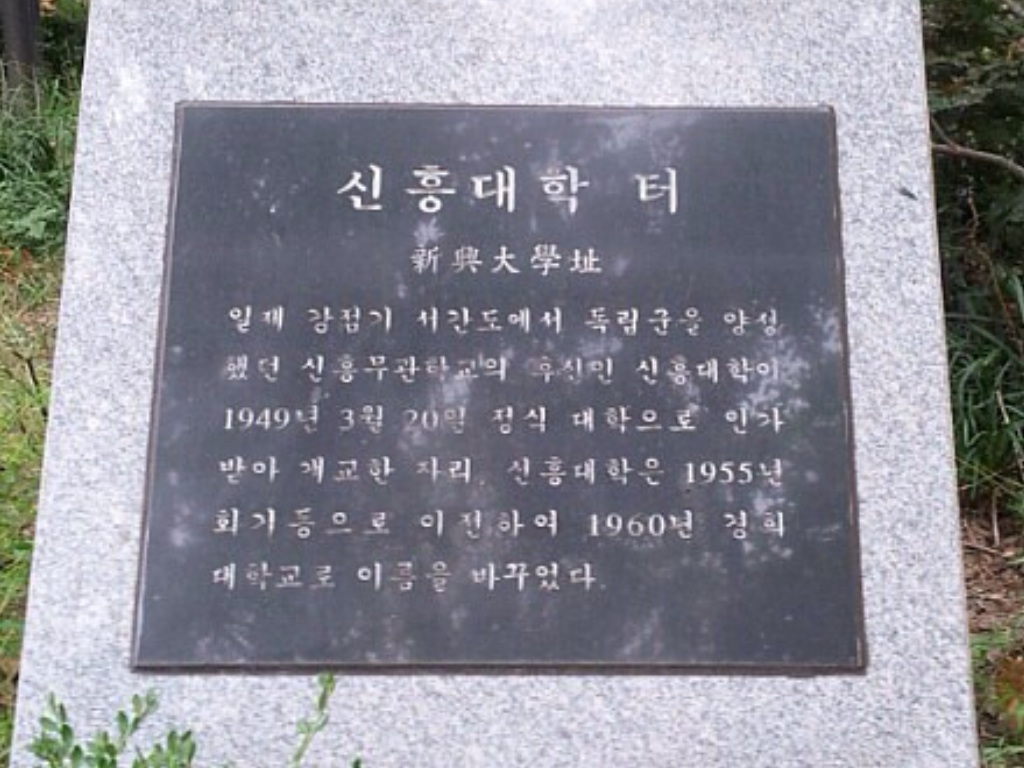
Plaque in the site where Shinheung Military Academy established Shinheung University

Sinhŭng Academy (Korean: 신흥강습소; Hanja: 新興講習所), commonly known as the Sinhŭng Military Academy (신흥무관학교; 新興武官學校; alternate spelling Shinheung Military Academy), was a training facility for militant Korean independence activists in exile in Manchuria, Republic of China. The school trained Koreans to fight and resist the Japanese colonization of Korea. It was established in 1911 and closed around August 1920.

== Name ==
The school's official name was "Sinhŭng Academy", although it was widely also known as the Sinhŭng Military Academy. Its name can be interpreted to mean "new rising academy". Sin comes from the Korean name of the New People's Association (Sinminhoe), and hŭng can be interpreted to mean "rising again".

== History ==
The school was first conceptualized in 1909 by the leadership of the Korean independence activist group New People's Association. Among them, Yang Kit'ak, Yi Tongnyŏng, and Yi Hoeyŏng were particularly active in advocating for the creation of military training facilities for Korean guerillas. In mid-1910, Yi Tongnyŏng and Yi Hoeyŏng toured southern Manchuria to scout locations for such a facility. In April 1911, they settled in Sanyuanpu (三源浦), Liuhe County, Jilin, where they established the organization Kyŏnghaksa. On June 10, 1911, Sinhŭng Academy was established as a suborganization of Kyŏnghaksa. The academy's first class of 40 students graduated in either April 1911, late 1911, or December 1911.

The school's resources were initially extremely tight, especially due to crop failures. They also received pushback from the local Chinese population. As such, until 1912, the training of the first few classes of students was relatively poor. A consensus grew that the school's location was too public and exposed, so it was eventually decided to move the academy elsewhere. Yi Hoeyŏng received approval for the purchase of land next to the Hani River (哈泥河) in Tonghua from the local and central Chinese governments. The new area was considered to be more defensible and secluded. Yi Hoeyŏng's older brother Yi Sŏgyong donated funds for the purchase of land and the school's construction; the brothers came from a relatively wealthy family and would continue to donate funds to the school afterwards. The other Yi siblings also moved to Manchuria and participated in the school's activities. Kyŏnghaksa and the academy were moved to this new location.

Kyŏnghaksa was reformed as Pumindan and served as the de facto local government for a village of around 6,000 Koreans. A building for the military academy was completed on July 20, 1912; its opening ceremony had 100 people in attendance. The new facility was much better equipped; it had barracks, lecture halls, and kitchens and other facilities. Still, it struggled with funds and resources. In order to support the school's activities, students would also participate in agricultural work.

With the outbreak of World War I in 1914, Sinhŭng Academy ramped up training, in anticipation of a conflict potentially coming to East Asia. That year, it had around 40 students that were mostly between the ages of 18 and 25. In spring of 1915, they established a second training facility, Paeksŏ Farm (백서농장; 白西農場) at a farm owned by Korean Kim Tongsam (김동삼). That facility's first class had 385 students.

After the outbreak of the 1919 March First Movement anti-colonial protests in Korea, independence activist sentiment amongst global Koreans flared. Pumindan absorbed several other location Korean organizations and was reorganized into the Hanjokhoe, and the military academy saw an influx of new students. The academy's headquarters was relocated to Gushanzi (孤山子); its previous location remained as a branch location, although it eventually closed. At the time of the move, the school's principal was Yi Si-yeong and vice principal Yun Kisŏp. Among its instructors was later prime minister of South Korea Lee Beom-seok. Its curriculum was reorganized. The school continued to struggle; there were a series of crop failures, one of its students Yun Ch'iguk (윤치국; 尹致國) was murdered due to a local dispute, and Yun Kisŏp was once kidnapped by bandits. Frustrated by the school's struggles, Yi Si-yeong and Yi Tongnyong left.

After the school's expansion, its activities were increasingly suppressed by the local Chinese government. In January 1920, Chinese warlord Zhang Zuolin, under Japanese pressure, ordered that Hanjokhoe and Sinhŭng cease operations. In May of that year, Chinese and Japanese forces worked together to forcefully rout out, arrest, or kill Korean independence activists. The academy attempted to escape the search by moving to Antu County in July 1920, but it closed by August 1920.

== Curriculum and activities ==
The school offered a number of programs of varying length for various roles, including a three-month program for non-commissioned officers, a six-month officer course, and a one-month special training course. The school's curriculum was based on materials from Chinese and Japanese military manuals.

For a time, the school also provided primary and middle school education, and taught general subjects such as the Korean language, geography, history, and economics. For this reason, the school colloquially went by the names "Sinhŭng Middle School" (신흥중학교) and "Sinhŭng Military Academy". Eventually middle school classes stopped being offered and only military courses remained.

In May 1913, the school's alumni founded the organization Sinhŭng Hagudan (신흥학우단; 新興學友團; also went by a variety of other names, including 신흥교우단). That organization established a publication Sinhŭng Hagubo (신흥학우보), which publicized the activities of the academy both domestically and abroad.

== Legacy ==
By the time of the school's closure, it had produced around 2,100 alumni. The school's alumni went on to play a major role in the Korean independence movement, especially as guerrilla forces in China. They participated in the famous Battle of Qingshanli in October 1920. Chi Ch'ŏngch'ŏn escaped with 300 students in the forests and joined forces with Korean general Hong Beom-do, and eventually ended up in the Korean Independence Corps. They largely joined organizations such as the Western Military Administration Office and Northern Military Administration Office. Some alumni, including famous activist Kim Won-bong, formed the organization Heroic Corps in 1919. In the 1940s, a number of them ended up in the Korean Liberation Army.

Military songs, such as the now famous "Song of the Independence Army", were created and sung in the school. After the school's closure, several of its songs dispersed amongst the Korean independence movement along with its alumni. In contemporary South Korea, that song has continued to be sung in ceremonies that honor the independence movement.

There are few visible traces of the academy's former facilities left.

=== Tributes ===
Of Yi Hoeyŏng and his five other siblings, only one lived to see the liberation of Korea in 1945: Yi Si-yeong. In February 1947, he established the Sinheung Vocational School (신흥전문학원). This school was named after the Sinhŭng Academy. In March 1960, it was controversially renamed "Kyung Hee University"; that university has continued to operate to the present. There have been a number of unsuccessful efforts to change the name of the university back to "Sinheung University".

As part of initiatives by South Korean president Moon Jae-in encouraging commemorations of the independence movement, on June 18, 2018, the Korea Military Academy held a ceremony to honor the 107th anniversary of the establishment of the Sinhŭng Military Academy.

On September 9, 2018, a South Korean musical about the school entitled The Shinheung Military School premiered. It was produced by the Republic of Korea Army. One army administrator said in a statement that "we produced this musical in recognition of the fact that the Sinhŭng Military Academy is a forebearer of the [South Korean] military". (Note: "신흥무관학교가 우리 군의 뿌리라는 인식에 따라 이번 뮤지컬을 제작하게 됐다")

== Notable alumni and staff ==
- Kim Won-bong
- Lee Beom-seok
- Chi Ch'ŏngch'ŏn

== See also ==
- March First Movement in Longjing
