= Ulf Wallin =

Swedish classical violinist

Ulf Wallin is a Swedish classical violinist and professor at the Hochschule für Musik Hanns Eisler Berlin.

== Life ==
Born in Växjö, Wallin studied at the Royal College of Music, Stockholm and at the Universität für Musik und darstellende Kunst Wien. He began his career as a soloist and chamber music player. Later he taught as a visiting scholar at the University of Music and Performing Arts Vienna and the Hochschule für Musik Detmold. Since 1996 he's holding a professorship at the Hochschule für Musik Hanns Eisler Berlin.

He has released more than 45 CDs, among others in 2011 and 2012 in two new recordings of R. Schumann's violin concerto. The Robert Schumann Philharmonic of Chemnitz under the direction of Frank Beermann played with him the concertante violin works (also the violin version of Schumann's cello concerto); he himself recorded with the pianist Roland Pöntinen the three violin sonatas.

== Awards ==
Together with Jon W. Finson, Wallin won the Robert Schumann Prize of the City of Zwickau in 2013. After Hansheinz Schneeberger, who was the only violinist among the Robert Schumann Prize winners in 1995, he was only the second violinist to receive this prize.

On 12 May 2014, Wallin was elected a member of the Royal Swedish Academy of Music.

== Discography ==
- Pettersson, Allan; Wallin, Ulf; Park, Sueye; Lukaçi, Daniel Vlashi; Tcakulov, German; Wollheim, Alexander; Hoppe, Thomas (2023), Concerto for violin and string quartet; String trio; &, Works for violin and piano (in no linguistic content), Åkersberga, Sweden: BIS, OCLC 1405906929
  - Pettersson, Allan; Wallin, Ulf (2023), Concerto for Violin and String Quartet (in no linguistic content), Åkersberga, Sweden: BIS, OCLC 1409398339
- Pettersson, Allan; Wallin, Ulf; Lindberg, Christian; Symfoniorkestern Norrköping (2019), Violin concerto no. 2; Symphony no. 17 (fragment) (in no linguistic content), Åkersberga, Sweden: BIS, OCLC 1127909782
- Wallin, Ulf; Pöntinen, Roland; Thedéen, Torleif; Webern, Anton; Schoenberg, Arnold (2005), Wallin, Thedéen, Pöntinen (in no linguistic content), [Sweden]: BIS, OCLC 811335442
- Strauss, Richard; Rivinius, Paul; Tilling, Camilla; Wallin, Ulf (2009), Rote Rosen songs by Richard Strauss (in German), BIS, OCLC 872053979
- Schumann, Robert; Wallin, Ulf; Beermann, Frank; Robert-Schumann-Philharmonie Chemnitz (2011), Complete works for violin and orchestra (in no linguistic content), Åkersberga, Sweden: BIS, OCLC 811451862
- Liszt, Franz; Wallin, Ulf; Pöntinen, Roland (2015), Works for violin and piano (in no linguistic content), Åkersberga, Sweden: BIS, OCLC 944920058
