= March First Movement in Longjing =

1919 protest and massacre in Longjing, China

Longjing Manse Movement
- Part of the March 1st Movement and the Korean independence movement
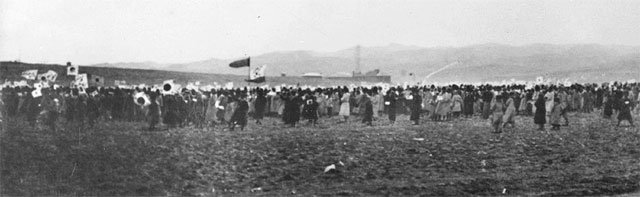
- Scene from the protest (March 13, 1919)
- Date: March 13, 1919
- Location: Longjing, Jilin, Republic of China

Casualties
- Deaths: 17 or 19
- Injuries: At least 30

The Longjing Manse Movement (Korean: 용정 만세운동; Hanja: 龍井萬歲運動) occurred on March 13, 1919 in what is now Longjing, Jilin, Republic of China. During this event, unarmed Korean peaceful protestors were fired on by Chinese soldiers under warlord Zhang Zuolin, which caused 17 or 19 deaths and around 30 injuries. This incident was one among various March 1st Movement protests by the Korean diaspora.

Estimates from eyewitnesses place the number of protestors to be around 20,000 to 30,000. This would represent around 10% of the total population of Jiandao ("Gando" in Korean) at the time. The protest was the first of its kind for Koreans in Jiandao, and is remembered for its role in bolstering the independence movement and inspiring similar subsequent protests there.

== Description ==
In 1910, Japan annexed Korea. On March 1, 1919, a nationwide protest against Japanese rule was held in Korea, in what has been dubbed the March 1st Movement. The protests were violently suppressed by Japan. Protests were also held by the Korean diaspora, such as those in Ussuriysk and in Shinhanchon, Vladivostok.

The Korean community in the north Jiandao region learned of the protests on March 7. The organization Korean Liberation Celebration Society (조선독립축하회; 朝鮮獨立祝賀會) was founded, and organized a protest. Local schools played a significant role in the organization. On March 13, the protest was held. Some people reportedly traveled from dozens of li away to join the protest, with some leaving the day before for the journey. Estimates vary on how many people were present, but some put it at around 20,000 to 30,000. The total population of Jiandao was around 250,000 to 300,000. At noon, the protest formally began with a reading of the Korean Declaration of Independence. A contemporary person wrote of this in their diary: (Note: 간도의 한민족이 용정에 모여 독립을 부르는 날이다. 우리 마을에서도 참여하는 사람이 10여 명이나 되었다. 나는 부친 상중이라 감히 갈 수 없어 아들에게 태극기 하나를 들려 보냈다. 이날 이날 이날, 과연 광복이 되는 날인가? 사람마다 어찌 이렇게도 화색이 짙은가? 저녁 때 들으니 사방에서 인사들이 소식을 듣고 모여 인산인해를 이루었다고 한다. 정오 종소리에 맞춰 용정 부근 서전대야에 큰 조선독립 깃발을 세우고 사람마다 태극기를 들고 조선독립만세를 부르며 독립을 선언했다. 깃발은 해를 가리고 함성은 우레와 같았다. 이를 본 왜인의 얼굴색이 잿빛으로 변했다.)

This is the day that the Korean people of [Jiandao] gather in Longjing and shout for independence. Around 10 people from my village were there. I couldn't go because my father was in mourning, so I sent my son along with a taegeukgi. This day, this day, this day [sic], could this be the day of our liberation? How is it that every person is glowing? [After the protest] in the evening, I heard that a large crowd of people gathered from all over to hear the news. After the noon bell finished ringing, a large flag celebrating Korea's independence was unfurled. Everyone raised their own flags and shouted "long live Korean independence". The flag blocked the sun, and the shouting echoed like thunder. When the Japanese authorities saw this, their faces turned ashen.

After the ceremony, the crowd began marching and distributing flyers and waving Korean flags. The protest walked to the Japanese consulate building in Longjing.

The Japanese consulate pressured Chinese warlord Zhang Zuolin to send soldiers to suppress the protest. Soldiers were deployed under the command of Meng Fude (Chinese: 孟富德), who ended up giving the command to open fire on the protestors. After the volley of shots, 13 protestors were immediately killed, and over 30 were injured. They were rushed over to a local hospital, and but four died there. By the end of the day, 17 or 19 total were dead.

On the 17th, a funeral was held for the dead, whom were hailed as martyrs, on a hill 10 li south of Longjing. Reportedly around 5,000 people were in attendance. From the 13th until the beginning of April, 47 protests were held in north Jiandao, with tens of thousands in attendance total. By mid-May, the number reached 54.

== Legacy ==
Reportedly, the Japanese consulate would later send people to monitor who would visit the graves, which caused fear of backlash and slowed visits to them. Knowledge of the location of the grave significantly dwindled over time. In 1989, the location was rediscovered and documented based on interviews of contemporaries. It was determined to be a part of a collective graveyard on a hill 10 li southeast of Longjing. In April 1990, an organization was launched to maintain the restoration and memorialization of the graves. Since 1991, a memorial ceremony for the dead has been held each year on March 13th. In the 2000s, a larger plot of land was purchased elsewhere for the graves, which were relocated. A hundred trees were planted around them. The graves have nearby space to host an audience of 200.

The place the protest was first planned is now part of a kindergarten. A stone memorial now stands there.

== See also ==
- Sinhŭng Military Academy
