= Song of the Independence Army =

Song of the Korean independence movement

Song of the Independence Army (Korean: 독립군가) is a Korean-language military song associated with the Korean independence movement during the 1910–1945 Japanese colonial period. It is now considered to be one of the most widely known songs of the Korean independence movement in Manchuria. Its lyrics were composed in the 1910s and its melody is borrowed from the American Civil War song "Marching Through Georgia".

== History ==
The song's lyrics were written in the 1910s at the Sinhŭng Military Academy, where it served as the school's anthem. When the school closed under Japanese pressure in 1920, its alumni spread the song throughout Manchuria.

== Legacy ==
In South Korea, the song is sung to commemorate Korean independence activists. In 2023, it was sung at a ceremony honoring the 80th anniversary of the death of Korean independence activist Hong Beom-do. In 2024, it was sung at a ceremony honoring the 105th anniversary of the establishment of the Provisional Government of the Republic of Korea.

독립군가 - 가수 백자 (2025.1.25 정규생방)

In 2005, South Korean punk rock band Crying Nut made their own version of the song, as part of an initiative by the Ministry of Patriots and Veterans Affairs that encouraged making modern versions of traditional Korean patriotic songs. The Republic of Korea Army released a cover of the song on YouTube in 2018.
