= Stephen Foster: America's Troubadour =

1934 biography by John Tasker Howard

- Title page for Stephen Foster: America's Troubadour (1935)
- Author: John Tasker Howard
- Language: English
- Subject: Biography
- Publisher: Thomas W. Crowell Company
- Publication date: 1934
- Publication place: United States
- Pages: 445
- OCLC: 593629432

Stephen Foster: America's Troubadour is a 1934 biography by John Tasker Howard that documents the life of American musician Stephen Collins Foster.

== Reception ==
John W. Oliver of Pennsylvania History: A Journal of Mid-Atlantic Studies called Stephen Foster: America's Troubadour the "best biography of Stephen Foster yet written."
