= Giovanni Francesco Pressenda =

Italian violin maker (1777 - 1854)

Giovanni Francesco Pressenda (Lequio Berria (Cuneo), 1777 – Turin, 12 December 1854) was an Italian violin maker.

He completed his apprenticeship in Turin, probably in the workshop of French violin makers such as Lété and Calot.

Giovanni Francesco Pressenda was born in a modest farmstead just outside the village, in the fraction called Bordia on 6 January 1777: his parents were farmers. Traditionally considered to be the son of an amateur violinist and musician himself, Pressenda is thought to have been trained in Cremona (as he claimed). Recent research shows that in spite of the good education he received he was a farmworker for a long time and never attended Cremonese workshops.

His apprenticeship began in Turin soon after 1815 in the workshop of Leté-Pillement, an active establishment dealing in different kinds of musical instruments; he remained there a short time after the death of Nicolas Leté in 1819, and around 1821 was able to open his own firm. Since then, due also to the support of the principal violin players of Turin, Giovanni Battista Polledro and Giuseppe Ghebart, Pressenda's reputation was firmly established and he produced a consistent number of instruments.

It seems that in the French workshop he learned not only violin making technique but also workshop management, since he always relied on the assistance of various collaborators, including François Calot, Pierre Pacherel and Giuseppe Rocca.

Pressenda died in Turin on 12 December 1854 (in loneliness and poverty). He ranks amongst the most important violin makers from the Turin School.

== Bibliography ==
- Versari Artemio, Three centuries of Italian Violin Making (2003)
