= Bows for Musical Instruments of the Violin Family =

1959 musical instrument reference book

- Author: Joseph Madison Roda
- Publisher: William Lewis and Son
- Publication date: 1959

Bows for Musical Instruments of the Violin Family is a seminal luthier reference book compiled by the late Chicago violinist Joseph Madison Roda (1894–1970) and published in 1959 by William Lewis and Son of Chicago. The book is about bows and bow makers and includes detailed illustrations prepared by Gladys Mickel Bell (1901–1992). Roda, a Czech immigrant from the small village Nový Dvůr near Myslív, had been a violinist with the Chicago Grand Opera Company from 1933 to 1935 and a violist with the Chicago Symphony from 1936 to 1956 Bell, at the time, was a violinist, cellist, music educator, and sales person at William Lewis and Son.
