= Grant County Herald Independent =

Newspaper in Wisconsin

- Type: Weekly Newspaper
- Format: Broadsheet
- Owner: Morris Multimedia
- Publisher: John Ingebritsen
- Editor: David Timmerman
- Founded: 1843
- Headquarters: United States
- Circulation: 2,238 (as of 2022)
- Website: swnews4u.com

The Grant County Herald Independent is a newspaper printed in Lancaster, Wisconsin. Owned by Morris Multimedia, it is the state's oldest weekly newspaper. The newspaper was first published in 1843 under the name of the Grant County Herald.

== History ==
The newspaper began as the Grant County Herald on Saturday, March 18, 1843, printed by the Schrader, Mallett & Company. The first publisher of the newspaper was J. D. Spalding. A little over a year later, Spalding was joined by James Goodhue, an attorney in Lancaster, who began writing for the newspaper in July 1844, often under the pen name of "G." Goodhue wrote for the paper for five years before moving to Minnesota, where he started his own newspaper, The Minnesota Pioneer, which eventually became the St. Paul Pioneer Press, the oldest newspaper in Minnesota.

The newspaper was edited from 1958 to 1960 by Mark W. Hopkins, who later joined the Milwaukee Journal and the U.S. the Voice of America.

== Location ==
The offices for the Herald Independent are in downtown Lancaster, along the Grant County Courthouse Square.
