= William Lewis & Son Co. =

American violin and bow store, founded 1874

William Lewis & Son was a distinguished Chicago-based music store that specialized in violins and bows. The firm was founded in 1874. In 1995, the company was purchased by Selmer, and has since become a division of Conn-Selmer, Inc., a wholly owned subsidiary of Steinway Musical Instruments.

== Firm history ==
Established in 1874, the firm endured for over 80 years, and among other things, amassed an important collection of fine orchestral string instruments from the violin family, which included those of Antonio Stradivarius, Giuseppe Guarneri, Domenico Montagnana, Sanctus Serafin, Lorenzo Storioni, Rugeri, Joannes Baptista Guadagnini, Nicolas Lupot, J. B. Vuillume. The bows collected included those of François Tourte, Dominique Peccatte, Nicolaus Kittel, Jean Pierre Marie Persois.

The firm gained coast-to-coast clientele and built credibility with notable musicians — professional and amateur. With comprehensive services for string players, the firm came to be known as the "Violinist's Headquarters." Several notable makers and restorers worked for the firm, including Carl G. Becker (1887–1975) and Frank Kovanda. Lewis & Son produced influential publications, including How Many Strads by Ernest Nicholas Doring (1877–1955), (who worked for the firm), Violins & Violinists a magazine for which Doring was editor, and Bows for Musical Instruments of the Violin Family, by Joseph Roda (1894–1963).

In 1862, after the outbreak of the American Civil War, Lewis moved to Chicago where he joined Root & Cady, a music publisher founded in 1858. The Great Chicago Fire of 1871 destroyed Root & Cady — its place of business, then located at the Crosby Opera House, and all its assets. Unable to recover, Root & Cady folded under duress of bankruptcy in February 1875.

In 1874, Ebenezer Towner Root (1822–1896) partnered with Lewis to form the house of Root & Lewis. Ebenezer Root, brother of George Frederick Root (1820–1895), had been a senior partner at Root & Cady when it folded. The Cady part of the name belonged to Chauncey M. Cady (1824–1859).

From 1878, the firm was known as the Chicago Music Co., also known as Lewis & Newell, in the late 1880s, known as Lewis, Newell & Gibbs.

Locations

- 1885: 148 & 150 Washbash Avenue
- to 1946, 207 S. Wabash, 8th floor
- after 1946 to the 1970s, 30 E. Adams, 5th floor

Initial partner

- Edward Gibbs Newell (1840–1902)

Later partners

- William Adams Pond Sr. (1824–1885), a New York music publisher
- Charles A. Zoebisch (1803–1890)
- Platt P. Gibbs (1853–1935), William Lewis' brother-in-law
- Frederick Clatworthy Lewis (1874–1940), William Lewis' son

The firm name was finalized as William Lewis & Son in 1888.

== Lewis biography ==
William E. Lewis (1837 Devonshire, England – 1902 Chicago), the son of a formidable cellist, became a violinist. His concertizing at the age of eight elicited acclaim by English critics as a musical prodigy. In 1850, his parents brought him to America, settling in Bellevue, Ohio. He soon joined a musical troupe known as the Continental Vocalists. During trips to New York City, Lewis took lessons with Theodore Thomas, who later became the founding musical director of the Chicago Symphony Orchestra. Lewis married Elizabeth Gibbs (1838–1912). One of Lewis' business partners, Platt P. Gibbs, was Elizabeth's brother.
