= Root & Cady =

Music publishing firm

- Status: Defunct
- Founded: 1858
- Founder: Ebenezer Towner Root and Chauncey Marvin Cady
- Country of origin: United States
- Headquarters location: Chicago
- Publication types: Sheet music

Root & Cady was a Chicago-based music publishing firm, founded in 1858. It became the most successful music publisher of the American Civil War and published many of the most popular songs during that war. The firm's founders were Ebenezer Towner Root (1822–1896) and Chauncey Marvin Cady (1824 - 1889).

The company's publishings include The Silver Lute, the first music book printed in Chicago. It was eventually used in the city's public school system.

Root & Cady dominated Chicago's music publishing industry until the Great Chicago Fire of 1871 destroyed $125,000 of the firm's inventory, leading to its bankruptcy within a year. In 1875, the former members of Root & Cady formed a new firm: The Root & Sons Music Company. The members were (i) George F. Root (1820–1895), (ii) Frederick Woodman Root (1846–1918), George's son, (iii) Ebenezer Towner Root (1822–1896) — George's brother — (iv) William Lewis (1837– ), (v) William A. Root — George's brother — and (vi) Charles C. Curtiss (1847–1928), who served as manager.

== See also ==
- Fanny Crosby (1820–1915), songwriter
- William Lewis & Son Co., offshoot of The Root & Sons Music Company
