= Jon W. Finson =

American musicologist (born 1950)

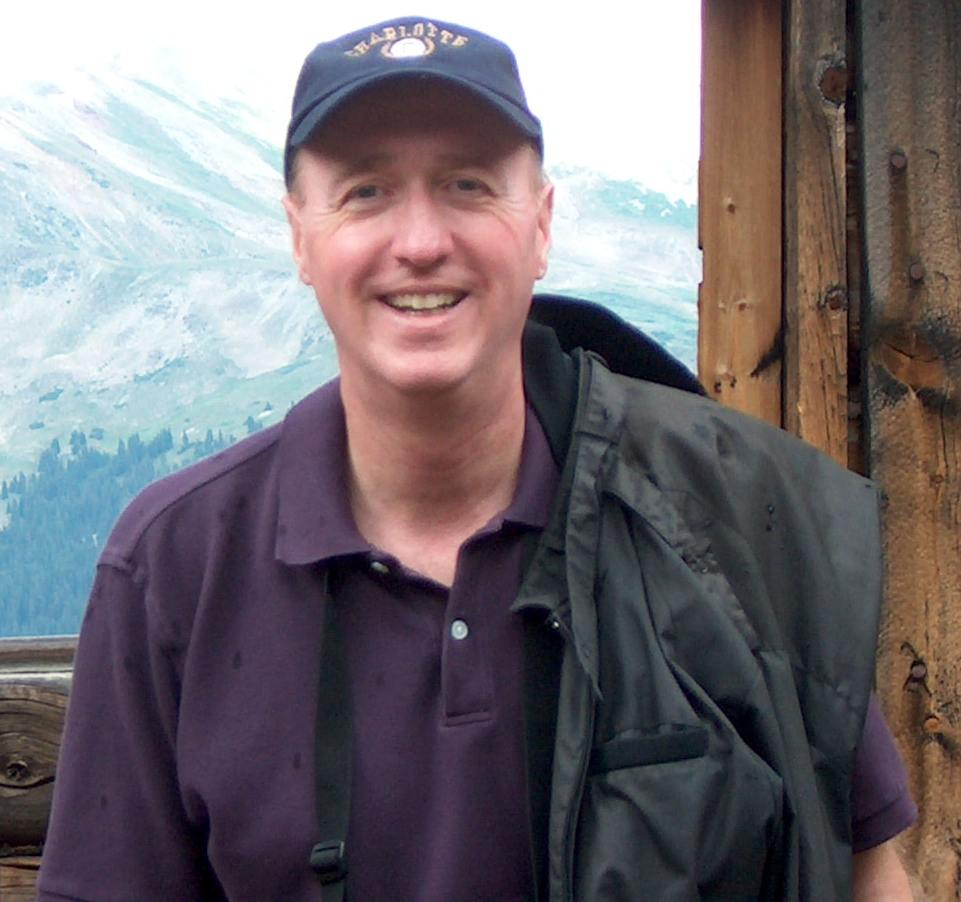
- Born: November 4, 1950; Chicago
- Education: University of Colorado Boulder; University of Wisconsin-Madison; University of Chicago
- Occupations: Musicologist, novelist
- Years active: 1976–present

Jon W. Finson (born November 4, 1950) is an American musicologist and author.

== Education and Academic Career ==
Finson grew up on the North Shore of the Chicago suburbs. He attended New Trier High School West, electing in his junior year an advanced curriculum using Great Books of the Western World developed at University of Chicago by Robert Maynard Hutchins and Mortimer Adler. He evinced a keen interest in orchestral music as well, studying contrabass with Harold Siegel at New Trier and with Daniel Swaim at the short-lived Reston Summer Music Center in 1967 (where he also studied orchestral conducting with Vasilios Priakos). Finson subsequently enrolled at the University Colorado, Boulder, College of Music, where he took a Bachelor of Music degree with a major in musicology, graduating with honors in 1973. While at Colorado, he furthered his study of conducting with Abraham Chavez, serving as assistant conductor and principal bassist of the CU Symphony. He selected a minor in voice with Barbara Sable, who inspired in him a passion for Schumann's and Mahler's lieder, as well as for American popular song of the nineteenth and twentieth centuries. In 2016 Finson received a Distinguished Alumni Award from the CU College of Music.

Finson continued his study of musicology (especially its epistemology and ontology) at the University of Wisconsin—Madison with Lawrence Gushee, who served as his advisor for a master's thesis on "The Performance Practice of Four String Quartets Active in the First Twenty-five Years of the Twentieth Century as Documented on Direct-cut Macrogroove Discs" (MA, 1975). At Wisconsin he minored in linguistics and also studied early music and viola da gamba with visiting professor David Fallows. He played contrabass professionally for the Madison Symphony Orchestra during the 1973–74 season.

Finson wrote his doctoral dissertation (Ph.D. 1980), "Robert Schumann: The Creation of the Symphonic Works," at the University of Chicago under the supervision of Philip Gossett, with the support of a fellowship from the Martha Baird Rockefeller Fund for Music. Subvened by the Fund for a year abroad, Finson examined Schumann autographs in Vienna at the Archive of the Gesellschaft der Musikfreunde, at the Bibliothèque nationale de France in Paris, and at the Berlin State Library. During his Berlin residence, he attended lectures by Carl Dahlhaus on theories of musical form. Finson's work on the philology of nineteenth-century music, in addition to his interest in early music and viola da gamba, garnered him a professorship (now emeritus) with the University of North Carolina at Chapel Hill, where he taught musicology and American Studies from 1978 to 2013. He directed the UNC Collegium Musicum instrumental ensemble and choir from 1978 to 1988 (serving afterwards as an advisor).

Scholarly Writing

Finson wrote his first article at UW Madison for The Galpin Society Journal on "The Violone in Bach's Brandenburg Concerti" (1976). His second article, "Music and Medium: Two Versions of Manilow's 'Could It Be Magic'," exploring the phenomenon of time limits in the radio broadcast of popular songs, appeared in The Musical Quarterly (1979). He contributed many subsequent articles on the symphonic works of Robert Schumann to The Musical Quarterly, The Journal of Musicology, and The Journal of the American Musicological Society, also authoring a number of book chapters for scholarly collections. Other articles addressed the performing practice of late nineteenth-century music, with particular reference to Brahms, in The Musical Quarterly (1984) and the politico-cultural implications of Gustav Mahler's Wunderhorn lieder in The Journal of Musicology (1987).

Two of his eleven books published to date figure prominently in research on Robert Schumann:

- Robert Schumann and the Study of Orchestral Composition: The Genesis of the First Symphony; Op. 38 (Studies in Musical Genesis and Structure). Clarendon Press, Oxford (1989}. ISBN 978-0-19-313213-9
- Robert Schumann: The Book of Songs. Harvard University Press, Cambridge, MA (2007). ISBN 0-674-02629-2

His other scholarly books include:

- The Voices That Are Gone: Themes in 19th-Century American Popular Song, Oxford University Press, New York (1994, paperback 1997), and
- Nineteenth-Century Music: The Western Classical Tradition, Prentice Hall, Upper Saddle NJ (2002); second revised ed. Kindle Publishing, Seattle (2021).
- The Sound of the Image: Concepts in Film Music, forthcoming from Kindle Publishing.

He has lectured and held seminars throughout North America, in Germany, England, and in Hong Kong.

Editions

Finson contributed his first scholarly edition to the series Music of the United States of America (publications):

- Edward Harrigan and David Braham: Collected Songs, 2 vols., AR Editions, Madison, WI (1997) for the American Musicological Society.

He later published:

- Robert Schumann: Symphony No. 4 in D minor, Op. 120, First Version 1841, Breitkopf & Härtel, Wiesbaden (2003).

This critical edition of the Schumann D-minor Symphony's first version won a "Best Edition Award" (2004) from the Association of German Music Publishers. Recordings of the edition are available online in the Digital Concert Hall of the Berlin Philharmonic conducted by Simon Rattle, and streaming by the North German Radio Orchestra (Hamburg; Sony) conducted by Thomas Hengelbrock and by the West German Radio Orchestra (Düsseldorf) conducted by Heinz Holliger.

== Fiction ==
In retirement, Finson has published six novels and a novella of historical fiction on LGBTQ+ subjects, four of more general interest:

- A Time of Confidences: Novel of Summer, Kindle Publishing, Seattle (2014, 3rd rev. ed. 2025).
- A Chosen Landscape: Adventures in the Gay Academy, Kindle Publishing, Seattle (2016, rev. ed. 2025).
- L'Envoyé Extraordinaire: A Novella in Three Parts, Kindle Publishing, Seattle (2026).
- Touching 'em All: A Tale of Gay Baseball, a short novel, Kindle Publishing, Seattle (2026)

A series of three crime novels:

- Death on the Drive, Kindle Publishing, Seattle (2018, rev. ed. 2025).
- Mortality Watch, Kindle Publishing, Seattle (2018, rev. ed. 2025).
- In Death's Shade, Kindle Publishing, Seattle (2018, rev. ed. 2025).

== Prizes ==
Together with Ulf Wallin, he won the 2013 Robert Schumann Prize of the City of Zwickau.
