= John Tasker Howard =

American historian

- Born: November 30, 1890; Brooklyn, New York
- Died: November 20, 1964 (aged 73); West Orange, New Jersey
- Occupation: Music historian
- Known for: Our American Music (1931); Stephen Foster: America's Troubadour (1934)
- Spouse: Ruth Hunter

John Tasker Howard (November 30, 1890 – November 20, 1964) was an early American music historian, radio host, writer, lecturer, and composer. His Our American Music, published in 1931, was an early general history of music in the United States.

Howard was the curator in the Music Division of the New York Public Library from 1940 to 1956.
