= Dena Epstein =

American musicologist (1916–2013)

Dena Epstein

Dena Julia Polacheck Epstein (30 November 1916 – 14 November 2013) was an American music librarian, author, and musicologist.

== Early life ==
Epstein was born in Milwaukee to William Polacheck and Hilda Satt. She studied music at the University of Chicago and library science at the University of Illinois, graduating in 1943. She worked as a cataloguer at the latter institution while completing her degree, and upon graduation was appointed the Senior Music Librarian at Newark Public Library. In 1946 she began working as a cataloguer and reviser for the Library of Congress music section. After spending a period as a homemaker, she returned to the University of Chicago in 1964 as the Assistant Music Librarian, in which position she served for 22 years.

== Scholarship ==
Beginning in 1955, Epstein began researching the historical origins of American slave music. Her 1977 book on the topic, Sinful Tunes and Spirituals: black folk music to the Civil War, was awarded the Chicago Folklore Prize and the Simkins Prize of the Southern Historical Association. Among other findings, Epstein demonstrated that the banjo emerged from the African slave tradition rather than rural white culture, a revelation that "shattered myths and sparked a remarkable revival of black string band music". Epstein received two National Endowment for the Humanities grants for her research, which was included in several musicology journals. She also published Music Publishing in Chicago Before 1871 (1969) and I Came a Stranger: The Story of a Hull-house Girl (1989), an edited autobiography of her mother.

== Legacy ==
Epstein served as president of the Music Library Association (MLA) from 1977 to 1979, and was awarded the association's highest citation in 1986. MLA adjudicates a research award named after Epstein.

Filmmaker Jim Carrier created The Librarian and the Banjo to document Epstein's contribution to American ethnomusicology. He noted that she "revolutionized our understanding of American music... we take for granted that African-American music is the tap root of popular American music. We owe much of that knowledge to this music librarian who set out to correct history".

Epstein's papers and correspondence are held by Columbia College Chicago's Center for Black Music Research.

Epstein also appeared in the PBS documentary program American Experience, "Chicago, City of the Century." Her interview regarding her mother and conditions in the Near West Side Neighborhood at the turn of the 19th century appears on Disc 3: Battle for Chicago.
