= 1862 in literature =

This article presents lists of the literary events and publications in 1862.

== Events ==
- February – Ivan Turgenev's novel Fathers and Sons (Отцы и дети – old spelling Отцы и дѣти, Ottsy i dety, literally "Fathers and Children") is published by Russkiy Vestnik in Moscow.
- March 30 or 31 – The first two volumes of Victor Hugo's epic historical novel Les Misérables appear in Brussels, followed on April 3 by Paris publication, with the remaining volumes on May 15. The first English-language translations, by Charles Edwin Wilbour, are published in New York on June 7, and by Frederic Charles Lascelles Wraxall, in London in October.
- April 6 – Two months after joining the staff of General William Babcock Hazen, Ambrose Bierce joins in the Battle of Shiloh, later the subject of a memoir. Among those on the opposite side is the future journalist and explorer Henry Morton Stanley, who will also record his experiences.
- April 28 – Thomas Hardy becomes an assistant to architect Arthur Blomfield.
- June – Nikolai Chernyshevsky is imprisoned in Saint Petersburg and begins his novel What Is To Be Done?
- June 4 – Henry Morton Stanley, now a "Galvanized Yankee", joins the Union Army; he is discharged 18 days later because of illness.
- July – George Eliot's historical novel Romola begins serialization in Cornhill Magazine, the first time she has published a full-length book in this format. George Murray Smith of the publishers Smith, Elder & Co. has agreed a £7,000 advance for it.
- July 1 – Moscow's first free public library opens as The Library of the Moscow Public Museum and Rumiantsev Museum, predecessor of the Russian State Library.
- July 4 – Charles Dodgson (better known as by his later pseudonym Lewis Carroll) extemporises a story for 10-year-old Alice Liddell and her sisters on a rowing trip on The Isis from Oxford to Godstow. The story becomes a manuscript titled Alice's Adventures Under Ground and is published in 1865 as Alice's Adventures in Wonderland.

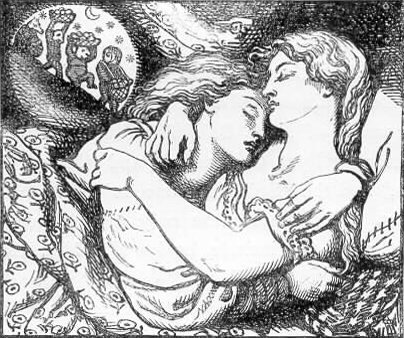
Illustration from the cover of Christina Rossetti's Goblin Market and Other Poems, by her brother Dante Gabriel Rossetti

- September 23 – Leo Tolstoy marries Sophia (Sonya) Andreevna Behrs, 16 years his junior, in Moscow, having given her a diary detailing his previous sexual relations.
- November 26 – Charles Dodgson sends the handwritten manuscript of Alice's Adventures Underground to Alice Liddell.
- November 29 – Serialization of The Notting Hill Mystery by "Charles Felix" (probably Charles Warren Adams) commences in Once A Week (London), with illustrations by George du Maurier; it is seen as the first full-length detective novel in English.
- December – Louisa May Alcott becomes a nurse at the Union hospital in Georgetown
- December 24 – William Dean Howells marries Elinor Mead at the American Embassy in Paris.

Uncertain dates

- James Russell Lowell begins writing for The North American Review.
- Karl Heinrich Ulrichs begins writing about homosexuality under the pseudonym of "Numa Numantius".

== New books ==
=== Fiction ===
- William Harrison Ainsworth – The Lord Mayor of London
- José de Alencar – Lucíola
- Mary Elizabeth Braddon – Lady Audley's Secret
- Camilo Castelo Branco – Amor de Perdição
- Edward Bulwer-Lytton – A Strange Story
- Wilkie Collins – No Name
- Fyodor Dostoevsky – The House of the Dead (‹Записки из Мёртвого дома›, Zapiski iz Myortvogo doma, book publication)
- George Eliot – Romola (serialization)
- Gustave Flaubert – Salammbo
- Eugène Fromentin – Dominique
- The Goncourt brothers (Edmond and Jules de Goncourt) – Sister Philomene (Sœur Philomène)
- Victor Hugo – Les Misérables
- Henry Kingsley – Ravenshoe
- George MacDonald – David Elginbrod
- Watts Phillips – The Honour of the Family
- Fritz Reuter – From My Farming Days
- John Skelton – Thalatta, or the Great Commoner
- Elizabeth Drew Stoddard – The Morgesons
- William Makepeace Thackeray – The Adventures of Philip
- Aleksey Konstantinovich Tolstoy – Prince Serebrenni (‹Князь Серебряный›)
- Anthony Trollope
  - Orley Farm (publication completed)
  - The Small House at Allington (serialization begins)
- Ivan Turgenev – Fathers and Sons
- Mrs. Henry Wood – The Channings

=== Children and young people ===
- Frances Freeling Broderip – Tale of the Toys, Told by Themselves
- Catherine Crowe – The Adventures of a Monkey
- F. W. Farrar – St. Winifred's or The World of School
- Henrietta Keddie (as Sarah Tytler) – Papers for Thoughtful Girls, with illustrative sketches of some girls' lives
- Charlotte Yonge
  - Countess Kate
  - The Stokesley Secret

=== Drama ===
- Émile Augier – Le Fils de Giboyer
- María Bibiana Benítez – La Cruz del Morro (The Cross of El Morro)
- Bjørnstjerne Bjørnson – Sigurd Slembe (Sigurd the Bastard, trilogy, published)
- Henrik Ibsen – Love's Comedy (Kjærlighedens Komedie, first published)
- Watts Phillips – His Last Victory
- Edmund Yates – Invitations

=== Poetry ===
- Pavlo Chubynsky – "Shche ne vmerla Ukraina" (Ukraine's glory has not perished, later the text of the Ukrainian national anthem)
- Henrik Ibsen – Terje Vigen
- George Meredith – Modern Love
- Christina Rossetti – Goblin Market and other poems

=== Non-fiction ===
- John Hill Burton – The Book-Hunter
- Thomas De Quincey – Recollections of the Lakes and the Lake Poets
- John William Draper – The History of the Intellectual Development of Europe
- Theodor Fontane – Wanderungen durch die Mark Brandenburg, volume 1, Die Grafschaft Ruppin
- Julia Kavanagh
  - English Women of Letters
  - French Women of Letters
- George Perkins Marsh – The Origin and History of the English Language
- John Ruskin – Unto This Last
- Elizabeth Missing Sewell – Impressions of Rome, Florence, and Turin
- John Skelton – Nugæ Criticæ
- Samuel Smiles – Lives of the Engineers (5 volumes)
- Leo Tolstoy – "The School at Yasnaya Polyana"

== Births ==
- January 24 – Edith Wharton, American novelist (died 1937)
- February 17 – Mori Ōgai (森 鷗外), Japanese army surgeon, poet, translator and realist fiction writer (died 1922)
- April 11 – Lurana W. Sheldon, American author and newspaper editor (died 1945)
- May 1 – Marcel Prévost, French dramatist (died 1941)
- May 9 – Hugh Stowell Scott (Henry Seton Merriman), English novelist (died 1903)
- May 15 – Arthur Schnitzler, Austrian dramatist and novelist (died 1931)
- June 6 – Henry Newbolt, English poet (died 1938)
- June 18 – Carolyn Wells, American novelist and poet (died 1942)
- July 16 – Ida B. Wells, American journalist and novelist (died 1931)
- August 1 – Montague Rhodes James, English scholar and short story writer (died 1936)
- August 2 – Paul Bujor, Romanian politician, zoologist and short story writer (died 1952)
- August 6 – Goldsworthy Lowes Dickinson, English historian (died 1932)
- August 21 – Emilio Salgari, Italian adventure novelist (died 1911)
- August 29 – Maurice Maeterlinck, Belgian poet and playwright (died 1949)
- September 2 – Okakura Kakuzō (岡倉 覚三), Japanese writer on the arts (died 1913)
- September 27 – Francis Adams, Anglo-Australian poet, novelist and dramatist (died 1893)
- October 13 – Mary Kingsley, English travel writer (died 1900)
- November 15 – Gerhart Hauptmann, German dramatist, novelist and poet, winner of the Nobel Prize in Literature (died 1946)
- December 8 – Georges Feydeau, French farceur (died 1921)
- December 16 – John Fox, Jr., American novelist and journalist (died 1919)
- December 23 – Henri Pirenne, Belgian historian (died 1935)
- date unknown — Jessie King, Scottish essayist, poet, journalist (year of death unknown)

== Deaths ==
- January 11 – Jean Philibert Damiron, French philosopher (born 1794)
- February 24 – Bernhard Severin Ingemann, Danish novelist and poet (born 1789)
- February 27 (February 16 O.S.) – Constantin Sion, Moldavian polemicist, genealogist and literary forger (born 1795)
- April 6 – Fitz James O'Brien, Irish-American science fiction pioneer (born 1828)
- May 6 – Henry David Thoreau, American philosopher (born 1817)
- May 25 – Johann Nestroy, Austrian dramatist (born 1801)
- August 27 – Thomas Jefferson Hogg, English biographer (born 1792)
- November 26 – Julia Pardoe, English novelist and historian (born 1806)
- November 30 – James Sheridan Knowles, Irish dramatist and actor (born 1784)
- December 17 – Katherine Thomson, writing as Grace Wharton, English novelist and historian (born 1797)

== Awards ==
- Gaisford Prize – Robert William Raper (Trinity) for comic iambic verse: Shakespeare's Henry IV, Part II, Act 4, Sc. 3
- Newdigate Prize – Arthur C. Auchmuty, "Julian the Apostate"
