= Daisy Deane =

American ballad

Daisy Deane is an American ballad composed by Lieutenant T.F. Winthrop and James Ramsey Murray in an American Civil War camp. The music for it was published by Root & Cady. It has been recorded by the Nashville Mandolin Ensemble on the album The Arkansas Traveler: Music from Little House On the Prairie and on the 2016 album From the Parlor to the Prairie. The Library of Congress has a version published by S. Brainard's Sons. Grandpa Jones recorded a version of the song on King records in 1949. The song has also been recorded by Valerie Coates, Jason Andrews, Timothy O'Connor & Jeff Morrissey on the album From the Parlor to the Prairie.

The lyrics of the song reminisce about meeting Daisy Deane in a flowery meadow in springtime with green grass, flower buds, birds singing, and how she outshone the flowers. The scenery has faded and Daisy is reported as dead A research report describes it as a "strophic with chorus piano and voice". but the narrator's memory of her remains fresh and love for remains.

"None knew thee but to love thee thou dear one of my heart."
