= Usatov =

Usatov (Russian: Усатов) is a Russian masculine surname, its feminine counterpart is Usatova. Notable people with the surname include:

- Dmitri Usatov (1847–1913), Russian tenor and vocal teacher
- Nina Usatova (born 1951), Russian film and stage actress
