= William Krell =

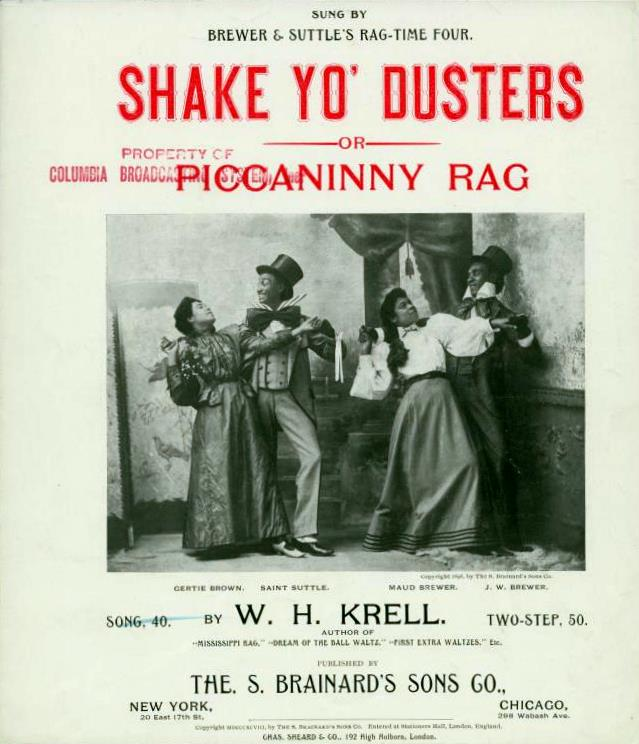
Piccaninny Rag, 1898

William Henry Krell (1868–1933) composed one of the early mature rag or ragtime compositions in 1897 called Mississippi Rag, published in New York by S. Brainard's Sons and copyrighted on January 27, 1897. The sheet music stated that it was the first rag-time two step ever written and was first played by Krell's Orchestra in Chicago although the structure is in the form of a patrol march. Many historians believe that "Mississippi Rag" was more so of a cake walk composition than a ragtime. The cover shows a group of all ages dancing to a banjo player before onlookers sitting on a pile of stacked cotton bales on a dock on the Mississippi River. Krell also composed the rag Shake Yo' Dusters! or Piccaninny Rag in 1898. "Mississippi Rag" was one of the compositions that help popularize the genre known as ragtime.

== Compositions ==
William Henry Krell was a Chicago band leader and composer whose other compositions included:

- Our Carter: A Beautiful Ballad (1893), with Silas Leachman
- The American Girl Battle Ship March (1898)
- The Cake Walk Patrol (1895)
- Fighting Bob Evans (1898)
- A Dream of the Ball: Waltzes (1895)
- Finnigan Cadets (1898)
- The First Extra: Waltzes (1895)
- Shake Yo' Dusters, or the Piccaninny Rag (1898)
- Strolling on the Beach (1895)
- Shake Yo' Dusters – Song (1898)
- The Time He Loves the Best (1895), with L. H. Freeman
- Cyrano (1899)
- Arbutus Waltz (1896)
- The Recreation (1896)
- The Bowery Spielers (1900)
- The Senator (1901)
- Summer Girl Waltzes (1897)

== Recordings of "Mississippi Rag" ==
Mississippi Rag has been recorded by Claude Bolling in 1966, the Firehouse Five Plus Two, Steve Pistorius, Turk Murphy, Paragon Ragtime Orchestra on "More Candy", Richard Zimmerman, Squeek Steele on "Ragtime Volume One", Harmonic Brass Munich on "There's a Man", Knuckles O'Toole on "Knuckles O'Toole: Plays The Greatest All-Time Ragtime Hits", Terry Waldo on "Ragtime Classics Vol. 1", Evergreen Ragtime Trio on "It's a Rouser", Trebor Jay Tichenor on "Ragtime Reunion", the Eastern Brass Quintet, the Avatar Brass Quintet on "Magnetic Rags: Ragtime for Brass", The Black Swan Classic Jazz Band, Lew Green and Jeff Barnhart on Arbors Records...Lew Green & Joe Muranyi:Together.

== The place of "Mississippi Rag" in the genre ==
Since being rediscovered during the first ragtime revival during the 1950s, "Mississippi Rag" has traditionally been regarded as one of the first mature ragtime composition to be published. Some musicians, for example Bill Edwards, prefer to classify the piece as a cakewalk, that is of a slightly earlier precursor style from which ragtime developed. To support this, Edwards points to the paucity of true syncopation in the written score. On the other hand, like many cakewalk pieces, "Mississippi Rag" readily lends itself to syncopated embellishment by the performer, as Edwards' own rendition of the piece demonstrates.
