= James Ramsey Murray =

American composer and hymnist (1841–1905)

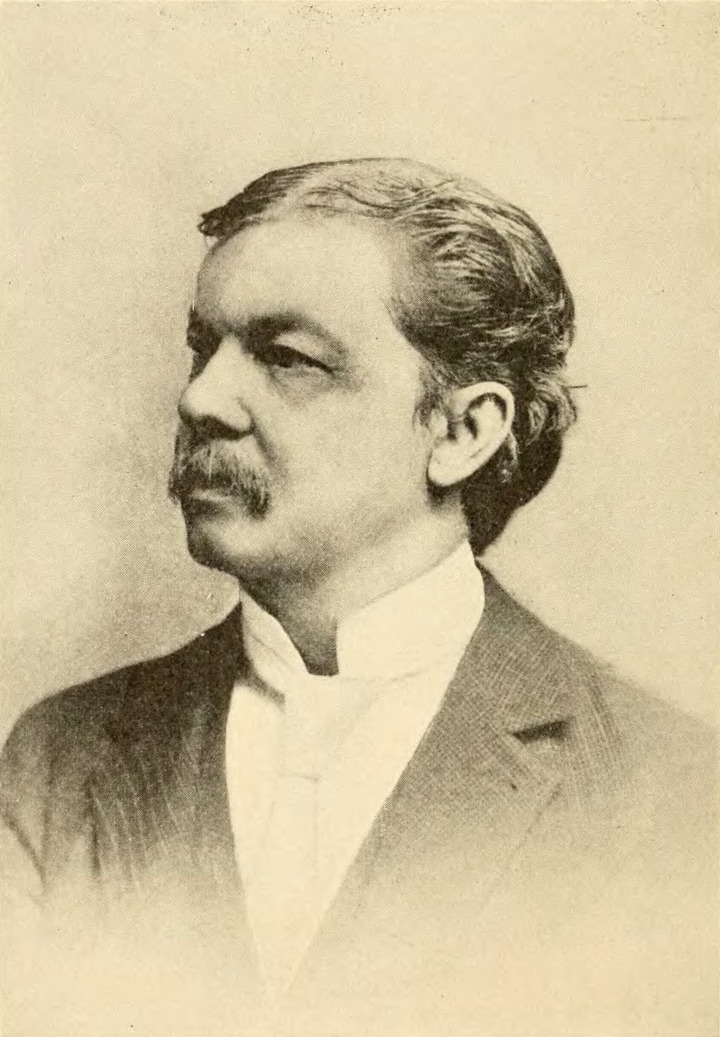
- Born: March 7, 1841; Ballardvale
- Died: March 10, 1905 (aged 64); Cincinnati

James Ramsey Murray (1841–1905) was an American composer and author including of songbooks. His work includes hymns and Christmas music and was published by Root & Cady as well as S. Brainard Sons. His work includes a popular arrangement of "Away in a Manger". He helped write "Daisy Deane" in an American Civil War camp.

Murray helped produce the singing lesson book The Pacific Glee Book with Frederic Woodman Root. A portrait of him by Jacob Henry Hall is in the Library of Congress.

Murray was born to a Scottish family.

Murray died on 10 March 1905 in Cincinnati of Addison's disease and he was buried at Spring Grove Cemetery

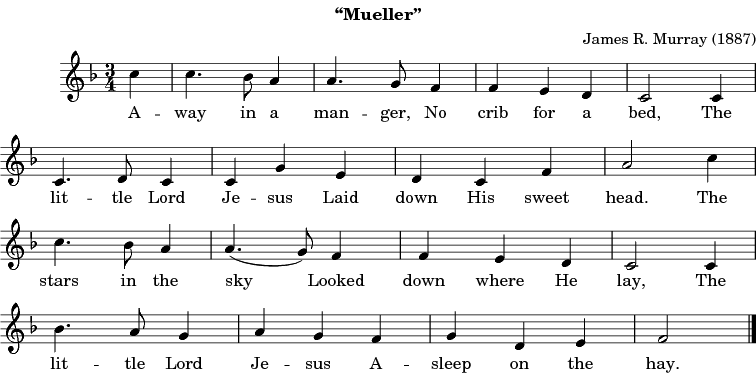
"Away in a manger" score

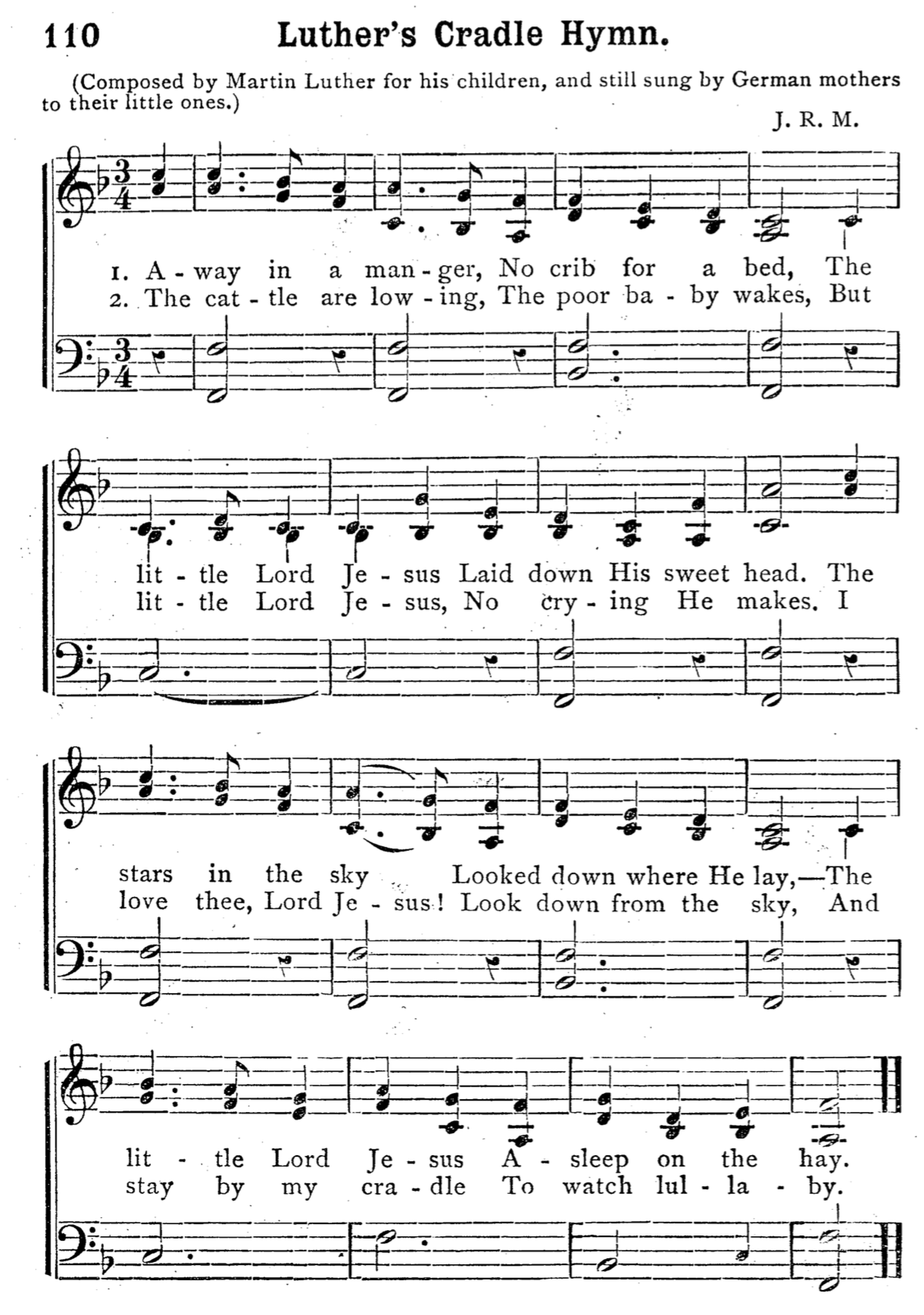
"Luther's Cradle Hymn" (an alternative name for "Away in a Manger") music

== Selected songs ==
- "Gallop" with H.W. Fairbank, on the Copper: Original Soundtrack

== Bibliography ==
- Pure Diamonds (1872)
- School chimes : a new school music book (1874)
- Joyful Songs (1875)
- Heavenward (1877)
- Heart and voice : a new collection of Sunday school songs (1881)
- Dainty songs for little lads and lasses : for use in the kindergarten, school and home (1887)
