= Johann Karl Simon Morgenstern =

Baltic German philologist (1770–1852)

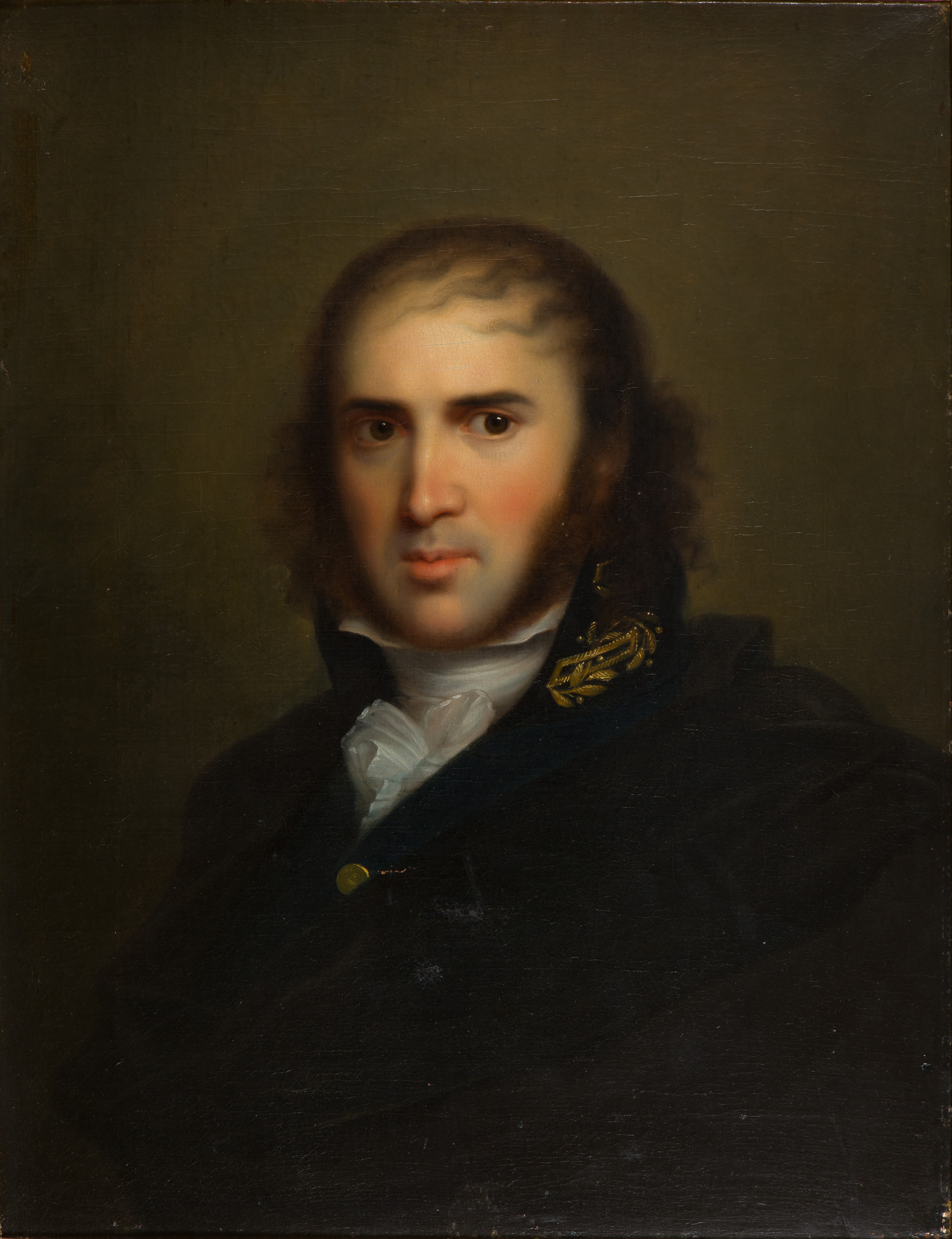
Portrait by Gerhard von Kügelgen, 1808

Johann Karl Simon Morgenstern (28 August [O.S. 17 August] 1770 – 15 September [O.S. 3 September] 1852) was a German philologist in Livonia, the first director of the library of the Imperial University of Dorpat. He coined the term Bildungsroman.

== Biography ==
Morgenstern was born in Magdeburg. He studied at the University of Halle under Johann August Eberhard in philosophy and Friedrich August Wolf in philology.

In 1802 he moved to Dorpat in Livonia, Russian Empire (now Tartu, Estonia) where he would spend the rest of his life. He held the chair for rhetoric, classical philology, aesthetics, and history of art and literature at the newly founded Imperial University of Dorpat and was the first director of its library.

The character of his work changed in Dorpat. He discontinued his Plato studies and wrote about literature, art, philology, and philosophy. Morgenstern's former teacher Friedrich Wolf was disappointed by this development, and he remarked in 1808 that his student was growing more elegant, vain, and boring with the years. It was in the course of this work that Morgenstern coined "Bildungsroman".

Even after his retirement in 1834 Morgenstern stayed in Dorpat. He bequeathed his 12,000-volume library, containing many manuscripts and a good part of the Kant estate, to the university. Four years after his death a medal was issued in his honor. Of this medal, made by Ferdinand Helfricht in Gotha, seven pieces were issued in silver and 200 in bronze.

== Works ==
- De Platonis Republica commentationes tres (1794)
- Auszüge aus den Tagebüchern und Papieren eines Reisenden (1811–1813)
- Über den Geist und Zusammenhang einer Reihe philosophischer Romane (1817)
- Über das Wesen des Bildungsromans (1820)
- Zur Geschichte des Bildungsromans (1824)

== Cultural references ==
In William Goldman's novel The Princess Bride the fictional author S. Morgenstern is almost certainly a nod to Morgenstern's coining of the term Bildungsroman, as the novel is representative of the genre.

== Gallery ==
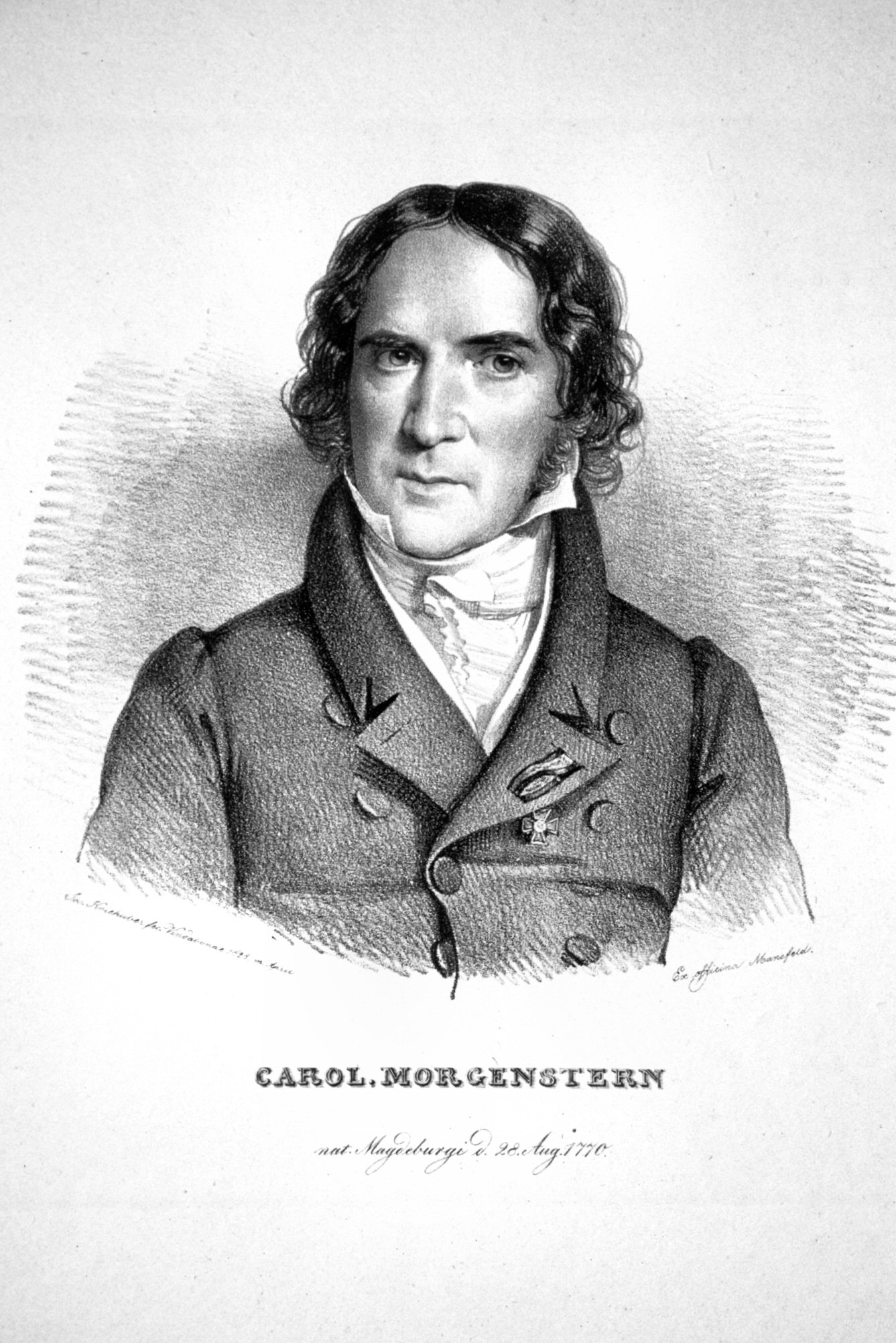

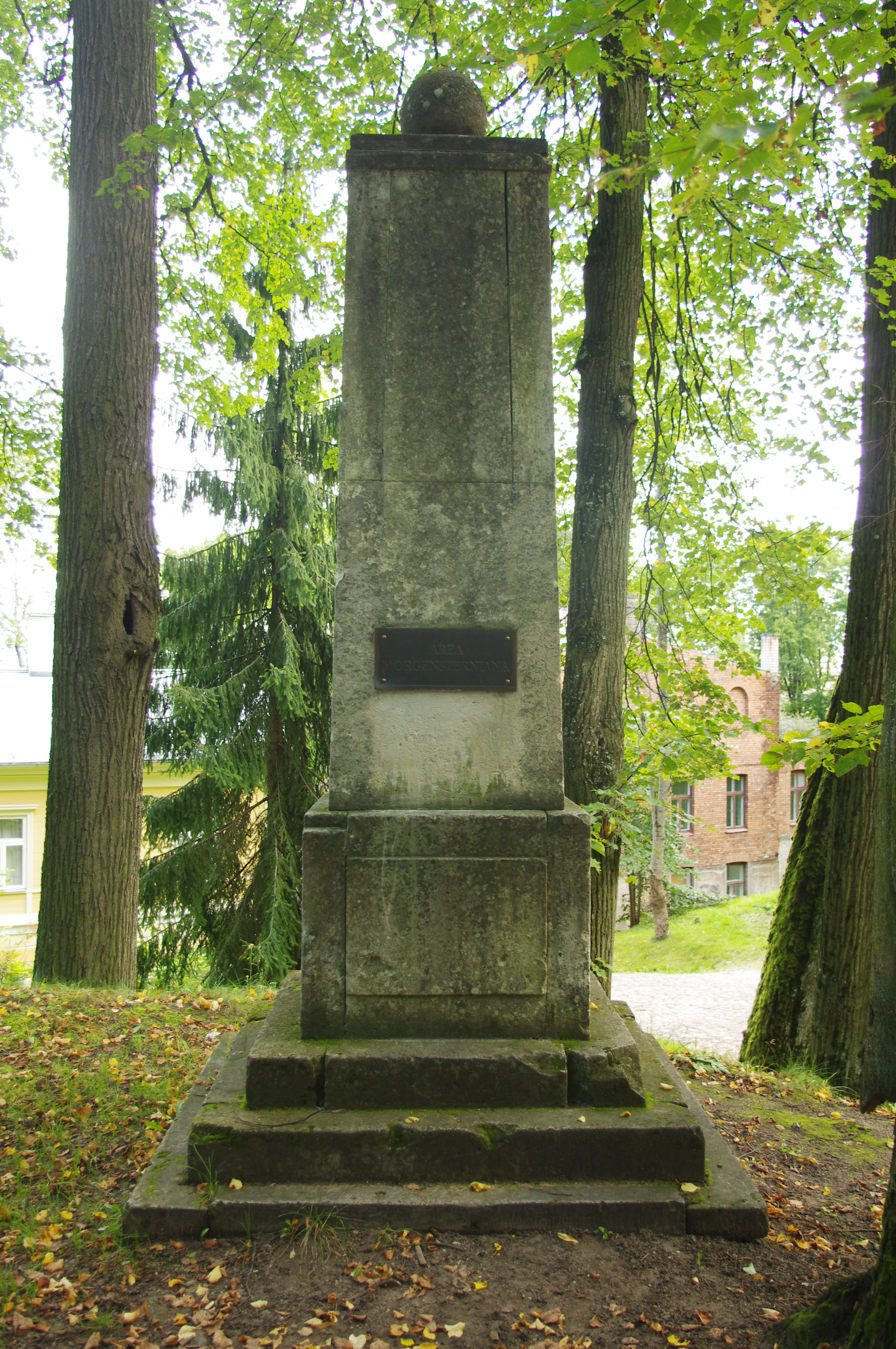
Memorial of Morgenstern on Toome Hill in Tartu (Dorpat)

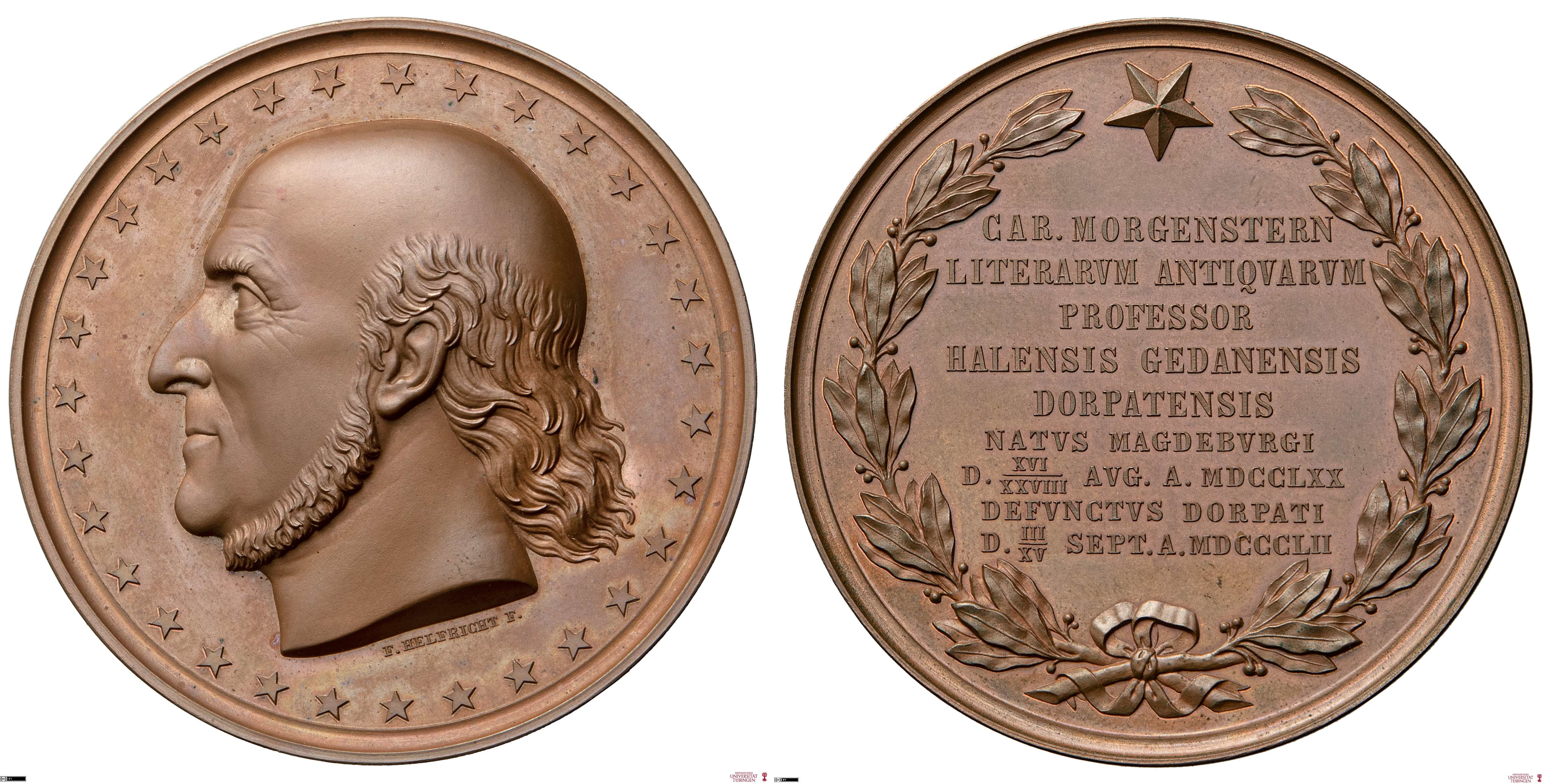
Medal Karl Morgenstern 1856.
