= Variations on a Theme by Tchaikovsky (Arensky) =

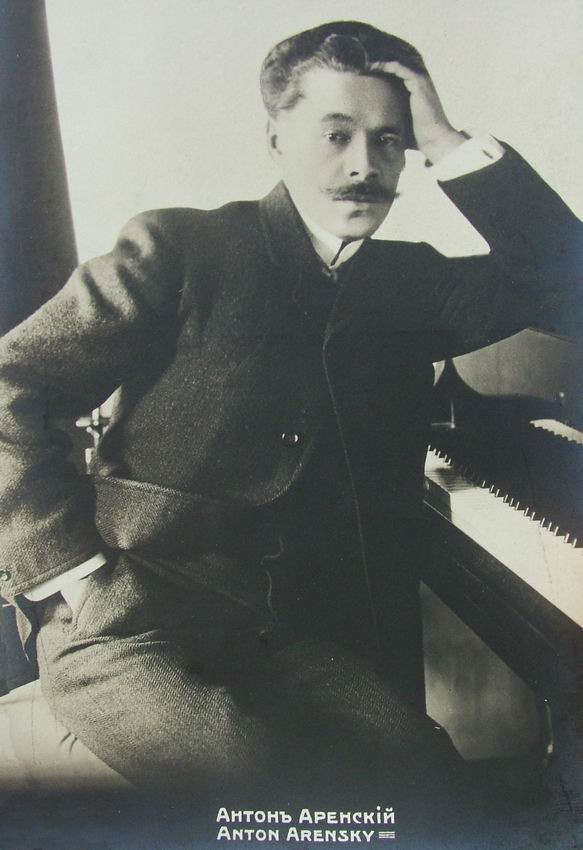
Anton Arensky, 1895

Variations on a Theme by Tchaikovsky, Op. 35a, a piece for string orchestra by Anton Arensky, started out as the slow movement of his String Quartet No. 2 in A minor, Op. 35, for the unusual scoring of violin, viola, and two cellos. It was written in 1894, the year after the death of Pyotr Ilyich Tchaikovsky, in a tribute to that composer. It is based on the theme from the song "Legend", the fifth of Tchaikovsky's Sixteen Children's Songs, Op. 54.

Tchaikovsky's song was originally set to a Russian translation by Aleksey Pleshcheyev of a poem in English called "Roses and Thorns" by the American poet Richard Henry Stoddard.

At the first performance of the quartet, the slow movement was so well received that Arensky soon arranged it as a separate piece for string orchestra, Op. 35a, in which form it has remained among the most popular of all Arensky's works.

== Structure ==
After Tchaikovsky's theme is heard, the piece has seven variations followed by a coda, set out as follows (mostly in the key of E minor):

- Theme, Moderato
- Variation I, Un poco più mosso –
- Variation II, Allegro non troppo – Starting with a sudden chord, the theme is heard in the lower strings.
- Variation III, Andantino tranquillo – Now in E major, the theme is taken up by the first violins.
- Variation IV, Vivace – This is a lively movement dominated by the offbeat pizzicato
- Variation V, Andante
- Variation VI, Allegro con spirito
- Variation VII, Andante con moto
- Coda: Moderato – This is a reprise of the theme, with harmonics in the first 2 measures.

== See also ==
- List of variations on a theme by another composer
