= Emily Bruce Roelofson =

Emily Bruce Roelofson (1832–1921) was an American composer, pianist, poet and singer. She composed songs and collections through at least opus number 15.

Roelofson grew up in Cambridge, Massachusetts. Her father, Alec W. Bruce, was an organist and dry goods merchant. Roelofson and her three sisters performed as the Bruce vocal quartet. She married Frederic Eugene Roelofson and they had a son and a daughter.

Little is known about Roelofson’s education. Her works were published by Arthur P. Schmidt & Co. and S. Brainard Sons.

== Poetry ==
- Forget Me Not (set to music by Alba Rosa Vietor)

== Songs ==
- As Through the Land, opus 15 no. 3 (text by Alfred Lord Tennyson)
- Carpe Diem, opus 15 no. 6 (text from A Masque of Poets)
- Christmas Lullaby
- From the Close Shut Window, opus 15 no. 5 (text by James Russell Lowell)
- Golden Bridges
- I Leaned Out of Windows, opus 15 no. 4 (text by Jean Ingelow)
- If Thou has no Dear Words
- Leaf in the Book
- Minnie Ray
- O Heart, My Heart, opus 15 no. 7 (text by Dinah Maria Mulock Craik)
- Sands of O’Dee, opus 15 no. 1
- Sea Shell, opus 15 no. 2 (text by Richard Henry Stoddard)
- Winter Song
