= Legend (Tchaikovsky) =

1883 song by Pyotr Ilyich Tchaikovsky

"Legend" (Russian: Легенда, Legenda), Op. 54, No. 5 (also known as "The Crown of Roses" in some English-language sources) is a composition by Pyotr Ilyich Tchaikovsky. Originally written in 1883 as a song for solo voice and piano, it was subsequently arranged by Tchaikovsky for solo voice and orchestra (1884), and then for unaccompanied choir (1889).

== Words ==
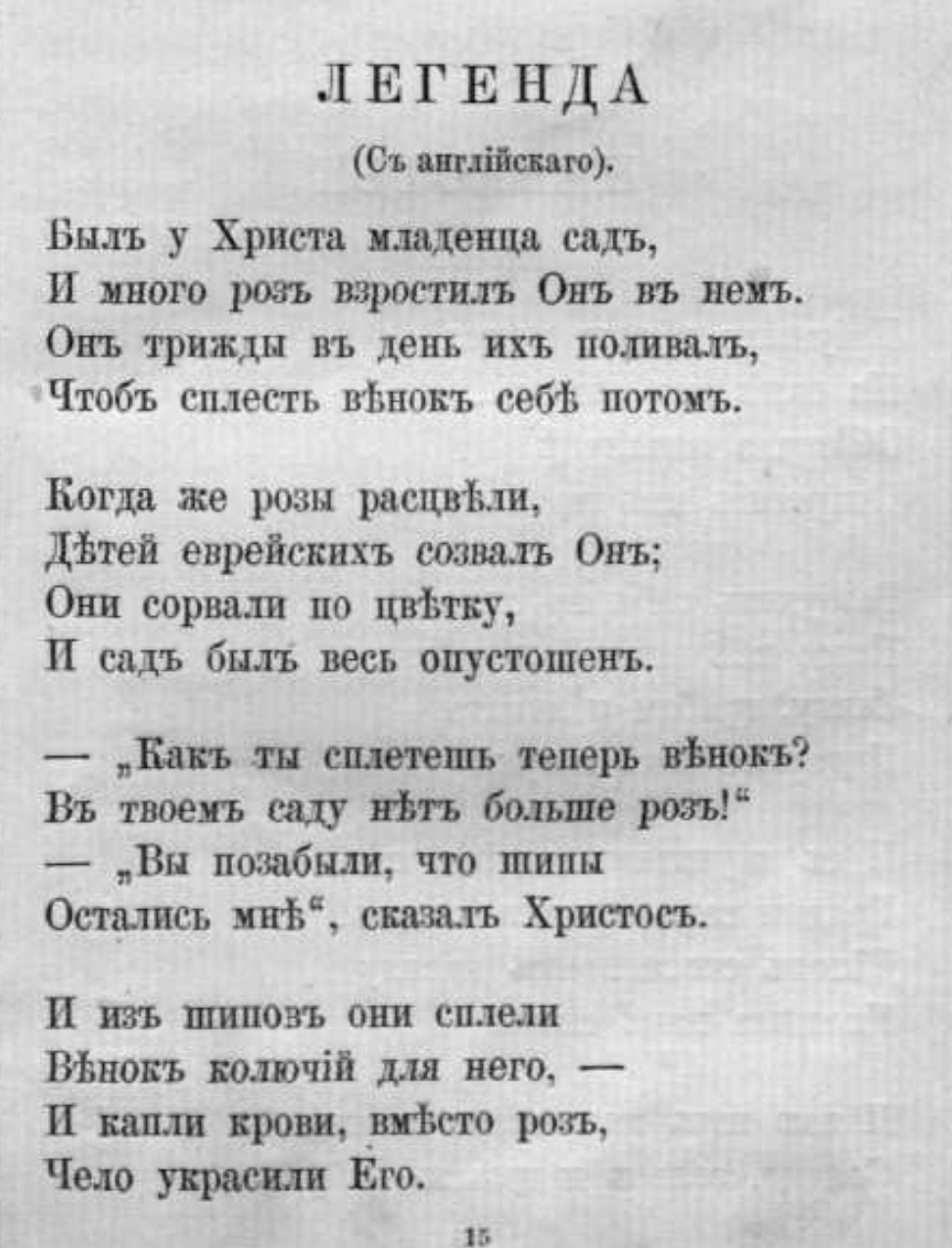
Pleshcheyev's poem "Legend" (Legenda), as published in his collection Snowdrop (1878)

The words are based on the poem "Roses and Thorns" by American poet Richard Henry Stoddard, originally published in Graham's Magazine of May 1856. Stoddard's poem was translated into Russian by the poet Aleksey Pleshcheyev and published in the Russian journal Семья и школа (Sem'ia i shkola [Family and School]) in 1877. Pleshcheyev described the origin of the poem only as "translated from the English", without crediting Stoddard, the nature of whose contribution was thus lost. The poem was included in Pleshcheyev's anthology Snowdrop (Подснeжник; 1878), where it was found by Tchaikovsky.

When "Legend" is sung by English-speaking choirs, the words used are usually those of Geoffrey Dearmer, who translated Pleshcheyev's Russian text back into English for the English Carol Book (1913). Dearmer was 20 years old when he wrote the words. While Pleshcheyev's Russian lyrics are a near-literal translation of Stoddard, and also copy the original rhyming scheme ABCB, Dearmer uses considerable poetic licence and a new rhyming scheme of AABB.

Stoddard (1856)	Pleschcheyev (1877)	Pleschcheyev (transliterated)	Pleschcheyev (literal translation)	Dearmer (1913)
The young child Jesus had a garden Full of roses, rare and red; And thrice a day he watered them, To make a garland for his head!	Был у Христа-младенца сад И много роз взрастил он в нем; Он трижды в день их поливал, Чтоб сплесть венок себе потом.	Byl u Khrista-mladentsa sad I mnogo roz vzrastil on v nem; On trizhdy v den' ikh polival, Chtob splest' venok sebe potom.	The Christ-child had a garden And he grew many roses in it; He watered them three times a day, To make a wreath for himself.	When Jesus Christ was yet a child He had a garden small and wild, Wherein he cherished roses fair, And wove them into garlands there.
When they were full-blown in the garden, He led the Jewish children there, And each did pluck himself a rose, Until they stripped the garden bare!	Когда же розы расцвели, Детей еврейских созвал он; Они сорвали по цветку, И сад был весь опустошен.	Kogda zhe rozy rastsveli, Detey yevreyskikh sozval on; Oni sorvali po tsvetku, I sad byl ves' opustoshen.	When the roses blossomed, He called the Jewish children; Each plucked a flower, And the garden was completely bare.	Now once, as summer-time drew nigh, There came a troop of children by, And seeing roses on the tree, With shouts they plucked them merrily.
"And now how will you make your garland? For not a rose your path adorns:" "But you forget," he answered them, "That you have left me still the thorns.	"Как ты сплетешь теперь венок? В твоем саду нет больше роз!" – "Вы позабыли, что шипы Остались мне", – сказал Христос.	"Kak ty spletesh' teper' venok? V tvoyem sadu net bol'she roz!" – "Vy pozabyli, chto shipy Ostalis' mne", – skazal Khristos.	"How will you weave a wreath now? There are no more roses in your garden!" – "You forget, the thorns Remain with me", said Christ.	"Do you bind roses in your hair?" They cried, in scorn, to Jesus there. The Boy said humbly: "Take, I pray, All but the naked thorns away."
They took the thorns, and made a garland, And placed it on his shining head; And where the roses should have shone, Were little drops of blood instead!	И из шипов они сплели Венок колючий для него, И капли крови вместо роз Чело украсили его.	I iz shipov oni spleli Venok kolyuchiy dlya nego, I kapli krovi vmesto roz Chelo ukrasili yego.	And they made from the thorns A prickly wreath for him, And drops of blood instead of roses Adorned his head.	Then of the thorns they made a crown, And with rough fingers pressed it down. Till on his forehead fair and young Red drops of blood like roses sprung.

== Music ==
The song is in the key of E minor, but the lack of any accidentals in the melody gives it a modal character. The original form of the song has a brief piano introduction and coda. This is retained in the orchestral arrangement. In the choral arrangement, the introduction is eliminated, and the piano coda is replaced by a choral coda featuring extremely low basses.

The melody of the original version is shown below:

The relative major (G major) is prominent in Tchaikovsky's harmonization, as the following fragment, (from the choral arrangement) illustrates:

== Performance and publication history ==
The original version of the music, for solo voice and piano, was published as part of Tchaikovsky's Songs for Children, Op. 54, in 1884.

The orchestra arrangement was made for tenor Dmitri Usatov, who premiered it in April 1884 at the Bolshoi Theatre.

The choral arrangement was premiered by the Chorus of the Imperial Opera under the direction of Fyodor Becker in March 1889. Both the orchestral and choral arrangements were published in 1890.

The choral arrangement was subsequently performed under Tchaikovsky's direction at one of the official opening concerts of Carnegie Hall in May 1891. According to the New York Times review, it "made a great hit", with the composer being "called out twice after it with great enthusiasm". An English translation, "When Jesus Christ was yet a child", was made by Geoffrey Dearmer and published in The English Carol Book in 1913.

== Legacy ==
The song was the basis of Anton Arensky's Variations on a Theme by Tchaikovsky, Op. 35a (1894), for string orchestra.
