= Alba Rosa Viëtor =

Italian musician (1889–1979)

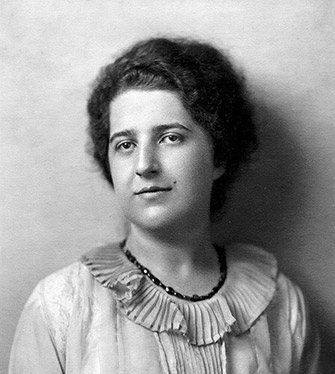
Alba Rosa Viëtor in 1919 (unknown photographer)

Alba Rosa Viëtor (July 18, 1889 – April 15, 1979) was an Italian-born violinist and composer who settled in the United States in 1919.

== Biography ==
Alba Rosa grew up in Milan, where she was admitted to the Milan Conservatory at the age of 8. She was the youngest student ever to be admitted. At the age of 14 she continued her studies in Brussels, after a short stay in Uruguay. Here she studied under the famed violinist César Thomson and later she studied under the creator of the Sevcik violin method, Otakar Ševčík. One of his notable students was Jan Kubelík, who would become her mentor and to whose memory she dedicated her Elegie. In 1919 she settled permanently in the United States, and married Jan Fresemann Viëtor, a Dutch businessman who was a skilled amateur violinist.

After a successful career as a violinist, in 1916 she played alongside Camille Saint-Saëns on piano during a tour in Argentina, she decided to end this and dedicated herself completely to composing.

After her divorce (the marriage was dissolved in 1940; Jan died in 1953 in Panama) she became a member of the National Association for American Composers and Conductors. She composed prolifically for orchestra, voice and various solo instruments. Several American orchestras and soloists including the National Gallery of Art Symphony Orchestra and the Frost Symphony Orchestra, have performed her works. Her compositions were performed in the same program as Charles Ives, Aaron Copland and John Philip Sousa by the National Gallery Orchestra in 1950.

The most important element that dominates all of Alba Rosa Vietor's work is not the form but rather the mood she wishes to convey. Lawrence A. Johnson calls one of her best known works, Primavera Lombarda (Springtime in Lombardy), "an intriguing moody Mediterranean tone poem".

After her death in 1979 her compositions fell into oblivion. Due to the initiative of her son Hendrik Viëtor to digitize the works of his mother, her works have been performed more frequently since 2003.

Her works have been archived by the Marta & Austin Weeks Music Library of the University of Miami.

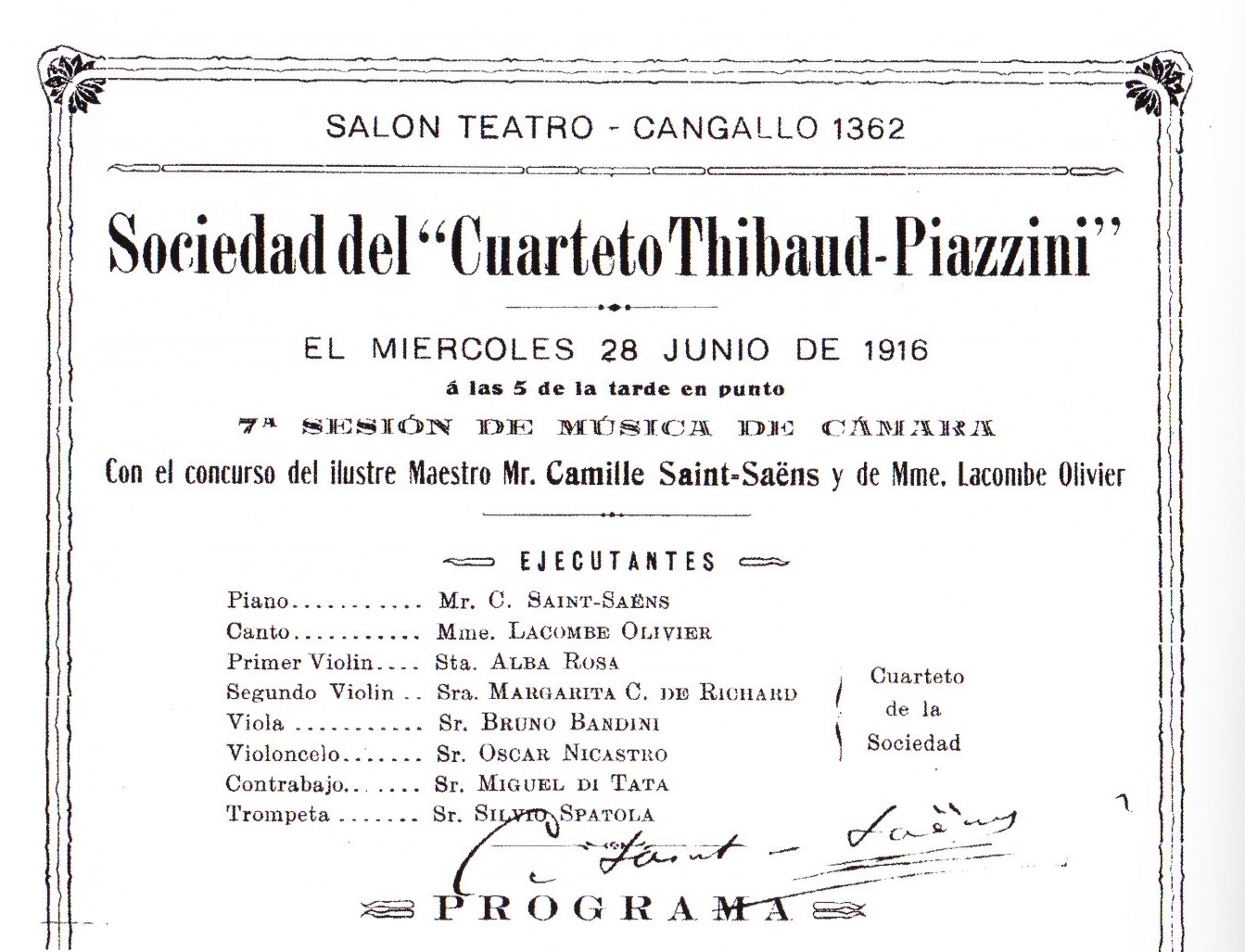
Alba Rosa Viëtor played with Saint Saëns in Argentina in 1916

== The Alba Rosa Viëtor Foundation and Alba Rosa Viva! chamber music festival ==
The Alba Rosa Viëtor Foundation was founded by Mary van Veen-Viëtor, Hermance Viëtor and Maarten van Veen in 2009 to promote knowledge of Rosa Viëtor's music and to encourage improvisation and composition, particularly by female composers. The Foundation has published a book, The Story of Alba Rosa Viëtor: Violinist and Composer 1889–1979 (2009), which includes essays about her works by Paul Janssen and Peter Fraser MacDonald, as well as a list of compositions. The Foundation have also released a CD with a recording of her Piano Trio Op. 8 by the Storioni Trio.

In 2014, the Foundation started a biannual chamber music festival, Alba Rosa Viva! This festival is not only intended to make the works of Alba Rosa heard, but also to draw attention to other female composers, whose works are rarely heard in the classical music halls. Some recent compositions are always part of the festival program. The Festival is an idea of artistic director Reinild Mees, who had already put Alba Rosa Viëtor’s music in the spotlight during the Women's Music Marathon in the Concertgebouw Amsterdam.

The Foundation also organizes the biennial Alba Rosa Viëtor Composition Competition for composers up to 35 years old, with a jury headed by composer Willem Jeths. The compositions of the finalists are performed during the festival.

== Compositions ==
=== Works for piano solo ===
- Capriccio 1914
- Piccolo Danza 1914
- Gavotte Rococo 1916
- Tema Fugato 1916
- Valse Lente 1916
- Studio (Etude) 1917
- Allegro Appassionato 1918
- Barcarola (A Jan) 1918
- Eileen’s Refrain 1935
- Indian Dance 1935
- Calma 1936
- Nocturne 1936
- Tin Soldiers 1936
- Truitje Danst op Klompies 1936
- Scherzo 1937
- Incertezza 1939
- Danse Grotesque 1946
- Sonata 1948
- Variations On London Bridge 1950
- Plainte Chromatique I+II 1951
- Playground 1951
- Preludio 1951
- Five Sketches 1953
- Children Singing 1965
- Making Money 1965
- Dreams 1965
- Billy’s Prayer 1966
- Frolics 1966
- Richiamo [Remembrance] 1972
- Pezzi 1973
- Dialogue 1977

=== Works for violin and piano ===
- Giuochi 1916
- Valse Romantique 1939
- Canzonetta 1939
- Elegie [in memory of Jan Kubelik] 1941
- Rhapsody 1952

=== Chamber music works ===
- Canzonetta 1939 piano, violin, cello
- Quintetto in La Minore 1940 piano, string quartet
- Duetto Fugato all’ Antica 1950 2 pianos
- Piano Trio in A minor 1951 piano, violin, cello
- Intermezzo 1952 violin I, violin II, viola, violoncello, double bass
- Little Suite 1952 piano, violin I, violin II
- Evening Bells 1956 carillon
- Chimes at Dusk 1956 violin, viola
- Four [Humoristic] Sketches 1957 piano, violin I, violin II
- Little Poem 1958 violin I, violin II, viola
- Recitativo 1959 violin I, violin II, viola
- Serenade In Pre-Modern Style 1961 timpani, harp, violin I, violin II
- Duet 1962 flute, clarinet
- Toddler at Play 1966 flute, violin, piano, percussion
- Billy’s Prayer 1967 flute, clarinet Bb, bassoon
- Four Pieces 1968 [2 instr.]
- Suite 1969 piano, flute, violin, violoncello
- Ritornello 1976 oboe, piano
- Tarantella 1976 oboe, piano

• Popolino 1979 clarinet, piano

=== Works for orchestra ===
- Primavera Lombarda 1949
- Mediolanum 1950
- The Blue Bird Suite 1951
- Symphonietta [Sinfonietta] 1959
- Ballet Suite (Tabloid) 1960
- Five Symphonic Sketches 1962

=== Vocal works ===
- To A Violinist 1940
- Wall Street [Text by Burton] 1940
- High Flight [Text by Magee] 1941
- Virgilian Spring [Text from Virgil] 1941
- Invocation 1945
- Forget Me Not (Text by Emily Bruce Roelofson)1945
- Dedication [Text by Roche] 1945
- Chiusa (Longing) 1947
- Rimpianto 1947
- Malia 1955
- To My Darling 1957
- The Meadow Lark 1958
- Nostalgia 1959
- Little Refrain 1960
- Two Choral Songs 1961
- My Birthday Song 1962
- L’orgoglio 1963
- Rhythm Song 1963
- Goodbye To Naples 1967
- Two Poems 1973

=== Popular works for piano ===
- Valse De Salon 1936
- Tango Habernera 1949
- Noche De Verano (Tango) 1949
- Paraphrase On “South Pacific” 1949
