= Richard Henry Stoddard =

American poet (1825-1903)

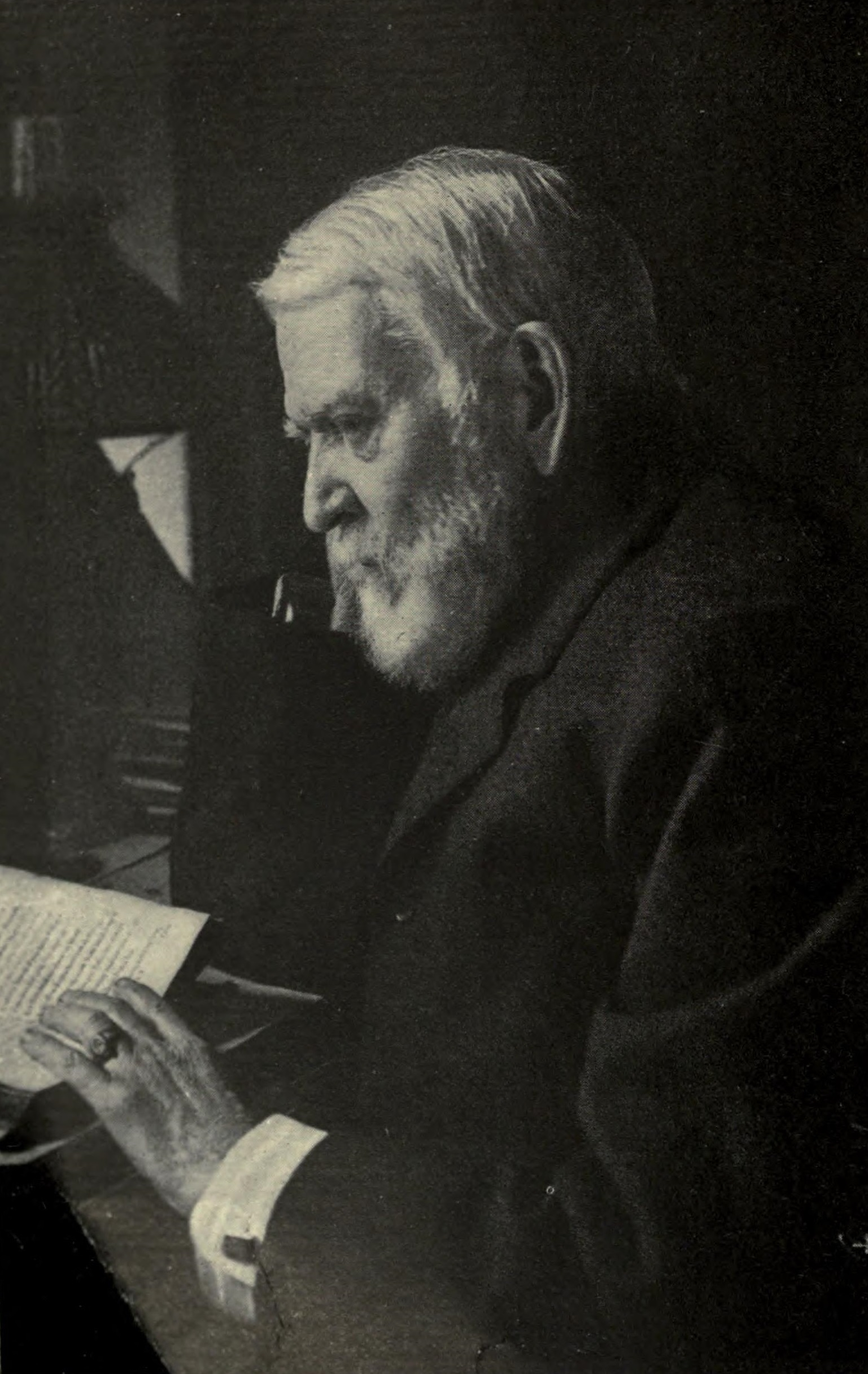
- Born: July 2, 1825; Hingham, Massachusetts
- Died: May 12, 1903 (aged 77); New York, New York
- Occupations: Critic, editor, poet
- Spouse: Elizabeth Drew Stoddard (née Barstow)

Richard Henry Stoddard (July 2, 1825 – May 12, 1903) was an American critic and poet.

== Biography ==
Richard Henry Stoddard was born on July 2, 1825, in Hingham, Massachusetts. His father, a sea-captain, was wrecked and lost on one of his voyages while Richard was a child, and the lad went in 1835 to New York City with his mother, who had married again. He attended the public schools of that city. He became a blacksmith and later an iron moulder, reading much poetry at the same time. His talents brought him into contact with young men interested in literature, notably with Bayard Taylor, who had just published his Views Afoot. In 1849 he gave up his industrial trades and began to write for a living. He contributed to the Union Magazine, the Knickerbocker Magazine, Putnam's Monthly Magazine and the New York Evening Post.

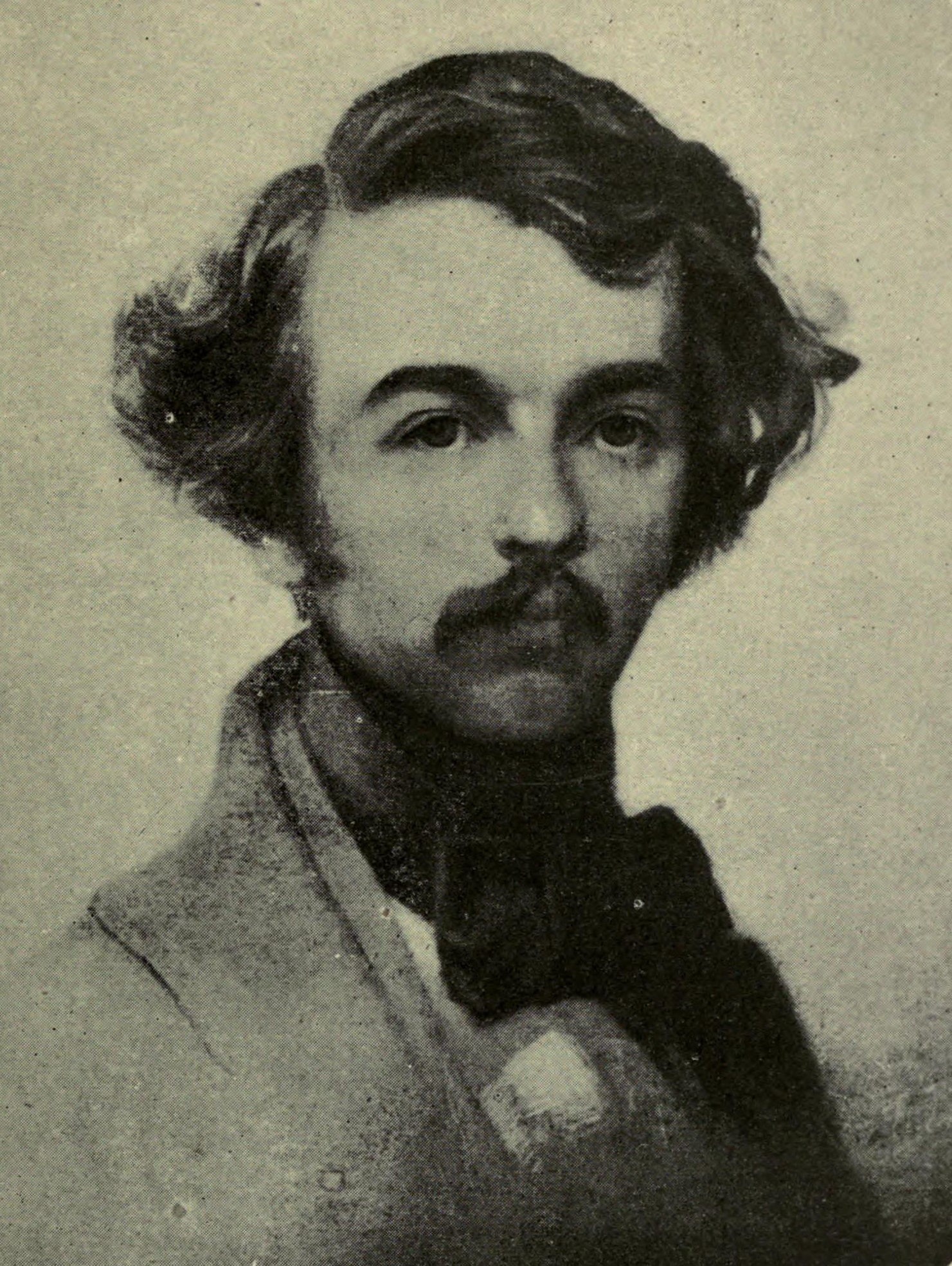
Portrait of a young Stoddard

He married Elizabeth Drew Barstow in 1852; she was also a novelist and poet. The next year, Nathaniel Hawthorne helped him to secure the appointment of inspector of customs of the Port of New York. He kept this job until 1870.

From 1870 to 1873, he was confidential clerk to George B. McClellan in the New York dock department, and from 1874 to 1875 city librarian of New York. He was literary reviewer for the New York World (1860–1870); one of the editors of Vanity Fair; editor of The Aldine (1869–1879), and literary editor of the Mail and the Mail and Express (1880–1903). He died in New York on May 12, 1903.

== Critical response and legacy ==
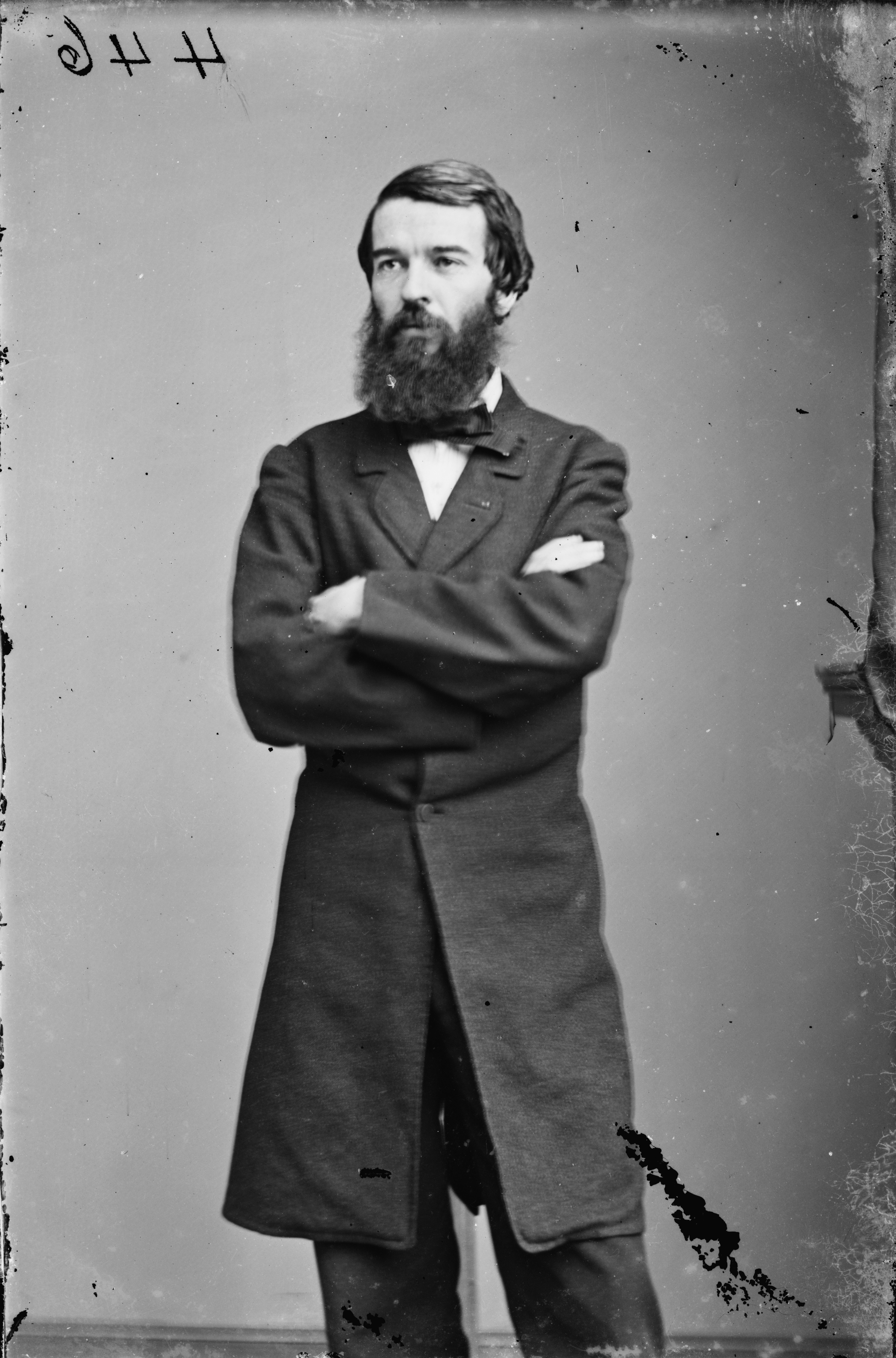
Photograph of Stoddard. Housed at Library of Congress.

In his parody of contemporary writers, The Echo Club (1876), Bayard Taylor placed Stoddard as one of the most important critics of the day, alongside James Russell Lowell and George Ripley. More important than his critical was his poetical work, which at its best is sincere, original and marked by delicate fancy, and felicity of form; and his songs have given him a high and permanent place among American lyric poets.

Stoddard’s 1856 poem "Roses and Thorns", in a Russian translation by Aleksey Pleshcheyev, was set for voice and piano by Pyotr Ilyich Tchaikovsky as "Legend", No. 5 from "Sixteen Songs for Children", Op. 54. The song, in turn, was the basis of Anton Arensky's Variations on a Theme by Tchaikovsky, Op. 35a, for string orchestra. Composer Addie Anderson Wilson set Stoddard’s poem “Under the Rose” to music for voice and piano in 1920. Composer Emily Bruce Roelofson used Stoddard’s text for her song “Sea Shell.”

== Bibliography ==
=== As editor ===
- The Loves and Heroines of the Poets (1861)
- Melodies and Madrigals, Mostly from the old English Poets (1865)
- The Late English Poets (1865), selections
- Griswold's The Poets and Poetry of America (1872)
- Female Poets of America (1874)
- The Bric-a-Brac Series, in 10 vols. (1874–1876)
- English Verse, in 5 vols., edited with W. J. Linton (1883)
- Four editions of Poe's works, with a memoir (1872–1894)

=== As poet ===
- Footprints (1849), privately printed and afterwards suppressed by the author
- Poems (1852)
- Adventures in Fairyland (1853)
- Town and Country (1857)
- The Story of Little Red Riding Hood (1864)
- Songs of Summer (1857)
- The King's Bell (1862), one of his most popular narrative poems
- Abraham Lincoln: An Horatian Ode (1865), published in The Lincoln Memorial: A Record of the Life, Assassination, and Obsequies of the Martyred President, New York: Bunce & Huntington, 1865, pp. 273–278.
- The Book of the East (1867)
- Poems (1880), a collective edition
- The Lion's Cub, with Other Verse (1890)

=== Prose ===
- Life, Travels and Books of Alexander von Humboldt (1860)
- Under the Evening Lamp (1892), essays dealing mainly with the modern English poets
- Recollections Personal and Literary (1903), edited by Ripley Hitchcock
