= Karl Merz =

American composer and author

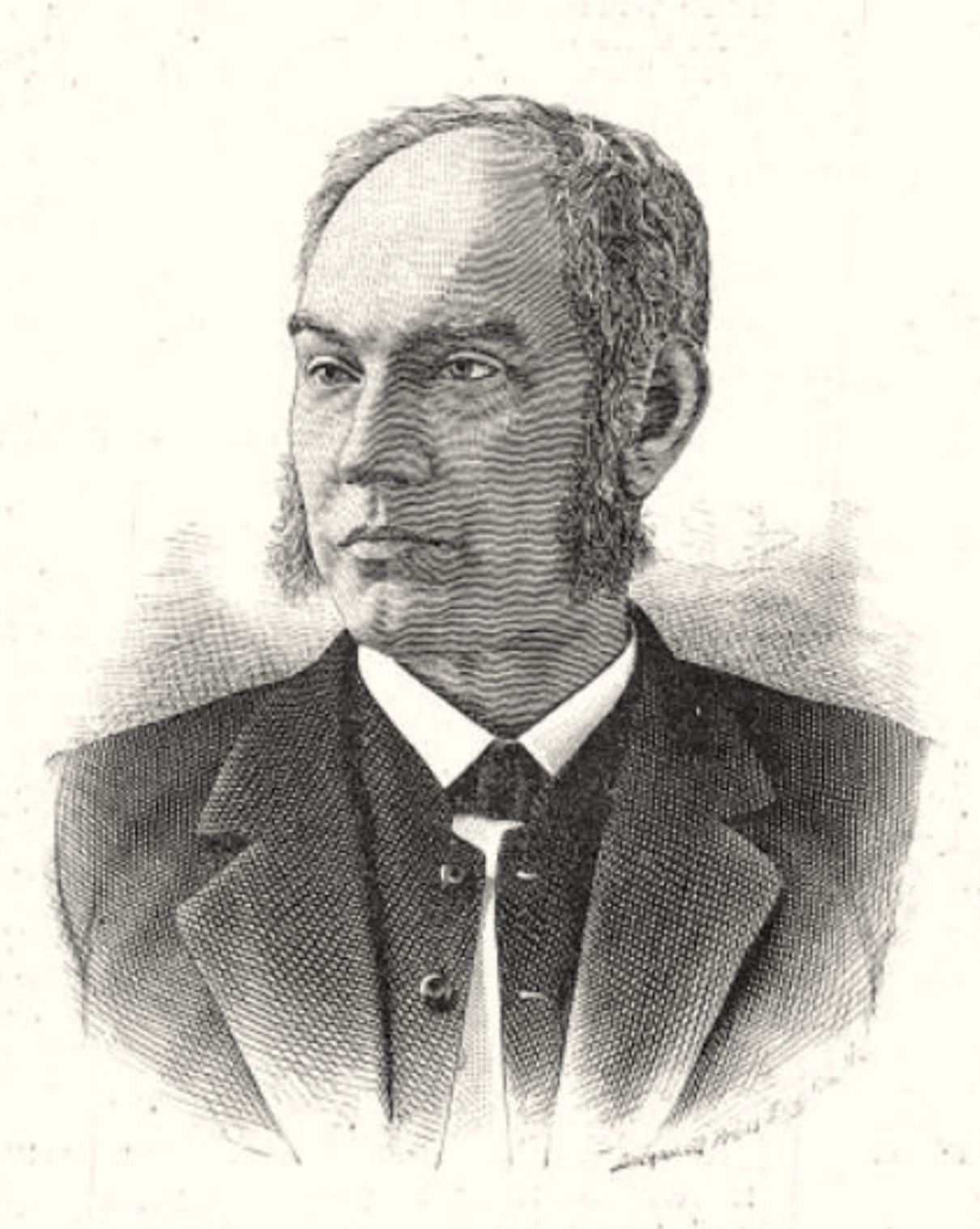
A sketch of Karl Merz that was published on the front cover of The Musical Courier on February 5, 1890.

Karl Merz (September 10, 1834 – January 30, 1890) was an American composer, author, editor, and arranger of German descent.

== Biography ==
Merz was born September 10, 1834, in Bensheim, near Frankfort-on-Main, Germany. (Note: His headstone has his birth year as 1836.). He received his early musical instruction from his father, a violinist and organist at the church in their hometown. But for the most part he is considered self-taught. By the age of eight or nine he was playing violin in a quartet club which met at the residence of Baron of Rodenstein. He is also known to have frequently played at "musical gatherings" at the castle of the baron of Rodenstein. At the age of eleven he had "assumed his father's duties as organist" at the church. He was educated at a seminary and graduated from college in 1853. For a year he taught school near Bingen am Rhein.

During a trip home he met a man from Philadelphia who invited him to the United States. Accepting the invitation he arrived in the U.S. in late 1854. After losing a job as a store clerk in Philadelphia because of his lack of English he found a place with a band of musicians. For a year he was an organist at the Sixth Presbyterian Church in Philadelphia.

Wolsieffer, who had a German musical journal, hired him as a critic for that publication.

In 1856 Merz went to Lancaster County, Pennsylvania. to teach at a seminary. Between 1859 and the beginning of the Civil War in 1861 he was somewhere in the South. After returning to the North, around September 1861 he became a professor of music at Oxford Female College in Oxford, Ohio.

As we enjoy sunsets the best when seen from our own porch, so music sounds sweetest in our own homes. As the simple words of the loved ones are sweeter than the most winning phrases of strangers, so music sounds sweeter if coming from the lips we love best. Yet music may lift us higher and higher, until the whole world appears as one family.-- From "Merz' Musical Hints" published in the "Moline Organ Instructor. A Complete Method for Parlor Organ. New Easy Method for the Reed Organ, Containing Complete and Thorough Instructions and a Choice Selection of Vocal and Instrumental Music" (1892).

He started his career as a musical writer in 1868 and made contributions to Brainard's Musical World. He became known for his "musical hints." As his popularity rose he was made assistant editor and in 1873 he became the sole editor.

In 1882 he relocated to Wooster, Ohio and founded and organized the Musical Department at Wooster University.

During his career he wrote a vast number of musical pieces consisting of operettas, sacred pieces, choruses, songs, piano solos, waltzes, dances, and pieces in almost every vocal and instrumental form.

Merz died in Wooster, Ohio on January 30, 1890

== Legacy ==
After his death a group of music lovers contributed $2,000 to purchase his library of approximately 1,450 titles and they became a part of the Carnegie Library of Pittsburgh.

== Works ==
A partial list of his works from "A Handbook of American Music and Musicians: containing biographies of American musicians, and histories of the principal musical institutions, firms and societies" (1886):

- Trio, for piano, violin, and violoncello with an arrangement for the andante for the piano
- Sonata in C minor, three movements of which are published as "L'Inquietude," "Eloge," and "La Belle Americaine"
- "La Tranquilité," andante for piano
- Caprice, for two violins and piano
- Elegy, for piano and violin
- "Bitter tears," two nocturnes
- "Welcome to the Hero," polonaise
- "Last Will and Testament," an operetta, first produced at Oxford, Ohio in 1877
- "Katie Dean," an operetta, first produced at Oxford, Ohio in 1882
- "The Runaway Flirt," an operetta, published in 1868
- Gypsey Chorus for Ladies' Voices
- "Great and Marvelous," chorus for six voices
- "Musical Hints for the Millions," containing 434 hints previously published in the "World' (1875)
- "Modern method for the Reed Organ" (1878)
- "Elements of Harmony and Composition" (1881)
- "Deserted," a song
- "The Stranger's Love," a song
- Six organ pieces
- "To the Golden Rays of Love," quartet
- "O Thou who driest the mourner's tears," quartet
- "Miriam's Song of Triumph," chorus

According to OCLC WorldCat Identities, Merz has 181 works in 284 publications in 2 languages, including:

- Karl Merz' Piano Method: A Complete Course Of Instruction For The Pianoforte, Karl Merz S. Brainard's Sons, 1885
- Music and culture : comprising a number of lectures and essays, Karl Merz, T. Presser, ©1890
- Last will & testament; a comic operetta designed for amateurs, Karl Merz, Cincinnati, Church, 1877.
- Karl Merz' improved modern method for the parlor organ : containing complete elementary department, exercises in all keys, hints to the pupils and teachers. Voluntaries, preludes, popular airs, waltzes and beautiful songs. To which is added a complete course of thorough bass instruction, Karl Merz, Chicago, Ill., S. Brainard, ©1880
- Catalogue of the Karl Merz Musical Library : held by the Academy of Science and Art, in trust for the Carnegie Free Library of Pittsburgh, Karl Merz Musical Library, Academy of Science and Art of Pittsburgh, Pittsburgh, Press of Chas. F. Foster & Co., 1892.
