= Arkady Abaza =

Russian composer, pianist, and journalist (1843–1915)

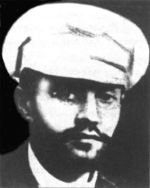

Arkady Maksimovich Abaza (Russian: Аркадий Максимович Абаза; 1843 in Sverdlikovo, Kursk Governorate – January 16 [O.S. January 3] 1915, in Kursk) was a Russian composer, journalist and pianist. He studied in St. Petersburg with Alexander Dreyschock for fortepiano and singing in the class of Camille Everardi. Later he was an associate of Hans von Bulow. He taught and was director of a music school in Sumy (1877–81) and then in Kursk (1882–1915). Among his students, at Kursk, was Nikolai Roslavets.

His most famous song is "Foggy Morning" (Утро туманное) to lyrics of Ivan Turgenev.

== Sources ==
- "Абаза, Аркадий Максимович" . Brockhaus and Efron Encyclopedic Dictionary (in Russian). 1906.
