= Camille Everardi =

Belgian operatic baritone (1824–1899)

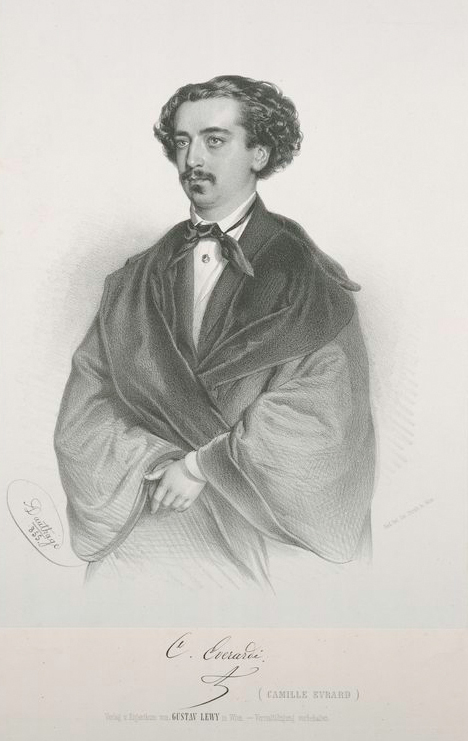
Camille Everardi (c. 1855)

Camille Everardi (1824–1899) was a Belgian operatic baritone who had an active international career during the 1850s through the 1870s. He particularly excelled in the works of Vincenzo Bellini and Gioachino Rossini. Several music critics of his day likened his voice to that of Antonio Tamburini. He later had a highly successful second career as a voice teacher in the Russian Empire.

== Biography ==
Born to parents of Italian descent, he studied at the Royal Conservatory of Liège in Liège and under Manuel García in Paris. He made his professional opera debut at the Teatro Nuovo in Naples in 1850 where he sang for two seasons. He sang at the Teatro Canobbiano in Milan in 1852 and in 1853 he made his first appearance at La Scala as Francesco in Verdi's I masnadieri. From 1853 to 1854 he was engaged at the Teatro Regio di Torino.

In 1855 Everardi returned to Paris to join the roster of principal singers at the Théâtre-Italien. He sang there for two seasons in such roles as Aliprando in Rossini's Matilde di Shabran and the title role in Mozart's Don Giovanni. In 1860 he was engaged at the Royal Opera, London where he portrayed Comte de Nevers in Meyerbeer's Les Huguenots, Elmiro in Rossini's Otello, Alphonse in Donizetti's La favorite, and Count Robinson in Cimarosa's Il matrimonio segreto. He also made several appearances at opera houses in Germany.

Beginning in 1853, Everardi made several lauded opera appearances in Russian opera houses. He eventually moved to Saint Petersburg during the late 1850s where he appeared at the Mariinsky Imperial Theatre until 1873, when he retired from the stage. He remained in Saint Petersburg working as a voice teacher for a few years, his students including the composer Arkady Abaza, before taking a position at the Kiev Conservatory. He eventually left Kiev to teach at the Moscow Conservatory where he remained until his death in 1899. A large number of his pupils went on to have major careers, including Nikolay Figner, Maria Slavina, Nikolay Speransky, Fyodor Stravinsky, Joachim Tartakov, and Dmitri Usatov.

== Sources ==
- "Эверарди, Камилло" . Brockhaus and Efron Encyclopedic Dictionary (in Russian). 1906.
- Everardi Biography at operissimo.com (in German)
