= Bildungsroman =

Coming of age literary genre

In literary criticism, a bildungsroman (Note: German pronunciation: [ˈbɪldʊŋs.ʁoˌmaːn]) is a literary genre that focuses on the psychological and moral growth and change of the protagonist as they progress from childhood to adulthood (coming of age). (Note: Manfred Engel writes that the term has been applied in recent years to very different novels, but originally meant a novel that depicted the formation of a character and of an individual interacting with society. He writes that it was, like the "novel of education" (Erziehungsroman), a subgenre of the "novel of development" (Entwicklungsroman).) (Note: Attributed to multiple references:) The term comes from the German words Bildung ('formation' or 'education') and Roman ('novel').

== Origin ==
The term was coined in 1819 by philologist Johann Karl Simon Morgenstern in his university lectures, and was later famously reprised by Wilhelm Dilthey, who legitimized it in 1870 and popularized it in 1905. The genre is further characterized by a number of formal, topical, and thematic features. The term coming-of-age novel is sometimes used interchangeably with bildungsroman, but its use is usually wider and less technical.

The birth of the bildungsroman is normally dated to the publication of Wilhelm Meister's Apprenticeship by Johann Wolfgang von Goethe in 1795–96, or sometimes earlier, to Christoph Martin Wieland's Geschichte des Agathon of 1767. Although the bildungsroman arose in Germany, it has had extensive influence first in Europe and later throughout the world. Thomas Carlyle's English translation of Goethe's novel (1824) and his own Sartor Resartus (1833–34), the first English bildungsroman, inspired many British novelists. In the 20th century, it spread to France and several other countries around the globe.

Barbara Whitman suggested that the Iliad might be the first bildungsroman. It is not just "the story of the Trojan War. The Trojan War is in effect the backdrop for the story of Achilles' development. At the beginning Achilles is still a rash youth, making rash decisions which cost dearly to himself and all around him. (...) The story reaches its conclusion when Achilles has reached maturity and allows King Priam to recover Hector's body".

The genre translates fairly directly into the cinematic form, the coming-of-age film.

== Plot outline ==
A bildungsroman is a growing up or "coming of age" of a generally naive person who goes in search of answers to life's questions expecting that these will gain them experience of the world. The genre evolved from folklore tales of a dunce or youngest child going out in the world to seek their fortune. Usually in the beginning of the story, there is an emotional loss that makes the protagonist leave on his journey. In a bildungsroman, the goal is maturity, and the protagonist achieves it gradually and with difficulty. The genre often features a main conflict between the main character and society. Typically, the values of society are gradually accepted by the protagonist, who is ultimately accepted into society—the protagonist's mistakes and disappointments are over. In some works, the protagonist is able to reach out and help others after having achieved maturity.

Franco Moretti "argues that the main conflict in the bildungsroman is the myth of modernity with its overvaluation of youth and progress as it clashes with the static teleological vision of happiness and reconciliation found in the endings of Goethe's Wilhelm Meister and even Jane Austen's Pride and Prejudice".

There are many variations and subgenres of bildungsroman that focus on the growth of an individual. An Entwicklungsroman ('development novel') is a story of general growth rather than self-cultivation. An Erziehungsroman ("education novel") focuses on training and formal schooling, while a Künstlerroman ("artist novel") is about the development of an artist and shows a growth of the self. Furthermore, some memoirs and published journals can be regarded as bildungsroman although claiming to be predominantly factual (e.g., The Dharma Bums by Jack Kerouac or The Motorcycle Diaries by Ernesto "Che" Guevara). The term is also more loosely used to describe coming-of-age films and related works in other genres.

== Examples ==
=== Precursors ===
- Hayy ibn Yaqdhan by Ibn Tufail (12th century)
- Parzival by Wolfram von Eschenbach (13th century).
- Sir Gawain and the Green Knight (14th century).

=== 16th century ===
- Lazarillo de Tormes (first edition 1554)

=== 17th century ===
- El Criticón by Baltasar Gracián (first edition 1651). Usually considered the pioneering work in its modern form.

=== 18th century ===
- Memoirs of a Woman of Pleasure (Fanny Hill) by John Cleland (1748)
- The History of Tom Jones, a Foundling by Henry Fielding (1749)
- Candide by Voltaire (1759)
- The Life and Opinions of Tristram Shandy, Gentleman by Laurence Sterne (1759)
- Geschichte des Agathon by Christoph Martin Wieland (1767)—often considered the first "true" bildungsroman
- Wilhelm Meister's Apprenticeship by Johann Wolfgang Goethe (1795–96)

=== 19th century ===
- Frankenstein by Mary Shelley (1818)
- The Betrothed by Alessandro Manzoni (1827)
- The Red and the Black by Stendhal (1830)
- Sartor Resartus by Thomas Carlyle (1833–34)
- Oliver Twist by Charles Dickens (1838)
- Agnes Grey by Anne Brontë (1847)
- Jane Eyre by Charlotte Brontë (1847)
- Wuthering Heights by Emily Brontë (1847)
- Netochka Nezvanova (unfinished) by Fyodor Dostoevsky (1849)
- David Copperfield by Charles Dickens (1850)
- Villette by Charlotte Bronte (1853)
- Green Henry by Gottfried Keller (1855)
- The Morgesons by Elizabeth Stoddard (1862)
- Great Expectations by Charles Dickens (1861)
- Little Women by Louisa May Alcott (1869)
- Sentimental Education by Gustave Flaubert (1869)
- Roderick Hudson by Henry James (1869)
- The Adolescent by Fyodor Dostoevsky (1875)
- The Portrait of a Lady by Henry James (1881)
- Treasure Island by Robert Louis Stevenson (1883)
- Adventures of Huckleberry Finn by Mark Twain (1884)
- Kidnapped by Robert Louis Stevenson (1886)
- What Maisie Knew by Henry James (1897)

=== 20th century ===
- Kim by Rudyard Kipling (1901)
- Beneath the Wheel by Hermann Hesse (1906)
- Martin Eden by Jack London (1909)
- The Book of Khalid by Ameen Rihani (1911)
- Sons and Lovers by D. H. Lawrence (1913)
- A Portrait of the Artist as a Young Man by James Joyce (1916)
- Demian by Hermann Hesse (1919)
- This Side of Paradise by F. Scott Fitzgerald (1920)
- The Magic Mountain by Thomas Mann (1924)
- Pather Panchali by Bibhutibhushan Bandyopadhyay (1929)
- Their Eyes Were Watching God by Zora Neale Hurston (1937)
- A Tree Grows in Brooklyn by Betty Smith (1943)
- The Catcher in the Rye by J. D. Salinger (1951)
- Invisible Man by Ralph Ellison, (1952)
- Children of Violence by Doris Lessing (1952–1969)
- In the Castle of My Skin by George Lamming (1953)
- A Separate Peace by John Knowles (1959)
- Goodbye, Columbus by Philip Roth (1959)
- To Kill a Mockingbird by Harper Lee (1960)
- Wake in Fright by Kenneth Cook (1961)
- The Emperor of Ice-Cream by Brian Moore (1965)
- Dune by Frank Herbert (1965)
- The Outsiders by S. E. Hinton (1967)
- A Wizard of Earthsea by Ursula K. Le Guin (1968)
- A Kestrel for a Knave by Barry Hines (1969)
- Maurice by E. M. Forster (1971)
- Bright Lights, Big City by Jay McInerney (1984)
- How to Kill a Bull by Anna-Leena Härkönen (1984)
- Ender's Game by Orson Scott Card (1985)
- Oranges Are Not the Only Fruit by Jeanette Winterson (1985)
- It by Stephen King (1986)
- Norwegian Wood by Haruki Murakami (1987)
- The Alchemist by Paulo Coelho (1988)
- English Music by Peter Ackroyd (1992)
- The Crow Road by Iain Banks (1992)
- Harry Potter by J. K. Rowling (1997–2007)
- The Perks of Being a Wallflower by Stephen Chbosky (1999)
- Naruto by Masashi Kishimoto (1999–2014)
- Persepolis by Marjane Satrapi (2000)

=== 21st century ===
- The Secret Life of Bees by Sue Monk Kidd (2002)
- The Kite Runner by Khaled Hosseini (2003)
- The Fortress of Solitude by Jonathan Lethem (2003)
- Vinland Saga by Makoto Yukimura (2005–2025)
- Never Let Me Go by Kazuo Ishiguro (2005)
- Indecision by Benjamin Kunkel (2005)
- Black Swan Green by David Mitchell (2006)
- Goodnight Punpun by Inio Asano (2007–2013)
- Indignation by Philip Roth (2008) (Note: Back of the French translation in the "Folio" collection (éditions Gallimard, 2010): "Avec ce roman d'apprentissage, Philip Roth poursuit son analyse de l'histoire de l'Amérique – celle des années cinquante, des tabous et des frustrations sexuelles – et de son impact sur la vie d'un homme jeune, isolé, vulnérable".)
- Sputnik Caledonia by Andrew Crumey (2008)
- Homestuck by Andrew Hussie (2009–2016)
- Neapolitan Novels by Elena Ferrante (2011–2014)
- A Silent Voice by Yoshitoki Ōima (2013–2014)
- Zuleikha by Guzel Yakhina (2015)
- Washington Black by Esi Edugyan (2018)
- Boy Swallows Universe by Trent Dalton (2018)

== See also ==
- Bildung
- Biographical novel
- Künstlerroman
- Memoir
- Mirrors for princes
- Roman à clef

== Bibliography ==
- Abel, Elizabeth; Hirsch, Marianne; Langland, Elizabeth (1983). The Voyage In: Fictions of Female Development. Hanover, NH: University Press of New England.
- Bakhtin, Mikhail (1996). "The Bildungsroman and its Significance in the History of Realism". In Emerson, Caryl; Holquist, Michael (eds.). Speech Genres and Other Late Essays. Austin, TX: University of Texas Press. pp. 10–59. ISBN 978-0-292-79256-2. OCLC 956882417.
- Bolaki, Stella (2011). Unsettling the Bildungsroman: Reading Contemporary Ethnic American Women's Fiction. Amsterdam and New York: Rodopi.
- Castle, Gregory (2006). Reading the Modernist Bildungsroman. Gainesville: University Press of Florida.
- Engel, Manfred (2008). "Variants of the Romantic 'Bildungsroman' (with a Short Note on the 'Artist Novel')". In Gerald Gillespie; Manfred Engel; Bernard Dieterle (eds.). Romantic Prose Fiction. A Comparative History of Literatures in European Languages. Vol. XXIII. Philadelphia: John Benjamins. pp. 263–295. ISBN 978-90-272-3456-8.
- Esty, Jed (2011). Unseasonable Youth: Modernism, Colonialism, and the Fiction of Development. Oxford University Press.
- Feng, Pin-chia Kingston A. (1997). The Female Bildungsroman by Toni Morrison and Maxine Hong Kingston: A Postmodern Reading. Modern American Literature: New Approaches. New York: Peter Lang.
- Foley, Barbar (1993). Radical Representations: Politics and Form in U.S. Proletarian Fiction, 1929–1941. Durham, NC: Duke University Press.
- Hegel, G. W. F. (1988). Aesthetics: Lectures on Fine Art, Volume One. Translated by T. M. Knox. Oxford: Clarendon.
- Iversen, Anniken Telnes (2009). Change and Continuity: The Bildungsroman in English (PDF) (PhD). University of Tromsø. Archived (PDF) from the original on 9 October 2022.
- Japtok, Martin Michael (2005). Growing up Ethnic: Nationalism and the Bildungsroman in African-American and Jewish-American Fiction. University of Iowa Press.
- Jeffers, Thomas L. (2005). Apprenticeships: The Bildungsroman from Goethe to Santayana. New York: Palgrave. ISBN 1-4039-6607-9.
- Karafilis, Maria (1998). "Crossing the Borders of Genre: Revisions of the Bindungsroman in Sandra Cisneros's the House on Mango Street and Jamaica Kincaid's Annie John". Journal of the Midwest Modern Language Association. 31 (2): 63–78. doi:10.2307/1315091. JSTOR 1315091.
- Komm, Katrin (1997). "Entwicklungsroman". In Friederike Eigler; Susanne Kord (eds.). The Feminist Encyclopaedia of German Literature. Wesport: Greenwood Press.
- Le Seur, Geta J. (1995). Ten is the Age of Darkness: The Black Bildungsroman. University of Missouri Press.
- Lynch, Jack (1999). "Glossary of Literary and Rhetorical Terms". Guide to Literary Terms. Rutgers University. Archived from the original on 5 August 2011.
- Minden, Michael (1997). The German Bildungsroman: Incest and Inheritance. Cambridge: Cambridge University Press.
- Moretti, Franco (1987). The Way of the World: The Bildungsroman in European Culture. London: Verso.
- Nyatetu-Waigwa, Wangari wa (1996). The Liminal Novel: Studies in the Francophone-African Novel as Bildungsroman. New York: Peter Lang.
- Otano, Alicia (2005). "Speaking the Past: Child Perspective in the Asian American Bildungsroman". Contributions to Asian American Literary Studies. Lit Verlag.
- Stević, Aleksandar; Prendergast, Christopher (2017). "Realism, the Bildungsroman, and the Art of Self-Invention: Stendhal and Balzac". A History of Modern French Literature. Princeton University Press. pp. 414–435.
- Summerfield, Giovanna; Downward, Lisa (2010). New Perspectives on the European Bildungsroman. London; New York: Continuum. ISBN 978-1441108531.
