= Dmitri Usatov =

Russian tenor and vocal teacher

Dimitri Andreevich Usatov

Dimitri Andreevich Usatov (February 22, 1847 - August 23, 1913) was a Russian tenor and vocal teacher. Born a serf to Dmitri Nikolayevich Sheremetev, he studied music with Camille Everardi at the Saint Petersburg Conservatory and sang at the Bolshoy Theatre from 1880 to 1889. There he sang the role of Lensky in Eugene Onegin in 1881 and the role of Andrei in Mazeppa in 1884. He later taught singing in Tbilisi, where his most famous pupil was Feodor Chaliapin, whom he not only trained, but fed, clothed and supported.

Usatov had a good relationship with the composer Pyotr Ilyich Tchaikovsky. In addition to the operas already mentioned, he performed songs by Tchaikovsky for the Russian Music Society in 1877, 1880 and 1882. At Usatov's request, Tchaikovsky orchestrated the song Legend from his Opus 54, "16 Children's Songs." In 1884, Tchaikovsky dedicated a song from his Opus 57, "Six Songs," to Usatov.

Usatov moved to Yalta in 1902 and died there in 1913. In gratitude for his training and support, Chaliapin supported Usatov's widow financially until her death.

A recording exists of Usatov singing Manrico's cabaletta (Di quella pira) from Verdi's Il Trovatore. It was recorded circa 1890 for Gianni Bettini and has remarkably good sound for its time.
