= The Lord Mayor of London (novel) =

1862 novel

- Author: William Harrison Ainsworth
- Language: English
- Genre: Historical
- Publisher: Chapman and Hall
- Publication date: 1862
- Publication place: United Kingdom
- Media type: Print

The Lord Mayor of London is an 1862 historical novel by the British writer William Harrison Ainsworth. It was published by Chapman and Hall but it was not initially illustrated, possibly to save costs following the disappointing sales of his previous novel The Constable of the Tower. The is set in the eighteenth century and follows the rise of the fictitious London businessman and politician Sir Gresham Lorimer who rises to become Lord Mayor during the early reign of George III. It features a number of real historical figures including William Beckford, John Wilkes and William Pitt the Elder.

== Bibliography ==
- Carver, Stephen James. The Life and Works of the Lancashire Novelist William Harrison Ainsworth, 1850–1882. Edwin Mellen Press, 2003.
- Mitchell, Rosemary. Picturing the Past: English History in Text and Image, 1830–1870. OUP Oxford, 2000.
