= Elizabeth Drew Stoddard =

American poet and novelist (1823-1902)

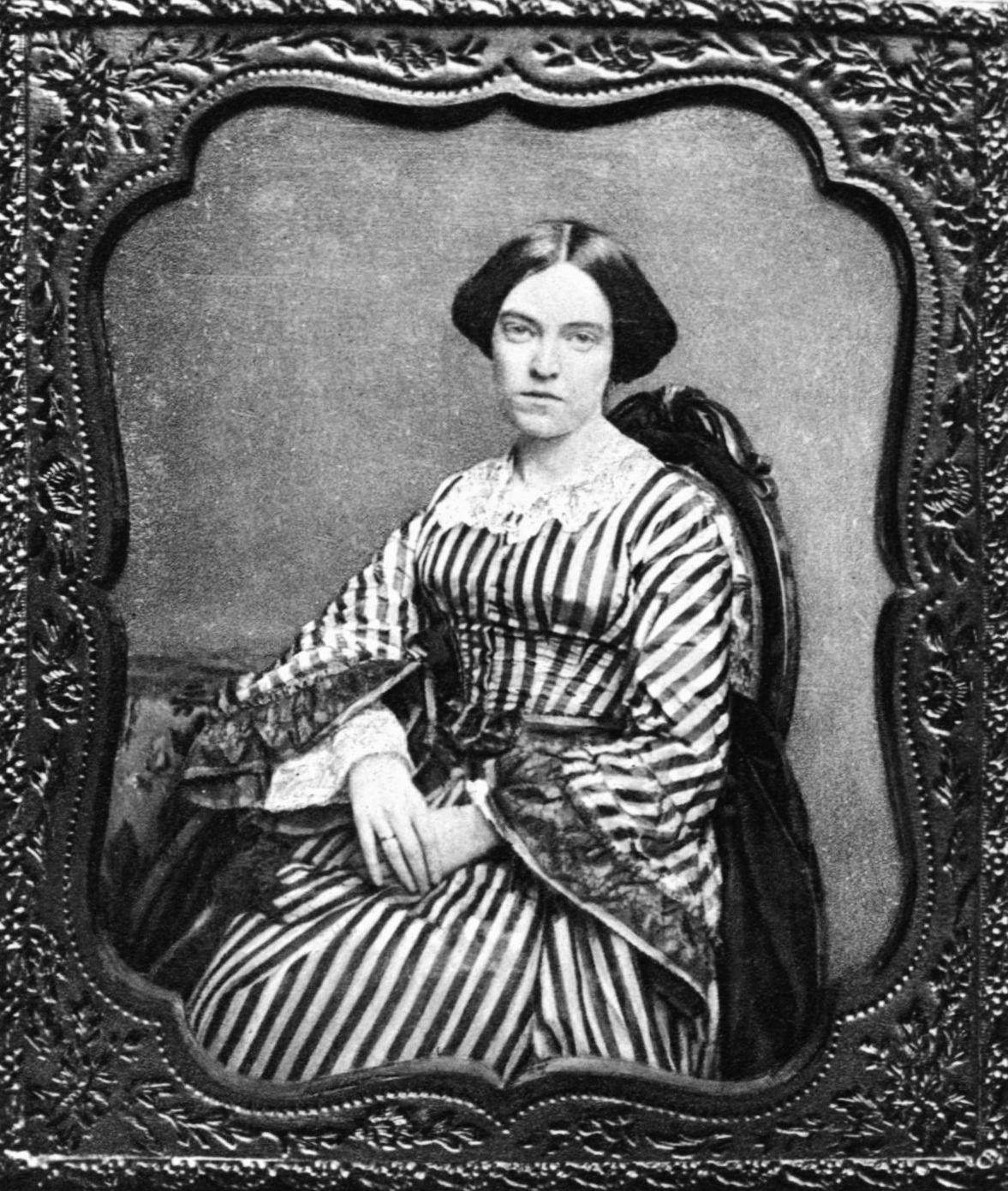
- Born: Elizabeth Drew Barstow; May 6, 1823 Mattapoisett, Massachusetts, U.S.
- Died: August 1, 1902 (aged 79) New York City, New York, U.S.
- Spouse: Richard Henry Stoddard

Elizabeth Drew Stoddard (née Barstow; May 6, 1823 – August 1, 1902) was an American poet and novelist.

Soon after her marriage to Richard Henry Stoddard, the author, she began to publish poems in all the leading magazines, and thereafter, she was a frequent contributor. Her verses were of a high order; she wrote for intellectual readers only. The numerous poems she published in periodicals were not collected in book form until Poems was published in 1895. In addition to her poetical productions, she published three novels: The Morgesons (New York City, 1862); Two Men (1865), and Temple House (1867). Those books did not find a large sale when first published, but a second edition, published in 1888, found a wider circle of readers. They were pictures of New England scenes and characters. In 1874, she published Lolly Dinks's Doings, a juvenile story.

== Early life and education ==
Elizabeth Drew Barstow was born May 6, 1823, in the small coastal town of Mattapoisett, Massachusetts. She received a thorough education in various boarding-schools and in her school-days showed her bent towards poetry and literature in general. She studied at Wheaton Seminary, Norton, Massachusetts.

== Career ==
After her marriage in 1852 to poet Richard Henry Stoddard, the couple settled permanently in New York City, where they belonged to New York's vibrant, close-knit literary and artistic circles. She assisted her husband in his literary work, and contributed stories, poems and essays to the periodicals. Many of her own works were originally published between 1859 and 1890 in such magazines as The Aldine, Harper's Monthly, Harper's Bazaar, and The Atlantic Monthly.

Stoddard is most widely known today as the author of The Morgesons (1862), her first of three novels. Her other two novels are Two Men (1865) and Temple House (1867). Stoddard was also a prolific writer of short stories, children's tales, poems, essays, travel writing, and journalism pieces.

Her work combines the narrative style of the popular nineteenth-century male-centered bildungsroman with the conventions of women's romantic fiction in this revolutionary exploration of the conflict between a woman's instinct, passion, and will, and the social taboos, family allegiances, and traditional New England restraint that inhibit her.

One major source of Stoddard's importance to American literature is the historicism of her work, the manner in which her writing embodied and subverted the tension of her present-day culture with the archetypal or received values of the American past. A pioneering predecessor of regionalist authors Mary Eleanor Wilkins Freeman, Sarah Orne Jewett, and Kate Chopin, as well as a precursor of American modernism, Stoddard's writing is remarkable for its almost total lack of sentimentality, pervasive use of irony, psychological depth of richly drawn characters, intense atmospheric descriptions of New England, concise language, and innovative use of narrative voice and structure. Her investigation of relations between the sexes, a dominant focus of her fiction, analyzes emotions ranging from love and desire to disdain, aggression, and depression.

== Selected works ==
- Stoddard, Elizabeth (1997). The Morgesons. Toronto: Penguin Classics. ISBN 0-14-043651-0.
- Stoddard, Elizabeth (1984). The Morgesons and other writings, published and unpublished. Philadelphia: University of Pennsylvania Press. ISBN 0-8122-7924-7. OCLC 10183456.
- Stoddard, Elizabeth (2008). Two Men. Lincoln: University of Nebraska Press. ISBN 978-0803293472.
