= S. Brainard Sons =

American musician

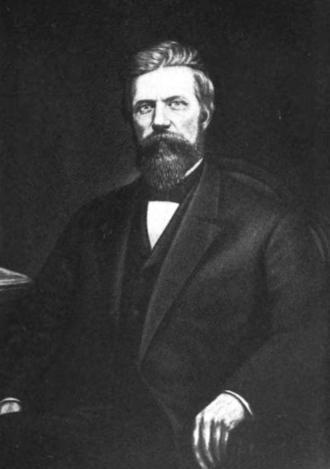
- Silas Brainard, founder

S. Brainard Sons (also known as S. Brainard's Sons and S. Brainard & Sons) was a music publisher, music periodical publisher, and musical instrument retailer based in Cleveland, Ohio and then Chicago, Illinois. The company was founded in 1836 by Silas Brainard (1814–1871) with Henry J. Mould (1816–1843). The business published music and songbooks including political and patriotic music. Brainard also published the periodical Western Musical World which was eventually renamed Brainard's Musical World. The Library of Congress has a collection of their sheet music. The New York Public Library has copies of their periodical in its collection.

== History ==
Brainard sold Chickering & Sons pianos. It acquired Chicago publisher Root & Cady's plates in 1871 after the Great Chicago Fire and eventually relocated to Chicago. After Brainard's death in 1871, the business passed to his two eldest sons, Charles Silas Brainard (1841–1897) and Henry Mould Brainard (1844–1918). His third, and youngest son, Arthur W Brainard (1861–1942), aged 10, was considered too young to partake in the family business. Throughout the 1870s and 1880s, Charles and Henry continued their father's work; publishing vocal and instrumental music, songbooks, and political and patriotic songs. During this time, Henry Mould Brainard opened his own shop in Cleveland as an outfit for Steinway pianos.

In the mid-to-late 1880's the Brainard family began to expand their businesses outside of Cleveland. In 1886, Arthur W Brainard, now a developer and businessman, moved to California, where he contributed in founding and building the city of Sierra Madre. In 1889, Charles Silas Brainard and Henry Mould Brainard moved the company out of Cleveland, OH and into Chicago, IL, where it would remain until the 1930s.

From 1899 until his death, Thomas Sidwell (1860–1909) was President of S. Brainard Sons. Upon his death, management was carried on by his widow, Katie (née Kate H. Sim; 1851–1936), who, on January 24, 1910, remarried – in Highland, New York – to Edward Albert Stege (né Albert Eduard Gustav Stege; 1861–1933) of Eldred, New York. Katie Stege (under the name K. Sidwell), Edward A. Stege, and C.C. Beekman, in early 1910, formed a corporation, "The Edward A. Stege Co.," printers, engravers, bookbinders, etc.

== Music periodical ==
The music journal was published from 1864 until 1895 when it was merged with Etude. The content of each issue included a musician's biography. The publication competed with Root and Cady's Song Messenger of the Northwest.

Karl Merz became an editor of Brainard's Musical World.

== Selected publications ==
- School Chimes, A New School Music Book (1874) written by the hymn composer James Ramsey Murray
- Six Songs (1863) composed by Emily Bruce Roelofson
- "Weston's March to Chicago" (1867), composed by Edward Mack; publisher: (List of songs about Chicago)
- "Keep the Horse Shoe Over the Door"
- Fanny Crosby's Six Songs by Wurzel (1855): "O How Glad to Get Home", "Honeysuckle Glen", "The Church in the Wood," "All Together Now", and "Proud World, Good-by". The most popular of these songs was "Rosalie, the Prairie Flower", about the death of a young girl. It was popularized in the 1850s by the Christy Minstrels; it sold more than 125,000 copies of sheet music and earned nearly $3,000 in royalties for Root —and almost nothing for Crosby.
- Francis Boott's "The Convict's Lullaby" (Henry Kirke White); revised 1874
- William Krell's "Mississippi Rag" January 27, 1897 and "Shake Yo' Dusters of Piccaninny Rag"
- Eben Eugene Rexford's "Rosa Lee" (1890), music by H. C. Verner
- Lucia di Lamermoor (1868), arranged by Justin Holland

== Gallery ==
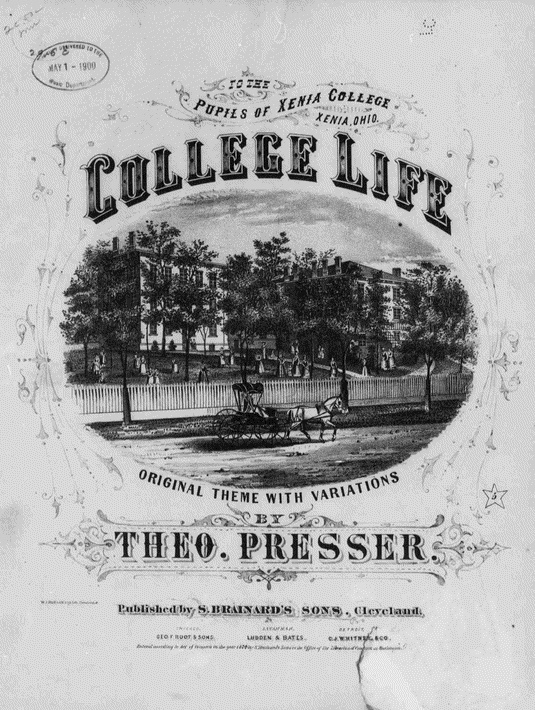

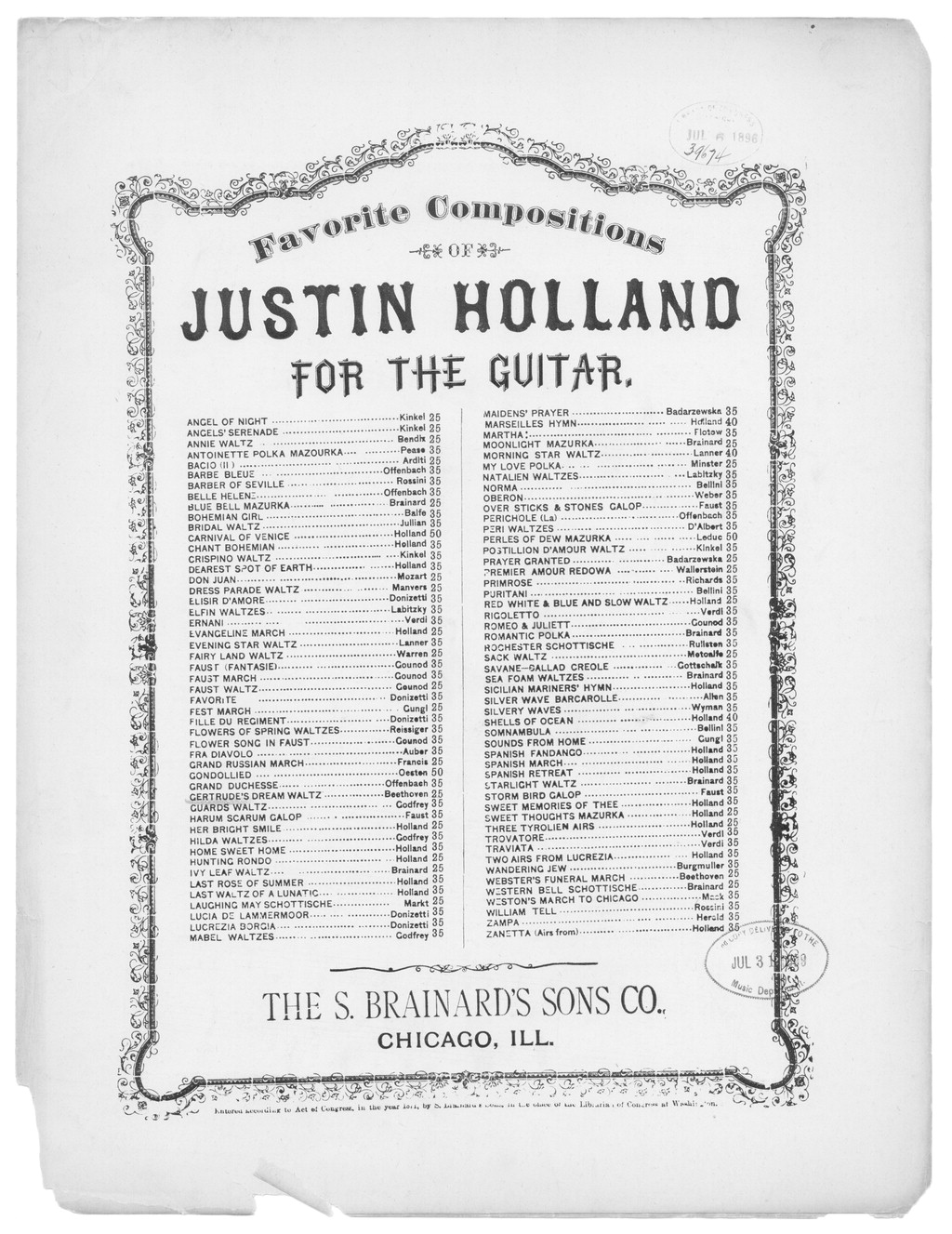
Guitar music published after the firm moved to Chicago

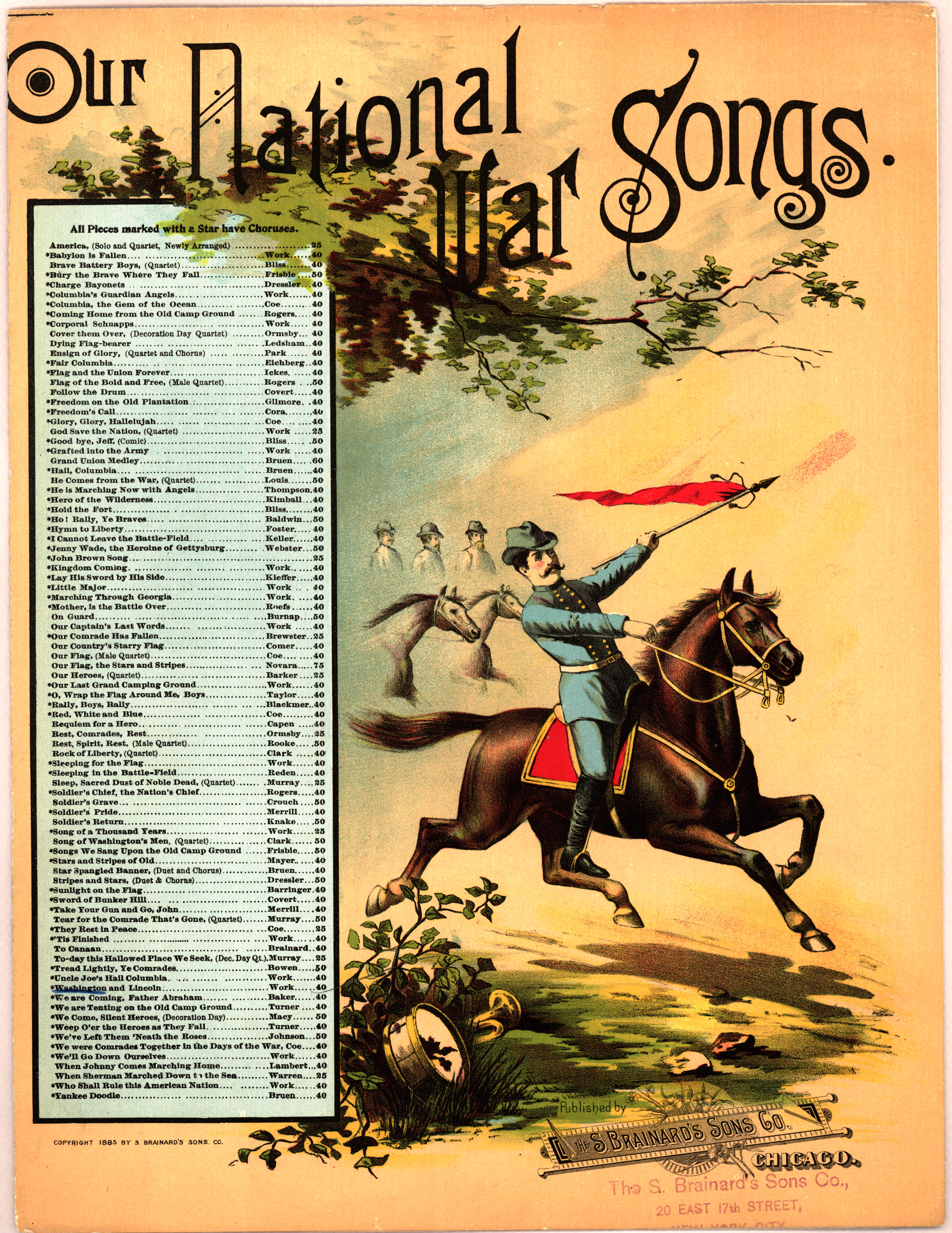

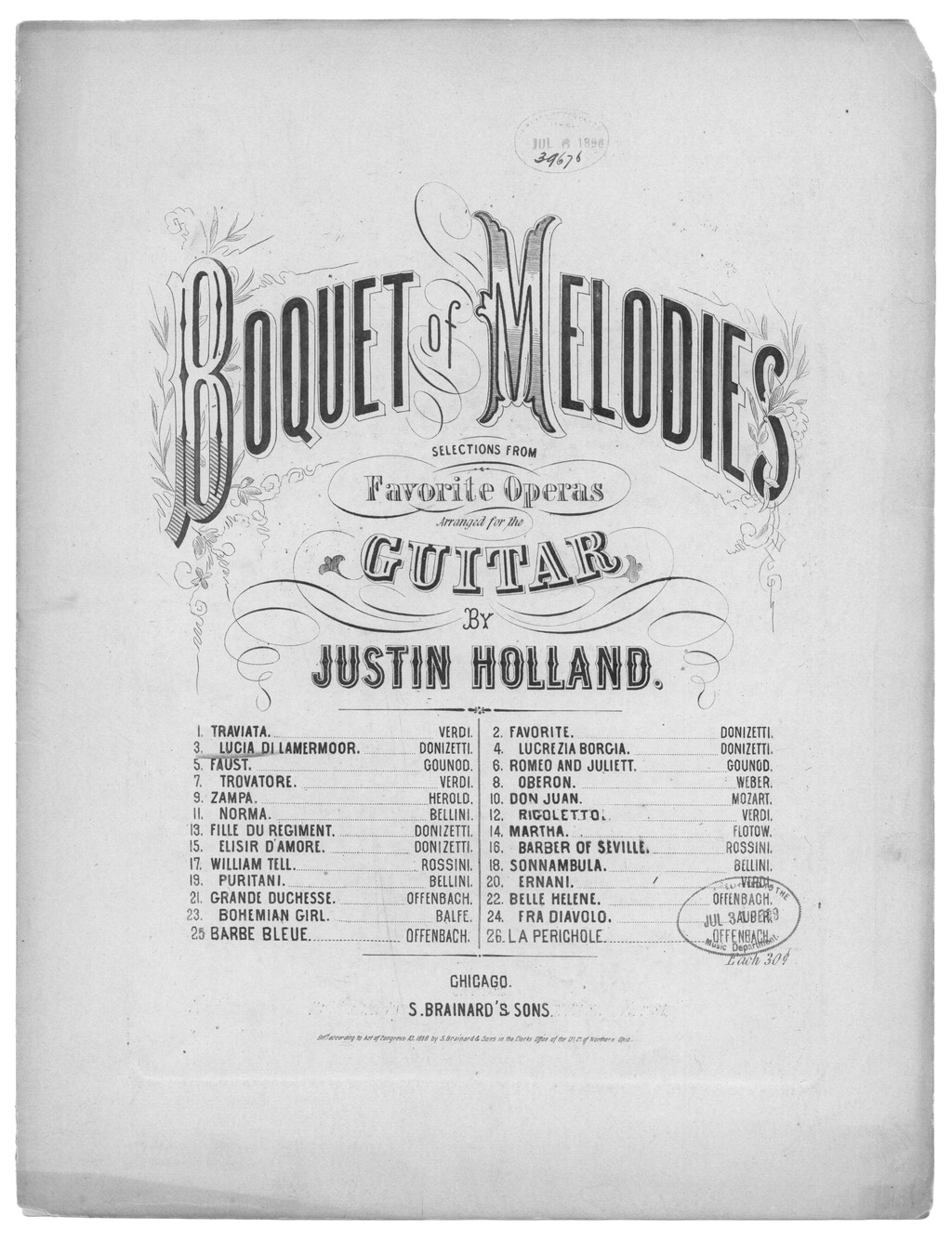
List of works from the 1868 cover of Lucia di Lamermoor, arranged by Justin Holland and published in Chicago by S. Brainard Sons

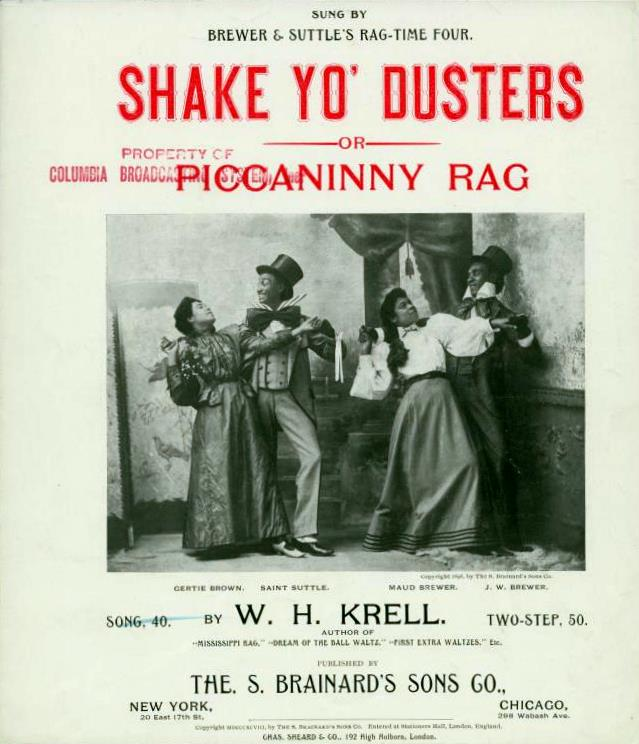
William Krell's "Piccaninny Rag", 1898
