= The Morgesons =

1862 novel by Elizabeth Drew Stoddard

The Morgesons is a novel written by Elizabeth Drew Stoddard and published in 1862. A female bildungsroman, it traces the quest of a young woman in search of self-definition and autonomy. The novel comments upon the oppression of women in mid-nineteenth-century New England and challenges the religious and social norms of the time.

== Plot summary ==
Stoddard's novel traces the education and development of a young female in American middle-class society. The protagonist, Cassandra Morgeson, is educated by a series of journeys she makes throughout her youth and early adulthood. Each new setting represents a different stage in her intellectual development.

Cassandra is born in Surrey, a small New England town. Surrey is quiet and isolated, granting a young woman little intellectual stimulation. Cassandra escapes the boredom of domestic life through stories of adventure and exploration. Surrey instills in Cassandra a restlessness that drives her quest for knowledge and experience.

At the age of thirteen, Cassandra is sent by her parents to live with her grandfather in Barmouth. Excessively religious, Grandfather Warren takes it upon himself to put Cassandra in her place. She is both intellectually and emotionally starved in Barmouth. Her life becomes narrowed down to home, school and church. In school, all the students dress alike and wear their hair in the same fashion. She learns an important lesson in conformity (peer pressure).

When Cassandra turns eighteen she is invited to stay with some cousins in Rosville. Rosville offers her a glimpse of city life. She attends numerous balls, whist parties and shopping sprees in Boston. She also falls in love with her cousin Charles. Charles's dark sensuality and power awakens Cassandra's sexuality, which is an integral part in her self-discovery. Cassandra quickly finds herself caught up in a passionate, adulterous love affair. Their affair is cut short in a tragic accident that costs Charles his life. Cassandra escapes with a scar across her face, which remains with her as a constant reminder of the affair.

Cassandra then travels to Belem, a city of wealth and nobility. She stays in the home of her friend, Ben Somers. In Belem she is forced to confront the social injustice of class. Here she falls for Ben's brother, Desmond. Desmond sees into Cassandra's heart through the scar on her face. He finds in Cassandra a reason to reform himself and conquer his alcoholism. He promises himself to her and then goes off to Spain to cure his addiction.

Upon her return to Surrey, Cassandra discovers that her mother has died. As the eldest and most capable daughter, the role of lady of the house is passed down to her. She becomes responsible for managing the household and taking care of her younger sister, Veronica. Cassandra resents her inherited role and envisions the rest of her days spent in monotony and misery. Her sister, Veronica, marries the wealthy but alcoholic Ben Somers. Two years after they are married, Ben dies of alcoholism, leaving Veronica to look after their child who “…never cries, never moves, except when it is moved” (252). Some critics see this child as a physical representation of how Veronica's search for independence and autonomy has been stunted by her marriage. In the close of the novel “her eyes go no more in quest of something beyond” (252).

Cassandra marries the newly reformed Desmond. Her quest for self-definition does not end with marriage though. Cassandra narrates the closing pages of the novel from her desk. She is in the process of writing her life story. Writing allows Cassandra to take an active role in defining herself. Her novel helps her to assert her autonomy and achieve her goal of self-possession.

== Primary characters ==
=== Cassandra Morgeson ===
Cassandra Morgeson is the protagonist of the novel. Young and beautiful, she goes on a quest to find herself and her place in mid-nineteenth-century America. She challenges the social and religious norms in her search for spiritual, sexual and economic independence.

=== Veronica Morgeson ===
Veronica Morgeson is Cassandra's younger sister. She has a pureness and otherworldliness that link her to the Virgin Mary. She experiences sudden fits of illness that incapacitate her for months at a time. Like Cassandra, she too is on a quest for autonomy, yet she finds herself too weak to combat the pressures of society.

=== Locke Morgeson ===
Locke Morgeson is Cassandra's father. He believes that his role as father is solely to be the provider. His dreams and life goals were passed down to him from his forefathers.

=== Mary Morgeson ===
Mary Morgeson is Cassandra's mother. She struggles with her role as mother, not sure she wants pass down a life of domesticity to her daughters.

=== Aunt Mercy ===
Aunt Mercy (or Merce) is Cassandra's aunt, her mother's sister. She is unmarried yet does not have any of the freedom associated with being single. She lives to take care of her father and has learned to cope with her role by shifting identities. Externally she conforms to every convention while internally she rebels against her role.

=== Grandfather Warren ===
Grandfather Warren is Cassandra's grandfather, her mother's father. Cold, ruthless and a religious patriarch, Grandfather Warren is oppressive and manipulative. He has crushed the dreams and hopes of his own daughters and attempts to do the same to Cassandra.

=== Charles Morgeson ===
Charles Morgeson is Cassandra's cousin and first love. He is dark, charming and powerful. He attempts to possess and tame Cassandra as if she were one of his wild horses.

=== Alice Morgeson ===
Alice Morgeson is Charles's wife. She is the perfect model of nineteenth-century womanhood. She is an obedient wife, a devoted mother and an extraordinary housekeeper. Towards the end she ends up remarrying, somewhat scandalously, Cassandra's father.

=== Helen Perkins ===
Cassandra's only true female friend throughout the novel. She meets her at school while staying in Charles' house in Rosville. She is engaged to her cousin, "a sailor," and has a tattoo of a bracelet with his initials (L.N.) on it around her wrist. She leaves school to take care of her sick father.

=== Ben Somers ===
Ben Somers is Cassandra's friend, Veronica's husband. He has inherited not only money but also alcoholism from his father. His alcoholism kills him before his prime.

=== Desmond Somers ===
Desmond Somers becomes Cassandra's husband at the end of the novel and is also Ben's brother. He is tall, dark, handsome and rebellious. He cures his alcohol problem to make himself a suitable husband for Cassandra.

== Major themes ==
Identity (self image)
Cassandra's main goal on her quest is to find out who she is and where she belongs. She struggles to identify herself because she is constantly being defined by others. Her position in her family assigns her a social class and gender roles. Her family also attempts to define her. In the opening scenes of the novel her aunt deems her “possessed” (5). Her sister Veronica says, “I want to classify Cass” (59). Stoddard often uses mirror scenes to symbolize Cassandra's search for identity. Throughout the novel, Cassandra looks at herself in mirrors (185). She recognizes that she has two irreconcilable identities. Externally Cassandra conforms to the conventions of society, yet internally Cassandra rebels against the very institutions to which she (sometimes) conforms (92).

Inheritance
Inheritance is a key theme in the novel. Stoddard demonstrates how inheritance can be both a blessing and a hindrance. Ben and Desmond Somers inherit both wealth and nobility from their ancestors, yet this wealth leads the young men to idleness and frivolity. Stoddard also shows inheritance as a grave disadvantage to women. Female children, like Cassandra and Veronica, inherit their domestic roles and values from their mothers. Sons inherit money. When Arthur, Cassandra's younger brother, is born, he automatically displaces Cassandra as the Morgeson heir. A household servant observes, “girls are thought nothing of in this [re]ligious section; they may go to the poor house, as long as the sons have plenty” (25).

Role of Women
Nineteenth-century women were expected to be faithful wives, devoted mothers, and dutiful housekeepers. Once they had fulfilled their duties as wives and mothers they were to pass those duties down to their daughters. Throughout the novel Cassandra's mother hesitates to rein in her young daughters. She seems unsure of whether she wants to force the same restrictions upon them that she herself had grown up under (27). To perform her duty is to set up for her children lives of domestic enslavement. At one point she asks Cassandra, “Should women curse themselves, then, for giving birth to daughters?” (133)

Sexuality
The ideal nineteenth-century woman was passionless. Stoddard challenges this ideal in her novel, insisting that sexuality is an important part in the protagonist's development. Cassandra's sexual awakening in Rosville provides her with a better understanding of herself and her own desires. Appetite becomes symbolic of her passion and sexuality. Cassandra is constantly hungry and never feels satisfied. Her insatiable hunger is symbolic of her sexual desire. The sea too represents Cassandra's sexuality. She notices the sea “murmuring softly, creeping along the shore, licking the rocks and sand as if recognizing a master” (63).

Possession
The novel plays on the word "possession." Possession refers to both ownership and, possibly, demonic possession. Cassandra is introduced to the reader as “possessed.” Her possession is associated with her refusal to accept social norms. Women who went against the conventional roles of womanhood (angel, healer, wife, and mother) could be deemed either sinful or insane. Stoddard also uses the word "possession" to show control or ownership. Women in this time period were often controlled by men. They frequently had no means to support themselves and could be completely dependent on men for their survival. At one point in the novel Cassandra is in danger of being possessed by Charles.

The Sea
This location is where Cassandra gains her strength. "The inland scenery was tame...Seaward it was enchanting--beautiful under the sun and moon and clouds" (8). At the end of the novel, the sea is where she finds her strength to go on living. “’Have then at life!’ my senses cried. ‘We will possess its longing silence, rifle its waiting beauty. We will rise up in its light and warmth, and cry, 'Come, for we wait.' Its roar, its beauty, its madness--we will have—all.’”(214).

== Setting ==
Surrey
Cassandra’s hometown. Provincial and repressive, Surrey hinders Cassandra’s intellectual and emotional development. A kind of New England backwater, Surrey allows little room for exploration.

Barmouth
Cassandra’s grandfather’s home. Religious and stifling, Barmouth pushes Cassandra to conform to conventions and embrace her domestic role.

Rosville
Home of Alice and Charles Morgeson. Rosville is secular, materialistic and urbanized. Rosville is in complete contrast to the religious and repressive Surrey and Barmouth.

Belem
Home of Ben and Desmond Somers. Stoddard based the fictional Belem on Salem, Massachusetts. Belem is matriarchal, elitist, and wealthy.

== Critical reception ==
Stoddard's works were not widely read during her lifetime. The novel was lost to literary history for over a hundred years, perhaps because of scholars’ inability to categorize it. Yet The Morgesons has since become an important part of the canon of American literature.
