= Perronet =

Perronet is a surname and given name. Notable people with the name include:

- Henry Perronet Briggs RA (1793–1844), English painter of portraits and historical scenes
- Edward Perronet (1721–1792), worked with John and Charles Wesley in England's 18th-century Christian revival
- Jean-Rodolphe Perronet (1708–1794), French architect and structural engineer known for his many stone arch bridges
- Joanni Perronet (1877–1950), French painter and fencer
- Vincent Perronet (1693–1785), Anglo-Swiss clergyman of the Church of England, vicar of Shoreham, early Methodist
- John Perronet Thompson, KCSI, KCIE (1873–1935), British administrator in India
- Thomas Perronet Thompson (1783–1869), British Parliamentarian, a governor of Sierra Leone and radical reformer
- Perronet de Villamastray, bailli of the Principality of Achaea for Prince John of Gravina from November 1322 until 1323

== See also ==
- Perronet House, 11-storey residential council tower block near the Elephant and Castle, in London
- Perronet Thompson School, secondary school in Kingston upon Hull, England
