= All Hail the Power of Jesus' Name =

Christian hymn

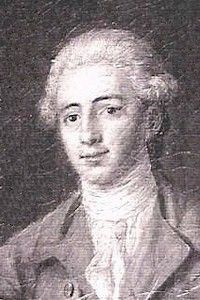
- Edward Perronet
- Genre: Hymn
- Text: Edward Perronet
- Meter: 8.6.8.6.8.6
- Melody: "Coronation" (Holden), "Miles Lane" (Shrubsole), "Diadem" (Ellor)
- Published: 1779

"All Hail the Power of Jesus' Name" is a Christian hymn.

The hymn has been called the "National Anthem of Christendom". The lyrics, written by Edward Perronet, first appeared in the November, 1779 issue of the Gospel Magazine, which was edited by the author of "Rock of Ages", Augustus Toplady.

The song was heavily altered for the Unitarian hymnal, which was also licensed to the hymnal of the Unity Church: "All Hail the Power of Truth to Save from Error's Binding Thrall."

Bing Crosby included the hymn in his 1951 album Beloved Hymns.

== Text ==
The original had eight stanzas, but it is often shortened in modern hymnals; for example:

1 All hail the power of Jesus' name!
Let angels prostrate fall.
Bring forth the royal diadem,

Refrain:
and crown him, crown him, crown him,
crown him Lord of all!

2 O seed of Israel's chosen race
now ransomed from the fall,
hail him who saves you by his grace, Refrain

3 Let every tongue and every tribe
responsive to his call,
to him all majesty ascribe, Refrain

4 Oh, that with all the sacred throng
we at his feet may fall!
We'll join the everlasting song. Refrain

== Tunes ==
The hymn is sung to a variety of tunes. "Coronation" (Oliver Holden, 1793) is most common in the United States.

"Miles Lane" (William Shrubsole, 1779) was originally associated with the tune in Britain. It first appeared in the Gospel Magazine (November 1779) as a three part arrangement with a figured bass. The "striking refrain" originally began as a series of ascending exclamations by solo voices, but this was later fully harmonised in four parts in Hymns Ancient and Modern and endures as such in modern hymnals.

"Diadem" (James Ellor, 1838) is also a popular alternative, although Methodist scholar Carlton Young notes that the "tune is sometimes described as a choral anthem", due to the repetition of the refrain "Crown him!" in running passages between the voices.
