= Beloved Hymns =

Beloved Hymns Sung by Bing Crosby

Studio album by Bing Crosby
- Released: 1951
- Recorded: 1949
- Genre: Religious
- Length: 23:50
- Label: Decca

Bing Crosby chronology
Country Style (1951)	Beloved Hymns Sung by Bing Crosby (1951)	Bing and Connee (w/ Connie Boswell) (1952)

Beloved Hymns is the thirteenth solo studio album by American singer and actor Bing Crosby released in 1951 featuring eight hymns recorded with the Ken Darby Choir and organ accompaniment on May 6, 1949.

== Reception ==
Crosby researcher Fred Reynolds said of the recording session at which all eight hymns were recorded, “They were all sung devoutly without any pretence of 'performance,' but nevertheless gave added support to Martin Luther’s dictum that the devil should not have all the best tunes.”

Billboard reviewed some of the individual songs released as 78 rpm records.

"What a Friend We Have In Jesus" – " Choir and organ support Bing ably as he delivers a beautiful hymn simply, straightforwardly and with deep warmth."

"O Lord, I Am Not Worthy" – " Bing rarely has sung better and with more feeling than he shows on this hymnal selection. "

== Album releases ==
The songs were featured on a 10-inch vinyl LP numbered DL 5351 and in a 4-disc 45 rpm box set numbered 9-258.

== LP track listing ==
Side one
No.	Title	Writer(s)	Length
1.	"He Leadeth Me"	Joseph H. Gilmore, William B. Bradbury	2:52
2.	"What a Friend We Have in Jesus"	Charles Crozat Converse, Horatius Bonar, Joseph Scriven	3:06
3.	"Rock of Ages Cleft for Me"	Thomas Hastings, Augustus Toplady	3:00
4.	"All Hail the Power of Jesus' Name"	Edward Perronet, Oliver Holden	2:52

Side two
No.	Title	Writer(s)	Length
1.	"Holy, Holy, Holy, Lord God Almighty"	John B Dykes, Reginald Heber	3:02
2.	"O God, Our Help in Ages Past"	William Croft, Isaac Watts	2:38
3.	"Mother Dear, O Pray For Me"	Traditional	2:59
4.	"O Lord, I Am Not Worthy"	Traditional	3:21
