= Hugh Smith =

Hugh Smith may refer to:

- Hugh Smith (American football) (1934–2016), American football wide receiver
- Hugh Smith (politician) (1839–?), Ontario farmer and political figure
- Hugh Smith (cricketer) (1856–1939), English cricketer
- Hugh Smith (swimmer) (1910–?), British swimmer
- Hugh Smith (news anchor) (1934–2007), news director and anchor at Tampa, Florida's WTVT
- Hugh Smith (physician) (died 1790), English medical writer
- Hugh McCormick Smith (1865–1941), American ichthyologist and administrator in the Bureau of Fisheries
- Albert Hugh Smith (1903–1967), English philologist
- Hugh Colin Smith (1836–1910), Governor of the Bank of England
- Hugh McClure Smith (1902–1961), Australian public servant and diplomat
- Hugh J. Smith (died 1908), member of the Los Angeles City Council
- Hugh Smith (priest) (1896–?), Chaplain-General of Prisons
- Sir Hugh Smith, 1st Baronet (1632–1680), English politician
- Hugh Crawford Smith, British Member of Parliament for Tyneside, 1900–1906

== See also ==
- Huw Smith, guitarist
- Hugh Smyth (disambiguation)
