= Hugh Smyth (disambiguation) =

Hugh Smyth (born 1941) is a Northern Irish politician.

Hugh Smyth may also refer to:

- Hugh Lyle Smyth (1833–1911), merchant, JP and High Sheriff of Cheshire
- Hugh Smyth, local historian on the TV series On the Street Where You Live

== See also ==
- Hugh Smith (disambiguation)
- Hugh H. Smythe, American author, sociologist, diplomat and professor
