= William Sykes (priest) =

Anglican priest

William Sykes (24 July 1861 – 24 August 1930), born in Barrow-in-Furness, was first Curate of St John's Church, Tunbridge Wells; Vicar of Hillsborough and Wadsley Bridge, Sheffield, 1895–1919; Vicar of Audley, Staffordshire, 1919–1928; first President of the Sovereign Grace Union 1913–1930.

According to the "Short Sketch of the Life of the Author" in the 1932 edition of "The Salt of the Covenant" (a volume of his sermons), he was a prominent Orangeman and towards the end of his life "was made a Freemason of the Motherland Lodge in London."

He married Anne Jane Dodgson, 1885, who died in 1916; they had five sons and three daughters, their second son being William Dodgson-Sykes, rector of St Mary le Port Church, Bristol, editor of The Gospel Magazine and Principal of the Bible Churchmen's Missionary and Theological College.

He then married Emily Bartlett Knocker, in 1918, who survived him, dying in 1934.
