= Fencing at the 1896 Summer Olympics – Men's masters foil =

Fencing at the Olympics

Men's masters foil at the Games of the I Olympiad
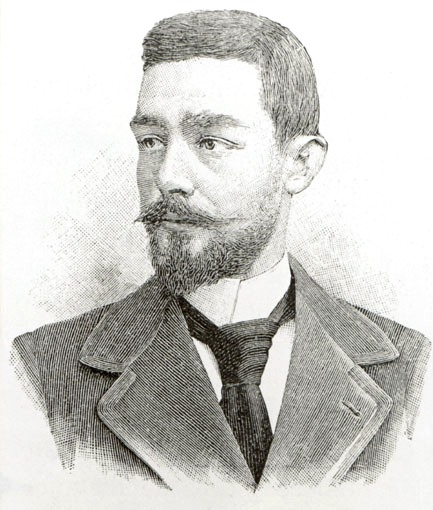
- Leonidas Pyrgos
- Venue: Zappeion
- Date: 7 April 1896
- Competitors: 2 from 2 nations

Medalists
1st place, gold medalist(s)		Leonidas Pyrgos; Greece
2nd place, silver medalist(s)		Joanni Perronet; France

The men's masters foil was one of three fencing events on the Fencing at the 1896 Summer Olympics programme. It was the only event at the Games for professional athletes and was held immediately after the amateur event on 7 April. It consisted of a single match, between Leonidas Pyrgos of Greece and Joanni Perronet of France. Pyrgos won the match, 3–1, to become the first Greek champion in the modern Olympics.

== Background ==
This was the first appearance of the event, which was held only once more. Fencing masters were an exception to the amateurs-only nature of the early Olympics. Masters fencing was held as an Olympic event in 1896 (men's foil only) and 1900 (all three weapons for men, as well as a special event in épée that pitted the top professionals against the top amateurs). By 1904, only amateur events were conducted.

== Competition format ==
With only two fencers, the competition consisted of a single bout. The bout was to three touches. Standard foil rules were used, including that touches had to be made with the tip of the foil, the target area was limited to the torso, and priority determined the winner of double touches.

== Schedule ==
The exact time of the master's event is not known. The fencing began at 10 a.m. on the second day of events with the (amateur) men's foil, followed by the master's foil. The Official Report notes that the fencing ended at noon.

Date		Time	Round
Gregorian	Julian	Time	Round
Tuesday, 7 April 1896	Tuesday, 26 March 1896	Late morning	Semifinals; Final

== Results ==
Pyrgos won the only bout, 3–1.

Pos	Fencer	W	L	TF	TA	LP	JP
1st place, gold medalist(s)	Leonidas Pyrgos (GRE)	1	0	3	1		3–1
2nd place, silver medalist(s)	Joanni Perronet (FRA)	0	1	1	3	1–3	

Source: Olympedia
