= William Bingley =

British cleric, naturalist, and writer

William Bingley (January 1774 – 11 March 1823) was an English cleric, naturalist and writer.

== Life ==
Bingley was born at Doncaster, and left an orphan at an early age. In 1795 he entered Peterhouse, Cambridge, and took the degree of B.A. in 1799, and of M.A. in 1803. Whilst an undergraduate he travelled in Wales in 1798. He made the first rock climb there of Clogwyn Du'r Arddu, with Peter Bailey Williams, the first British and documented climb of its kind.

For many years after ordination Bingley served the curacy of Christchurch, Hampshire. In 1816 he was the minister of the Fitzroy Chapel, Charlotte Street, London; he was engaged in its ministry at the time of his death. He died in Charlotte Street, 11 March 1823 aged 49, and was buried in a vault under the middle aisle of Bloomsbury Church. He was a fellow of the Linnean Society, and led a quiet life.

== Works ==
Bingley was a prolific writer, and several of his works were popular. His Tour round North Wales, the result of his college vacation of 1798, was published in 1800 in two volumes. He revisited the district in 1801, and in 1804 issued North Wales ... delineated from two excursions. A second edition appeared in 1814, and a third, with corrections and additions by his son, William Richard Bingley, in 1839. As a companion to these works there appeared a volume entitled Sixty of the most admired Welsh Airs, collected by W. Bingley, arranged for the piano by William Russell in 1803, and again in 1810.

One of the most popular of Bingley's compilation was Animal Biography (1803), on natural history. The sixth edition appeared in 1824, and the work was translated into several European languages. A related volume Memoirs of British Quadrupeds, appeared in 1809. His Practical Introduction to Botany was published in 1817, and republished after the author's death in 1827. In 1814 he drew up a volume on Animated Nature, and two years later he compiled a work on Useful Knowledge, an account of the various productions of nature, mineral, vegetable, and animal, frequently reissued with the seventh edition appearing in 1862.

One set of Bingley's works was composed of "biographical conversations"; he narrated the lives of 'British characters,' 'eminent voyagers,' 'celebrated travellers,' and 'Roman characters.' Another consisted of condensed accounts "from modern writers" of Africa, South America, North America, South Europe, North Europe, and Asia, in six volumes appearing between 1819 and 1822. They were reproduced with a general title-page of Modern Travels.

A planned county history of Hampshire took up much of Bingley's time; it had backing from Brownlow North. In 1817, when the manuscripts amounted to 6,000 pages, he had to explain the delay to subscribers. Thirty copies of a small portion of it, The Topographical Account of the Hundred of Bosmere, were printed for private circulation.

Bingley's dictionary of Musical Biography appeared anonymously in 1814; it was reissued with his name on the title-page in 1834. At Christchurch he published (1805), from the originals in the possession of a Wiltshire lady, three volumes of Correspondence between Frances, Countess of Hereford, and the Countess of Pomfret, 1738-41. Most of the copies of the second edition were destroyed by fire. He also wrote a sermon on the Economy of a Christian Life (1822), and a handbook to the Leverian collection.

== Notes ==
Attribution

This article incorporates text from a publication now in the public domain: Stephen, Leslie, ed. (1886). "Bingley, William". Dictionary of National Biography. Vol. 5. London: Smith, Elder & Co.
