= William Mason (religious writer) =

English Calvinist writer 1719–1791)

William Mason (1719 – 29 September 1791) was a Christian Calvinist writer from England.

Mason was born in Rotherhithe, south London. He was a Justice of the Peace and later an acting Magistrate.

He wrote a number of Christian books, and was twice briefly editor of The Gospel Magazine, immediately before and immediately after Augustus Montague Toplady. He also wrote several hymns, including "The Christian Surrender".

He was originally a follower of John Wesley, but abandoned Wesleyan Arminianism in favour of the Calvinist teachings of George Whitefield. He defined himself as a "Church of England Methodist". As a theological writer, he focussed on doctrinal issues, including justification by faith, predestination and the afterlife.

He married Miss Cox when he was 21 and they had a son, Reverend Henry Cox Mason. William Mason died of a stroke at the age of 72.

== Bibliography ==
- A Spiritual Treasury for the Children of God
- The Believer's Pocket Companion
- The Christian Communicant
- Christian's Companion for the Sabbath, selected for the Family or Closet.
- Christian Communicant; or, Companion to the Lord's Supper.
- Free Grace Truths; or, Gospel Comfort for Doubting Minds.
- Crumbs from the Master's Table; or, Select Sentences of Divinity.
- Axe laid to the Root.
- Methodism Displayed, and Enthusiasm Detected.
- The Signs of the Times, addressed to Christians in general.
- Antinomian Heresy exploded.
- Gospel Duty to Gospel Ministers.
- Dialogue between a Churchman and one who is called a Methodist (in two parts)
- A commentary on Bunyan's The Pilgrim's Progress, printed as footnotes in some copies of the same as "Mason's Notes".
