= Jean Perronet =

Jean Perronet may refer to:

- Jean-Rodolphe Perronet (1708-1794), French engineer
- Jean Maurice Perronet (1877–1950), French fencer
