= Thomas Houghton =

Thomas Houghton may refer to:

- Thomas Houghton (architect) (1840–1903), American architect
- Thomas Houghton (priest) (1859–1951), Irish-born Anglican clergyman and editor of the Gospel magazine
- Thomas Houghton (politician) (1861–1933), Australian politician
- Thomas Houghton (rugby league), English rugby league player for New Zealand in 1909
