= Daniel Turner (hymn writer) =

English teacher, Baptist minister and hymn-writer

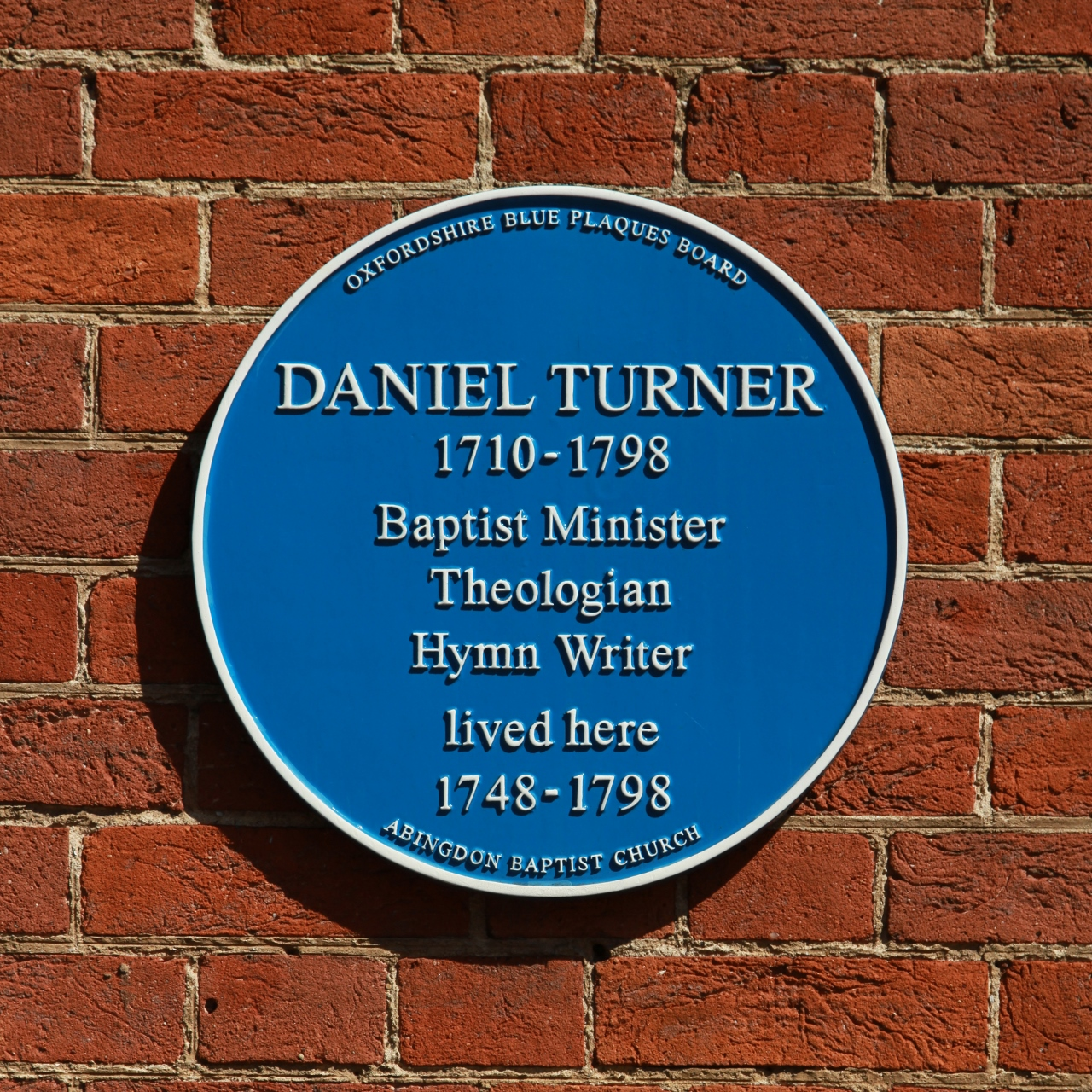
Daniel Turner's blue plaque in Abingdon

Daniel Turner (1710–1798) was an English teacher and Baptist minister, now known as a hymn-writer.

== Life ==
Turner was born at Blackwater Farm, near St. Albans, on 1 March 1710. He kept a boarding-school at Hemel Hempstead. His pupils there included William Kenrick and Hugh Smith. At the same time he made a reputation as an occasional preacher in Baptist chapels. In 1741 he was chosen pastor of the Baptist church in Reading, Berkshire. He moved in 1748 to Abingdon, and held the pastorate there until his death on 5 September 1798. He was buried in the Baptist cemetery at Abingdon.

Turner received the honorary degree of M.A. from the Baptist College, Providence, Rhode Island, U.S.A. He was a friend and correspondent of Robert Robinson, John Rippon, Isaac Watts, and others.

== Works ==
One of Turner's best known hymns is "Jesus, full of all compassion", which appeared in the Bristol Baptist Collection, 1769. Another, "Beyond the glittering starry skies", was published by his brother-in-law James Fanch, Baptist minister of Romsey, in The Gospel Magazine, June 1776. Turner expanded it by twenty-one stanzas, and included it in his Poems (1794). Besides pamphlets and sermons, he published:

- An Introduction to Psalmody, 1737.
- An Abstract of English Grammar and Rhetoric, London, 1739.
- Divine Songs, Hymns, and other Poems, Reading, 1747.
- A Compendium of Social Religion, 1758; 2nd edit. Bristol, 1778.
- Letters Religious and Moral, London, 1766; 2nd edit., Henley, 1793.
- Short Meditations on Select Portions of Scripture, Abingdon, 1771; 3rd edit. 1803.
- Devotional Poetry vindicated against Dr. Johnson, Oxford, 1785.
- Essays on Important Subjects, Oxford, 1787.
- Poems Devotional and Moral, privately printed, 1794.
- Common Sense, or the Plain Man's Answer to the Question, Whether Christianity be a Religion worthy of our choice?, 1797.

== Family ==
Turner was twice married: first, to Anne Fanch, by whom he had two sons, who both predeceased him; secondly, to Mrs. Lucas, a widow, of Reading, by whom he had no issue.

== Notes ==
Attribution

This article incorporates text from a publication now in the public domain: Lee, Sidney, ed. (1899). "Turner, Daniel (1710-1798)". Dictionary of National Biography. Vol. 57. London: Smith, Elder & Co.
