= Nicolas de Joinville =

Nicolas de Joinville was a French knight who served as bailli of the Principality of Achaea for Prince John of Gravina from 1323, until the Prince's arrival in Achaea in January 1325. He was the great-grandson of the chronicler Jean de Joinville. Joinville was an able man, and was sent to Achaea as part of John of Gravina's preparations for an—ultimately unsuccessful—campaign against the Byzantine Empire.

== Sources ==
- Bon, Antoine (1969). La Morée franque. Recherches historiques, topographiques et archéologiques sur la principauté d'Achaïe [The Frankish Morea. Historical, Topographic and Archaeological Studies on the Principality of Achaea] (in French). Paris: De Boccard. OCLC 869621129.
- Topping, Peter (1975). "The Morea, 1311–1364". In Setton, Kenneth M.; Hazard, Harry W. (eds.). A History of the Crusades, Volume III: The Fourteenth and Fifteenth Centuries. Vol. 3. Madison and London: University of Wisconsin Press. pp. 104–140. ISBN 0-299-06670-3.

Preceded by Perronet de Villamastray	Angevin bailli in the Principality of Achaea; 1323–1325	Vacant Direct administration by Prince John of Gravina Title next held by Pierre de Sus
