= St Mary le Port Church, Bristol =

Church in Bristol, England

St Mary le Port Church
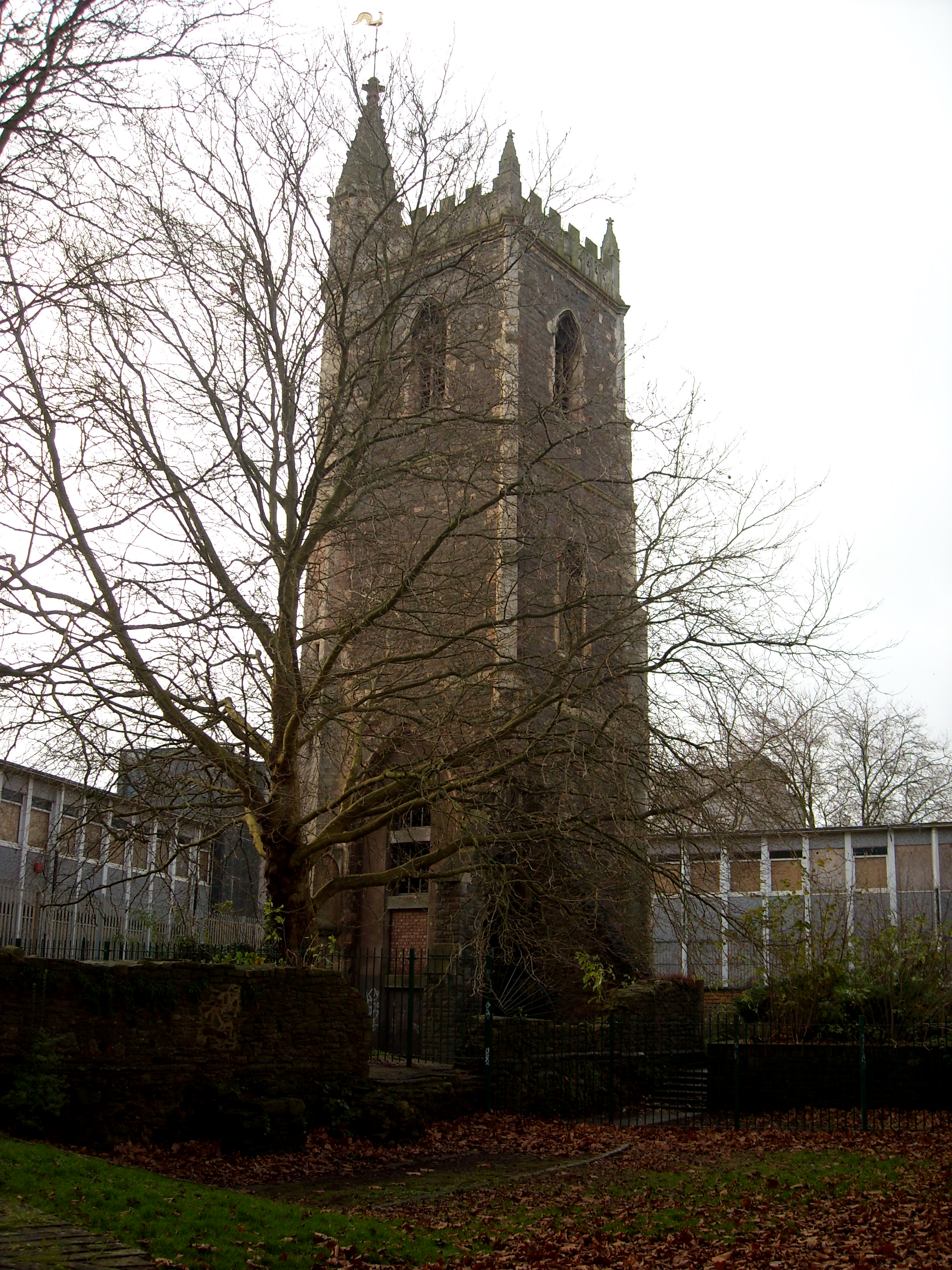
- The remains of the church tower in December 2014

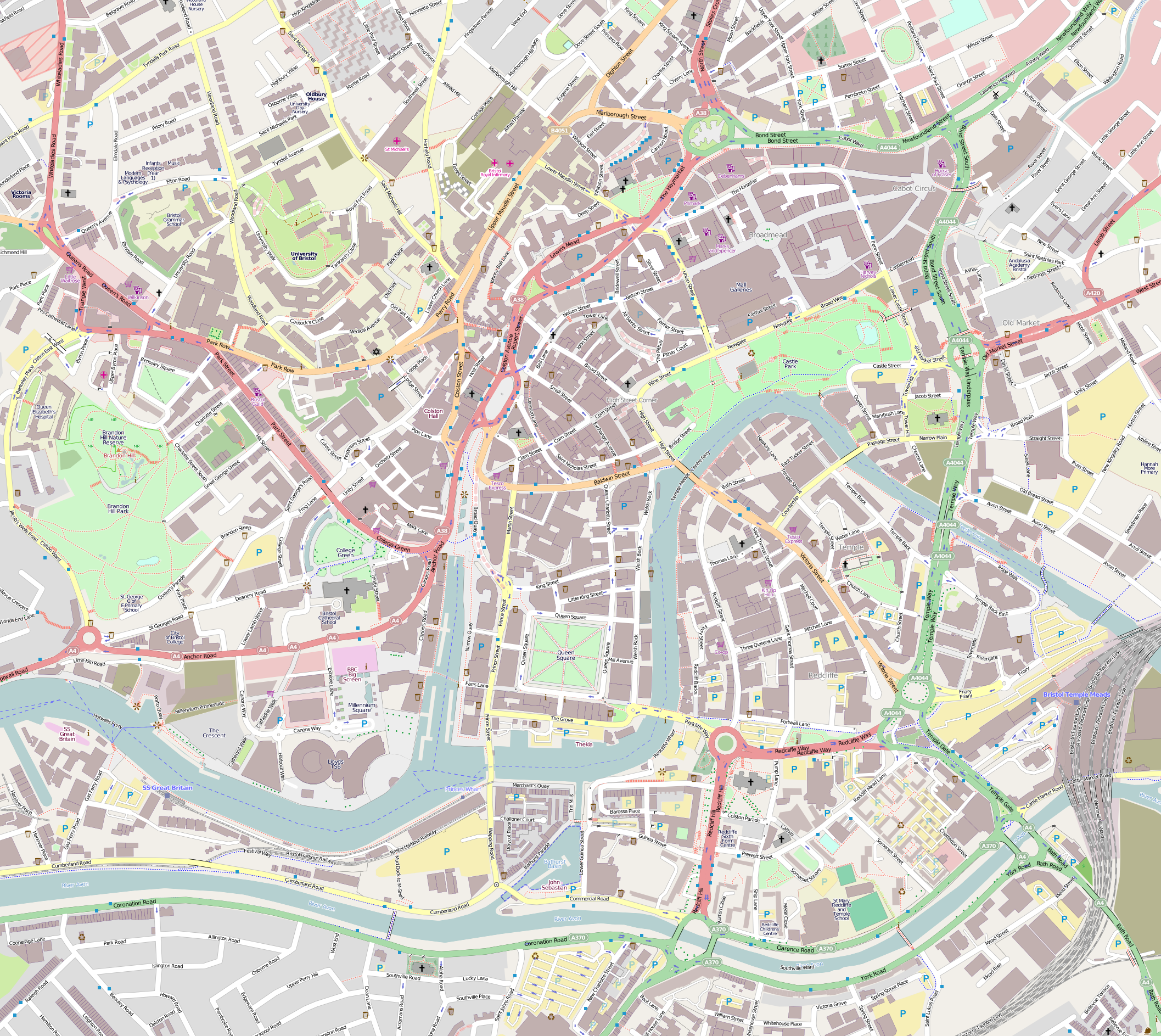
- Location within Bristol Central

General information
- Location: Bristol, England
- Coordinates: 51.4547°N 2.5916°W
- Completed: 15th century
- Demolished: (partially) 24 November 1940

St Mary le Port is a ruined parish church in the centre of Bristol, England, situated in Castle Park on what remains of Mary le Port Street.

== History ==
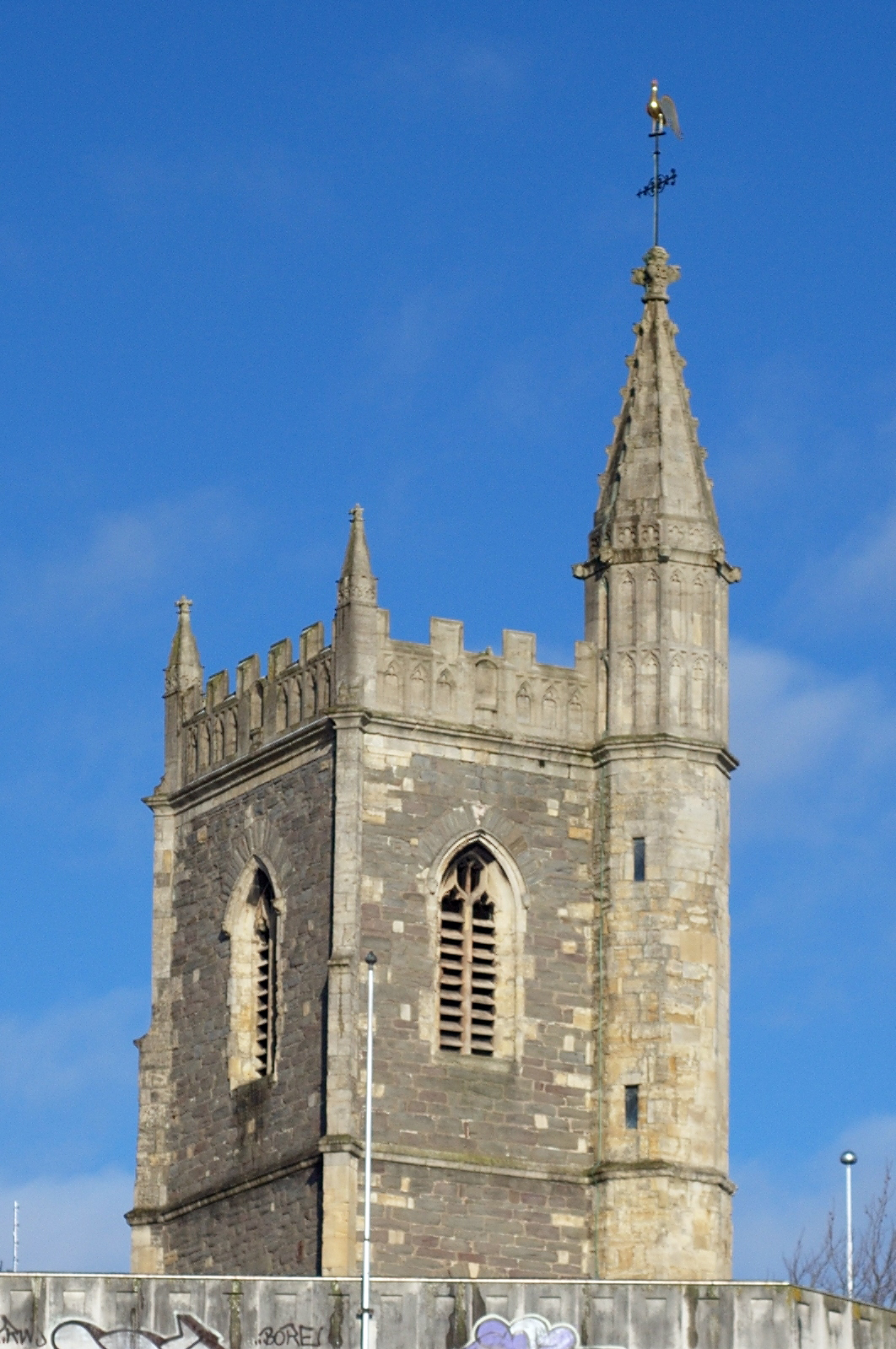
The top of the church tower seen from behind the derelict financial buildings

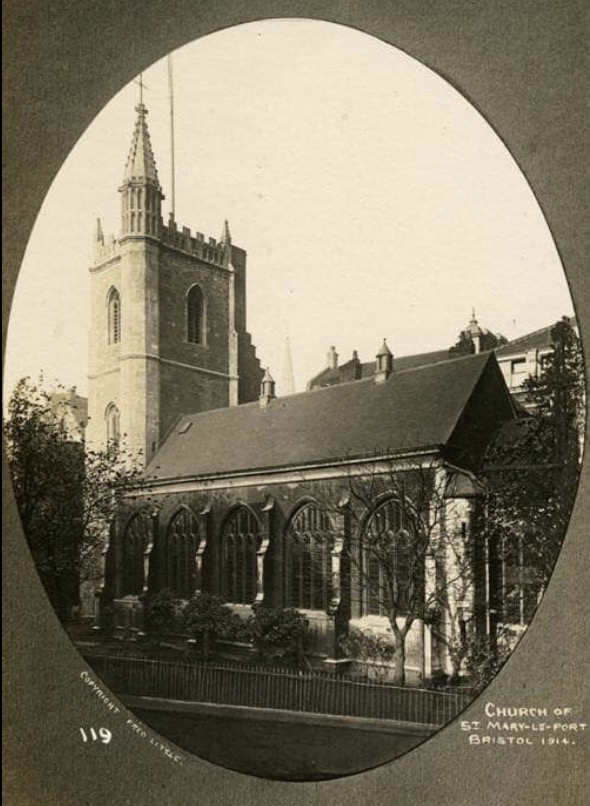
The church of St Mary le Port in circa 1900

St Mary le Port is said to have been founded in Saxon times after Anglo-Saxon foundations were found during archaeological excavations and Saxon pottery was found nearby. The church was rebuilt and enlarged between the 11th and 16th centuries.

During the 19th and early 20th centuries the church was a very popular centre of evangelical, Protestant, and Calvinist teaching within Anglicanism.

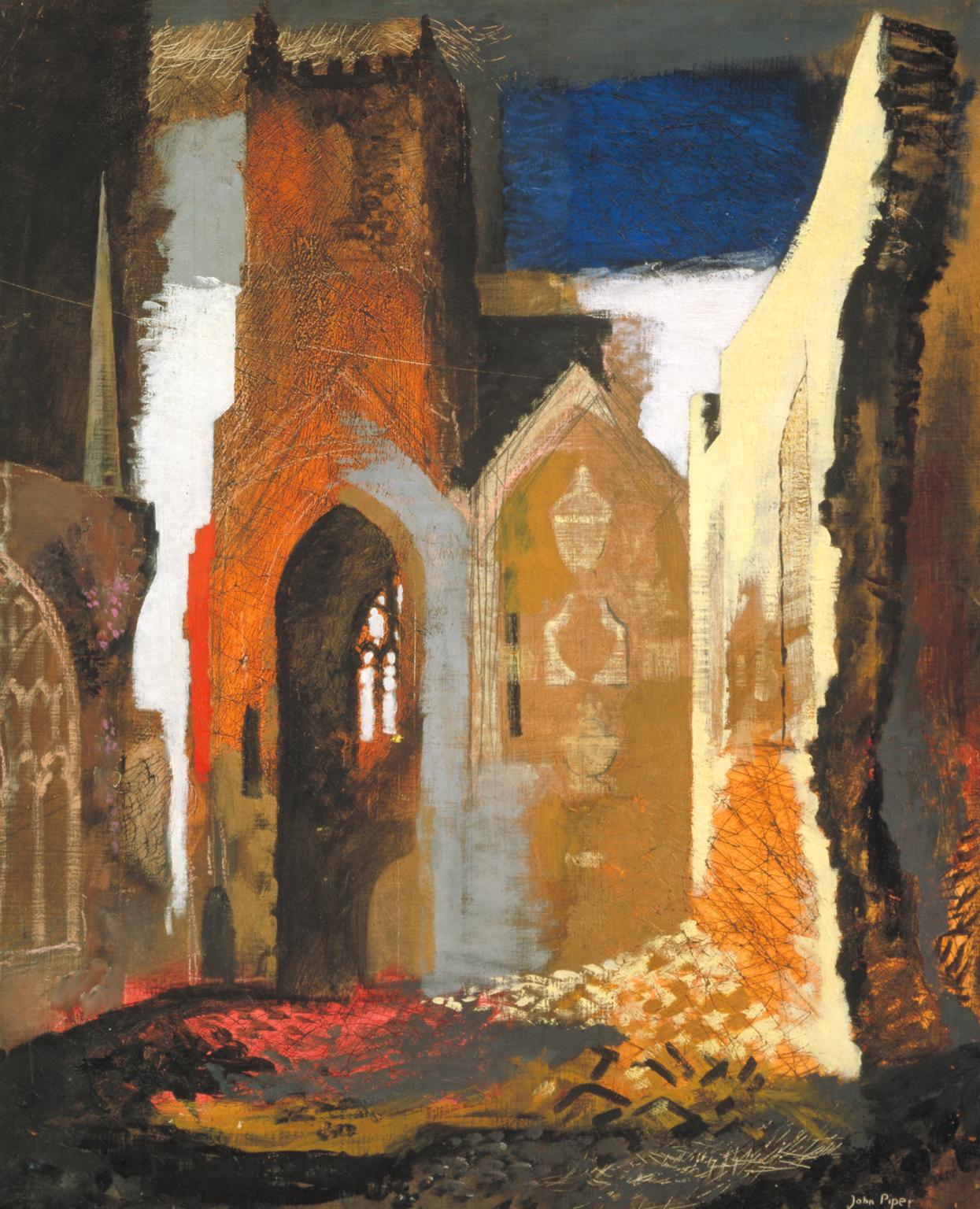
St Mary le Port, Bristol by John Piper (1940) (Tate N05718)

The church was bombed in the Second World War on 24 November 1940 during the Bristol Blitz. John Piper painted an evocative picture of the bombed St Mary le Port. This image appears on the 1/6d British commemorative stamp, part of a set of four paintings by British artists issued in 1968. All that remains of the church is the 15th-century tower, a Grade II listed building, and a scheduled monument surrounded during the latter years of the 20th century by the modernist buildings of Norwich Union and the Bank of England, which by the 2020s were both empty and had become semi-derelict, with further redevelopment proposed.

After the bombing in 1940 the congregation and their rector, William Dodgson-Sykes, moved to St John on the Wall Church, where the congregation remained, in gradually declining numbers, till this church building was closed for worship by the Church Commissioners in 1984 (after a protracted struggle by the congregation). The remaining congregation then moved to the Chapel of Foster's Almshouses, and joined the Church of England (Continuing) in 1995. The C of E (Continuing) no longer lists a congregation in Bristol; some of the congregation joined with the new Free Presbyterian Church (Ulster) congregation in Horfield, Bristol.

== Archives ==
Although many of the parish records of St Mary le Port church were destroyed when the church was bombed, some archive material is held at Bristol Archives (Refs. P. StMP) (online catalogue) and P.St JB/MLP (online catalogue) including copies of baptism, marriage and burial registers. The archive also includes records of the incumbent, churchwardens, parochial church council, charities and schools, plus deeds.

== Clergy of St Mary-le-Port church ==
The church's clergy have included:

- William Waite, rector, born 1764, died 1842, dates at St Mary le Port unknown
- William Tandey, curate 1784–1799 (lived 1750–1832)
- James Marshall, rector 1842 – (born 23 February 1796, died 29 August 1855)
- Mr Thomas, rector, resigned 1857
- Samuel Abraham Walker, rector 1857–1879 (born Dublin, 1809, died 30 November 1879) (source, The Gospel Magazine, January, 1880)
- James Ormiston, rector 1880 (and as at the 1901 census) (previously at Old Hill, West Midlands; editor of The Gospel Magazine from 1895 to 1916)
- William Dodgson Sykes, rector (as at 1940) (editor of The Gospel Magazine from 1964 to 1975)

– son of William Sykes (first President of the Sovereign Grace Union)
– Principal of the Bible Churchmen's Missionary and Theological College, later part of Trinity College, Bristol
(Bible Churchmen's Missionary Society, now Crosslinks
– Head of the Irish Church Missions

== See also ==
- Grade II listed buildings in Bristol
- Churches in Bristol
