= Thomas Houghton (priest) =

Irish-born English priest (1859–1951)

Thomas Houghton was an Irish born Anglican clergyman and long-time editor of the Gospel Magazine. He was born in Cork in 1859, and died in Bristol on 26 January 1951.

After studying for the ministry in Manchester he was ordained in 1885. He ministered in the following places:

- Emmanuel, Bolton
- Barrow-in-Furness
- Chadderton
- Stafford
- Derby
- Kensington Chapel, Bath (1898-1917), first pastored by Octavius Winslow
- Christ Church, Whittington (c1917-1949)

His wife, who had borne him four sons and four daughters, died in 1934. Of his children, three sons and two daughters served as missionaries abroad. These included Frank Houghton (1894-1972), bishop of East Sichuan and General Director of the China Inland Mission, and Alfred Thomas Houghton (1896-1993), Secretary of the Bible Churchmen's Missionary Society.

He edited The Gospel Magazine, one of the oldest evangelical periodicals still in production, from 1916 to 1951. He was also involved in The Sovereign Grace Advent Testimony and the Hebrew Christian Testimony to Israel, later incorporated in the Messianic Testimony.

== Bibliography ==
- Houghton, Thomas: The Faith and the Hope of the Future; London, The Sovereign Grace Advent Testimony, circa 1950. Includes A Biographical Appreciation by George H Fromow.
