= Ligorio Guindazzo =

14th-century Italian noble

Ligorio Guindazzo served as bailli of the Principality of Achaea for Prince John of Gravina from June 1321 to October 1322. He arrived with military reinforcements, two hundred foot soldiers and some cavalry, but nothing else is known of his tenure.

== Sources ==
- Bon, Antoine (1969). La Morée franque. Recherches historiques, topographiques et archéologiques sur la principauté d'Achaïe [The Frankish Morea. Historical, Topographic and Archaeological Studies on the Principality of Achaea] (in French). Paris: De Boccard. OCLC 869621129.

| Preceded by Frederick Trogisio | Angevin bailli in the Principality of Achaea; 1321–1322 | Succeeded by Perronet de Villamastray |
