= Battle of Saint George =

Part of the Byzantine–Frankish conflicts of the Frankokratia

- Part of the Byzantine–Frankish conflicts of the Frankokratia
- Map of the Peloponnese (Morea) in the Middle Ages.
Date	9 September 1320
Location	Castle of Saint George in Skorta, Arcadia, Greece 37°26′26″N 22°01′07″E or 37°23′22″N 22°01′39″E
Result	Byzantine victory
Territorial changes	Arcadia firmly under Byzantine control

Belligerents
Byzantine Empire	Principality of Achaea

Commanders and leaders
Andronikos Asen	Frederick Trogisio; Bartholomew II Ghisi (POW); James of Cyprus, Bishop of Olena (surrendered); Commander of the Teutonic Knights †; Commander of the Knights of St. John

Strength
Unknown	Unknown

The Battle of Saint George took place on 9 September 1320 between the Latin Principality of Achaea and the forces of the Byzantine governor of Mystras, at the fortress of Saint George in Skorta in Arcadia. As a result of the battle, Arcadia, the heartland of the Morea, came firmly under Byzantine control.

== Background ==
From c. 1315 on, the Latin Principality of Achaea, which controlled most of the Morea (Peloponnese) peninsula in southern Greece, entered a period of instability, as the princely title was disputed by multiple claimants. A Catalan invasion in 1315 in support of the claims of Isabella of Sabran was defeated at the Battle of Manolada in 1316, but Prince Louis of Burgundy died soon after, leaving his title contested between his wife, Matilda of Hainaut, the Angevins of Naples, who as the Principality's liege lords forced her to marry the Angevin John of Gravina, and Louis' brother Odo IV, Duke of Burgundy. An Angevin baillie, Frederick Trogisio, was sent to govern the Principality in 1318, but it was not until 1322 that the matter was settled, with Odo's claims bought by the Angevins and Matilda effectively confined in Naples. In contrast to the turmoils of the Principality of Achaea, the Byzantine province of Mystras, encompassing the southeastern Morea, during the same period (1316–c. 1323) came under the steady and effective governance of Andronikos Asen, a nephew of the Byzantine emperor Andronikos II Palaiologos. A capable leader, Asen pursued the perennial war against the Latins of Achaea with considerable vigour.

== Asen's 1320 campaign and the battle at Saint George castle ==
According to the French and Aragonese versions of the Chronicle of the Morea, in 1320 Asen launched a campaign into Arcadia, the central region of the Morea, and laid siege to the castle of Saint George in Skorta. The castle had been built by the Latins in the early 1290s, and was part of a chain of fortresses guarding the passes of the mountains of Skorta. It had already been lost to the Byzantines by treachery in c. 1294, and recovered by the Latins at some unknown date after.

In response, the baillie Trogisio assembled an army to relieve the castle, calling on the vassals of the principality for assistance: among them were the Bishop of Olena, James of Cyprus, the Grand Constable Bartholomew II Ghisi, and the commanders of the Knights of St. John and of the Teutonic Knights in Achaea.

Learning of the Latins' approach, Asen intensified the siege, and on 9 September, its Greek castellan, Nicoloucho of Patras, surrendered. Taking possession, Asen left the banners of Achaea flying, so as to mislead the relief force. The ruse succeeded, and as the Achaean army approached the castle in the belief that it was still held by their allies and that the Byzantines had abandoned the siege, Asen sprang his trap. The Byzantines were victorious in the battle, and killed many of the Latins, including the commander of the Teutonic Knights. Many others were taken prisoner, including Bartholomew Ghisi and the Bishop of Olena. The latter was immediately set free, while Ghisi and the rest were taken to Constantinople.

In the same campaign – the Aragonese and French versions disagree on whether this happened before or after the siege of Saint George – the Byzantines went on to secure, by bribing their commandants, the castles of Karytaina, Akova, and Polyphengos.

== Aftermath ==
Asen's 1320 campaign secured the Arcadian plateau for the Byzantines, and reduced the Principality of Achaea to the western and northern coasts of the Morea, encompassing the modern regional units of Messenia, Elis, Achaea, Corinthia, and Argolis. The fortresses that for fifty years had formed a defensive bulwark against the Byzantine endeavours to expand their province were now lost. At this time, many of the Latin settlers in Arcadia, many of whom may have had Greek mothers, abandoned the Catholic Church and went over to Greek Orthodoxy.

The Byzantine successes, and the manifest inability of their Angevin suzerains to protect them, led the leading barons of the principality to send the Franciscan prior Peter Gradenigo to the Doge of Venice in June 1321, offering the principality, as well as the suzerainty over the Lordship of Negroponte, to the Republic of Venice. Nothing came of these proposals, but a new Angevin baillie, Ligorio Guindazzo, arrived some time in 1321. His tenure was brief—about a year—and unremarkable. During the same time, John of Gravina began preparing an expedition to the Morea, but it was not until January 1325 that the Prince of Achaea left Italy for his principality, with 25 galleys, 400 cavalry, and 1,000 infantry. He occupied Cephalonia and restored Angevin control over Achaea, as the barons and vassal lords of Latin Greece came to pay him homage, but his attempt to recapture Karytaina failed due to the energetic resistance of its garrison, the raids launched by the Byzantine governor into Latin territories, and the approach of winter. In spring 1326, John of Gravina again departed the Morea, leaving its governance once again to short-lived baillies. The Duke of Naxos, Nicholas I Sanudo, whom John of Gravina left in charge of military operations, managed to defeat a larger Byzantine army raiding the principality in a hard-fought battle soon thereafter, but this was not enough to check Byzantine power in the Morea in the long term.

== Sources ==
- Bon, Antoine (1969). La Morée franque. Recherches historiques, topographiques et archéologiques sur la principauté d'Achaïe [The Frankish Morea. Historical, Topographic and Archaeological Studies on the Principality of Achaea] (in French). Paris: De Boccard.
- Topping, Peter (1975). "The Morea, 1311–1364". In Setton, Kenneth M.; Hazard, Harry W. (eds.). A History of the Crusades, Volume III: The Fourteenth and Fifteenth Centuries. Vol. 3. Madison and London: University of Wisconsin Press. pp. 104–140. ISBN 0-299-06670-3.
