= John Kitchen (musician) =

Scottish organist and early music scholar (born 1950)

John Kitchen MBE
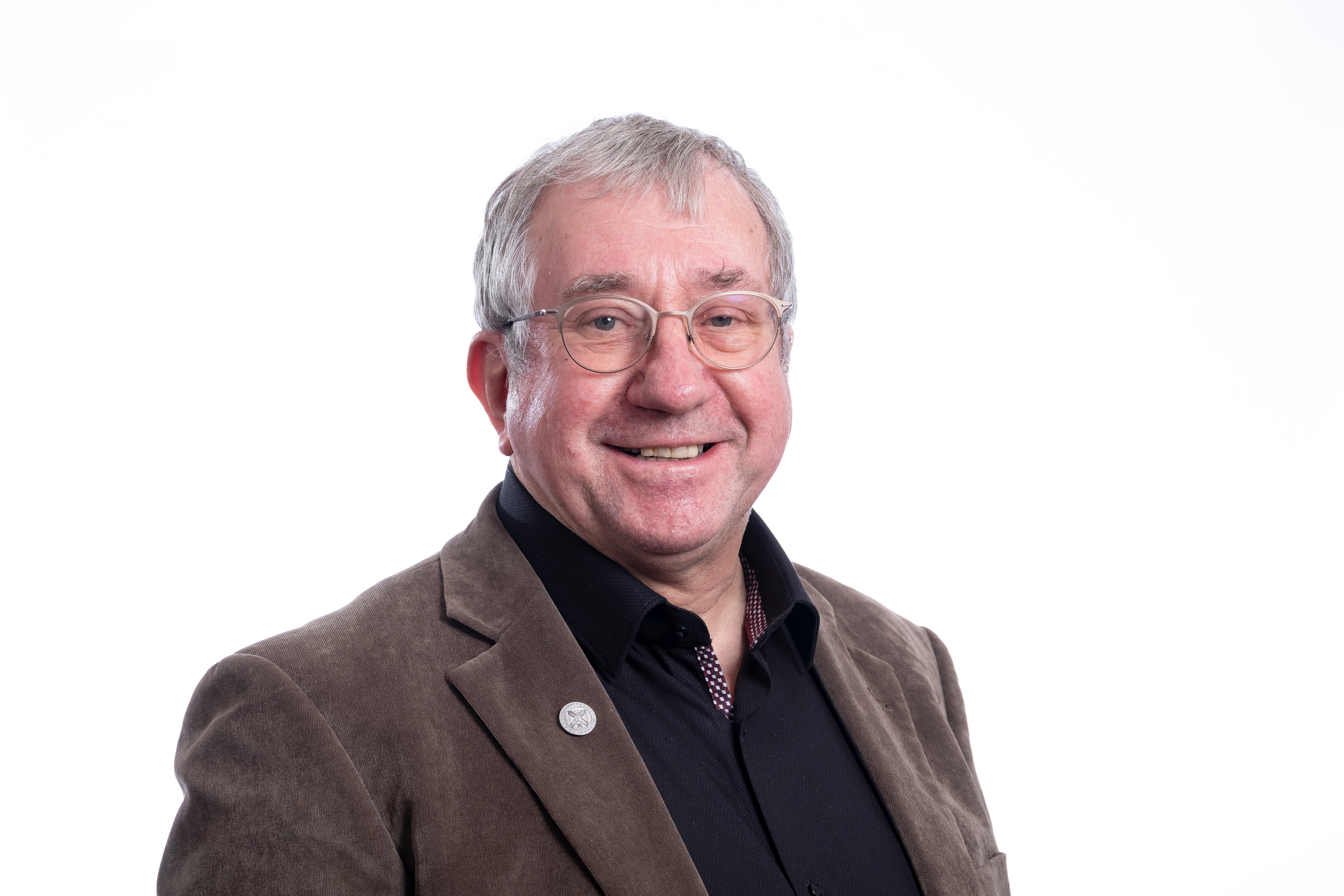
- John Kitchen at St Mary's Music School Edinburgh
- Born: 27 October 1950 (age 75); United Kingdom
- Education: Glasgow University, University of Cambridge
- Occupations: Edinburgh City Organist, music scholar and educator

John Philip Kitchen MBE (born 27 October 1950) is a Scottish organist, harpsichordist, pianist, conductor, early music scholar, and music educator based in Edinburgh. He serves as the Edinburgh City Organist. Kitchen is known for his extensive recording portfolio of organ music, and his research and demonstration of historical keyboard instruments. He made major contributions to the discography and scholarship on the organ works of William Russell, and Johann Ludwig Krebs.

== Current positions ==
Kitchen is the Director of Music of Old Saint Paul's Episcopal Church. and teaches harpsichord at St Mary's Music School, Edinburgh. He is also the Edinburgh City Organist, with related duties at Usher Hall, and the University Organist at the University of Edinburgh. For 30 years conducted the Edinburgh University Singers, retiring in 2018. He is also involved with the preservation, expansion and demonstration to the public of the collection of early keyboard instruments at St Cecilia's Hall in Edinburgh. He was appointed MBE in the 2016 Queen's Birthday Honours list.

== Education and professional history ==
Kitchen had piano lessons from the age of 6, and started teaching himself the organ at around 8 when he was accompanying his local Sunday School. He was in his 20s before he had formal organ lessons. He earned the Master of Arts and Bachelor of Music degrees at Glasgow University, and earned a Doctor of Philosophy (PhD) degree from the University of Cambridge where he researched 17th-century French harpsichord music. His doctoral thesis (approved 1980) was titled "Harpsichord music of seventeenth century France: the forms, their origins and developments, with particular emphasis on the work of Louis Couperin (1626–1661)". While at Cambridge, he was organ scholar of Clare College, and studied the organ with Gillian Weir. From 1976 until 1988, he was a lecturer in Music and University Organist at the University of St Andrews. From 1988 to 2014, he was Senior Lecturer in Music at the University of Edinburgh, teaching harmony, counterpoint, keyboard skills, history, and performance practice at all levels. Kitchen has a Fellowship Diploma (FRCO) from the Royal College of Organists, and he is a Licentiate of the Royal Academy of Music (LRAM). He is a member of the Baroque ensemble Laudonia.

== Scholarship ==
Kitchen has studied and recorded the complete Organ Voluntaries of the organist William Russell (1777–1813) on the Delphian Label. The recording took place in 2008 on the restored 1829 J.C. Bishop organ at St. James, Bermondsey. As part of this project, Kitchen authored a detailed essay about Russell and his music, with information about every single Voluntary (including the disposition of the organ and the registration of the Voluntary)

Kitchen has studied and recorded the complete organ works of Baroque composer Johann Ludwig Krebs (1713–1780). These recordings (on the Priory Records label) were made in 2000–2001 on several different organs, including the two-manual Frobenius organ of Canongate Kirk, Edinburgh.

Kitchen has published multiple reviews of recordings, studies and organ manuals in the journals Early Music, Early Music Today, Choir & Organ, Organists' Review, and The Organ Yearbook,

Kitchen recorded recitals that introduce and explore different organs, including the organ at Usher Hall (Edinburgh); the organ at McEwan Hall (University of Edinburgh); the Reid Concert Hall (University of Edinburgh); the 1769 Pascal Taskin harpsichord; and instruments from the Rodger Mirrey and Raymond Russell collections.

== Selected discography ==
- Gaudeamus Igitur: John Kitchen plays the Organ of McEwan Hall; Delphian DCD 34163; ASIN: B01F3P5MB8; 2016.
- The Usher Hall Organ Volume II; Delphian DCD 34132; ASIN: B00OYT32KI, 2015.
- Russell: Complete Organ Voluntaries; Delphian DCD 34062; ASIN: B001O4FDC6; 2013.
- Music from the Age of Louis XIV; Delphian DCD 34109; ASIN: B00DP5K0QQ; 2012.
- John Kitchen Plays Handel Overtures; Delphian DCD34053; ASIN: B002B847I0, 2011.
- Krebs Complete Organ Works / John Kitchen; Priory Records PRCDBOX400 / PRCD734-739; 2010.
- Instruments from the Rodger Mirrey Collection; Delphian DCD 34057; ASIN: B00OYT32KI; 2010.
- Organs of Edinburgh; Delphian DCD 34100; ASIN: B01K8LNLUQ; 2010.
- Music from the age of Louis XV: John Kitchen plays the 1769 Taskin Harpsichord; Delphian DCD 34112; 2012.
- La Paix Du Parnasse; Delphian DCD 34012; ASIN: B0001FV4ZO, 2006.
- Instruments of the Russell Collection, Volume 2; Delphian DCD 34309; ASIN: B000EJ9LSY; 2006.
- Instruments of the Russell Collection, Volume 1; Delphian DCD 34001; ASIN: B00005LVXO; 2006.
- The Usher Hall Organ; Delphian DCD 34022; ASIN: B0001W8E2S; 2004.
- Great European Organs No. 49 – John Kitchen plays the Organ of the Reid Concert Hall, University of Edinburgh; Priory Records; ASIN: B00000F1RJ; 1998
- The Grand Tour: Laudonia with Susan Hamilton; Laudonia SCIO, SKU: 9006807000015
