= Leonidas Pyrgos =

Greek fencer

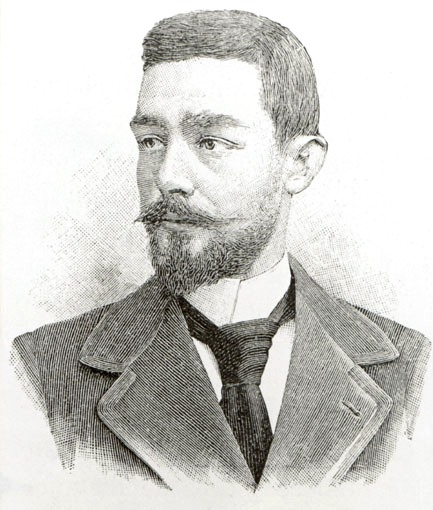

Medal record

Men's fencing

Representing Greece

Olympic Games
Gold medal – first place	1896 Athens	Masters foil

Leonidas "Leon" Pyrgos (Greek: Λεωνίδας "Λέων" Πύργος, born 1874 in Mantineia, Arcadia; date of death unknown) was a Greek fencer.

== Career ==
Pyrgos was the first Greek Olympic medallist in the history of the modern Olympic Games, winning his fencing event of the 1896 Summer Olympics on 7 April 1896. His competitor in the event, which consisted of a single bout of foil fencing to three touches, was one of the best fencers in the world, the Frenchman Joanni Perronet. After a close contest, Pyrgos won 3–1. The crowd cheered the first Greek Olympic medallist. He was lifted onto their shoulders and carried throughout the streets of Athens.
