= Thomas Hastings (composer) =

Thomas Hastings

Thomas Hastings (15 October 1784 – 15 May 1872) was an American composer, primarily an author of hymn tunes of which the best known is "Toplady" for the hymn Rock of Ages. He was born to Dr. Seth and Eunice (Parmele) Hastings in Washington, Connecticut. He was a 3rd great-grandson of Thomas Hastings who came from the East Anglia region of England to the Massachusetts Bay Colony in 1634.

== Life and career ==
Hastings moved to Clinton, New York, as a youth and began his career as a singing teacher, being largely a self-taught musician. Hastings compiled the hymn book Spiritual Songs with Lowell Mason in 1831, which included his most well-known hymn "Rock of Ages." He then moved to New York City, where he served as a choir master for 40 years, from 1832 to 1872. Hastings was a prolific composer, writing some 1000 hymn tunes over his career, and what Mason calls the "simple, easy, and solemn" style of his music remains a major influence on the hymns of the Protestant churches to this day.

Hastings' 1822 Dissertation on Musical Taste, the first full musical treatise by an American author, was a notable voice in the shift in American music toward the models of German music rather than British; as "one of the first spokespersons for the cultivated tradition of American music", he emphasized the science and philosophical mission of music above the looser and more folk-based music of his predecessors. While Hastings' first compilation still showed strong evidence of adherence to the British tradition, later works would include many German songs, and what older hymns and other settings he did include had the harmonies completely rewritten to conform to German ideals of classical music.

In addition to his composition and compiling of tunebooks for use in the singing schools, Hastings founded Musical Magazine, a periodical he edited from 1835 to 1837; his early writings on church music for the Western Recorder, which he began editing in 1823, had given him the prior experience, as well as establishing his musical and professional credibility around its home base of Utica, New York and the surrounding areas.

Hastings died in New York in 1872 and is buried in Green-Wood Cemetery.

== Media ==
Rock of Ages
organ solo
