= David Alfred Doudney =

English printer, journalist and author

David Alfred Doudney (1811–1893) was an English printer, journalist and author, who became an evangelical clergyman. He is known as a founder of schools.

== Life ==
The son of John Doudney (died 1834), he was born on 8 March 1811 at his father's house, 386 Mile End Terrace, Portsea. Aged 13, Doudney was apprenticed to a printer in Southampton, and he then joined the staff of the Hampshire Advertiser. In 1832 he moved to London, and was engaged by Messrs. Jowett & Mills, printers, of Bolt Court, Fleet Street, until 1835, when he set up a printing business of his own, first at Holloway, and then in Long Lane, City of London on a site later taken by the Metropolitan Railway station. In 1840 Doudney purchased and became editor of The Gospel Magazine, and in 1846 he retired from printing.

In November 1846 Doudney went to Ireland to distribute funds raised by readers of the Gospel Magazine for the relief of the Great Famine. In the following year he was ordained deacon and priest in the Anglican church by Richard Daly, the Bishop of Cashel and Waterford, and from 1847 to 1859 he was vicar of Kilrush and curate of Monksland, County Waterford. Finding a need, Doudney established industrial, infant, and agricultural schools at Bunmahon (Bonmahon), where technical instruction was supplied.

Doudney left Ireland in 1859 to become perpetual curate of St. Luke's, Bedminster, Bristol, where he established similar industrial schools. He continued to edit the Gospel Magazine. Doudney also took part in charitable institutions, particularly the Printers' Corporation. He retired from St. Luke's in 1890, and in that year was presented with £1000 in recognition of his fifty years' editorship of the Gospel Magazine. He moved to Southville, Granada Road, Southsea, where he died on 21 April 1893; He was buried in Southsea cemetery on the 20th.

== Works ==
A printing press was set up at Bonmahon. It issued Doudney's abridgment of John Gill's Exposition of the Old and New Testaments, in four volumes (between 1852 and 1854), and in two volumes, 1852–3, respectively. He also issued from the Bonmahon press a periodical entitled Old Jonathan, which he continued to edit until his death. Doudney published an account of his schools in A Pictorial Outline of the Rise and Progress of the Bonmahon Schools, 1855.

In 1866 Doudney edited the Recollections and Remains of the Rev. George David Doudney, his cousin and brother-in-law, an evangelical like himself. He also published tracts.

His devotional works include:

- Walks and Talks with Jesus
- Mornings with Jesus
- Evenings with Jesus
- Bible Lives and Bible Lessons or Gleanings From the Book of Genesis
- Yet, A Motto For All Times And Seasons: Being A Selection Of Texts In Which God's Promises And Faith's Plea Are Most Encouragingly Presented
- Sympathy; Or, Words for the Weak and the Weary

== Family ==
Doudney was twice married, and left four sons and two daughters. The writer Sarah Doudney was his niece.

== Notes ==
Attribution

This article incorporates text from a publication now in the public domain: Lee, Sidney, ed. (1901). "Doudney, David Alfred". Dictionary of National Biography (1st supplement). Vol. 2. London: Smith, Elder & Co.
