= William Shrubsole =

English musician and composer

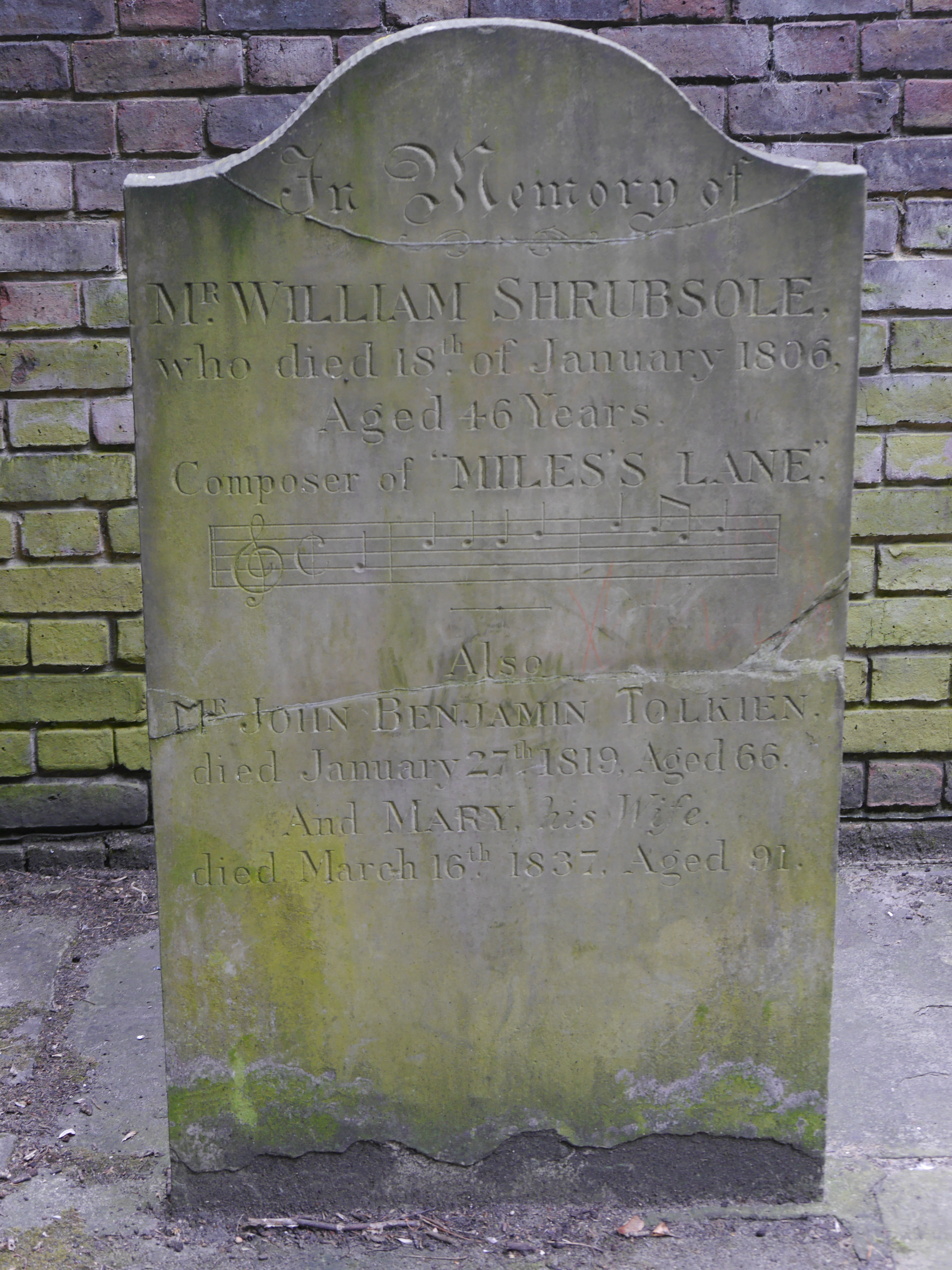
Headstone at Bunhill Fields for William Shrubsole, John Benjamin Tolkien (d. 1819) and Mary Tolkien (d. 1837)

William Shrubsole (1760–1806) was an English musician and composer.

== Life ==
The youngest son of Thomas Shrubsole, a farrier, he was born at Canterbury, and baptised on 13 January 1760. He was a chorister in Canterbury Cathedral from 1770 to 1777, and organist at Bangor Cathedral from 1782 to 1784, when he was dismissed for attending nonconformist meetings.

Shrubsole became organist of Spa Fields Chapel, London, and held the post till his death on 18 January 1806. He was a successful teacher in London, and among his pupils were William Russell and Benjamin Jacob. The 1794 Musical Directory describes him as an alto singer, and in that capacity he is said to have sung at Drury Lane and Westminster Abbey.

Shrubsole is buried at Bunhill Fields, London. Buried with him are the great-great-grandparents of J.R.R. Tolkien, John Benjamin and Mary Tolkien.

== Works ==
Shrubsole composed the hymn-tune known as "Miles Lane". It was set to the hymn by Edward Perronet, All hail! the power of Jesus' Name. He knew Perronet at Canterbury, and Perronet left him property. The first notes of "Miles Lane" were cut on Shrubsole's tombstone.

Ralph Vaughan Williams wrote an article in the Manchester Guardian entitled 'Shrubsole' in which he describes him as a "one tune man", saying that he wrote "this one superb tune and no more".

== Notes ==
Attribution

This article incorporates text from a publication now in the public domain: Lee, Sidney, ed. (1897). "Shrubsole, William (1760-1806)". Dictionary of National Biography. Vol. 52. London: Smith, Elder & Co.
