= Wadsley Bridge =

Coordinates: 53.4187°N 1.4987°W

- Location within South Yorkshire
- Metropolitan borough: Sheffield
- Metropolitan county: South Yorkshire
- Region: Yorkshire and the Humber
- Country: England
- Sovereign state: United Kingdom
- Post town: SHEFFIELD
- Postcode district: S6
- Dialling code: 0114
- Police: South Yorkshire
- Fire: South Yorkshire
- Ambulance: Yorkshire
- UK Parliament: Sheffield Brightside

Wadsley Bridge is a suburb of Sheffield, South Yorkshire, England, 3 miles (4.8 km) northwest of the city centre. The area is a mixture of residential housing and small industrial and commercial premises. The suburb falls within the Hillsborough ward of the City.

== Etymology ==
Wadsley Bridge was named after the bridge at SK334905 called High Bridge near the eastern end of the Sheffield Wednesday ground in what is now called Owlerton. The bridge carried the track between the villages of Ecclesfield and Wadsley over the River Don in the early 17th century, and the immediate area around the bridge became known as Wadsley Bridge. The original description was “the hamlet near the bridge at Wadsley”. The centre of the suburb has now moved northerly being centred on the railway bridge over the A61 road at SK334914 and many people think that the district is named after this bridge.

== History ==
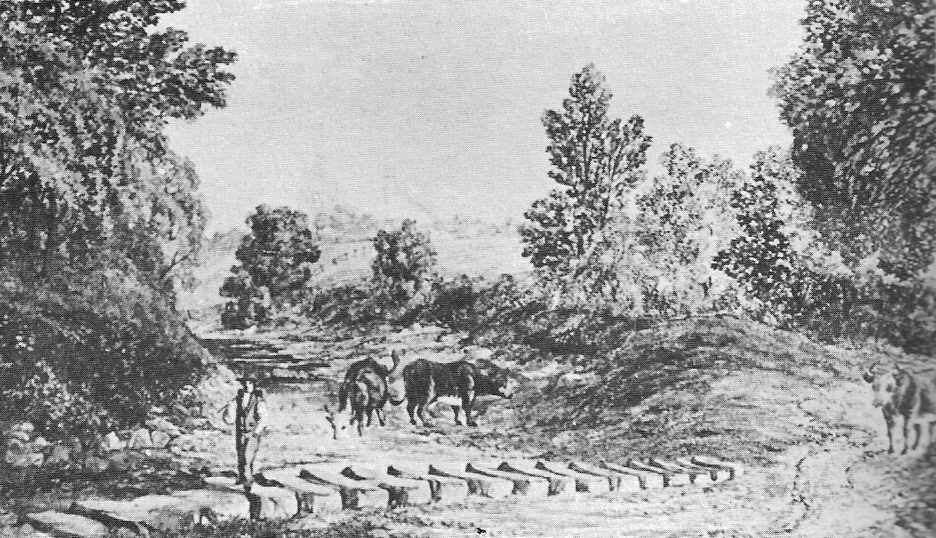
The Lepping Stones at Wadsley Bridge in 1779.

Wadsley Bridge started to expand during the 18th century when water power was harnessed and various mills were built on the River Don on Clay Wheels Lane and at the foot of Leppings Lane. John Hoult had a paper mill which was later converted into a steel tilt and run by the Sanderson Bros firm. The suburb was changed by the opening of the Sheffield, Ashton-Under-Lyne and Manchester Railway in 1845; Wadsley Bridge railway station was opened to serve the community and the railway bridge was constructed over the rough trail which went north to Ecclesfield which was later to become the A61. The Sheffield Tramway was extended to Wadsley Bridge in June 1924 with the ground beneath the railway bridge having to be excavated so the tram could pass under. The bridge itself was a small stone arched structure which double decker buses later had trouble getting under, having to move into the middle of the road to avoid hitting the stonework. It was replaced in the early 1970s when the A61 became dual carriageway, by a higher and wider structure.

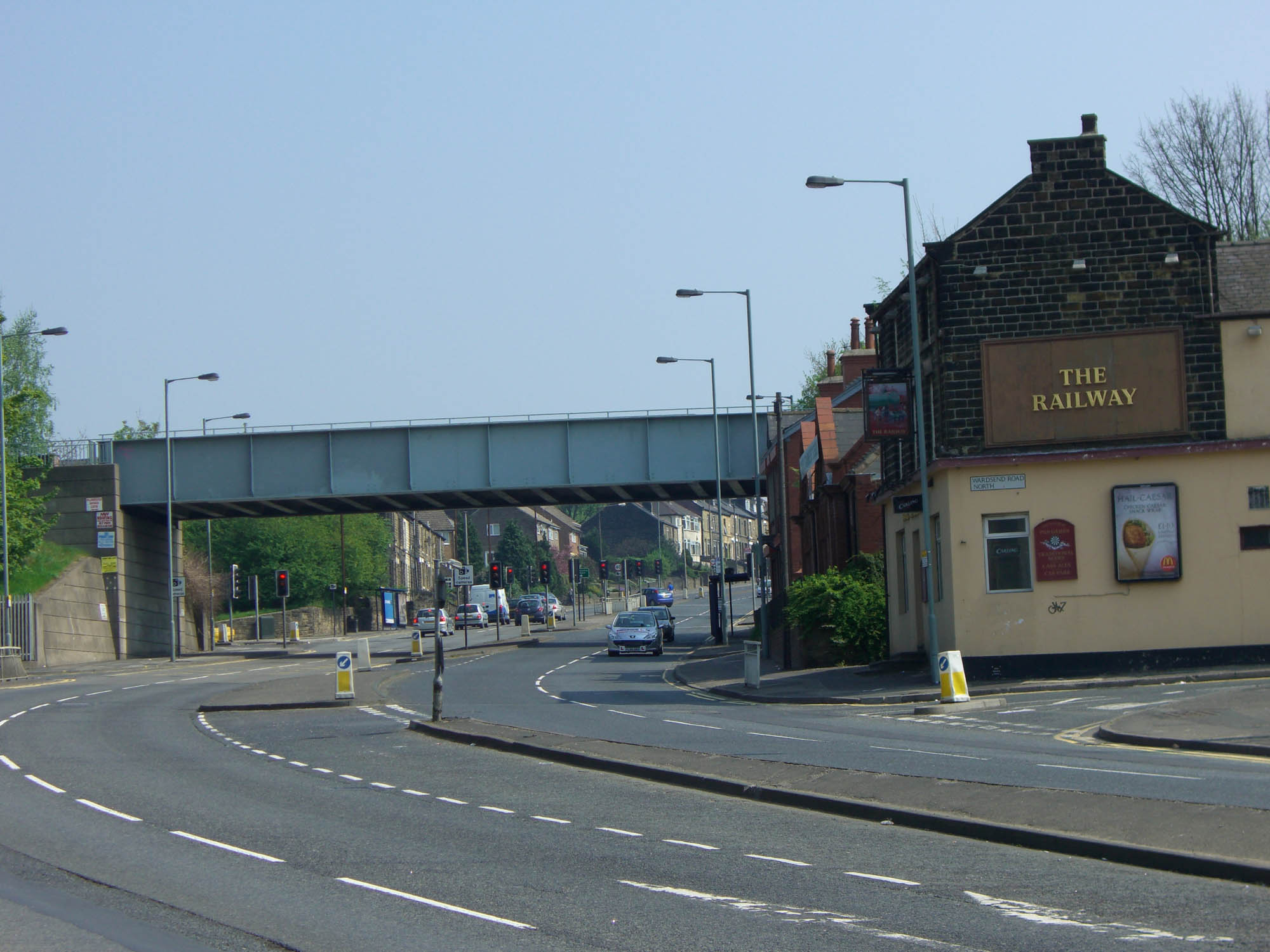
The railway bridge over the A61 with the railway pub on the right.

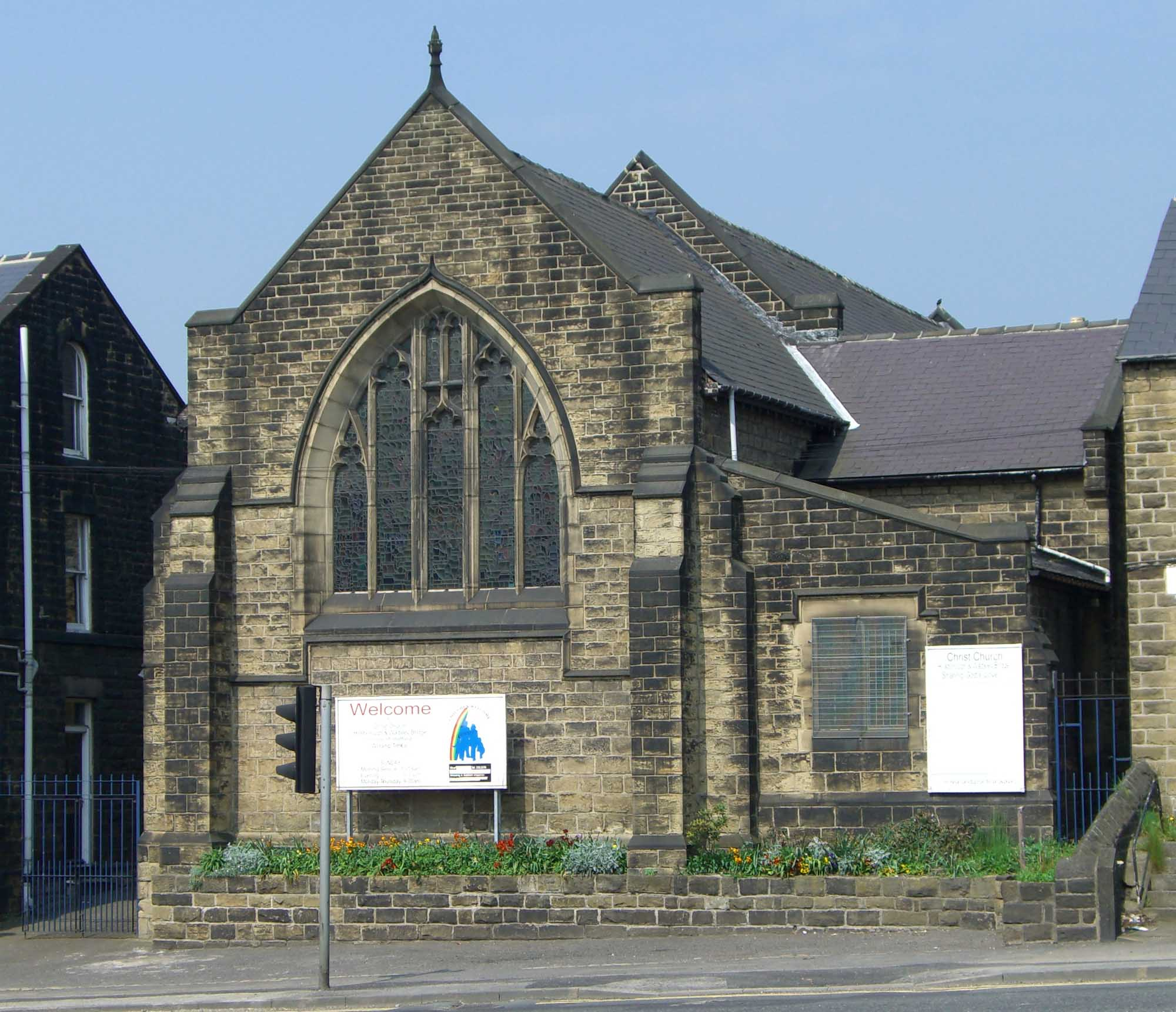
Christ Church, Wadsley Bridge, with the east window at the front of the building.

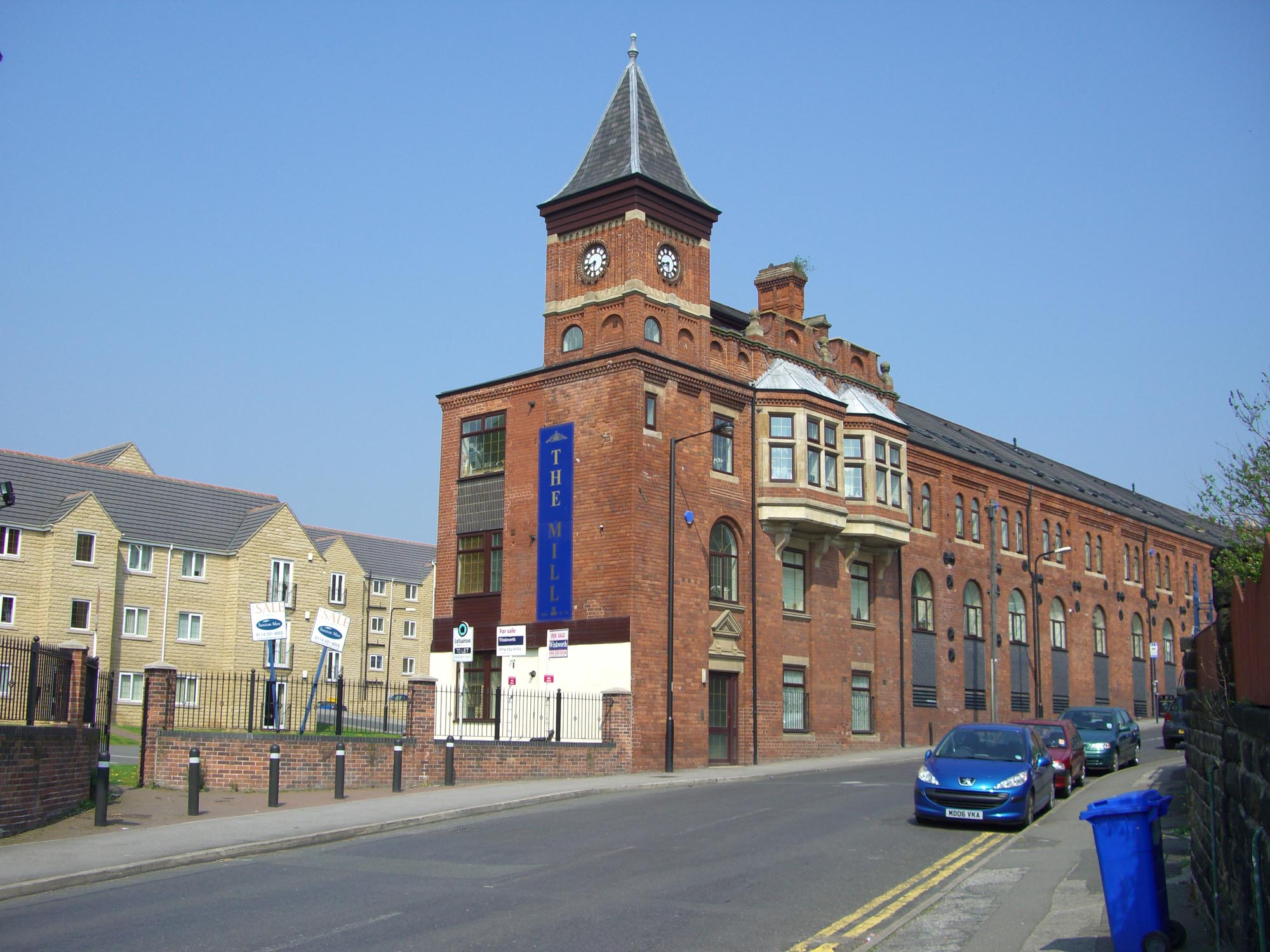
The old Moss & Gamble mill on Fox Hill Road has been converted into apartments.

Other industrial facilities in the area by the start of the 20th century included the Lepping Forge iron and steel works at the junction of Leppings Lane and Penistone Road, built by Joseph Clifton Allen (died 1924). This was demolished in the 1960s after the death of Joseph's son, Charles Edmund Allen (died December 1954), and the site is now a petrol station. Niagara Works on Clay Wheels Lane produced edge tools; the firm was named after the Niagara weir on the River Don. Moss and Gamble’s forge at the foot of Fox Hill Road had a ten-ton steam hammer, the biggest in Sheffield at the time. The Moss and Gamble site had two ponds to supply water to the works which in the 1960s were filled in and used for new housing; the factory itself has been converted into flats and called Baxter Mews.

ELG Carrs Stainless Steels is a large firm in the district formerly known as Richard W Carr & Co Ltd, it was formed in 1902 and produces special and stainless steels. Other prominent steel firms in the area are Hillfoot Steels and Hillsborough Steelstock Ltd. Fletchers Bakery on Clay Wheels Lane opened as a small bakehouse in 1923 and grew to a firm employing 650 people in 2006 when it suffered a catastrophic fire in July of that year. Wadsley Bridge school was built in 1906 being demolished in 1997 and is now the site of a large fitness business. One of the oldest companies in the area is the John Fairest funeral directors who have been in the district since 1880.

=== Christ Church, Wadsley Bridge ===
In 1895 the new church parish of Hillsborough and Wadsley Bridge was created for the district out of the Wadsley parish. The new parish’s first minister was the Reverend William Sykes and his intention was to build two churches, one for Hillsborough and one for Wadsley Bridge at each end of the parish. Christ Church was built on Halifax Road just above the Wadsley Bridge railway bridge at the site of a tin tabernacle which had stood since 1877 and was so dilapidated that pieces could be broken from it.

The new church cost £3,600, it is not outstanding architecturally being built in the Perpendicular Gothic style with no spire or tower. The highlight of the interior is the stained glass east window which depicts the Trinity and was designed by Harry Stammers of York. The church was consecrated by William Dalrymple Maclagan, Archbishop of York on 10 October 1902. The second church intended for the Hillsborough part of the parish was never built.

=== Niagara Recreation Ground ===
The Niagara ground is the present day venue of the South Yorkshire Police Sports and Social Club, opened by the Princess Royal on 23 August 1928. It was built on a former Victorian tip on land purchased from the Duke of Norfolk for £3,700. There are facilities for many sports and the pavilion is available for conferences, weddings, banquets and family occasions.

== Present day ==
Wadsley Bridge continues to develop; the Kilner Way retail park opened in the 1970s, being built on the site of an old brick works and sandstone quarry. In 2008 it underwent a complete revamp with the old buildings being pulled down and eight new large retail unit being built for shops such as Halfords. Development in recent years has given the area at the foot of Leppings Lane a Burger King and a Carphone Warehouse, built utilising the roof of the former service station on the site. There are three public houses in Wadsley Bridge, the New Bridge Inn dates from 1833, originally the New Inn but renamed in the 1970s when the new railway bridge was constructed, the Railway and the Pheasant. Recently demolished are the Gate Inn which dated originally from 1828; it was demolished in the early 1970s when the A61 was widened and new pub put in its place, and the Travellers which dated from 1881 although parts of the building were probably much older. Both pubs were demolished in late August 2012 to make way for a Sainsbury's supermarket. Construction of the supermarket was started in May 2014 and it opened on 26 November 2014.
