= Benjamin Jacob =

English organist, conductor, and composer

Benjamin Jacob (1 April 1778 – 24 August 1829) was an English organist, conductor, and composer. He was a pupil of Willoughby, William Shrubsole, and Samuel Arnold (1796).

Jacob was born and died in London. He was an organist at various churches, finally at Surrey Chapel, Southwark (1794–1825). With Wesley and Crotch, he gave organ recitals to immense audiences from 1808 to 1814. He conducted a series of oratorios in 1800, and the Lenten Oratorios at Covent Garden in 1818. His works include National Psalmody (London, 1819) and other collections, as well as glees, songs, and an arrangement of the Macbeth music.
