= Frederick Trogisio =

Frederick Trogisio was a councillor of King Robert of Naples, who served as bailli of the Principality of Achaea from July 1318 until 1321.

His appointment marks the start of a series of foreign governors being appointed over the Principality. His tenure was troubled, both domestically, as Angevin control over the Principality was contested, as well as due to the threat posed by the Catalan Company, that had recently conquered the neighbouring Duchy of Athens. Most notably, the same period saw the expansion of the Byzantine province of Mystras: the bailli and his army were heavily defeated at the Battle of Saint George in September 1320 by the Byzantine sunder Andronikos Asen, leaving the centrally located province of Arcadia in Byzantine hands.

== Sources ==
- Bon, Antoine (1969). La Morée franque. Recherches historiques, topographiques et archéologiques sur la principauté d'Achaïe [The Frankish Morea. Historical, Topographic and Archaeological Studies on the Principality of Achaea] (in French). Paris: De Boccard.
- Topping, Peter (1975). "The Morea, 1311–1364". In Setton, Kenneth M.; Hazard, Harry W. (eds.). A History of the Crusades, Volume III: The Fourteenth and Fifteenth Centuries. Vol. 3. Madison and London: University of Wisconsin Press. pp. 104–140. ISBN 0-299-06670-3.

Preceded by Eustachio Pagano de Nocera	Angevin bailli in the Principality of Achaea; 1318–1321	Succeeded by Ligorio Guindazzo
