= Polyphengos =

Greek fortress and settlement

Map of the Peloponnese with its principal locations during the late Middle Ages

Saint George of Polyphengos (Italian: Sancto Georgio de Polifengno in a 1377 document) or simply Polyphengos (Greek: Πολύφεγγος; Polifant in the French Chronicle of the Morea) was a fortress and settlement of the Frankish Principality of Achaea in the Peloponnese. The settlement of Saint George was situated on the plain some 3 km from ancient Nemea, and occupied the space of the modern town of Nemea, while the fortress was situated on the top of Mount Polyphengos and controlled one of the passes leading from the plateau of Arcadia to the lowlands of the Argolic Gulf.

In September 1320, the Greeks under Andronikos Asen captured the fortress of Saint George in Skorta and defeated a relief force. They immediately followed up this success by advancing against the fortresses of Karytaina, Akova and Polyphengos and obtaining their surrender by bribing their commanders. This success gave the Greeks a strategic advantage as all these fortresses controlled passages through the mountains from the interior plateau to the still Frankish-held coastal plains. Polyphengos, however, may have been recaptured by the Franks some time after, as it appears in a list of fiefs of the Principality of Achaea in 1377.

In 1458 the town was captured and laid waste by the Ottoman sultan Mehmed II during his first campaign against the Despotate of the Morea.

== Sources ==
- Bon, Antoine (1969). La Morée franque. Recherches historiques, topographiques et archéologiques sur la principauté d'Achaïe [The Frankish Morea. Historical, Topographic and Archaeological Studies on the Principality of Achaea] (in French). Paris: De Boccard. OCLC 869621129.
- Vakalopoulos, Apostolos E. (1974). Ιστορία του νέου ελληνισμού, Τόμος Α′: Αρχές και διαμόρφωσή του (Έκδοση Β′) [History of modern Hellenism, Volume I: Its origins and formation] (in Greek) (2nd ed.). Thessaloniki: Emm. Sfakianakis & Sons.
