= Hugh Smith (cricketer) =

English cricketer

Personal information
- Full name: Hugh Purefoy Smith
- Born: 16 October 1856; Lasham, Hampshire, England
- Died: 9 September 1939 (aged 82); Brighton, Sussex, England
- Batting: Right-handed
- Bowling: Right-arm medium

Domestic team information
- Years: Team
- 1878: Sussex

Career statistics
Competition	First-class
Matches	1
Runs scored	10
Batting average	5.00
100s/50s	–/–
Top score	10
Balls bowled	120
Wickets	1
Bowling average	82.00
5 wickets in innings	–
10 wickets in match	–
Best bowling	1/82
Catches/stumpings	1/–
- Source: Cricinfo, 28 November 2011

Hugh Purefoy Smith (16 October 1856 – 9 September 1939) was an English cricketer. Smith was a right-handed batsman who bowled right-arm medium pace. He was born at Lasham, Hampshire.

Smith made a single first-class appearance for Sussex against Surrey at the County Ground, Hove in 1878. In Surrey's first-innings, he took the wicket of Swainson Akroyd for the cost of 82 runs from 30 overs. In Sussex's first-innings, he was dismissed for 10 runs by Edward Barratt. With Sussex following-on in their second-innings, he was dismissed for a duck by Frederick Johnson. This was his only major appearance for Sussex.

He died at Brighton, Sussex on 9 September 1939.
