= The Gospel Magazine =

Magazine

- May–June 2014 cover showing Blagdon Parish Church
- Editor: Edward J. Malcolm
- Categories: Religious, Calvinist, evangelical Christian
- Frequency: bi-monthly
- Publisher: Gospel Magazine Trust
- Founded: 1766
- Country: UK
- Language: en

The Gospel Magazine is a Calvinist, evangelical Christian magazine from the United Kingdom, and is one of the longest running of such periodicals, having been founded in 1766. Most of the editors have been Anglicans. It is now published bi-monthly.

A number of well-known hymns, including Augustus Montague Toplady's Rock of Ages, first appeared in the Gospel Magazine. Toplady, sponsored by Selina Hastings, Countess of Huntingdon, used the magazine to attack John Wesley. Other contributors included John Newton, the organist William Shrubsole (1760–1806), the hymn writer Daniel Turner (1710–98) and (at a later date) the particular Baptist minister John Andrew Jones (1779–1868).

The Gospel Magazine Trust is currently working to scan their extant copies—going back 240 years—and upload them onto the website.

== List of editors ==
- 1766–1774: Joseph Gurney (died 1815)
- 1774–1775 & 1776: William Mason (1719–1791)
- December 1775–June 1776: Augustus Montague Toplady
- 1776–1805: Erasmus Middleton (1739–1805)

Some time between 1783 and 1796 the Gospel Magazine was suspended for a period, and a magazine called the New Spiritual Magazine was produced.

- 1796–1838: Walter Row, a personal friend of Toplady
- 1839–1840: Bagnall Baker, a High Anglican (but not Anglo-Catholic)
- June 1840 – 1893: David Alfred Doudney (1811–1893)
- 1893–1894: George Cowell
- 1895–1916: James Ormiston, rector of St Mary le Port Church, Bristol
- 1916–1951: Thomas Houghton
- 1951–1964: William Dodgson Sykes
- 1964–1975: Herbert M. Carson (died 2004)
- 1976–1981: John Tallach, then Free Presbyterian minister in Kinlochbervie, later Church of Scotland minister in Cromarty until 2011
- 1981–2000: Maurice Handford
- 2000–2013: Edward Malcolm
- 2014–present: Edward J. Malcolm
