= Vincent Perronet =

Anglo-Swiss clergyman

Vincent Perronet (1693–1785) was an Anglo-Swiss clergyman of the Church of England, vicar of Shoreham and an early Methodist.

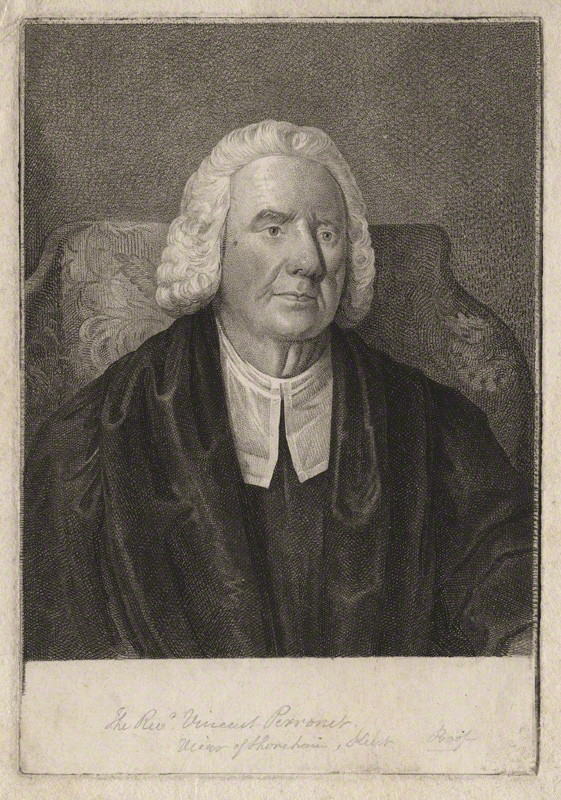
Vincent Perronet

== Life ==
Perronet was born in London on 11 December 1693, the youngest son of David Perronet and Philothea Perronet. His father was a native of Château-d'Œx, then under Bernese rule but now in the canton of Vaud. David was a descendant of the prominent Huguenot family de Saussure and the protestant Diodati family of Lucca through his mother Suzanne Mestral des Vaux. David Perronet came to England in about 1680 shortly before the revocation of the Edict of Nantes, was naturalised by act of parliament in 1708 and married Philothea Arther (or Arthur). David Perronet died in 1717. One of his elder brothers, Christian, was grandfather of the French engineer Jean Rodolphe Perronet.

Vincent Perronet, after receiving his earlier education at a school in the north of England, entered The Queen's College, Oxford, where he graduated B.A. on 27 October 1718; in later life, he was described as M.A. Having taken holy orders, he became curate of Sundridge, Kent, where he remained for about nine years. In 1728 he was presented to the vicarage of Shoreham in the same county and was chaplain to the Earl of Stanhope.

On 14 February 1744 he had his first interview with John Wesley, who was impressed by his piety. Both the Wesleys visited him and preached in his church in 1746. When Charles Wesley preached there a riot took place, and he was defended by one of Perronet's sons, Charles. The Wesleys looked to Perronet for advice and support: he was a close friend. He attended the Methodist conference of 15 June 1747. A letter from him in February 1751 led John Wesley to decide on marrying.

Perronet wrote in defense of the Methodists, and was called "the archbishop of Methodism". He encouraged a Methodist Society at Shoreham, headed by his unmarried daughter Damaris, entertained itinerant preachers, attended their sermons, and preached in his kitchen every Friday evening. He held a daily Bible reading in his house. In 1769 he suffered a long illness, and, whilst recovering in January 1770, received visits from John Wesley and from Selina, Countess of Huntingdon. In 1771 he defended Wesley against the countess and her party at the time of the Bristol conference.

In his last days, Perronet was attended by one of his granddaughters by his daughter Elizabeth Briggs. He died on 9 May 1785 in his ninety-second year and was buried at Shoreham by Charles Wesley, who preached a funeral sermon on the occasion. He owned a farm in the neighbourhood of Canterbury, and was in easy circumstances.

== Works ==
Perronet believed that he received many tokens of a special providence, and wrote a record of them, headed Some remarkable facts in the life of a person whom we shall call Eusebius, of which extracts were given in the Wesleyan Methodist Magazine for 1799. He relates dreams, escapes from danger, and the like, as divine interpositions.

Perronet gave himself to the study and exposition of biblical prophecy, specially with reference to the second advent and the millennium. He published:

- A Vindication of Mr. Locke, 1736. A defence of John Locke against Peter Browne.
- A Second Vindication of Mr. Locke, 1738. A defence of Locke against Joseph Butler and Isaac Watts. Perronet in this work was an early critic of Butler's view of personal identity. In so doing he reiterated a distinction of Locke between "human" and "person".
- Some Enquiries chiefly relating to Spiritual Beings, in which the opinions of Mr. Hobbes … are taken notice of, 1740. Against the materialism of Thomas Hobbes.
- An Affectionate Address to the People called Quakers, 1747.
- A Defence of Infant Baptism, 1749.
- Some Remarks on the Enthusiasm of Methodists and Quakers compared.
- An Earnest Exhortation to the strict Practice of Christianity, 1750.
- Third Letter to the author of the Enthusiasm of Methodists (in London Magazine 1752, p. 48).
- Some Short Instructions and Prayers, 4th edit. 1755.
- Some Reflections on Original Sin, &c., 1776.
- Essay on Recreations, 1785.

Also a Short Answer to the Heaven Open to All Men (Pierre Cuppé, anonymous).

Perronet's portrait was engraved by J. Spilsbury in 1787 (Bromley), and is given in the Methodist Magazine, November 1799.

== Family ==
On 4 December 1718 Perronet married Charity, daughter of Thomas and Margaret Goodhew of London. She died on 5 December 1763, in her seventy-fourth year, and was buried by John Wesley, who also visited Perronet in 1765 to comfort him after the loss of one of his sons. By his wife, he had at least twelve children, of whom Edward (1721 - 2 January 1792) is known as a hymn-writer. Charles, born in or about 1723, accompanied Charles Wesley to Ireland in 1747, became one of the Wesleys' itinerant preachers, was somewhat insubordinate in 1750, and offended John Wesley by printing and circulating a letter at Norwich contrary to his orders in 1754; he advocated separation from the church, and licensed preachers to administer the sacrament, against the orders of the Wesleys, and took upon himself to do so both to other preachers and some members of the society. He later ceased to work for the Wesleys, residing at Canterbury with his older brother Edward, where he died unmarried on 12 August 1776.

Of the other sons, Vincent, born probably in 1724, died in May 1746; Thomas died on 9 March 1755; Henry died 1765; John, born 1733, died 28 October 1767; and William who was a claimant in Switzerland to an inheritance on his father’s behalf died at Douai on 2 December 1781. Of Perronet's two daughters, Damaris was born on 25 July 1727, and died unmarried on 19 September 1782; and Elizabeth married, on 28 January 1749, William Briggs, of the custom-house, the Wesleys' secretary or "book-steward".

Elizabeth and Edward alone survived their father. Of all Perronet's children, Elizabeth alone had issue, among whom was a daughter, Philothea Perronet, married, on 29 August 1781, at Shoreham, to Thomas Thompson, merchant of Hull. From the marriage of Elizabeth Perronet to William Briggs was descended their grandson Henry Perronet Briggs.
