= Perronet de Villamastray =

Perronet de Villamastray served as bailli of the Principality of Achaea for Prince John of Gravina from November 1322 until 1323.

== Sources ==
- Bon, Antoine (1969). La Morée franque. Recherches historiques, topographiques et archéologiques sur la principauté d'Achaïe [The Frankish Morea. Historical, Topographic and Archaeological Studies on the Principality of Achaea] (in French). Paris: De Boccard. OCLC 869621129.
- Topping, Peter (1975). "The Morea, 1311–1364". In Setton, Kenneth M.; Hazard, Harry W. (eds.). A History of the Crusades, Volume III: The Fourteenth and Fifteenth Centuries. Vol. 3. Madison and London: University of Wisconsin Press. pp. 104–140. ISBN 0-299-06670-3.

Preceded by Ligorio Guindazzo	Angevin bailli in the Principality of Achaea; 1322–1323	Succeeded by Nicolas de Joinville
