= On the Street Where You Live (TV series) =

- Genre: Documentary
- Country of origin: Ireland
- Original language: English
- No. of series: 2
- No. of episodes: 12

Production
- Running time: 30 minutes

Original release
- Network: RTÉ One
- Release: 9 January 2009 – 5 August 2011

On the Street Where You Live is a two-series six-part documentary television series broadcast on RTÉ One in Ireland. Examining a different street each episode, the stories are told through local characters who have witnessed great changes come about on the streets of their home city throughout their lifetime. Some footage from the programmes is available to view online at RTÉ.ie. The series was originally aired in January – February 2009 each Friday at 19:30. Each episode is thirty minutes in length and featured streets from the cities of Dublin, Galway, Dundalk, Limerick, Cork and Kilkenny but in the second series was aired in July & August 2011 featured Tralee, Waterford, Derry, Sligo, and Ennis.

== Episode list ==
=== Series 1 ===
==== Programme one ====
The first programme focused on O'Connell Street in Dublin, the capital city of Ireland, and was broadcast on 9 January 2009. It features contributions from Carmel Moran, who lived on the street for thirty-five years and witnessed many events from her sitting room window above the Happy Ring House, Billy Fleming, whose father was a road worker on the street and who himself now drives the Number 11 bus up and down the street several times each day, Herbie Donnelly, who worked in different cinemas on O'Connell Street for fifty-one years until he retired eighteen years before the programme was made, and Pat Liddy, who worked in Aer Lingus on O'Connell Street for thirty years and is now a local historian.

==== Programme two ====
The second programme focused on Shop Street in Galway and was broadcast on 16 January 2009. It features contributions from Mary Bennett, who moved from County Clare to Galway in the late 1950s, built a business empire up from a souvenir stall in the Great Southern Hotel to a popular store (The Treasure Chest) located on Shop Street, Jimmy Griffin, who is a member of the fourth generation of Griffin's Bakers, established in 1876, and Pat McPhilbin, who worked in a bakery on Shop Street as a young boy and now cleans the streets for the Galway Corporation to a soundtrack of classical music.

==== Programme three ====
The third programme focused on Clambrassil Street in Dundalk, County Louth and was broadcast on 23 January 2009. It features contributions from Bernadette Kavanagh, whose grandparents ran Connell's drapery store (one of the oldest shop on the street) and whose brother inherited it, Harry Lee, who worked all his life in the shoe trade only to become a radio show host upon the death of his wife, Eamonn Coleman, who grew up over his father's butcher shop and remembers the car bomb which struck the street in 1975, and Hugh Smyth, a local historian who recalls his childhood memories from Clambrassil Street.

==== Programme four ====
The fourth programme focused on O'Connell Street in Limerick and was broadcast on 30 January 2009. It features contributions from Thecla Hartmann, who met her husband for the first time on O'Connell Street, and later asked him to dance for "Lady's Choice" in Cruises Hotel, Joe Malone, a regular of The White House Pub for approximately fifty years who fought in the Todds fire of 1959, Liam Hanley, whose childhood was spent living over the now demolished Listons Medical Hall on O'Connell Street (run by his father), and Mark Liddy, a local historian and tour guide in Limerick.

==== Programme five ====
The fifth programme focused on Patrick Street in Cork and was broadcast on 6 February 2009. It features contributions from Dick O'Sullivan, a local boy who had various jobs on the street and who played music in one of the shop windows, Louise Lee, who came to Cork during the 1960s and opened a Chinese restaurant on Patrick Street with her husband, Declan Hassett, whose girlfriend discarded him under Mangon's clock only for the relationship to redevelop and for him to later propose marriage to her at that same location and who spent some time working with the Irish Examiner, and Kay Bermingham, who grew up outside the city but is now a tour guide inside it.

==== Programme six ====
The sixth programme focused on High Street in Kilkenny and was broadcast on 13 February 2009. It features contributions from Pat Shortis, who has received recognition for his charity work and was the grand marshal of the 2008 Saint Patrick's Day parade, Anne Ryan, who entered into the family business of an electric shop at seventeen years of age when her mother became unwell, Jim Bourke, who left the priesthood and became a tailor in the family business of a big drapery store and Frank Kavanagh, who has had many different jobs on High Street and was an auxiliary fire fighter but now works in Kilkenny Castle.

=== Series 2 ===
==== Programme one ====
The first programme focused on Bridge Street & Castle Street, in Tralee, County Kerry and was broadcast on 1 July 2011.

==== Programme two ====
The second programme focused on O'Connell Street in Sligo was broadcast on 8 July 2011.

==== Programme three ====
The third programme focused on Barronstand Street in Waterford was broadcast on 15 July 2011.

==== Programme four ====
The fourth programme focused on Strand Road in Derry was broadcast on 22 July 2011.

==== Programme five ====
The fifth programme focused on Church Street in Athlone was broadcast on 29 July 2011.

==== Programme six ====
The sixth programme focused on Abbey Street, Parnell Street & O'Connell Street in Ennis was broadcast on 5 August 2011.

== Reaction ==
The series was well received by critics and the media, with newspapers in cities such as Galway and Limerick advertising the episode in which their street was featured. In the second series featured Tralee, Sligo and Waterford too name but a few.

Christmas 2021 all 12 programmes on the RTE Player to celebrate 60 Years Of Television.
