= Rock of Ages (Christian hymn) =

Christian hymn

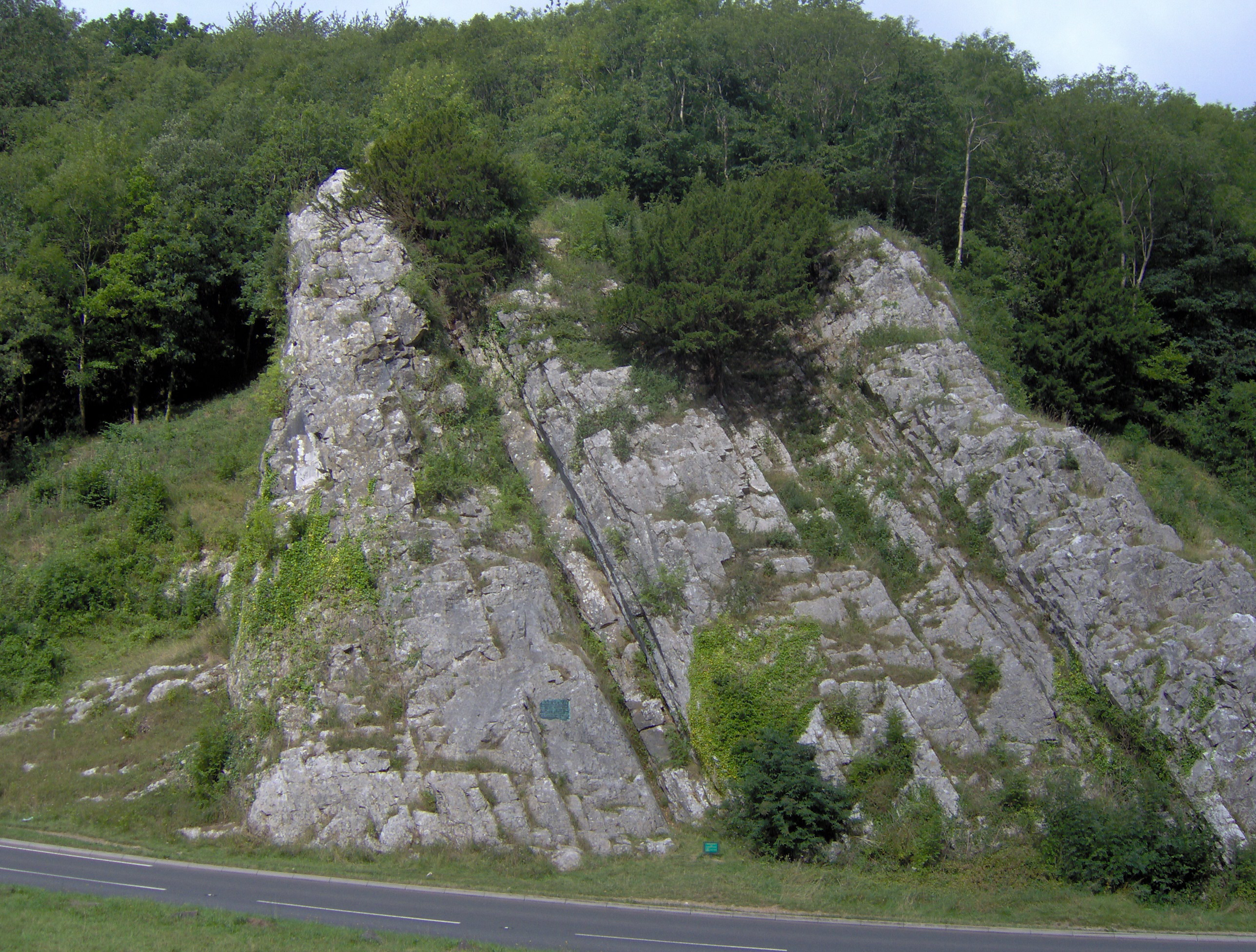
- The Rock of Ages, Burrington Combe where Rev. Augustus Toplady is reputed to have sheltered from a storm
- Genre: Hymn
- Written: 1763
- Text: by Augustus Montague Toplady
- Based on: footnote in the KJV for Isaiah 26:4
- Meter: 7.7.7.7.7.7
- Melody: "Toplady" by Thomas Hastings

"Rock of Ages" is a popular Christian hymn written by the Reformed Anglican minister Augustus Toplady.

== History ==
The first four lines for the first version of the first verse were published in The Gospel Magazine in October 1775. The first publication in full was in the March 1776 edition, with a revised first verse and three more verses. A slightly further revised version was published in July 1776 in Toplady's hymnal Psalms & Hymns for Public and Private Worship.

There is a popular story most hymnologists do not believe about the origin of this hymn text that started 122 years after publication of the hymn text by a letter published in the Times of London, 3 June 1898 from Dean Lefroy of Norwich, together with one from Sir W. H. Wills on the same matter. The burden of Lefroy’s correspondence is based on a claim made by Sir W. H. Wills regarding the origin of this hymn. Wills' claim asserted that Toplady drew his inspiration from an incident in the gorge of Burrington Combe in the Mendip Hills in England. Toplady, then a curate (assistant Church of England preacher) in the nearby village of Blagdon, was travelling along the gorge when he was caught in a storm. Finding shelter in a gap in the gorge, he was struck by the title and scribbled down the initial lyrics.

According to E. J. Fasham, a more likely inspiration for the text is a 1673 sermon by Daniel Brevint (who had been the Dean of Durham Cathedral). This sermon had been partially quoted in the preface to Charles Wesley's Hymns of the Lord's Supper (1745), which was in common use amongst a number of ministers of the period. The similarity between the passages from Brevint's sermon and the hymn suggests this was the starting point for Toplady's text.

== Commentary on lyrics ==
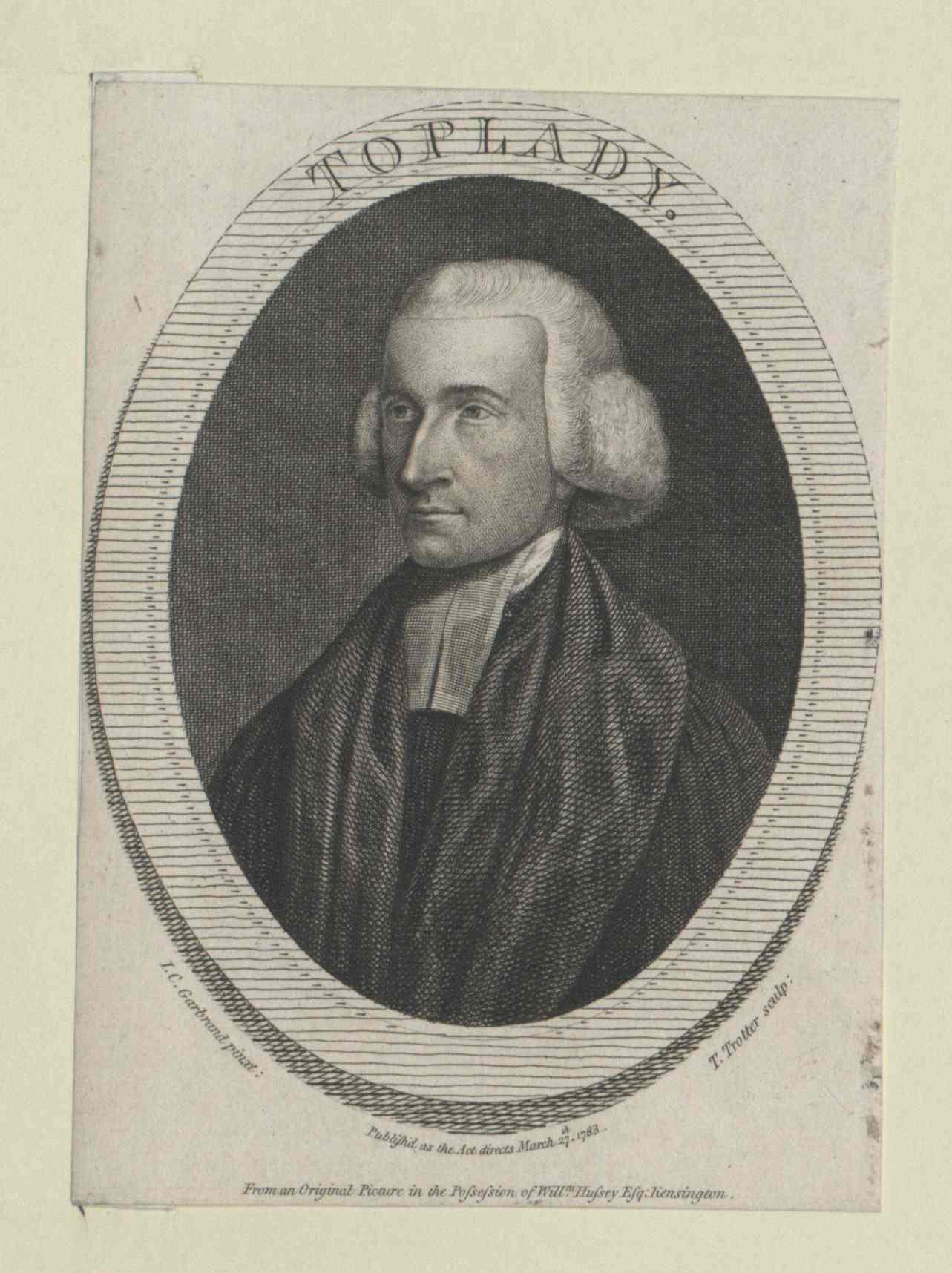
Augustus Toplady

The text of this hymn from Toplady's July 1776 'alt' version has been substantially edited since its publication by different denominations over the years creating a number of versions of the hymn text used by different churches around the world. An example of an edit made to Toplady's text is: "When my eyes shall close in death" was originally written as "When my eye-strings break in death". Not withstanding the bitter pamphlet war between Augustus Toplady and John Wesley over the correctness of Calvinist versus Arminian theology, there has been speculation by some, that although Toplady was a Calvinist, the edited version of the words, "Be of sin the double cure, Save from wrath, and make me pure," suggests he agreed with the teachings of the Methodist preacher under whom he received his religious conversion, and of his contemporary, John Wesley, who taught the "double cure", in which a sinner is saved by the atonement of Jesus, and cleansed from inbred sin by the infilling of the Holy Spirit. However, Toplady's own published 1776 hymn text, the version now referred to as 'alt', contains a variant different from Wesley's teachings and reads: "Be of sin the double cure, Save me from its guilt and power".

== Music settings ==
"Rock of Ages"
Organ solo

"Rock of Ages"
Edison Mixed Quartet, 1913, recorded on an Edison cylinder

In the United States "Rock of Ages" is usually sung to the hymn tune Toplady by Thomas Hastings as revised by Lowell Mason. In the United Kingdom the hymn tune Redhead 76 is most common. This tune is also called Petra, after Peter being referred to as the Rock by Christ, by Richard Redhead. Both tunes circulate in the churches of both countries. It is also sung to a number of additional tunes used in small numbers of hymnals. Perhaps the newest hymn tune for "Rock of Ages" is by James Ward included in the New City Fellowship's hymnal.

== Notable recordings ==
- 1914 Alma Gluck and Louise Homer – a popular version on the Victor label.
- 1949 Bing Crosby recorded it on 6 May 1949 for Decca Records and it was included in his album Beloved Hymns.

== Uses ==
The hymn was a favourite of Prince Albert, who asked it to be played to him on his deathbed, as did Confederate General J. E. B. Stuart. It was also played at the funeral of William Gladstone.

In his book Hymns That Have Helped, W. T. Stead reported "when the SS London went down in the Bay of Biscay, 11 January 1866, the last thing which the last man who left the ship heard as the boat pushed off from the doomed vessel was the voices of the passengers singing 'Rock of Ages'".

This hymn was regarded as one of the Great Four Anglican Hymns of the 19th century.

== Translations ==
The hymn has appeared in other languages including German (as "Fels des Heils") and Swedish ("Klippa, du som brast för mig"). There are also Latin translations by William Gladstone as "Jesus, pro me perforatus" and by Canadian linguist Silas Tertius Rand as "Rupes saeculorum, te". On reading this version, Gladstone wrote to Rand, "I at once admit that your version is more exact than mine". The song was translated into Malayalam as "Pilarnnoru Paaraye Ninnil Njaan Marayatte" by Rev. Thomas Koshy (Aatmopakaaari Achen).
