= William Russell (organist) =

English organist and composer (1777–1813)

- Born: 6 October 1777; London, England
- Died: 21 November 1813 (aged 36); Cobham Row, Coldbath Fields, Clerkenwell
- Education: University of Oxford (Mus. Bac.)
- Occupations: Organist; composer
- Years active: 1793–1813
- Employers: Great Queen Street; St. Anne's, Limehouse; Foundling Hospital
- Style: Classical; liturgical

William Russell (6 October 1777 – 21 November 1813) was an English organist and composer.

== Life ==
He was the son of William Russell, an organ-builder, and was born in London on 6 October 1777. From age seven, Russell was taught by the organists William Cope, William Shrubsole and John Groombridge. Between 1789 and 1793, he was deputy to his father, who was organist to St. Mary's, Aldermanbury.

In 1793, Russell was appointed organist to the Great Queen Street chapel; cathedral services were performed there until 1798, when the chapel became a Wesleyan meeting-house. On 2 September 1798, he was elected organist at St. Anne's, Limehouse. In 1801, he was elected to a similar post at the Foundling Hospital. Around the same time, he resumed musical studies under Samuel Arnold.

In 1808, Russell graduated Mus. Bac. at Oxford. He died on 21 November 1813 at Cobham Row, Coldbath Fields, in Clerkenwell.

== Works ==
Russell's organ voluntaries were in suite form. He published Twelve Voluntaries for the Organ or Pianoforte (1805) and a Second Book (1812). Job was an oratorio adaptation for organ or pianoforte, from Samuel Wesley, issued in 1826. He also composed music to Christopher Smart's Ode on St. Cecilia's Day (1800) and the Redemption of Israel, both of which were probably performed by the Cecilian Society, of which he was a member. A volume of psalms, hymns and anthems was compiled by him for the Foundling Chapel in 1809.

Through Arnold's influence, Russell obtained employment as composer and accompanist at theatres. Besides songs, he wrote overtures and incidental music. For Sadler's Wells he composed an overture to the Highland Camp (1800), as well as music to Old Sadler's Ghost, to the Great Devil (with Broad), to Harlequin Greenlander, to St. George, to Zoa, and to Wizard's Wake in 1802. For Covent Garden Theatre, he wrote a dance in Thomas Busby's Rugantino (1805), a new overture to Wild Islanders, and music for Adrian and Orilla (1806). For the Royal Circus, he prepared music for the pieces Harlequin and Time and False Friend (1806).

== Recordings ==
- William Russell: Complete Organ Voluntaries, John Kitchen (organ), Delphian
