= Sovereign Grace Advent Testimony =

Reformed Christian organisation in the UK

The Sovereign Grace Advent Testimony (SGAT) is a Reformed Christian organisation begun in 1918 (108 years ago) in the United Kingdom. It holds to a manifesto agreed in 1919.

SGAT's stated purpose is the promotion and diffusion of the faith, being the doctrine of God's sovereign grace in the matter of man's salvation, and the truth of the second advent of the Lord Jesus Christ.

The Sovereign Grace Advent Testimony publish books by authors such as Benjamin Wills Newton, George Müller, Samuel Prideaux Tregelles and Charles Haddon Spurgeon. Regular monthly meetings are held at New Life Bible Presbyterian Church in West Kilburn, London, including two conferences, in the Spring and Autumn.

== History ==
In the 19th century, Dr Horatius Bonar had edited a magazine entitled The Quarterly Journal of Prophecy. On his death, a Mr John Cox brought out a magazine entitled 'Old Truths'. When that ceased another magazine entitled Perilous Times was commenced edited by John Cox and G. T. Hunt.

The Sovereign Grace Advent Testimony was formed after World War I, when a group of men got together and expressed the view that rather than leave such vital testimony to magazines, an organisation should be set up to bear witness to the revealed truth of the doctrine of free and sovereign grace and the personal, post-tribulational, pre-millennial return of the Lord Jesus Christ.

The names of the men who joined together are all given on the original manifesto, each having signed the document. The Testimony was started in November, 1918 and the manifesto published early in 1919. Pastor John Hunt Lynn was chosen to be first chairman and Mr George H. Fromow was elected secretary. Both continued till the times of their home-call. Mr Lynn was taken at the age of 95 in February, 1941 and Mr Fromow, aged 85, in April, 1974.

In 1919 'Perilous Times' was incorporated into a magazine with a new title, 'Watching and Waiting'. The magazine continues to be published by SGAT with the subtitle 'Light For Perilous Times'. During 2013, 3000 copies of the magazine were distributed during each quarter throughout various parts of the world.

George H. Fromow was secretary for over 55 years and in his time the work spread worldwide. The wording of the manifesto has never been altered, although, strictly speaking, the land described as Palestine is now known as Israel.

A centenary conference was held at Westminster Baptist Church, 100 Horseferry Road, London on Saturday 24 November 2018.

In 1974, after Mr Fromow's death, Mr Stephen A. Toms took over as the secretary of the Sovereign Grace Advent Testimony.

Mr Brian McClung is the current secretary, having begun his role in 2025.

The Sovereign Grace Advent Testimony is registered with the Charity Commission for England and Wales.
