= Hugh Smith (physician) =

English medical writer

- Born: Hertfordshire
- Died: 26 December 1790; Essex
- Occupation: Medical writer

Hugh Smith (died 26 December 1790) was an English medical writer.

== Biography ==
Smith was son of a surgeon and apothecary. He was born at Hemel Hempstead in Hertfordshire. He studied medicine at Edinburgh University, and obtained the degree of M.D. on 22 April 1755. He at first practised in Essex, but came to London in 1759, and fixed his residence in Mincing Lane. In 1760 he commenced a course of lectures on the theory and practice of physic, which were numerously attended. These, together with the publication of ‘Essays on Circulation of the Blood, with Reflections on Blood-letting,’ 1761, gave him a wide reputation. In 1762 he was admitted a licentiate of the Royal College of Physicians. In 1765 he was elected physician to Middlesex Hospital, and in 1770 was chosen alderman of the Tower ward, a dignity which his professional duties compelled him to resign in 1772. About this time he removed to Blackfriars and devoted himself chiefly to consulting practice at home. He was accustomed to give two days of the week to the poor, from whom he would take no fee. He also assisted some of his patients pecuniarily. In 1780 he purchased a country residence at Streatham in Surrey. He died at Stratford in Essex on 26 December 1790, and was buried in the church of West Ham. Besides the work mentioned above, he wrote Formulæ Medicamentorum, London, 1772, 12mo.

He was author of:

- The Family Physician, London, 1760, 4to; 5th edit. 1770.
- Letters to Married Women, 3rd edit. London, 1774, 12mo; republished in France, Germany, and America.
- A Treatise on the Use and Abuse of Mineral Waters, London, 1776, 8vo; 4th edit., 1780.
- Philosophical Inquiries into the Laws of Animal Life, London, 1780, 4to.
- An Essay on the Nerves, London, 1780, 8vo.

He must be distinguished from Hugh Smith (1736?–1789), possibly his son. The latter graduated M.D. at Leyden on 11 November 1755, and practised at Hatton Garden, London. He married the daughter of Archibald Maclean, a lady of fortune, who inherited Trevor Park, East Barnet. He died, aged 53, on 6 June 1789, and was buried in East Barnet church.
