= Joanni Perronet =

French fencer

Joanni Maurice Perronet
Personal information
- Born: 19 October 1877 Paris, France
- Died: 1 April 1950 (aged 72) Paris, France

Sport
- Sport: Fencing
Medal record
Men's fencing
Representing France
Olympic Games
Silver medal – second place	1896 Athens	Foil, masters

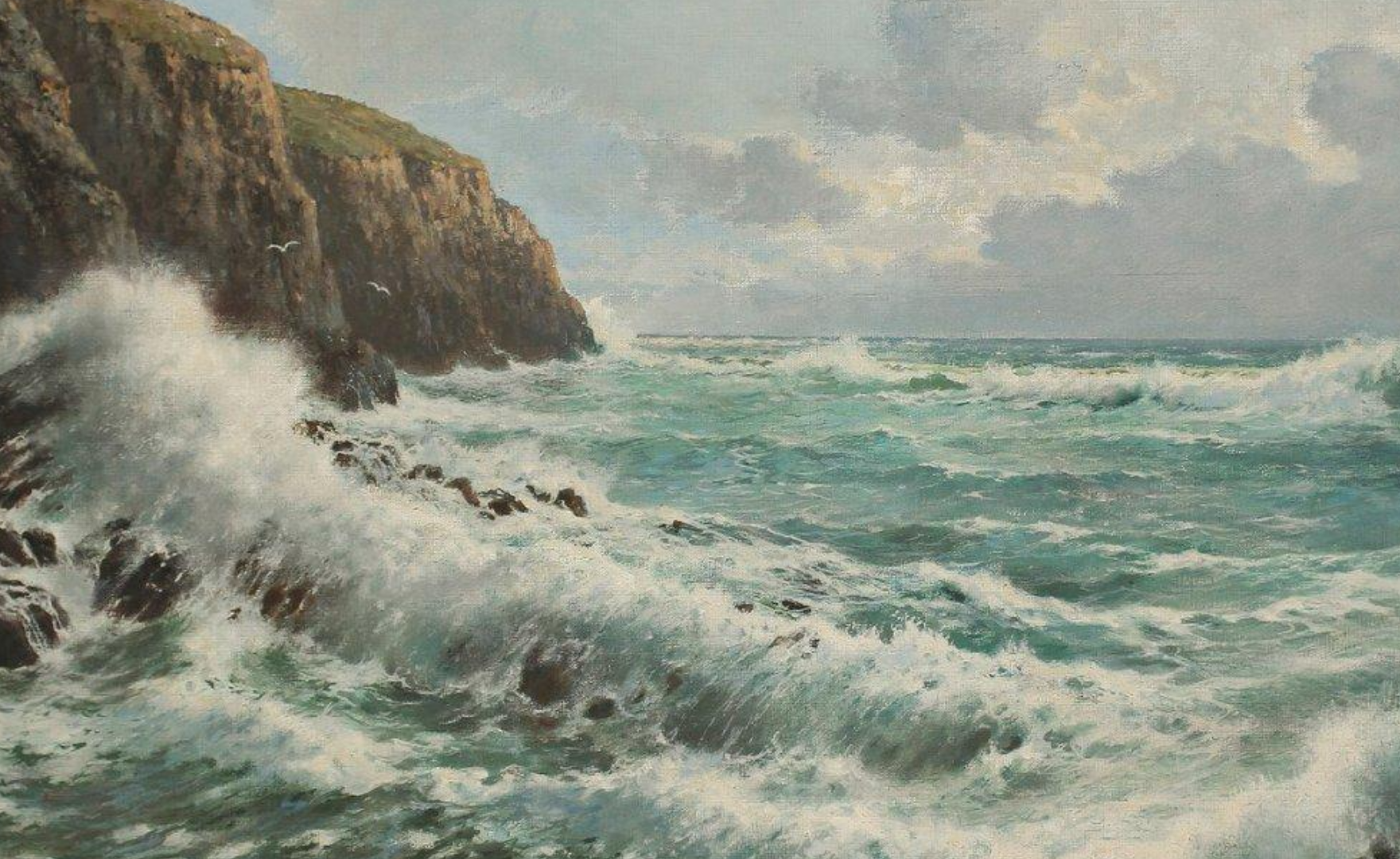
one of his seascapes

Joanni Maurice Perronet (French: [ʒɑ̃ mɔʁis pɛʁɔnɛ];19 October 1877 – 1 April 1950) was a French painter and fencer.

He was son of music composer Joanni Perronnet and Blanche Guérard, as well as grandson of the playwright and lyricist Amélie Perronnet.

He was a fencing master, the only professional allowed to compete in the Olympic Games at the time. Two such masters, Perronet and Leonidas Pyrgos of Greece, competed in a special foil fencing event at the first modern Olympics. The two faced each other in an event that consisted of a single bout to three touches. Perronet lost the bout, 3-1. He competed at the 1896 Summer Olympics in Athens, winning a silver medal.

He had close links to Sarah Bernhardt, she was his godmother. In 1908, he became secretary-general of the Sarah-Bernhardt Théâtre Sarah-Bernhardt.

He is known as a painter, most of his paintings are seascapes. He also designed many posters for French railway companies and painted several portraits of Sarah Bernhardt.
