= Edward Perronet =

Anglican preacher, hymn writer and poet

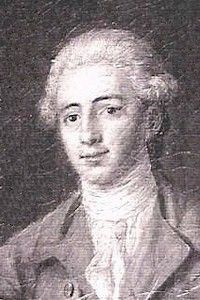
Edward Perronet

Edward Perronet (1721 – 2 January 1792) was the son of an Anglican priest, who worked closely with Anglican priest John Wesley and his brother Charles Wesley for many years in England's eighteenth century Christian revival.

He is perhaps most famous for penning the lyrics to the well known hymn, "All Hail the Power of Jesus' Name".

== Early life and education ==
Born in Sundridge, Kent, England, Perronet was the son of Vincent Perronet, and a descendant of a French Huguenot family which fled first to Switzerland and then to England to escape religious persecution.

== Preaching ==
At the time, persecution of Methodists was common. John Wesley once noted in his diary that Edward himself "was thrown down and rolled in mud and mire" at Bolton.

Though considered a capable preacher, Perronet was uneasy about doing so in front of John Wesley, despite Wesley's persistent urging. After wearying of his requests, Wesley simply announced one day that Brother Perronet would speak. Edward cleverly managed to escape Wesley's intention by mounting the pulpit, declaring he would deliver the greatest sermon ever preached, and proceeding to read Christ's "Sermon on the Mount"; after which, he immediately sat down.

Following worsening relations with the Wesleys, Perronet published The Mitre in 1756, a ferocious attack in verse on the Church of England and the notion that the Eucharist was a priestly rite only to be properly administered in England by Anglican priests. This provoked a schism with the Wesleys and Perronet's connection with organized Methodism came to an end. He preached in the Countess of Huntingdon's Connexion until his open aversion to the established church led to his becoming the minister of an Independent congregation.

== Writings ==
During his life, Edward published three volumes of Christian poems, including a poetic rendering of the Scriptures. Shortly before he died, 2 January 1792 in Canterbury, Kent, England, he uttered these last words: "Glory to God in the height of His divinity! Glory to God in the depth of his humanity! Glory to God in His all-sufficiency! Into His hands I commend my spirit."

== Legacy ==
Perronet's legacy lives on as Christian communities continue to sing what has come to be known as the "National Anthem of Christianity" in churches around the world... "All Hail the Power of Jesus' Name". Several of his hymns are also preserved in the Sacred Harp. His body is buried in Canterbury Cathedral, Kent, England.
