= Timeline of music in the United States (1820–1849) =

Timeline of music in the United States
To 1819; 1820–1849; 1850–1879; 1880–1919	1920–1949; 1950–1969; 1970–2000; 2001–present
Music history of the United States
Colonial era – to the Civil War – During the Civil War – Late 19th century – 1900–1940 – 1950s – 1960s – 1970s – 1980s

This is a timeline of music in the United States from 1820 to 1849.

== 1820 ==
- Anthony Philip Heinrich publishes a set of instrumental and vocal pieces, The Dawning of Music in Kentucky, his first published work in a long series that will make him the "chief composer of orchestral music" of the era.
- The Euterpeiad, published in Boston by the Franklin Music Warehouse (one of the first music stores in the country), becomes the first periodical entirely about music in the United States.

Early 1820s music trends
- The Boston 'Euterpiad becomes the first American periodical devoted to the parlor song.
- The all-black African Grove theater in Manhattan begins staging with pieces by playwright William Henry Brown and Shakespeare, sometimes with additional songs and dances designed to appeal to an African American audience. Ira Aldridge, the first renowned actor of African descent, is among the performers. He will later popularize "Opossum Up a Gum Tree", the earliest known slave song.
- John Cromwell becomes the leading African American singing school master in Philadelphia; his students will include other prominent masters, such as Robert Johnson and Morris Brown, Jr.

== 1821 ==
- The Quaker Levi Coffin gives an early account of an ancestor of African American spirituals.
- The black African Grove theater, led by Henry Brown, in Manhattan opens to the public, one of the earliest theaters to feature African American performers in full productions, also training the renowned Ira Aldridge.
- Lowell Mason publishes his first book of hymns, the Boston Handel and Haydn Society Collection of Church Music, which quickly becomes one of the most popular tunebooks of the era.
- The Army is reorganized, allowing musicians to be treated as privates in pay and allowances, and bands were officially allowed to form their own squad within each regiment.

== 1822 ==
- Thomas Hastings publishes his Dissertation on Musical Taste, the "first American treatise of its kind".
- John Cole forms an influential music publishing business with his son, located in Baltimore.
- English comedian Charles Matthews tours the United States, including a song in his act, "Possum up a Gum Tree", which he hears on his trip by African Americans at a theater in New York. His use of the song is the "first certain example of a white man borrowing (African American) material for a blackfaced act."

== 1823 ==
- Henry Rowley Bishop's Clari, or the Maid of Milan, with libretto by the American John Howard Payne, is premiered, both in London and New York. The melodrama becomes wildly popular into the 1870s, and one song, "Home! Sweet Home!", becomes one of the most popular of the 19th century. It will be the most popular song on both sides of the American Civil War.
- Dancing has become such an "integral part of a gentleman's education it was incorporated into the curriculum at West Point".
- The first piece of sheet music with a lithographed cover appears; it is "The Soldier Tired".
- The first Italian opera introduced to the United States is Gioachino Rossini's The Barber of Seville, performed in New Orleans, but in French.[33]
- Pierre Egan's Tom and Jerry, or Life in London is a hit play, presented at the African Grove Theatre, that establishing a common comic convention, that of the urban city slicker and a rural visitor.
- Giacomo Beltrami collects the oldest extant Native American flute, now in the collection of the Museo Civico di Scienze Naturali in Bergamo, Italy.

== 1824 ==
- James Caldwell, an Englishman in New Orleans, begins to show English opera at the Camp Street Theater; this is the beginning of English opera in New Orleans. Caldwell's company became rivals of John Davis' Théâtre d'Orléans.
- With the composition of The Saw Mill; Or, a Yankee Trick, Micah Hawkins becomes the first American-born composer to write both the music and libretto for an opera.

Mid 1820s music trends
- African American churches begin sponsoring concerts of sacred music in Eastern cities.

== 1825 ==
- The Park Theatre in New York City hosts a performance of The Barber of Seville by an opera led by Manuel García and aided by exptriate Lorenzo da Ponte. The show was very successful, and helped establish a market for continental opera in the United States. Maria García, the show's female lead, became the first female star singer in New York.
- The American piano industry begins with the patenting of a new construction for the instrument by Alpheus Babcock of Boston, which used a metal frame rather than a wooden one.
- The Independent Band of New York becomes the then "first important independent fully-professional band" in the country.
- James Hill Hewitt writes the parlor song "The Minstrels Return from the War", which becomes the first internationally successful by an American songwriter", and remains the most popular song until the advent of Stephen Foster. The song's success establishes Hewitt as the first American "compose parlor songs and market them successfully". "The Minstrels Return from the War" is the first song commonly perceived as truly American.
- The Forest Rose; Or, American Farmers by John Davies and Samuel Woodworth is probably the first opera with an African American female role in the country.
- The Army stops requiring officers to pay for the costs of forming a regimental band.

== 1827 ==
- The first black newspaper in the country, Freedom's Journal, is founded, containing, among other topics, announcements and advertisements for concerts and singing schools, and music editorials.
- New Orleans' Théâtre d'Orléans begins touring the major cities of the Northeast with non-English operas.
- Yale and Harvard University found the first collegiate bands in the United States.
- The seven-note "do-re-mi" system of musical notation is introduced, though it does not become common until after the Civil War.

== 1828 ==
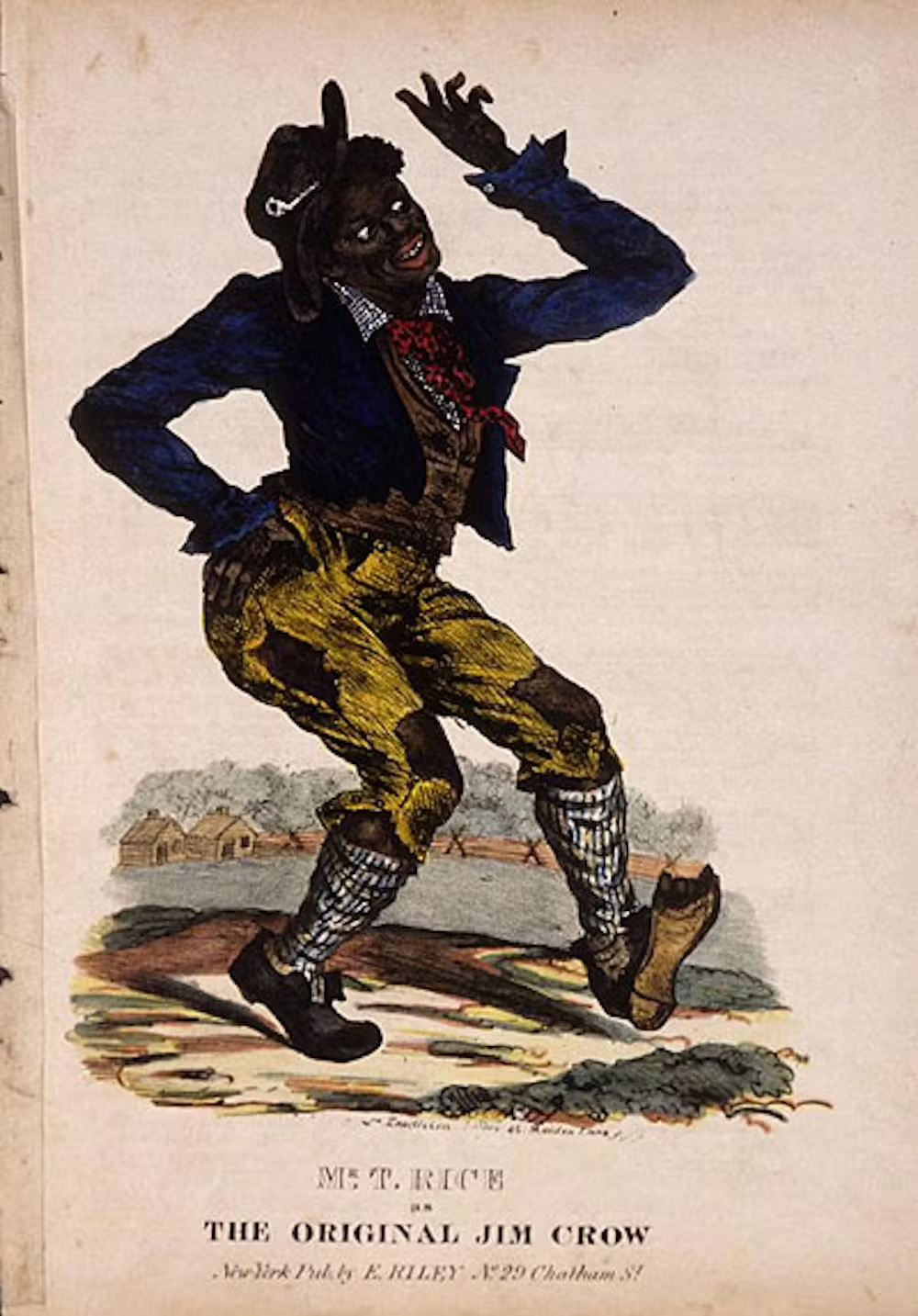
Cover to sheet music for "Jump Jim Crow", depicting Thomas D. Rice in his blackface costume.

- The Allentown Band is founded. It will become the oldest American band in continuous existence.
- Elizabeth Austin, a famed English singer from London, begins traveling across the eastern half of the United States. She becomes a major singing sensation.
- Street vendor Henry Anderson, also known as The Hominy Man, becomes a local legend in Philadelphia for his "strong, resonant 'tenor robusto' and the fact that his were 'the most musical of all cries'."
- St. Thomas Episcopal Church in Philadelphia becomes the first black church in the country to purchase a pipe organ, and the first to hire a black female organist, Ann Appo.
- Thomas D. Rice, an actor, creates a stage character called Jim Crow, based on a crippled African American stable groom's singing and dancing. Jim Crow became a stock character in blackface minstrel shows. Rice publishes "Jump Jim Crow", a fantastically popular song whose status will endure for decades.

Late 1820s music trends
- The banjo spreads from African Americans to whites, with the first documentation coming from Joel Walker Sweeney in Virginia. Sweeney will change the body of the banjo from the traditional gourd to a European drum shell.
- Showboats begin traveling along the Chattahoochee River, bringing the first professional entertainers to Columbus, Georgia and other towns along the river.
- Marches have become the most prominent part of military and other large band repertories throughout the United States. These are commonly characterized as using "fanfare-like melodies and a characteristic dotted rhythm motive.

== 1829 ==
- George Washington Dixon, a blackface performer, introduces a popular song, "Coal Black Rose", which is said to be the first blackface comic love song.
- Henry E. Moore leads the first singing school conventions, for singing masters, in Concord, New Hampshire and other areas.

== 1830 ==
- Approximate: Lowell Mason forms the earliest known formal singing school for children. The school is free.
- The first documented reference to a performance that is a "definitive account" of spirituals.
- General Winfield Scott heads a board to prepare a tactics manual, which provides a place for musicians in the regimental order of battle. The manual also contains the musical signals used by Army musicians.

== 1831 ==
- Anthony Philip Heinrich composes Pushmataha, a Venerable Chief of a Western Tribe of Indians; this has been called the influential composer's artistic peak, and is also when Heinrich became the first "American composer to celebrate the customs of North America's native peoples".
- American copyright law recognizes music "as a form of culture that required systemic protection".
- Elizabeth Austin, an English singing star, stars in the premier of Michael Rophino Lacy's Cinderella, or the Fairy and the Little Glass Slipper, which made her a household name across much of the United States.
- Joshua Leavitt, a Congregationalist minister (and later a prominent abolitionist publisher), publishes The Christian Lyre, the "first American tunebook to take the form of a modern hymnal, with music for every hymn (melody and bass only) and the multistanza hymns printed in full, under or beside the music. The Christian Lyre and this year's Spiritual Songs for Social Worship, compiled by Thomas Hastings and Lowell Mason, were widely adopted tunebooks in the 1830s New England Revivalism movement.
- Nat Turner's slave rebellion fails; the song "Steal Away", which may have been written by Turner himself, is sung during the rebellion, and it becomes one of the major songs of the spiritual tradition. Only much later does mainstream American discover that the song contains coded references to secret religious meetings.

Early 1830s music trends
- Quicksteps begin to replace marches as the most prominent music of the military and other large band repertory. This is, in part, spurred by the development of brass instruments, whose aptitude for playing melodies is reflected in the sprightly and flowing melodic style of quicksteps. Marches remain common in country dancing, as accompaniment for dances like the cotillion and the quadrille.

== 1832 ==
- Changes to Army regulations make bandsmen regular soldiers, required to serve in battle if needed, establishes a position for bandmasters, and limits the size of regimental bands.

== 1833 ==
- José de la Rosa, a guitarist, composer and printer, moves to California, where he will document the oldest-known transcription of Mexican-Californian song lyrics.
- Lorenzo Da Ponte and others back the building of New York City's first opera house.
- Lowell Mason and George James Webb found the Boston Academy of Music, which would teach both secular and religious music. This is the first music pedagogical institution in the country.
- The Mexican government secularizes the Roman Catholic missions of California and sends the local priests back to Spain. The music of these missions had been rooted in plainsong and polyphonic singing.
- The first building intended exclusively for the performance of opera in the United States is opened, in New York.

== 1834 ==
Mid 1830s music trends
- The Boston Academy of Music moves from education and sacred song into the cultivation of instrumental music by recognized European masters.
- John Hill Hewitt and other composers of popular parlor songs begin adopting influences from Italian opera, bringing a "new source of grace and intensity, as well as a tone of accessible elevation.

- Bob Farrell sings "Zip Coon", one of the most famous and enduring of minstrel songs, and claims to be its author; the tune also becomes a country fiddle standard as "Turkey in the Straw".
- The first convention of "singing masters" is organized by Lowell Mason, with the intent of improving the quality of music education in the United States.
- Thomas Dodworth begins using only brass instruments to play lead lines, the beginning of the modern brass band.
- The Boston Academy of Music provides instruction in the Pestalozzian system of music education, inspiring pedagogical conferences and conventions that culminate in the 1840 National Music Convention.

== 1835 ==
- The Boston Brass Band, led by Ned Kendall, becomes the first all-brass band in the United States.
- Issachar Bates writes "Come Life, Shaker Life", one of the most popular Shaker songs.
- James Caldwell shows an English adaptation of Giacomo Meyerbeer's Robert le diable, upstaging John Davis' Théâtre d'Orléans performance of the French version of the same opera. This production heightens English opera's prestige in New Orleans.
- William Walker's The Southern Harmony is published in New Haven, Connecticut, and compiled in Spartanburg, South Carolina. It became one of the most popular tunebooks of the mid-19th century, and had a lasting influence on shape note singing.
- Oliver Ditson founds a music publishing company, which will become the most important such company in the country by the 1880s.

== 1836 ==
- The Boston Billings and Holden Society publishes The Billings and Holden Collection of Ancient Psalmody, a collection of church songs presented in their "original character instead of in the 'improved' versions of Mason and his associates". The book is published for the benefit of the elderly, which may be an "early example of musical consideration for the benefit of 'senior citizens'".
- Music education is first introduced into the public school system of New York City.
- Lowell Mason's Manual of the Boston Academy of Music is published, becoming the most oft-used music instruction book of the era.

== 1837 ==
Late 1830s music trends
- Touring by European bands becomes commonplace across North America, as more inhabited areas have grown large enough to make performances commercially viable.
- American military bands and other ensembles adopt the "Turkish" or "Janissary" percussion instrumentation of triangle, bass drum, cymbal and tambourine.
- The banjo begins to be used as a solo instrument in minstrel shows, which will soon settle on the standard quartet of banjo, fiddle, tambourine and bones.

- Lowell Mason begins teaching singing, without pay, in Boston's public schools, becoming the first to teach music there. The local school board had already authorized the teaching of music, but hadn't allocated any funds for the subject. Mason's volunteer teaching constitutes the beginning of music education in American public schools. Later in the year, music is introduced to the public school system of Buffalo, New York.
- Chickering patents the first of several technical innovations that will make that firm the most important manufacturer of pianos in the country.
- The Shakers begin a revival, which produces a large body of songs that endure as part of their canon, including songs said to be received from the spirits of famous leaders, Native Americans and others.
- African American ensemble Francis Johnson's Orchestra becomes the first American groups to travel to Europe.
- The first sheet music with a full color illustrated front cover is published.

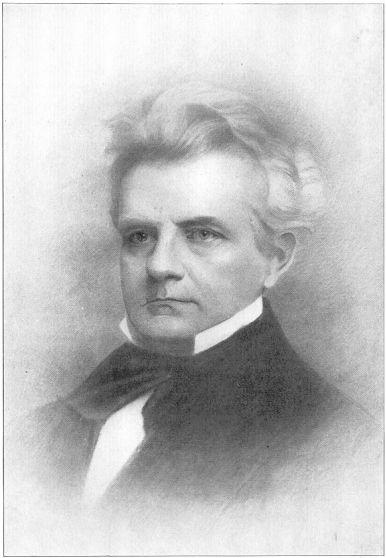
Lowell Mason

== 1838 ==
- Francis Johnson presents the country's first promenade concert in Philadelphia.
- Encouraged by the success of Lowell Mason's experiment in volunteer singing instruction, the Boston school board declares music a school subject and hires Mason as Superintendent of Music. Mason is the first person in the country to serve in that position for a public school system. This is the beginning of music education in public schools in the United States.
- The Marigny Theater opens in New Orleans to cater to free African American audiences, banning both whites and slaves, and producing light French comedies and musical shows.
- The Richmond Theater, the premier concert stage in the city, is renovated and renamed the Marshall Theater.
- Allen Dodworth patents horns worn over-the-shoulder to project the sound behind the performer. This is intended for use in military contexts, and leads to military bands becoming almost exclusively brass bands.

== 1839 ==
- The Rainer family emigrates to the United States, beginning a craze for a new style of "public popular music performance... based on the four-part glee".
- William Henry Harrison's presidential campaign becomes the first to use music and campaign songs as an integral part of its strategy.

Early 1840s music trends
- Brass bands spread across the United States, and are a well-established part of local musical life.
- Pianos have become an increasingly common household item, and are owned by most families that are capable of affording one.
- An African American dance technique using the heel of the foot without raising the rest of front of the foot dates back to this era; it will eventually become the basis for the stop-time ragtime dance.

== 1840 ==
- The Theatre de la Renaissance opens in New Orleans, with members of the local Negro Philharmonic in the orchestra, offering full-length plays, variety shows and other productions, intended for African American audiences.

== 1841 ==
- Justin Miner Holland becomes the first "professional black musician" to study at Oberlin College, one of very few colleges to accept African Americans prior to the Civil War.
- Lowell Mason's collection of Christian songs, Carmina Sacra, sells a record 500,000 copies between its release this year and 1858.
- Ludwig van Beethoven's Symphony No. 1 is performed for the first time in Boston, indicating a growing acceptance for the work of European composers, led by the likes of music critic John Sullivan Dwight
- William B. Bradbury, an organist and choir leader in a Baptist church in New York, publishes The Young Choir, a highly successful tunebook aimed at Sunday schools. He will become one of the most popular publishers of church music of the era.
- The number of musicians in an Army band is increased from 10 to 12.
- The Mother Bethel A.M.E. Church in Pennsylvania becomes the first in the country to introduce choral singing. The national conference of the Church passes a resolution to "strenuously oppose" the use of hymns with refrains, added to the standard pieces, which were introduced by African Americans to the texts.
- The first production of Norma by Vincenzo Bellini in the country, at the Chesnut Street Theatre in Philadelphia, adapted by Joseph Fry.
- Music education is introduced into the public school system of Chicago.

== 1842 ==
- Singing is a common activity at the newly founded Convent of the Holy Family, the first convent for African American women.
- E. P. Christy presents a show in Buffalo, New York that may be considered the first minstrel show, though the Virginia Minstrels' performance the following year had a grander impact.
- The Hutchinson Family Singers are joined by eleven-year-old Abby Hutchison, the first female member, and the group begin performing across the United States, becoming some of the first performers to make social causes, such as abstaining from alcohol and abolitionism, a part of their concerts and their image.
- Master Juba, an African American performer, is described as the "greatest dancer known" by Charles Dickens. He is one of the first blacks to perform onstage for white audiences. He is the first popular African American to perform in blackface.

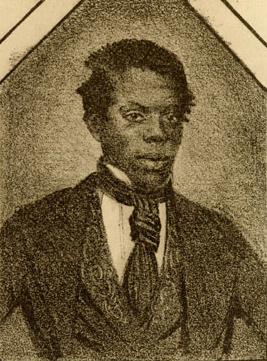
Master Juba

- The term minstrelsy begins to be used to describe blackface entertainment.
- The oldest professional orchestra in the United States, the New York Philharmonic Society, forms as a cooperative venture among performers. Among the performers at the first concert is Anthony Philip Heinrich.

== 1843 ==
- The Hutchinson Family Singers have become the "best known and most influential musicians in the United States".
- Joshua V. Himes, a leader of the apocalyptic Millennialist movement, publishes The Millennial Harp, which will become a major part of music for the Millennialist and their successors, the Seventh-day Adventists.
- Michael William Balfe composes The Bohemian Girl, which incorporates Italian operatic idioms and is received in the United States with "great acclaim". The aria "I Dreamt That I Dwelt in Marble Halls" becomes particularly popular.
- The first historically notable compilation of Shaker music is published, A Short Abridgement of the Rules of Music, by Isaac N. Young.
- The Steinway family open up a piano-making business, Steinway & Sons, in New York.
- Performances in New York and Boston by the Virginia Minstrels herald the beginning of the American minstrel show tradition. They present the first minstrel show with all the characteristics now associated with, thereby establishing that as the most popular form of musical theater in the 19th century. This is, for most northern whites, their first exposure to African American music. Music historian David Wondrich called the Virginia Minstrels the first band perceived as truly American, playing music of a distinctly American style.
- Music education is first introduced into the public school system of Buffalo, New York.

== 1844 ==
- Benjamin Franklin White and Elisha J. King publish The Sacred Harp, a collection of old American songs, and one of the greatest commercial successes in music publishing; the book remains in print as of 2001. It will be the most influential and longest-lasting shape-note tunebook in American history.
- "The Blue Juniata" by Marion Dix Sullivan is one "of the most popular parlor songs of the (19th century and) the first composition by an American woman to become a commercial hit song".
- The polka is introduced to the United States at a theater in New York.
- Stephen Foster publishes his first song, "Open Thy Lattice, Love", through George Willig in Philadelphia (words by George Pope Morris); he will go on to become the most successful songwriter of the 19th century.

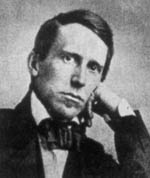
Stephen Foster

- Music education is first introduced into the public school system of Pittsburgh, Pennsylvania, New Orleans, Louisiana and Louisville, Kentucky.
- The African American Master Juba defeats a renowned dancing master in a contest promoted by P. T. Barnum. Juba is considered one of the major innovators of black dancing, especially tap dancing.

== 1845 ==
- "Wake, Lady Mine" is written, by Augusta Browne; it will become one of her most renowned songs, and will establish her career as the most prolific American female composer of the era.
- Henry Rowe Schoolcraft publishes Onéota, or Characteristics of the Red Race of America, one of the first publications to include a Native American song, specifically one called "Death Song" and collected from the Ojibwa. It is published without music.
- Justin Miner Holland, a freeborn African American, begins his composing career and opens a studio in Cleveland; he was, perhaps, the first black composer whose "African roots... played little or no role in his professional life".
- Music education is first introduced into the public school systems of Cincinnati, Ohio and Washington, D.C.
- The growing Anglo-Texan population declares independence from Mexico, leading to Tejano music becoming distinct from other regional styles of Mexican music as Tejano identity becomes more pronounced than Mexican among Texans of Spanish descent.
- Thomas Commuck, with Thomas Hastings, publishes Indian Melodies... Harmonized by Thomas Hastings, a collection of hymns which uses Native American names and other details in the lyrics, an unusual practice for the time.
- W. C. Peters and Son is founded, soon becoming the largest music publishing firm in the Midwest.
- William Henry Fry's Leonora is the first grand opera by an American-born composer to "receive wide-ranging publicity and reviews".

== 1846 ==
- Musical activity in the Catholic missions of California cease, the result of Mexican secularization and selling, which began in 1833.
- Christy's Minstrels of Buffalo, New York, settle in New York City and become one of the most popular minstrel troupes in the city.
- Music education is first introduced into the public school system of Cincinnati, Ohio.
- Jesse B. Aikin's The Christian Minstrel firmly establishes "shape-note singing as an important factor in the growth and popularity of what would later be called gospel music". It is also the most enduring system of seven-syllable shape-note transcription in the United States.

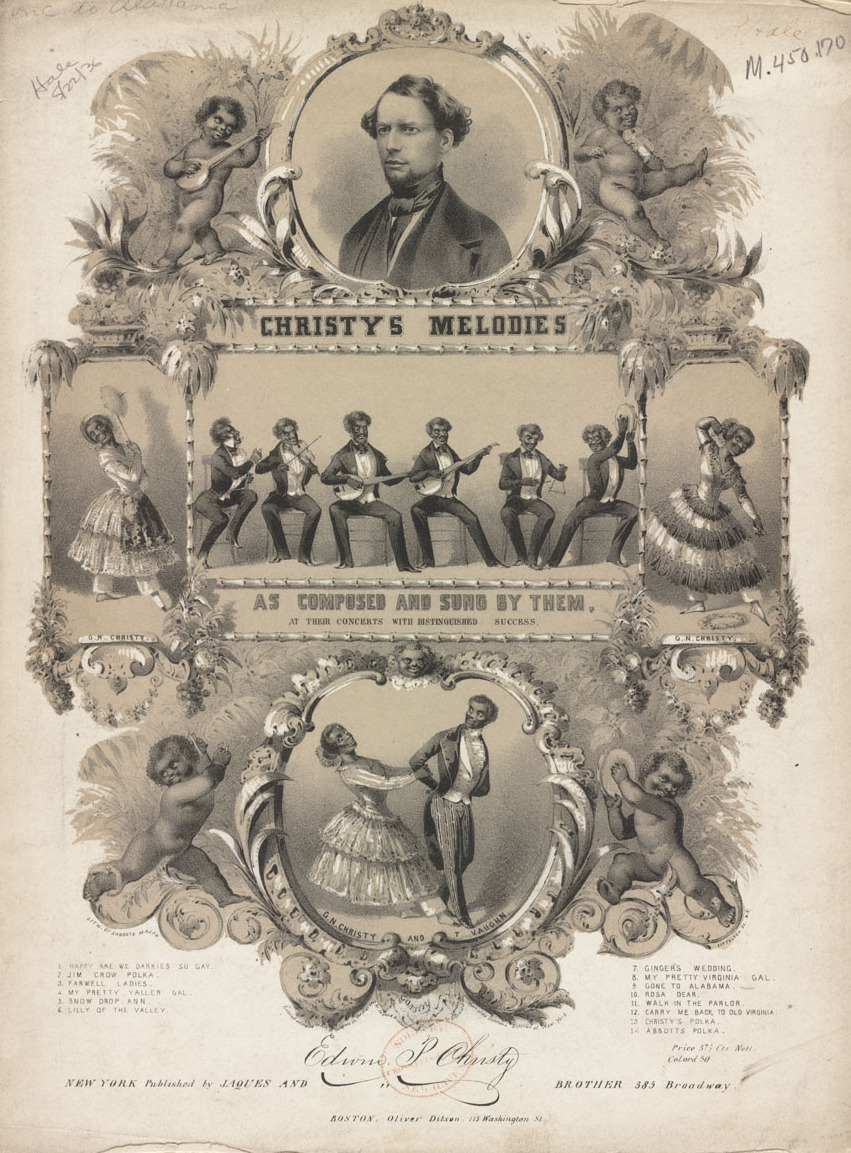
Sheet music for Christy's Minstrels

- Master Juba, a popular African American performer on the musical stage, becomes the first black member of a white performing troupe when he joins Charley White's minstrel show as a dancer and tambourine player.
- The Negro Singer's Own Book is the first published "collection of purely African American songs".
- Russel Haskell's A Musical Expositor is a major publication of Shaker music.
- New York's Trinity Church completes the construction of an organ, which is the largest organ in the country, reflecting the growing importance of the organ in American life.
- The Mexican–American War begins. Bandsmen will be employed in nonmusical capacities, such as stretcher carriers and messengers, and many musicians will not perform at all during the entire war.

== 1847 ==
- Stephen Foster's "Oh! Susanna" is published; it becomes immensely successful around the world, and is characteristic of the minstrel stage; it is "musically derived from the Anglo-American fiddle tune repertoire (and) adds an additional measure of rhythmic excitement and places greater emphasis on the refrain".
- German immigration to the United States begins to shift from religious refugees to political exiles, following a revolution in Germany.
- A collection of traditional church songs, Ancient Harmony Revival, becomes popular, providing momentum for a movement away from the modernized songs popularized by Lowell Mason and others.
- Army bands are increased in size from 12 to 16. Regulations also require bands to be mustered in a separate squad, a precedent that leads to the modern practice of setting the band apart from the unit entirely.

Late 1840s music trends
- A wave of German immigration leads to the formation of a number of musical societies, like Arion Gesangverein (in 1850), the Saengerbund festival and music clubs, known as Musikverein groups.
- Memphis, Tennessee emerges as the center for theater in the state.

== 1848 ==
- An African Methodist Episcopal church in Baltimore becomes the first in the country to introduce instrumental music.
- Charles Aiken of Cincinnati publishes pioneering books for the education in music of elementary school-age children, before such children were commonly taught music.
- The California Gold Rush begins, bringing many new and diverse peoples and their musics to California, which had been dominated by the music of the region's Mexican inhabitants.
- Charles Lyell, a visitor to the Sea Islands, gives one of the earliest descriptions of an African American ring shout.
- The Germania Musical Society, which debuts in New York in 1848, is the most prominent of several German orchestras that tour the United States, bringing new popularity to performances by Classical and Romantic composers.
- Elder Joseph Brackett of the Shakers composes "Simple Gifts", the tune of which will later be used in Aaron Copland and Martha Graham's Appalachian Spring.
- Marcus Lafayette publishes The Harp of Columbia in Knoxville, using the European shape-note system, consisting of seven syllables rather than the more common four in North America.
- Peter O'Fake conducts the orchestra of the Newark Theatre, an "unprecedented activity for a black man".
- Music education is first introduced into the public school system of Chicago, Illinois, Philadelphia, Pennsylvania and Providence, Rhode Island.
- An article titled "Music Among the Deaf and Dumb", by william Wolcott Turner and David Ely Bartlett, published in the American Annals of the Deaf and Dumb, is the first to advocate music education for the hearing impaired.

== 1849 ==
- The first substantial wave of Chinese immigration to the United States begins, inspired by the California Gold Rush. The vast majority of these immigrants are from the coastal southern region of Guangdong; as a result, the dominant forms of Chinese-American music will remain Cantonese opera and other folk songs, as well as the Taishan tradition of muyulmuk'yu song.
- The German-American musician Hermann Kotzschmar moves to Portland, Maine; he will play a major role in that city's musical life, and make it a "thriving music center".
- Louis Moreau Gottschalk, then living in Paris, composes Bamboula, La savane, Le Bananier and Le Mancenillier, all based on Afro-American melodies; these works helped establish Gottschalk as a "musical representative of the Old World in the New". He will become the "first American concert artist and composer to achieve international renown."

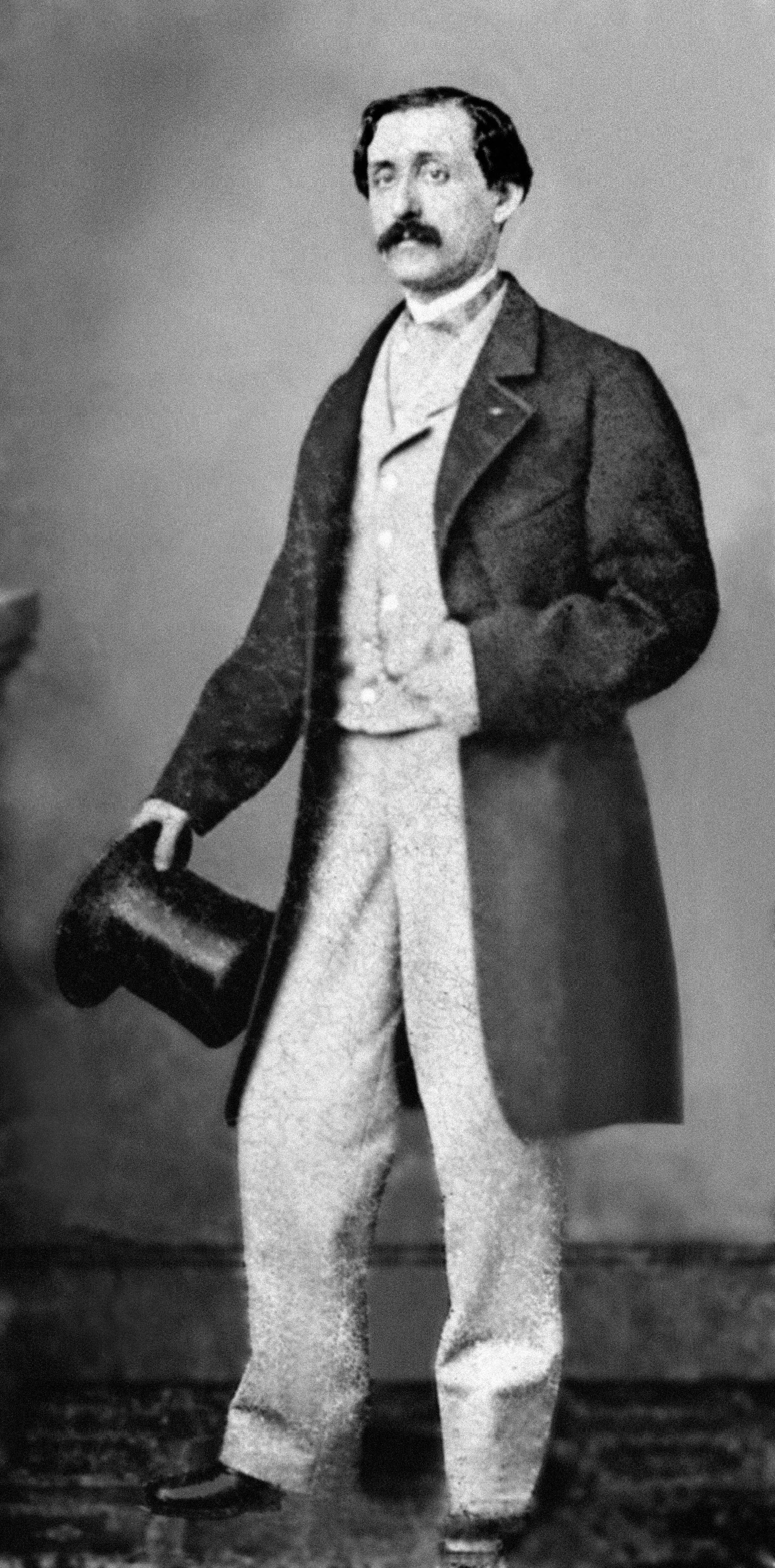
Louis Moreau Gottschalk.

- The ethnic music festival, Saengerfest, is first held around Cincinnati, Ohio and Louisville, Kentucky. Later known as the Cincinnati May Festival, it will become a major regional event.
- Stephen Foster writes "Nelly Was a Lady", the first American song to treat an African American woman as a lady worthy of respect.
- William Wells Brown' The Anti-Slavery Hope is a notable collection of most of the abolitionist songs in circulation at the time.
- A conflict between the supporters of a British and an American Shakespearean actor leads to the Astor Place Riots in New York City. Popular music historian Donald Clarke calls this a major turning point in American music history, marking the beginning of a split between highbrow and lowbrow entertainment and the beginning of specialized performances rather than pastiches and melodramas attempting to appeal to all consumers.
