= Henry Anderson =

Henry Anderson may refer to:

== Politics ==
- Henry Anderson (merchant) (c. 1484–1559), English merchant and politician
- Henry Anderson (politician, born 1545) (1545–1605), English merchant and politician
- Henry Anderson (Cavalier) (1582–1659), English Royalist and politician
- Henry Percy Anderson (1831–1896), British diplomat
- Henry W. Anderson (1870–1954), United States attorney and leader of the Republican Party in Virginia

== Sports ==
- Henry Anderson (American football) (born 1991), American football player
- Henry Anderson (English cricketer) (1803–1873), English cricketer
- Henry Anderson (Indian cricketer) (1867–1914), Indian cricketer
- Henry Anderson (footballer) (1892–1926), Australian rules footballer
- Henry Anderson (rugby union), Irish international rugby union player

== Other ==
- Henry Anderson (street vendor) (1800–?), American street vendor
- Henry James Anderson (1799–1875), American scientist
- Henry Charles Lennox Anderson (1853–1924), Australian scientist and librarian
- Henry Pope Anderson (1927–2016), farm labor union organizer, activist, author, and historian

== See also ==
- Harry Anderson (disambiguation)
