= Timeline of music in the United States =

Timeline of music in the United States
To 1819; 1820–1849; 1850–1879; 1880–1919	1920–1949; 1950–1969; 1970–2000; 2001–present
Music history of the United States
Colonial era – to the Civil War – During the Civil War – Late 19th century – 1900–1940 – 1950s – 1960s – 1970s – 1980s

This is a timeline of music in the United States. It is divided into several parts.

- To 1819
- 1820–1849
- 1850–1879
- 1880–1919
- 1920–1949
- 1950–1969
- 1970–2000
- 2001–present
