= Timeline of music in the United States (2001–present) =

Timeline of music in the United States
To 1819; 1820–1849; 1850–1879; 1880–1919	1920–1949; 1950–1969; 1970–2000; 2001–present
Music history of the United States
Colonial era – to the Civil War – During the Civil War – Late 19th century – 1900–1940 – 1950s – 1960s – 1970s – 1980s

This is a timeline of music in the United States from 2001 to the present, the 21st century.

== 2001 ==
- The Ken Burns television documentary series Jazz is watched by an estimated 60 million people and is said to have led to a doubling of jazz sales in the United States.
- After the terrorist attacks of September 11, 2001, television networks work together to show America: A Tribute to Heroes, a telethon to raise money for victims of the attacks. Music stars who perform include Neil Young, Willie Nelson, Bruce Springsteen and Paul Simon.
- A concert tour featuring Hakim, Khaled and Simon Shaheen is a historic event, signaling new acceptance for Arab music in the United States. Rachid Taha and Cheb Mami had toured earlier—all five performers are popular in the Arab world. The California-based record label Arc 21/Mondo Melodia is at the heart of the Arab music boom.

== 2002 ==
- George N. Thompson becomes the first African American to serve as head of the United States Navy's Musical Training Program.

== 2003 ==
- The Library of Congress inaugurates the National Recording Registry, inducting fifty historically significant recordings.
- A tribute is held to Sister Rosetta Tharpe, a gospel legend, at the Bottom Line Cabaret in New York, featuring performances from the Dixie Hummingbirds, Odetta, and others; the same year, a tribute album is released by MC Records, called Shout, Sister, Shout: A Tribute to Rosetta Tharpe.

== 2004 ==
- Jin becomes the first Asian American rapper on a major label with the release of The Rest Is History.

== 2005 ==
- Jeff Chang's Can't Stop Won't Stop is published. It will become one of the definitive histories of hip hop music.
