= Harry Anderson (disambiguation) =

Harry Anderson (1952–2018) was an American actor, comedian, and magician.

Harry Anderson may also refer to:

- Harry Anderson (coach) (1872–1957), American football coach
- Harry Anderson (Scottish footballer) (1888–1939), Scottish footballer (Raith Rovers, Hibernian, St Mirren, national team)
- Harry Anderson (artist) (1906–1996), American artist
- Harry Anderson (Canadian football) (c. 1926–1996), Canadian football player
- Harry Anderson (baseball) (1931–1998), American baseball player
- Harry Anderson (chemist) (born 1964), British chemist
- Harry Anderson (English footballer) (born 1997), English footballer
- Harry Anderson (American football) (1927–1997), American football player and coach
- Harry A. Anderson, US Army major in the Monuments, Fine Arts, and Archives program
- Harry B. Anderson (1879–1935), U.S. federal judge
- Harry Reuben Anderson (1844–1918), American general
- Harry W. Anderson (1922–2018), American businessman, art collector, and philanthropist

== See also ==
- Harold Anderson (disambiguation)
- Harry Andersson (1913–1996), Swedish footballer
- Harry Andersson (Djurgårdens IF Fotboll footballer), Swedish footballer
- Henry Anderson (disambiguation)
