= Harold Anderson =

Harold Anderson may refer to:

- Harold Anderson (basketball) (1902–1967), college men's basketball coach
- Harold Homer Anderson (1897–1990), American research professor of psychology
- Harold C. Anderson, American accountant and wilderness activist
- Hal Anderson (baseball) (1904–1974), baseball player
- Harold Anderson, character in 15 Maiden Lane
- Harold Anderson (illustrator) (1892–1973), American illustrator
- Harold David Anderson (1923–2020), Australian public servant and diplomat

== See also ==
- Harry Anderson (disambiguation)
