= Andrew Staples =

English operatic tenor

- Born: 19 August 1979 (age 45); London, United Kingdom
- Education: Eton College
- Alma mater: King's College, Cambridge
- Occupation: Operatic singer

Andrew Staples (born 19 August 1979) is an English operatic tenor.

== Education and training ==
Staples started as a chorister at St Paul's Cathedral and was accepted at Eton College under a musical scholarship.

== Career ==
With The Royal Opera, Staples has sung Tamino in Die Zauberflöte, Narraboth in Salome, and Artabenes in Arne's Artaxerxes. He has also sung at opera houses in Salzburg, Hamburg, Brussels, and Prague.

== Repertoire ==
- Die Zauberflöte, Tamino
- Salome, Narraboth
- Artaxerxes, Artabenes
