= Artaxerxes (opera) =

English opera by Thomas Arne

- Opera by Thomas Arne
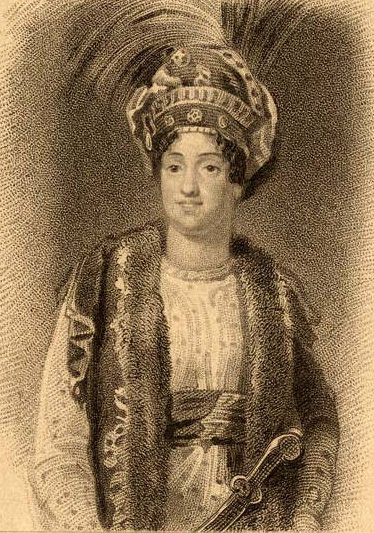
- Elizabeth Vestris en travesti in the title role in 1827
- Librettist: probably Arne
- Based on: Metastasio's Artaserse
- Premiere: 2 February 1762; Covent Garden theatre, London

Artaxerxes is an opera in three acts composed by Thomas Arne set to an English adaptation (probably by Arne himself) of Metastasio's 1729 libretto Artaserse. The first English opera seria, Artaxerxes premiered on 2 February 1762 at the Theatre Royal, Covent Garden, and continued to be regularly performed until the late 1830s. Its plot is loosely based on the historical figure, Artaxerxes I, King of Persia, who succeeded his father Xerxes I after his assassination by Artabanus.

== Performance history ==
The opening night of Artaxerxes (2 February 1762) at the Theatre Royal, Covent Garden, proved very successful. The work was revived at the theatre the following year, although this second run was marred by a riot. On 24 February 1763 a mob protesting against the abolition of half-price admissions stormed the theatre in the middle of the performance. According to a contemporary account in The Gentleman's Magazine:

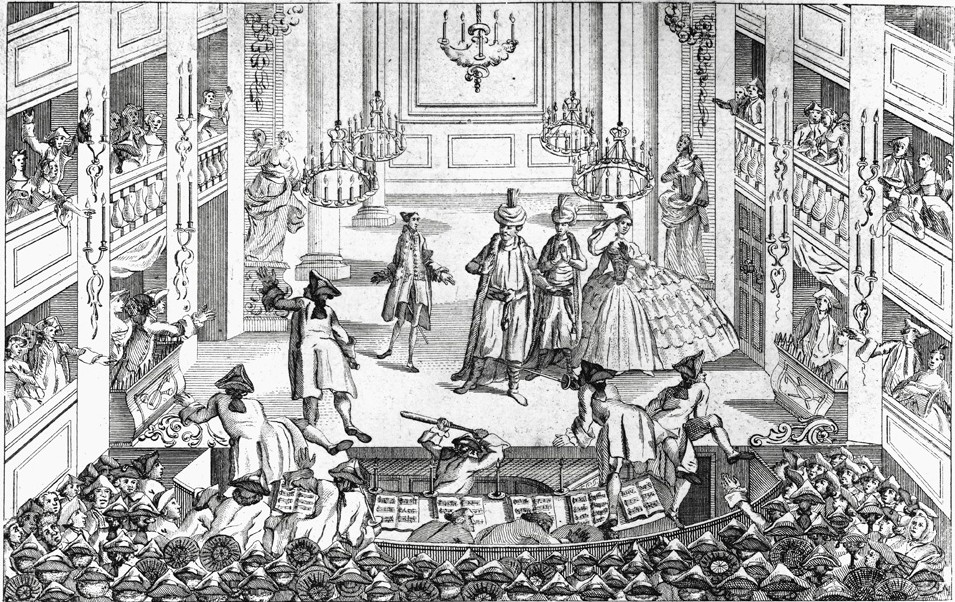
Riot over the abolition of half price admission fees at the Theatre Royal, Covent Garden, during a 1763 performance of Artaxerxes

The mischief done was the greatest ever known on any occasion of the like kind: all the benches of the boxes and pit being entirely tore up, the glasses and chandeliers broken, and the linings of the boxes cut to pieces. The rashness of the rioters was so great, that they cut away the wooden pillars between the boxes, so if the inside of them had not been iron, they would have brought down the galleries upon their heads.

By 1790, Artaxerxes had received well over 100 performances, including 48 in Dublin alone between 1765 and 1767. In the United States, the overture was played in Philadelphia as early as 1765, while arias from the opera were heard in New York City in 1767. The US premiere of the complete opera came on 31 January 1828 at the Park Theatre, in New York City, with a cast that included Elizabeth Austin as Semira. Artaxerxes remained in the London repertoire for over 70 years with regular revivals including those at the Drury Lane Theatre (1780, 1820, 1827, and 1828), Covent Garden (1813, 1827, and 1828), and the St James's Theatre (1836). The score for Artaxerxes had been published in 1762. However, it did not contain the recitatives or the final chorus. The original performing version of the score was lost in the fire that destroyed the Theatre Royal in 1808. After that date, performances of the work used a shortened version reconstructed by Henry Bishop and John Addison in 1813.

Notable modern revivals of the work include a 1962 performance in London's St. Pancras Town Hall as part of the St. Pancras Festival, a BBC concert performance in 1979, and another concert performance in 2002 by the Classical Opera Company conducted by Ian Page at St John's, Smith Square. To mark Thomas Arne's 300th birthday, a fully staged production of Artaxerxes was performed in October 2009 in the Linbury Theatre of London's Royal Opera House. The production was directed by Martin Duncan and designed by Johan Engels using a new performing edition of the score by Ian Page with a reconstruction of the final chorus by Duncan Druce. The cast included Christopher Ainsley as Artaxerxes, Rebecca Bottone, Caitlin Hulcup and Elizabeth Watts.

== Roles ==
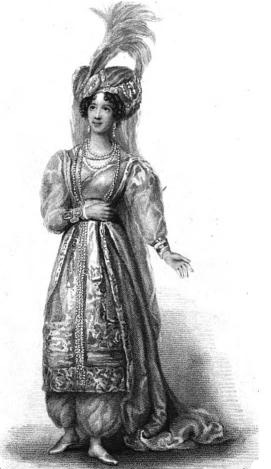
Mary Ann Paton as Mandane (1827)

Artaxerxes was composed when the castrato singers were at their height. The title role (Artaxerxes) and that of Arbaces were written for the Italian castrati, Nicolò Peretti and Giusto Fernando Tenducci respectively. With the waning of the castrati, the title role was sung by women en travesti in the 19th century. In the 1827 and 1828 performances in London, Artaxerxes was sung by the contraltos Eliza Paton and Elizabeth Vestris. In modern performances the role is often taken by a counter-tenor. The more virtuosic role of Arbaces went through a considerable amount of casting instability in the 19th century. It was sometimes sung by sopranos, and at other times transposed for tenors such as John Braham who sang the role 1827. Considered too high for a modern counter-tenor, Arbaces was sung by a mezzo-soprano, Patrica Spence, in the 1995 Hyperion recording. The role was also sung by a mezzo-soprano in the 2009 Royal Opera House revival.

Roles, voice types, premier cast
| Role | Voice type | Cast at 1762 premiere |
|---|---|---|
| Artaxerxes, Xerxes' younger son; Arbaces' friend | alto castrato | Nicolò Peretti |
| Mandane, Xerxes' daughter; lover of Arbaces | soprano | Charlotte Brent |
| Artabanes, general of Xerxes' army | tenor | John Beard |
| Arbaces, son of Artabanes | soprano castrato | Giusto Fernando Tenducci |
| Semira, Artabanes' daughter; lover of Artaxerxes | soprano | Miss Thomas |
| Rimenes, Artabanes' captain | tenor | George Mattocks |

== Synopsis ==
Setting: Ancient Persia c. 465 BC

The opera opens in a moonlit garden of Xerxes' palace. Mandane, the daughter of King Xerxes, and Arbaces, the son of the King's general Artabanes, are in love. Xerxes has opposed their marriage and banished Arbaces from the palace. Arbaces climbs the wall into the garden. As the young lovers express their love for each other and their despair at Arbaces' banishment, Artabanes arrives carrying a bloody sword. His fury at Xerxes' treatment of his son and his desire for Arbaces to become King have led him to assassinate Xerxes. Artabanes confesses the murder to Arbaces and exchanges his bloody sword for that of Arbaces.

Artaxerxes, the King's younger son, arrives with his guards. Artabanes tells him of his father's death and accuses Artaxerxes's older brother Darius of the murder, "Who but he at dead of night could penetrate The palace? Who could approach the royal bed? Nay, more, his royal ambition..." Artaxerxes commands Artabanes to avenge his father's death by killing Darius. Later in the garden, Artaxerxes expresses his love to Semira, the daughter of Artabanes and sister of Arbaces.

In the King's palace, the execution of Darius is announced. However, Rimenes (also in love with Semira) has Arbaces led into the chamber in chains, announcing that the bloody sword used to kill Xerxes had been found in his possession. Arbaces is now condemned to death. However, Artaxerxes, who had long been a friend of Arbaces, doubts his guilt. He releases Arbaces from prison and allows him to escape through a secret passage. Rimenes, encouraged by Artabanes, then goes off to lead a rebellion against Artaxerxes.

In the Temple of the Sun Artaxerxes, surrounded by his nobles, swears to maintain the rights, laws, and customs of his subjects and is about to pledge this by drinking from a sacred cup, unaware that Artabanes has poisoned the drink. Before Artaxerxes can drink from the cup, news arrives that Rimenes and his men are at the palace gates. The danger is averted when Arbaces kills the traitor, confirming to Artaxerxes that his friend is innocent. Artaxerxes then offers the sacred cup to Arbaces instead so that he may pledge his innocence.

Artabanes is now faced with seeing his son die or confessing the truth. He confesses to all that he has poisoned the cup, intending to kill Artaxerxes and that he had also assassinated Xerxes. Artabanes is led off in chains. Artaxerxes, out of his love for Semira and his gratitude to Arbaces, condemns their father to eternal exile rather than death. The opera ends with the two pairs of lovers reunited and the jubilation of all.

== Noted arias ==
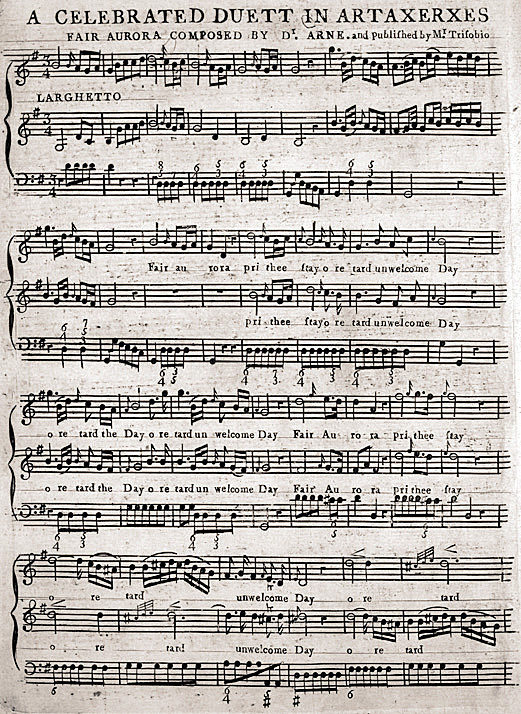
Piano–vocal score for "Fair Aurora, pr'ythee stay" (p. 1), published in Philadelphia in 1796

- "The Soldier, tir'd of war's alarms" (sung by Mandane in act 3) was a frequently performed recital piece for virtuoso sopranos, particularly in the 19th century. It was sung by Henriette Sontag in many of her American concerts, although one contemporary New York critic pronounced it "Nothing but a tie-wig-ish vocal exercise in triplets from beginning to end". Its popularity with singers continued into the 20th century. Both Joan Sutherland and Beverly Sills have recorded the aria.
- "Water parted from the sea" (sung by Arbaces in act 3) was a popular concert piece in the 18th and 19th centuries. There are also several allusions to it in James Joyce's Finnegans Wake. According to Green Room Gossip (London, 1808), its beauty caused considerable friction between Arne and Charlotte Brent, the first Mandane.
  When Dr Arne first brought the Opera of Artaxeres to a rehearsal, Tenducci sung the Air "Water parted from the Sea" with such effect that Miss Brent for whom the part of Mandane was composed, flew to Dr Arne with some violence, and told him "he might get whom he pleas'd to take Mandane; because he had given the best air in the piece to Tenducci." In vain the poor Doctor strove to soothe her – she was ungovernable. He retired from the theatre – sat down, and having written the first words of "Let not rage thy bosom firing" composed an air to them in the same character as "Water parted," though it is inferior in other respects: This he presented to Miss Brent, who being struck with the application of the first line to her own violence of temper, told the Doctor "that she was appeased, and would sing to the utmost of her ability to serve him."
- "O too lovely, too unkind" (sung by Arbaces in act 1) has been recorded by Marilyn Horne and appears on Decca's The Age Of Bel Canto. According to Simon Heighes, its orchestration with muted violins and a pizzicato bass was an influence on Philip Hayes's orchestration for the aria "Soon arrives thy fatal hour" in his 1763 masque, Telemachus.
- "Fair Aurora, pr'ythee stay" (sung by Arbaces and Mandane in act 1) was heard in the United States as early as 1769 in a concert at New York's Vauxhall Gardens and again in that city in 1794 in a concert at the City Tavern. It was also sung by Raynor Taylor and Miss Huntley in a concert in Philadelphia in 1796 and published that same year as an arrangement for piano and voice by Filippo Trisobio with the title, "A Celebrated Duett in Artaxerxes. Fair Aurora". Unlike the more bravura pieces in the opera, it was described by George Hogarth in 1835 as "a charming imitation of the simpler Italian style of that period".

== Recordings ==
A live recording of a 1979 BBC concert performance was once available on LP. However, the first major studio recording to be released on CD is from Hyperion Records.

- Artaxerxes (English Orpheus Vol 33) – Christopher Robson (Artaxerxes), Catherine Bott (Mandane), Patricia Spence (Arbaces), Ian Partridge (Artabanes), Richard Edgar-Wilson (Rimenes), Philippa Hyde (Semira); The Parley of Instruments; Roy Goodman (conductor). Label: Hyperion Records (released 1996 as CDA67051/2, re-released 2009 as CDD22073)

The performance of Artaxerxes at the Royal Opera House, Covent Garden in 2009 to celebrate Arne's 300th birthday was followed by release of a studio recording in 2010 by Linn Records.

- Artaxerxes – Christopher Ainslie (Artaxerxes), Elizabeth Watts (Mandane), Caitlin Hulcup (Arbaces), Andrew Staples (Artabanes), Rebecca Bottone (Semira), Daniel Norman (Rimenes); Classical Opera Company; Ian Page (conductor). Label: Linn Records (released 2010 as CKD 358)
