= Harry Anderson (Canadian football) =

Profile
- Position: T

Personal information
- Born: c. 1926; Calgary, Alberta, Canada
- Died: January 26, 1996
- Listed height: 6 ft 1 in (1.85 m)
- Listed weight: 175 lb (79 kg)

Career history
- 1945–1954: Calgary Stampeders

Awards and highlights
- Grey Cup champion (1948)

Harry "Auby" Anderson (c. 1926 – 1996) was a Canadian professional football player who played for the Calgary Stampeders. He won the Grey Cup with them in 1948. He was a constable with the Calgary Police Service and retired with the rank of Inspector after 33 years.

Anderson was a professional football player with the Calgary Stampeders from 1945 to 1952.
