= Henry Anderson (rugby union) =

Irish rugby union player

- Full name: Henry John Anderson
- Born: 17 March 1882 Cape Town, South Africa
- Died: 9 November 1949 (aged 67) Dublin, Ireland
- University: University College, Galway
- Occupation: Dentist

Rugby union career
- Position: Wing
International career
Years	Team	Apps	(Points)
1903–06	Ireland	4	(0)

Henry John Anderson (17 March 1882 – 9 November 1949) was an Irish international rugby union player.

A Galway dentist, Anderson played his rugby for University College Galway, Old Wesley and Galwegians RFC.

Anderson gained his Ireland call up from Old Wesley, making two appearances during the 1903 Home Nations, then a further two in 1906, all as a wing three-quarter.

In 1933, Anderson was appointed president of the Irish Dental Association.

Anderson became first representative from the Connacht Branch to serve as IRFU president in 1945–46. The first of Seven Galwegian clubmen to achieve the honour.

== See also ==
- List of Ireland national rugby union players
