= Harold Homer Anderson =

American research professor of psychology

- Born: October 23, 1897; Dakota City, Nebraska, U.S.
- Died: February 9, 1990 (aged 92)
- Education: Northwestern University
- Scientific career
- Fields: Psychology
- Institutions: Michigan State University

Harold Homer Anderson (October 23, 1897 – February 9, 1990) was an American research professor of psychology at Michigan State University, who published on child psychology, clinical psychology, personality, and cross-national research.

Anderson was the son of a minister from Nebraska, who studied at the Northwestern University. In 1933 he accepted a position as professor of psychology and head of the department at Michigan State College. In 1951 Harold H. Anderson was awarded the Alumni Medal of the Northwestern University. In the 1950s he was among the first members of the Society for General Systems Research.

== Work ==
=== Climate in the classroom ===
One of the earliest systematic studies of "climate" in the classroom was undertaken by Harold H. Anderson and Helen M. Brewer. These are reported in several papers and collected in the 1946 publication Studies of Teachers' Classroom Personalities. These researches were carried out in many schools and different classes from kindergarten to children in early adolescence. The aim was to make certain that behavior, as analyzed into different categories, could in fact be observed objectively.

Their recording of "dominative" and "integrative" actions of teachers and pupils in classroom interaction clearly demonstrated that acts of the teachers set behavior patterns that were reflected in classroom interaction generally.

=== Creativity and Its Cultivation ===
In 1957-1958 an Interdisciplinary Symposia on Creativity was held at Michigan State University. Contributions were made by Erich Fromm, Harold D. Lasswell, Margaret Mead, Abraham Maslow, R. May, Edmund Ware Sinnott, Harold H. Anderson himself, and others. Harold H. Anderson edited the symposium report with the main title: Creativity and its cultivation.

== Publications ==
- 1933, Behavior problems of the normal child
- 1937, Children in the family
- 1937, Domination and integration in the social behavior of young children in an experimental play situation.
- 1939, Domination and social integration in the behavior of kindergarten children and teachers.
- 1939, Mental Hygiene in Modern Education, with H. Rose and Etal Alschuler
- 1946, Studies of Teachers' Classroom Personalities, II; Effects of Teachers' Dominative and Integrative Contacts on Children's Classroom Behavior. with Joseph E. Brewer. Applied Psychology Monographs.
- Studies of Teachers' Classroom Personalities
- 1946, Follow-up Studies of the Effects of Dominative and Integrative Contacts on Children's Behavior. with J.E. Brewer and M.F. Reed.
- 1952, An Introduction to Projective Techniques & Other Devices for Understanding the Dynamics of Human Behavior, with Gladys L. Anderson. New York, U.S.A. Prentice-Hall.
- 1959, Creativity and Its Cultivation, addresses presented at the Interdisciplinary Symposia on Creativity, Michigan State University, East Lansing, Michigan. editor. New York: Harper and Row.
- 1965, Creativity in childhood and adolescence; a diversity of approaches. editor.

About Anderson

- Rabin, A. I., "Harold Homer Anderson (1897-1990): Obituary". in: American Psychologist. Vol. 46(9), Sep 1991, 982.
