= Henry Anderson (English cricketer) =

English cricketer

Personal information
- Full name: Henry Anderson
- Born: 13 October 1803; Highwood Hill, England
- Died: 18 September 1873 (aged 69); Dunster, England

Domestic team information
- Years: Team
- 1830: Marylebone Cricket Club

Career statistics
Competition	First-class
Matches	8
Runs scored	30
Batting average	2.30
100s/50s	0/0
Top score	13
Catches/stumpings	1/–
- Source: CricketArchive, 10 August 2008

Henry Anderson (13 October 1803 – 18 September 1873) was an English cricketer who played first-class cricket for the Marylebone Cricket Club, A to K, Single, and Sir St Vincent Cotton's XI. His highest score of 13 came when playing for the Marylebone Cricket Club in the match against Middlesex.
