= Henry Anderson (footballer) =

Australian rules footballer

Personal information
- Full name: Henry Edmund Anderson
- Born: 23 May 1892; Ararat, Victoria
- Died: 30 October 1926 (aged 34); Armadale, Victoria
- Original team: Kerang
- Height: 170 cm (5 ft 7 in)

Playing career^{1}
Years	Club	Games (Goals)
1913	Fitzroy	6 (0)
- ^{1} Playing statistics correct to the end of 1913.

Henry Edmund Anderson (23 May 1892 – 30 October 1926) was an Australian rules footballer who played with Fitzroy in the Victorian Football League (VFL).

He later enlisted for service in World War I, serving in the 23rd and 65th Battalions before being transferred to the Employment Company. Anderson was hospitalised several times and also went AWOL several times during his four years of service.
