= Harry Reuben Anderson =

US army general

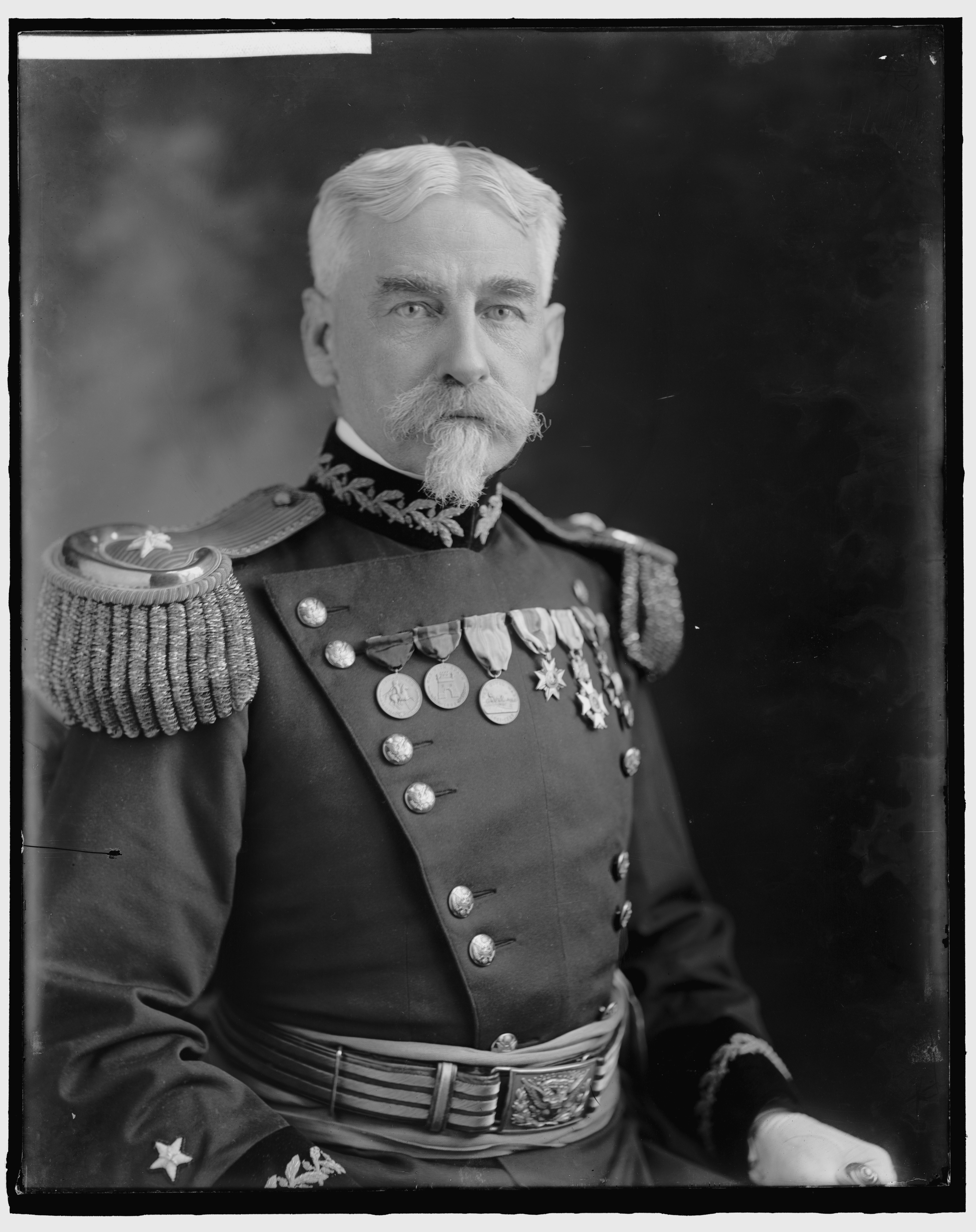
- Born: January 20, 1844; Chillicothe, Ohio, U.S.
- Died: November 22, 1918 (aged 74); Circleville, Ohio, U.S.
- Burial place: Arlington National Cemetery
- Education: United States Military Academy
- Military career
- Allegiance: United States

United States Army General Harry Reuben Anderson (January 20, 1844 – November 22, 1918).

== Biography ==
He was born on January 20, 1844, in Chillicothe, Ohio as Henry Reuben Anderson to Eliza Ann and William Marshall Anderson. He attended St. Joseph's College (Perry County, Ohio) in Perry County, Ohio. He was appointed to the United States Military Academy.

He died on November 22, 1918, in Circleville, Ohio. He was buried at Arlington National Cemetery.
