= Henry Anderson (Europeans cricketer) =

Indian cricketer

Personal information
- Full name: Henry Lawrence Anderson
- Born: 2 June 1867; Lucknow, North-Western Provinces, British India
- Died: 29 October 1914 (aged 47) near La Gorgue, Nord, France

Domestic team information
- Years: Team
- 1892–95: Europeans

Career statistics
Competition	First-class
Matches	2
Runs scored	11
Batting average	5.50
100s/50s	–/–
Top score	5
Balls bowled	40
Wickets	1
Bowling average	40.00
5 wickets in innings	–
10 wickets in match	–
Best bowling	1/13
Catches/stumpings	2/0
- Source: ESPNcricinfo, 2 August 2020

Henry Lawrence Anderson (2 June 1867 – 29 October 1914) was an Indian first-class cricketer and British Indian Army officer.

== Life and military career ==
Born in Lucknow in 1867, Anderson was educated at Dulwich College. Appointed in the King's Own Yorkshire Light Infantry in August 1888, he was stationed in British India by January 1890, as he appeared in an amateur cricket match for Bombay Gymkhana in that month. Anderson was promoted to lieutenant on 26 March 1890 and the following month transferred to the Indian Staff Corps. He appeared in a second amateur match in December 1892 for Poona Gymkhana against Lord Hawke's XI during their tour of Ceylon and India in 1892-93.

Anderson played in two first-class matches for Europeans between 1892 and 1895, both of which were against Parsees. In his debut between 19 and 21 September 1892 at the Poona Gymkhana Ground, Anderson scored 10 runs in his first innings and 1 in his second. He also caught DE Modi off the bowling of Harry Lowis. Anderson's second match took place at the Gymkhana Ground between 23 and 24 August 1895, during which he gained a wicket.

Anderson was promoted once more to captain on 22 August 1899 and saw active service in Tibet between 1903 and 1904. On 22 August 1906, he was promoted to major. At the outbreak of the First World War in August 1914, Anderson was promoted to lieutenant-colonel and became the second-command of the 9th Bhopal Infantry. The battalion was deployed to France, where Anderson was killed in action on 29 October 1914 by a shell near La Gorgue. He was buried at Pont-du-Hem Military Cemetery, La Gorgue.
