= Elizabeth Austin (soprano) =

British opera singer and actress

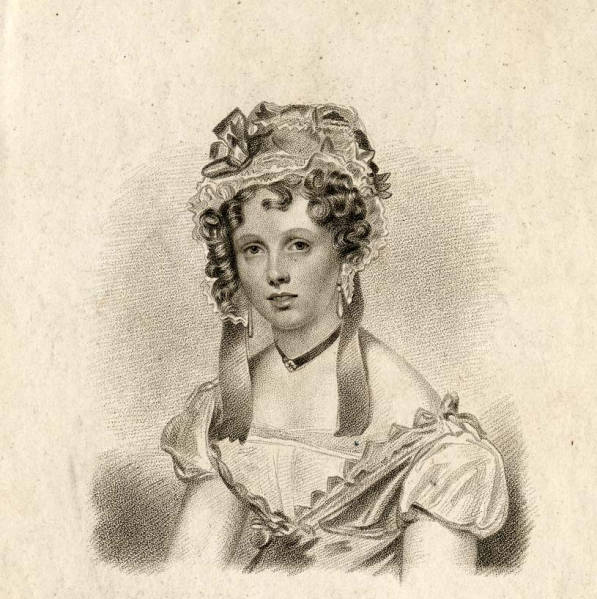
Elizabeth Austin as Rosetta in Thomas Arne’s Love in a Village, 1822

Elizabeth Austin (c. 1800 – after 1835) was an English opera singer and actress who achieved particular fame in America, where between 1828 and 1835, she was considered the reigning prima donna of the day. Critics at the time compared her to Maria Malibran and commented on the remarkable purity and sweetness of her voice, which extended to nearly three octaves. Although trained in England, she was considered a supreme representative of the florid Italian singing style.

Austin was born in Leicester. Her performances in Dublin in 1821 led to engagements at the English Opera House and the Theatre Royal, Drury Lane where she debuted on 23 November 1822. Austin made her American debut on 10 December 1827 as Rosetta in Thomas Arne’s Love in a Village at the Chestnut Street Theatre, Philadelphia. She sang the same role for her New York City debut at the Park Theatre on 2 January 1828. Following her performances there, one New York critic described her voice as "liquid tones coming as softly on the sense of hearing as snow upon the waters, or dew upon the flowers".

During the next seven years, guided by her manager (and lover), F.H.F. Berkeley, she toured the eastern half of the United States extensively, appearing in both operas and concerts. She starred in several American premieres, including Arne's Artaxerxes and the English versions of Auber's Fra Diavolo and Boieldieu's The White Lady and The Caliph of Baghdad.

Following the arrival in America of the Scottish soprano Mary Anne Paton Wood in late 1833, Austin's popularity began to wane. Her last performance was on 8 May 1835 at the Bowery Theater in New York as Diana Vernon in Isaac Pocock's Rob Roy Macgregor. Shortly afterwards, she returned to England and retired from the stage.
