= Henry Anderson (street vendor) =

Street vendor

Henry Anderson (born c. 1800) was an American Philadelphia-area street vendor known as The Hominy Man, who became a local legend, beginning in about 1828, for his cries, which he used to hawk his wares. His were said to be the "most musical of all cries", and he was noted for his "strong resonant 'tenor robusto'".

Two examples of his cries:

Hominy man come out today
For to sell his hominay [sic?]

De hominy man is on his way
From de navy yard
With his harmony

== Notes ==
- Hester, Karlton E. (2004). Bigotry and the Afrocentric Jazz Evolution. Global Academic Publishing. ISBN 1-58684-228-5.
- Southern, Eileen (1997). Music of Black Americans. New York: W.W. Norton & Co. ISBN 0-393-03843-2.
