= Music history of the United States in the late 19th century =

The latter part of the 19th century saw the increased popularization of African-American music and the growth and maturity of folk styles such as the blues.

== African-American music ==
=== Rag ===
In the 1890s, more sophisticated African-American styles of the cakewalk and then ragtime music started to become popular. Originally associated primarily with poor African Americans, ragtime was quickly denounced as degenerate by conservatives and the classically trained establishment. In spite of the denigration, however, the style continued to gain widespread popularity and became mainstream; it was adopted by Tin Pan Alley at the start of the 20th century.

Ragtime shared similarities with both blues and jazz, the two rival forms of African-American music at the time. It was primarily piano-based, and could be performed by a single person (more like the blues) or by an entire orchestra (more like jazz). Scott Joplin was the most famous ragtime musician.

Rag also shares strong similarities with German polka music, with the strong emphasis on beats 2 and 4. Both styles also rely upon 7th and 9th chords, resulting in a more sophisticated harmonic palette. From the Caribbean islands and other sources, Rag adopted strong syncopations in both the left and right hands of piano music.

== Minstrelsy ==
Solo performers in blackface were well known by the middle of the 19th century. Similar parodies of Africans had been popular during the late 18th century in England, and they spread across the Atlantic through the efforts of comedians like Charles Mathews, Thomas Rice and George Washington Dixon. Rice remains perhaps the best known, chiefly through the historical importance of his "Jump Jim Crow". The first minstrel group was probably the Virginia Minstrels, who performing in 1843 in New York City (Chase, 232), though E. P. Christy's four-man show in Buffalo, New York the year before is another contender. Many other groups soon followed, usually using a banjo, violin, castanets and tambourine. Thomas Rice and other blackface entertainers adapted to minstrelsy; Rice wrote operas like Bone Squash Diavolo before his popularity declined in the 1850s. Another minstrel opera group was the Kneass Opera Troupe, which did blackface parodies of Rossini's La Cenerentola, Balfe's The Bohemian Girl and Auber's Fra Diavolo. These parodies were given titles like Son-Am-Bull-Ole for a parody of Bellini's La somnambula, the invented title being a humorous reference to the violinist Ole Bull. Minstrel shows spread to London by 1846m and remained a major fixture in London until at least the 1880s.

=== Black minstrels ===
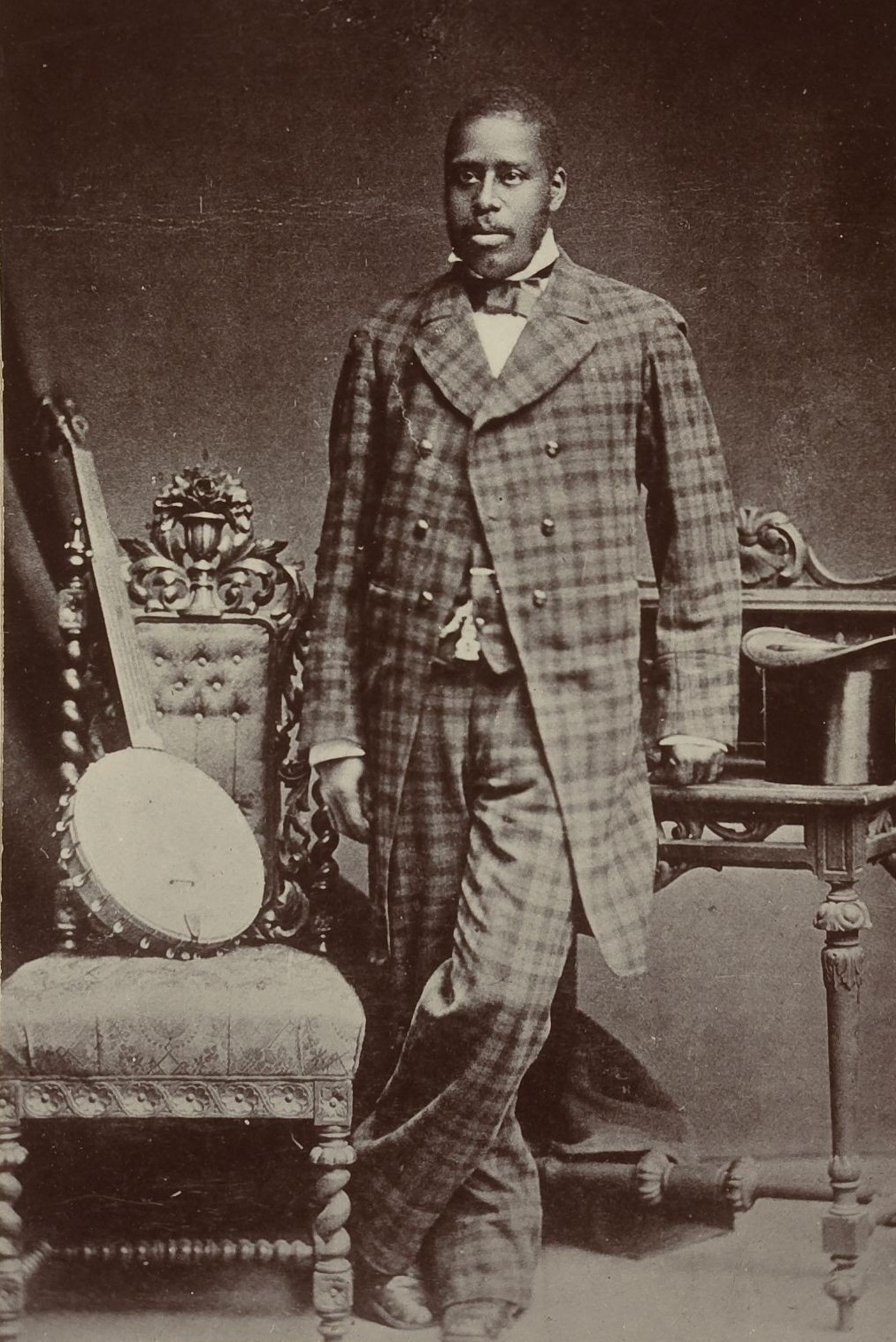
Banjo player Horace Weston

By the end of the civil war, minstrel groups had appeared featuring actual black performers. Though their styles were no more similar to actual slave practices than those of the white minstrels, these groups billed themselves as more "authentic" and grew popular. Since many of the performers were light-skinned, black performers still rubbed their faces in cork, and entertained in blackface. This practice peaked in about 1872, having produced such stars as banjoist Horace Weston and comedian Billy Kersands.

=== Blackface ===
A component of minstrel shows, blackface performances included white (or, more rarely, African-American) singers dressed in bizarre costumes, their faces marked black with burnt cork, singing in a caricature of African-American Vernacular English. Composers included E. P. Christy, Daniel Decatur Emmett and Thomas Rice; the latter's "Jump Jim Crow" was an immensely popular song, so well known and widely played that foreign leaders mistook it for the American national anthem. Other songs typically performed in blackface included "Camptown Races", "Old Dan Tucker", "Dixie", "Old Folks at Home", "Old Black Joe", "Turkey in the Straw" and "O Dem Golden Slippers".

== Military marches ==
Military-style march music enjoyed great popularity, and most towns had brass bands that performed this genre of music. The most popular of the U.S. march composers were John Philip Sousa, Henry Fillmore, and Karl King. Patrick Sarsfield Gilmore was, in many minds, on par with Sousa. Some though more highly of Gilmore than of Sousa. Both men composed works for bands, and for other ensembles.

Military music was not a significant source of entertainment in the U.S. until after the Civil War. After the War ended, many of the bands dispersed and their members surely influenced musical activities in their home towns. During and after the War military band performed in parades, in outdoor concerts, and at encampment (reunions for veterans). The band gazebo was an architectural invention so that bands could perform outdoors with some protection against the weather. The motion picture "The Music Man" is based upon detailed research into the rise of small city bands in the midwest. Prior to military and later community bands, little organized music making was available in small towns due to cost, and many other factors. With the increased demand for wind instruments, east coast U.S. musical instrument manufactures began heavily marketing their wares and the wares of European manufacturers throughout much of the U.S. To assist in marketing their wares (instruments, sheet music, etc.), many regional music houses began publishing music periodicals. Community bands continued until around World War I. By World War II, community bands had suffered significant declines. Cost, changing musical tastes, and the introduction of radio and record players undercut public interest in community bands.

== Eastern European immigrants ==
Starting in the 1880s, Eastern European Jews immigrated to the US in large numbers. They brought with them klezmorim, or musicians who played klezmer music at weddings and other community events. Soon, the United States became the international center for klezmer music, and it became a major influence on jazz and other genres.

Into the 20th century, immigration from Italy, Ireland, Armenia, China, Germany, Finland, and elsewhere was widespread. Most of these immigrant communities kept their folk traditions alive. Some produced musicians of great stature, such as Ukrainian fiddler Pawlo Humeniuk in the 1920s and 1930s. Much later, Armenian oud player Richard Hagopian also became popular at home and abroad. The Slovenian polka master, Frankie Yankovic, has had perhaps more crossover success than these other stars; his period of greatest popularity was in the 1940s.

In addition to peoples immigrating to the United States, many of Europe's finest musicians, singers, and actors, toured heavily in the United States. Jenny Lind, Ole Bull, Enrico Caruso, and Oscar Wilde made highly publicized tours often to great acclaim.

== Composers and conductors ==
During the 19th century, many composers born in the U.S. traveled to Europe for the music education. They then returned to the U.S. and shared their knowledge of the latest European styles. As such, many of these composers wrote in typical styles of the time. Louis Moreau Gottschalk was one such composer who outpaced many of his contemporaries. His associate Charles Kunkel - who often performed duets with Gottschalk while on tour - was a composer in his own right. Theodore Thomas (conductor) was considered to be a leading conductor during the 1880s and 1890s. Thomas too championed works by leading European composers. He also conducted works by leading U.S. composers. Today, the vast majority of 19th century U.S. composers are all but lost to history. This was also the era when women composers and African-American composers started to see their music published in increased numbers.

== Tin Pan Alley ==
In the later decades of the 19th century, the music industry became dominated by a group of publishers and song-writers in New York City that came to be known as Tin Pan Alley. Tin Pan Alley's representatives spread throughout the country, buying local hits for their publishers and pushing their publisher's latest songs. Song demonstrators were fixtures at department stores and music stores across the country, and traveling song demonstrators made circuits of rural areas. The industry was driven by the profits from the sales of sheet music. A piano was considered a must in any middle-class or higher home. Major 19th century Tin Pan Alley hits included "Only a Bird in a Gilded Cage" and "After the Ball Is Over".
