= Music history of the United States to the Civil War =

From the American Revolutionary War to the start of the American Civil War, American music underwent many changes. The folk vernacular traditions diversified and spread across the nation, while a number of prominent composers of European art music also arose.

== Shape note ==
The sacred music of The First New England School of composers quickly spread south, facilitated by the invention of shape notes, a system in which four different note heads corresponded to the four syllables (fa, sol, la and mi) then used in musical instruction. In 1801, William Smith and William Little published The Easy Instructor, a sacred tunebook introducing this system. While the shape-note system itself never took root in New England, The Easy Instructor and similar collections were instrumental in spreading the music of New England composers to the western and southern states, where tunebook compilers added settings of folk and popular melodies (including "folk hymns" and revival choruses) to the popular New England repertory. Popular collections included Ananias Davisson's Kentucky Harmony (Harrisonburg, Virginia, 1817), Allen Carden's Missouri Harmony (Cincinnati, 1820), William Walker's Southern Harmony (1835) and B.F. White and E.J. King's Sacred Harp (1844).

As the popularity of seven-syllable (doremi) solmization increased in the antebellum period, some teachers and publishers experimented with seven-character shape notes as well; the system of Jesse B. Aikin in The Christian Minstrel (Philadelphia, 1846) eventually won out in the years after the Civil War.

== African American music ==
=== Africans in Louisiana ===
In Louisiana, drums remained legal well into the 19th century. There, African slaves, many from the Caribbean islands, danced in large groups, often in circle dances. As of 1817, dancing in New Orleans had been restricted to the area called Congo Square, which was a hotbed of musical fusionism, as African styles from across America and the Caribbean met. Nevertheless, by 1820, opposition from whites in New Orleans and an influx of blacks elsewhere in the U.S. caused the decline of Congo Square's prominence. The tradition of mass dances in Congo Square continued sporadically, though it came to have more in common with minstrelsy than with authentic African traditions.

Caribbean dances known to have been imported to Louisiana include the calinda, congo, counjai and bamboula. The Congo had also been known earlier, mentioned as a social dance in colonial Richmond, Virginia.

=== Spirituals ===
In the 1830s, a Great Awakening of fervent Christianity began, leading to popular spiritual song traditions. During this period, the country was undergoing a religious revival that centered around outdoor worship gatherings (camp meetings), where hymns (camp songs) were sung, as well as itinerant preachers called circuit riders. The period began early in the century, with the first camp meeting occurring in July 1800 in Logan County, Kentucky. This was followed by an 1801 meeting in Cane Ridge, Kentucky which lasted for six days and attracted ten to twenty thousand people. Though originally run by Presbyterian ministers, Methodists and Baptists soon took over. Methodists brought with them hymns, written by John Wesley and his followers, which became very popular. Many songs were semi-improvised, stitched together out of wandering verses that were used in a number of different songs.

The Shakers also played a role in the Great Awakening, and their music, which included both hymns and songs, began diversifying greatly during this period (1837–1848). The most well-known Shaker song, "Simple Gifts", by Joseph Brackett and adapted by Aaron Copland in Appalachian Spring), came from this period. Many of the new Shaker spirituals were called "gift songs", and were revealed to the initiate in a vision by the spirits of Mother Ann, the sect's founder, angels, other historical figures or other races, such as Native Americans. They were not written at first, but eventually the Shakers created their own form of musical notation, and composers like Issachar Bates became renowned. By the end of the 1840s, Shaker meetings were a popular entertainment for non-Shakers.

African-Americans, still mostly enslaved, were not generally allowed to participate, they watched, and were inspired to use African vocal styles and rhythms with the English hymns. These songs were called Negro spirituals. While many were songs praising God or Jesus, others contained coded messages to fellow slaves and rhetoric or symbolically demanding freedom. Spirituals like "Steal Away To Jesus" communicated an impending escape, while "Let my people go" and "Go Down Moses" overtly concerned Biblical Hebrew slaves as a symbol for African slaves.

Musically, spirituals were a descendant of New England choral traditions mixed with African rhythms and call-and-response forms. Shape-note hymns from the First New England School spread south, and were popular there long after New England had moved on. The hymns were simplified to the extreme, until they were nothing more than a tune and some religious lyrics; interacting with African American slave songs, the result was the spiritual tradition.

In addition to the influence of New England choral traditions and shape-note hymns, African American spirituals were deeply rooted in oral tradition and reflected key elements of African musical practices such as polyrhythms, call-and-response patterns, and improvisation. These spirituals were not only expressions of religious faith but also served as tools for communication, resistance, and hope among enslaved communities. Many spirituals carried hidden messages or dual meanings. For instance, "Steal Away To Jesus" and "Swing Low, Sweet Chariot" were outwardly spiritual songs but also signaled plans for escape or a yearning for freedom. Songs like these were shared orally, creating a cohesive cultural identity and fostering solidarity within enslaved communities.

The adaptation of camp meeting hymns by enslaved Africans exemplified the fusion of African and European traditions. Hymns encountered during religious revivals were infused with African musical characteristics, including rhythmic complexity, pentatonic scales, and a communal, participatory style that fostered group cohesion. Call-and-response structures, in which a leader would sing a line and the congregation would respond, were particularly significant. These structures reflected African oral traditions and allowed enslaved individuals to adapt Christian worship to their unique cultural framework. Camp meetings often became spaces where music bridged the gap between African traditions and Christian practices.

Beyond their immediate role in spiritual and emotional sustenance, African American spirituals became an enduring cultural legacy. These songs offered a powerful means of preserving African cultural identity in the face of systemic oppression and displacement. The themes of hope, deliverance, and resilience expressed in spirituals resonated deeply with their creators and audiences, ensuring their longevity. Over time, spirituals became a cornerstone of American music, influencing the development of gospel, blues, jazz, and even modern pop music. Songs such as "Go Down, Moses" and "Wade in the Water" remain culturally and historically significant, continuing to symbolize the enduring strength of African American communities.

== Popularization of slave music ==
In the 1820s, genteel English-styled ballads were popular in urban areas. Many of the songwriters, however, were looking for something new, and were connected with the growing abolitionism movement, which sought to abolish slavery; these included most famously the Hutchinson Family Singers. The 1840s saw increased awareness of African American musical traditions, culminating in the publication of the first collection of African American songs, The Negro Singer's Own Book (1846). Some songwriters, including John Hill Hewitt and Stephen Foster, sought to incorporate what was then called Ethiopian music into their compositions. Songs with simple melodies and delicately incorporated ornamentations like suspensions and appoggiaturas were popular, including "Jeanie with the Light Brown Hair" and "Oh My Darling Clementine". These songs, especially those by Foster, could be considered the beginning of American popular music. It has been called beginning of the "increasing influence of the Afro-American style of song and dance in American life" (Stearns and Stearns, Jazz Dance, quoted in Chase, 232).

=== Blues ===
Following the Civil War, a form of song developed with some distinctive characteristics that may be of ancient origin, perhaps related to the call-and-response format. These songs consisted of three 4-bar phrases. The first two were identical and described a problem, beginning on the implied tonic and subdominant harmonies respectively. The third phrase indicates a reaction to the problem described and begins on the implied dominant harmony. All three phrases cadence on a sustained tonic occupying the third and fourth bar.

=== American songwriters ===
Main articles: Daniel Decatur Emmett and Stephen Foster

Often said to be the first two important composers in American musical history, Emmett and Foster were songwriters, focusing on minstrel songs. They wrote many of the most popular songs of the century, some of which are still remembered today.

Emmett was born in Ohio to a family who immigrated from Virginia. He was uneducated but musically gifted, and eventually wound up in the Virginia Minstrels. He was familiar the music of the southern states, and his songs reflected his awareness of southern culture. These included "Old Dan Tucker" and "De Boatman's Dance". Emmett's "Johnny Roach" includes the first use of the word Dixie to describe the south (Chase, 240). That song is one of several from the period written from the point of view of an escaped slave who pines for the plantation he has escaped from. Emmett wrote this song after joining Bryant's Minstrels in 1858, when tensions across the country were high, and controversy raged surrounding slavery, state's rights and the enforcement of the Fugitive Slave Act.

Emmett's use of Dixie was as a personal name, given to a black postboy, and may have been used as to indicate that the character, played by a white actor, was in fact black. Emmett's later song "I Wish I Was in Dixie's Land", later popularized simply as "Dixie", was the beginning of the term's use to refer to the south. The song was an instant success, and soon became embroiled in a copyright dispute between several publishers. The song was so popular it was even played at the inauguration of Jefferson Davis, and was re-claimed as a patriotic northern song by Abraham Lincoln at the end of the war.

Stephen Foster wrote numerous songs that remain well-known today, including "Camptown Races", "Oh! Susanna", "Old Folks at Home" and "Ching a Ring Chaw". The last, technically titled "Sambo's Address to He' Bred'rin", urges its audience to emigrate to "Hettee" (Haiti, perceived as a "Negro Republic" in the Western Hemisphere).

Foster was born in 1826 to a farming family in Lawrenceville, Pennsylvania, near Pittsburgh. He played the piano as a youth and learned the rules of the "genteel", or upper-class traditions, though he was also fascinated by comin blackface songs. His first published composition was 1844's "Open Thy Lattice, Love", which was based on words by George Pope Morris and had previously been adapted for music by Joseph Philip Knight. In addition to the renowned blackface songs, Foster also wrote such parlor songs as "What Must a Fairy's Dream Be?" and "Molly! Do You Love Me?".

=== Banjo ===
The banjo entered the American national consciousness in the middle of the 19th century. Though originally only four-stringed, a five-stringed banjo was standard by the 1840s; this change is often credited to Virginia's only major blackface performer, Joel Walker Sweeney. The instrument is widely used in many kinds of African American folk music, though it was originally developed in Arabia, and is likely descended from one or more African or Asian instruments. It is now a major element of popular music, especially country and bluegrass.

== Brass bands ==
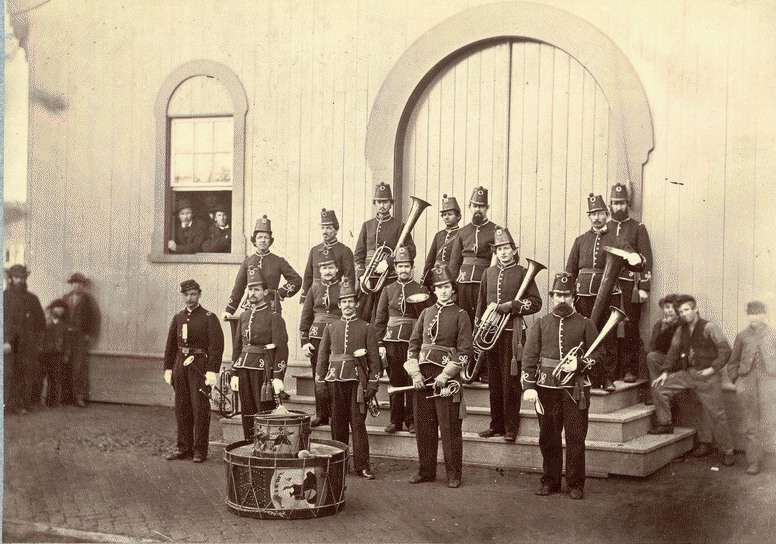
Band of the 10th Veteran Reserve Corps, Washington, D.C. April, 1865

The early 1850s saw a growth in the development of brass band music. Brass bands were made up of brass and woodwinds, especially the E-flat cornet and soprano saxhorn. Many of these bands were associated with an Army regiment, while others were associated with the workers at a particular factory. Employers urging their employees to form bands were common in the United Kingdom at the time, and the practice spread through immigration to the US. These factory bands' concerts were probably rowdy affairs, with musicians and listeners dancing wildly with no spatial split between them. British bands were all amateurs, but America produced many professional ensembles as well.

John C. Linehan described the spirit of American brass bands, and specifically the Fisherville Cornet Band, formed immediately before the Civil War:

(The band's) engagement by the Horse Guards, although a matter of pride, was nevertheless an occasion of dismay, for the boys for the first time in their lives had to play on horseback. As nearly all of them were novices in this direction the outlook was serious, for it is a question if there were half a dozen of the number that had ever straddled a horse. When the proposition was first broached in the band room, one of the saddest looking men was the leader, Loren Currier. He said he would vote to accept on one condition, and that was if a horse could be secured large enough to have them all ride together and give him a place in the middle. The proposition was, however, accepted. . . . It was a moving sight (the moving was all towards the ground, however), and the bucking broncos of the Wild West Show furnished no more sport, while it lasted, than did the gallant equestrians of the Fisherville Band while trying to train their horses to march and wheel by fours.

Besides the English tradition, German, Italian and Irish immigrants also had a major impact on the American brass band tradition. Forty-two professional German musicians, for example, formed the Seventh Regiment Band, one of the most famous brass bands during the 1850s and the only exclusively regimental band of the period; the bandleader, who went by the name Noll, used brass and reed instruments in duo proportion. German bandleader Friendrich Wilhelm Wieprecht was also influential, collecting full scores for his compilation of instrumentations of popular works, für die jetzige Stimmenbesetzung. Instruments included the bassoon, contrabassoon, bass tuba, trumpet, trombone, clarinet, piccolo, oboe, French horn, saxhorn, drums and cymbals. Wieprecht was recognized at the time as a key figure in the reorganization of the Prussian military bands in meticulous, regimented detail and strict rules of conduct, rehearsal and musicianship. The Italian influence on American brass bands is perhaps best demonstrated by Francis Scala, a Naples-born immigrant who led the U.S. Marine Band. He was a clarinetist who always placed his instrument prominently in his band, and is largely responsible for popularizing the instrument in brass bands. Irish bandleader Patrick Sarsfield Gilmore was also influential, having introduced a wide range of reed instruments as well as developing instrumentation that allowed a large wind ensemble to approximate the effects of a full orchestra.

With the coming of the Civil War, the popularity of brass bands continued to grow. Promises of a famous band being attached to a regiment were used to induce recruitment, and the brass band tradition flourished. Following the war, huge peace jubilee concerts were held, where thousands of performers sometimes played.

== Music of other immigrant communities ==
=== Creole and Cajun music ===
The city of New Orleans has long been a center for cultural innovation, and the pre-eminent city of the Gulf Coast. It is fitting, then, that the first major American classical composer was from New Orleans -- Louis Moreau Gottschalk. Gottschalk achieved fame in Europe, the first American composer to do so, and is well-remembered for his fusion of themes from ethnic folk dances in Louisiana into his piano compositions.

With French-Canadians from Acadia, white settlers of Scots-Irish, French and Spanish descent, Native Americans and an abundance of slaves from the West Indies, New Orleans and the surrounding area was a cultural melting pot.

=== Mexican-Texans ===
Texas was part of Mexico until the mid-19th century, after the Mexican–American War, and its Mexican-American inhabitants played a mixture of ranchera, bolero and polka music called conjunto. To some extent an American version of accordion-led Mexican música norteña, conjunto was popular throughout Mexican communities in Texas.

== Sound samples ==
Bice'waan Song is a recording from the Library of Congress, collected by Alice Cunningham Fletcher and Francis La Flesche and published in 1897. The singer is George Miller, who was probably born in about 1852. It was described as: "The true love-song, called by the Omaha Bethae waan, an old designation and not a descriptive name, is sung generally in the early morning, when the lover is keeping his tryst and watching for the maiden to emerge from the tent and go to the spring. They belong to the secret courtship and are sometimes called Me-the-g'thun wa-an—courting songs. ... They were sung without drum, bell or rattle, to accent the rhythm, in which these songs is subordinated to tonality and is felt only in the musical phrases. ... Vibrations for the purpose of giving greater expression were not only affected by the tremolo of the voice, but they were enhanced by waving the hand, or a spray of artemesia before the lips, while the body often swayed gently to the rhythm of the song (Fletcher, 1894, p. 156)."
