= Music history of the United States (1900–1940) =

Music in the United States underwent many developments from 1900 to 1940, as new genres developed. The country survived both World War I and the Great Depression before entering World War II in December 1941. Americans endured great loss and hardship but found hope and encouragement in music. The genres and styles present during this period were Native American music, Blues and gospel, jazz, swing, Cajun and Creole music, and country. The United States also took inspiration from other cultures and parts of the world for her own music. The music of each region differed as much as the people did. The time also produced many notable singers and musicians, including jazz figure Louis Armstrong, blues and jazz singer Mamie Smith, and country singer Jimmie Rodgers.

== Native Americans ==
Modern Native American pow wows arose around the turn of the 20th century. While some claim that pow wow had been an integral part of indigenous cultures for over 10 centuries, some modern analysts believe that pow wows were invented to appeal to tourists and had only a tangential relationship to genuine Native American traditions, which generally revolved around ceremonial dance music like the Ghost Dance, Zuni Shalako, Navajo Yeibichai and the Sun Dance of the Plains. The Native American Church, founded early in the 20th century, was a center of development for Native American gospel and Peyote song, a fusion of gospel and traditional music revolving around ceremonies in which hallucinogenic peyote is taken as a sacrament. In Arizona and Mexico, waila, or chicken scratch, music, had arisen as a fusion of native Tohono O'odham music with German polka and Mexican-American norteño.

Jazz, blues, folk, country, and gospel, music from the Caribbean region also briefly became popular during the first half of the twentieth century. Trinidadian calypso, Argentinian tango and Dominican merengue and other styles influenced American popular music. Hawaiian music (especially slack-key guitar) enjoyed an early vogue in the 1910s, influencing the developing genre of country music (this is the source of the steel guitar sound that is characteristic of modern country).

Eastern European Jews contributed klezmer music to American culture, with the earliest stars including Harry Kandel, Naftule Brandwein, Dave Tarras and Abe Schwartz. Kandel, a clarinetist, set the stage for American klezmer.

== Blues and gospel ==
The blues began in rural communities, primarily in the south, as a mixture of "work songs, spiritual music and gospel, which combined to create a narrative, call-and-response form adopted by later musical genres." During the 1920s, classic female blues singers like Mamie Smith ("Crazy Blues") dominated the genre's sound. For most white Americans, these female singers were their first exposure to black music, or "race music" as it was then known. In the 1930s, local blues styles developed in Memphis, New Orleans, the mid-Atlantic coast, Texas, Kansas City and, most importantly, Chicago. A style of piano-playing based on the blues, boogie-woogie was briefly popular among mainstream audiences and blues listeners.

At the heights of the Great Depression, gospel music started to become popular by people like Thomas A. Dorsey and Mahalia Jackson, who adapted Christian hymns to blues and jazz structures. By 1925, three main styles of gospel had become popular among mainstream audiences. Itinerant jack leg preachers like Blind Willie Johnson and Washington Phillips released recordings that are now collector's items but were then only marginally popular. Jubilee quartets like the Norfolk Jubilee Quartet and the Golden Gate Quartet were popular and sophisticated, but the most successful form of gospel was singing preachers like Reverend J. M. Gates, who passionately sung about the terrible consequences of disobeying God's laws.

== Jazz ==
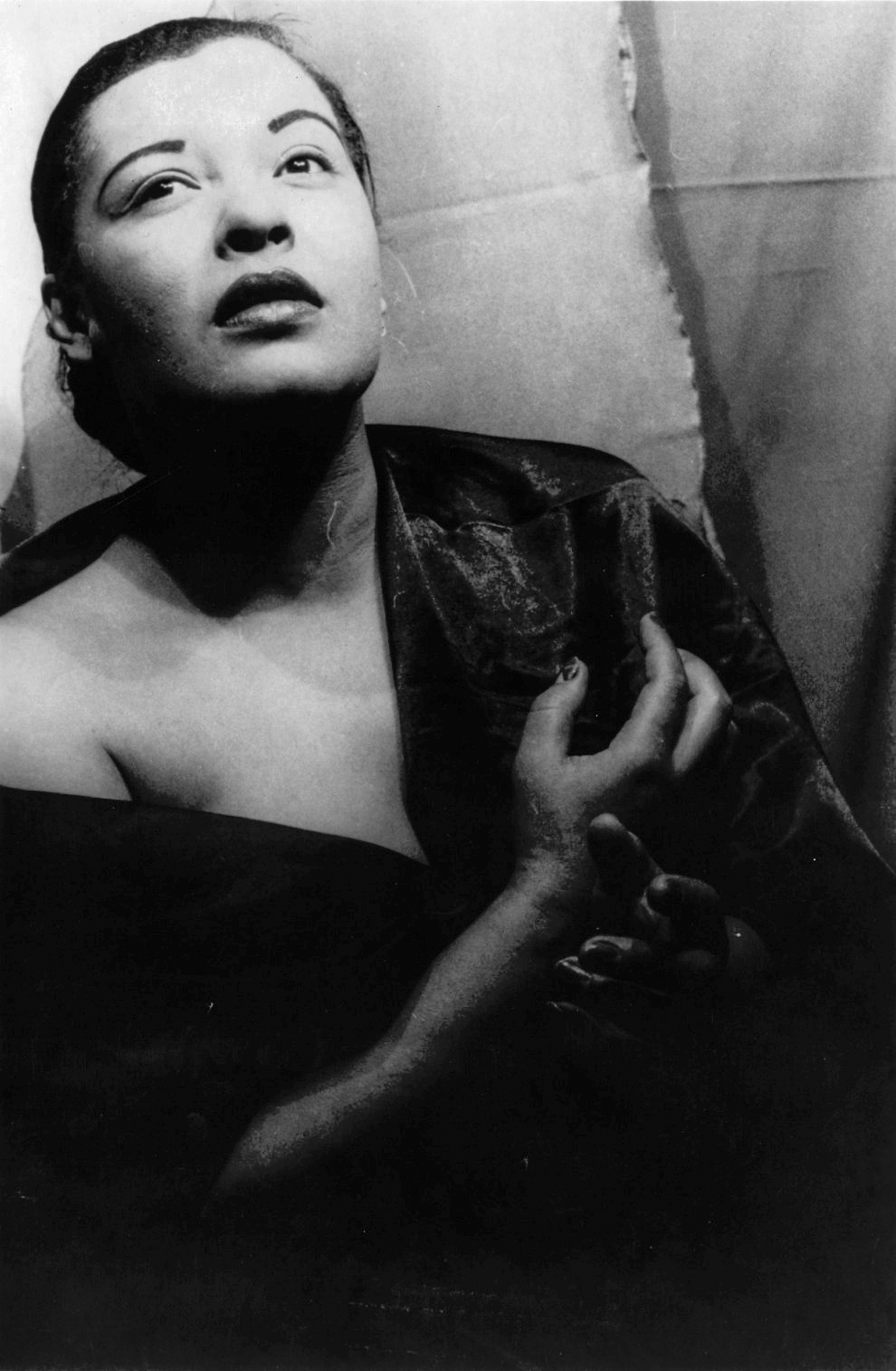
Billie Holiday

Jazz was more urban than the blues. Relying more on instrumentation, the sound was well-suited for listeners unfamiliar with the genre's conventions. It drew primarily on New Orleans blues, but also incorporated influences from Jewish-American musicians and composers like Benny Goodman and George Gershwin. In the 1920s, jazz bars became popular among white Americans, particularly young ones. As with ragtime before, and most major genres since, jazz was blamed for the moral degeneracy of the youth that visited these bars and listened to the music. In spite of the controversy, jazz emerged as the dominant sound of the country in the late 1920s in popularized forms that some called watered down, like swing music and big band. Though these, like jazz proper, were blamed for crime and delinquency, they had become mainstream by the 1930s. In the 1940s, pure jazz began to become more popular, along with the blues, with artists like Ella Fitzgerald ("A-Tisket, A-Tasket") and Billie Holiday ("Strange Fruit") becoming nationally successful.

New Orleans jazz was and remains the most influential form of roots jazz. The major underpinnings of the style were in place by 1900 or a bit before, when New Orleans, Louisiana produced musicians like Buddy Bolden, Jelly Roll Morton and Kid Ory. The most distinctive characteristic of New Orleans jazz is the influence of the marching brass bands. The first recordings of the genre were by the Original Dixieland Jass Band from 1917. The 1920s saw trumpet and cornet leaders like Louis Armstrong and Joe "King" Oliver, playing with the trumpet proclaiming the melody and harmonies and countermelodies coming from the clarinet or trombone. The rhythm section typically included a tuba or bass, piano, banjo or drums. During this period, ensembles were standard, in contrast to many of the later developments in jazz. By the 1930s, however, newer forms of pop-jazz like swing music and Dixieland had overtaken authentic New Orleans-style jazz among mainstream audiences.

Dixieland jazz is a form of jazz which arose in the 1920s in Chicago. Musicians there were trying to revive authentic, classic New Orleans jazz. By the 1940s, Dixieland revival musicians like Jimmy McPartland, Eddie Condon and Bud Freeman had become well-known and established their own unique style. Most characteristically, players entered solos against riffing by other horns, and were followed by a closing with the drummer playing a four-bar tag that was then answered by the rest of the band.

In 1917, the Original Dixieland Jazz Band released "Livery Stable Blues", which is often said to be the first jazz recording. The genre had certainly existed before 1917, however, but recording opportunities were bleak. Buddy Bolden, a cornetist from New Orleans, never recorded his influential take on jazz. The early 1920s saw recordings from Kid Ory, King Oliver, Sidney Bechet, Jelly Roll Morton and Bessie Smith. King Oliver included a young cornetist named Louis Armstrong on his records as the second cornet. Armstrong soon moved to Chicago, worked with Fletcher Henderson, Bessie Smith and Clarence Williams and eventually began working as a band leader in 1925, his work setting the stage for the development of swing and the jazz variations to come after. Jazz had just reached its first peak of mainstream popularity in 1924, with the recordings of Paul Whiteman.

Alongside the Great Depression, many musicians from poor, rural Southern states like Louisiana moved to the north, especially New York City and Chicago, Louis Armstrong was among them, and he helped make Chicago the center for musical innovation in the country before moving on to New York, where clubs like Cotton Club, Village Vanguard and Minton's were flourishing.

The mid-1930s were the peak of big band swing, with artists like Charlie Barnet, Chick Webb and Benny Goodman rising to the ranks of esteemed-band leaders. Soloists appeared during this period, inspiring hysterical reactions among fans.

== Swing ==
Swing music was a pop-oriented form of jazz, the origins of which can be found as far back as 1923, when Fletcher Henderson began enlarging jazz bands. Whole new sections were added, and Henderson created music of greater range and texture. The same period saw Duke Ellington similarly expanding his relatively small jazz bands, and both groups had laid down recordings as early as 1931. Jead Goldkette and Ben Pollack were also early influential African American swing musicians, and were followed by yet more dance-oriented swing bands led by Jimmie Lunceford, Earl Hines, Don Redman, Count Basie, Glen Gray, Dorsey Brothers, Bob Crosby, Luis Russell, Andy Kirk, Glenn Miller, and Benny Carter. The period 1935 onwards (until 1945) was posthumously referred to as the 'swing era'.

== Cajun and Creole music ==
Modern Cajun music began developing in the 1920s, drawing on traditional fiddlers and more modern accordionists. Joe and Cléoma Falcon made the first recording, "Allons à Lafayette", in 1928. The song was a regional hit that paved the way for Cleoma's brother, Amédée Breaux's "Jolie Blonde", now often considered the Cajun national anthem. Amédé Ardoin, a black man, soon became the most popular Cajun star, however. Louisiana's Creole population, made up of mixed African, French and Anglo heritage, had developed a form of dance music known as la la. Canray Fontenot was perhaps the most influential la la performer.

In the 1930s, oil was discovered in Louisiana and Anglos came to the state en masse. Cajun culture was denigrated and restricted, and old-time music and western swing became major influences on Cajun music. Luderin Darbone's The Hackleberry Ramblers and Harry Choates were the vanguard of this new wave of Cajun music, which incorporated English lyrics and a smooth style. By the 1940s, though a revival of traditional Cajun music had begun, led by Iry LeJeune, whose 1948 "La valse du pont d'amour" is considered a watershed in the field.

== Country music ==
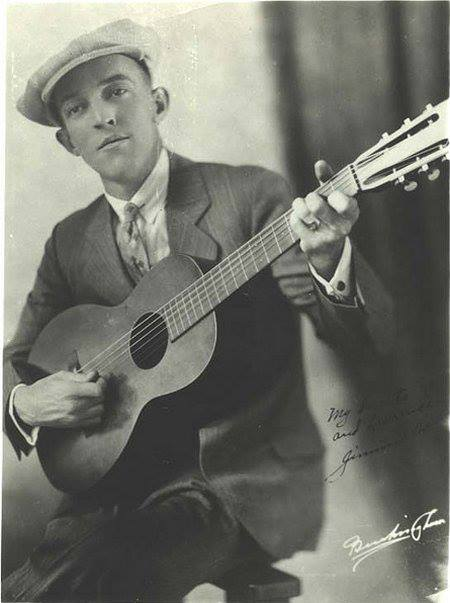
Jimmie Rodgers in 1921

Country music evolved along somewhat the same lines as folk, but achieved much more mainstream success. Jug bands and other influences (including Hawaiian steel guitar, folk and the country blues) coalesced in the 1930s development of honky tonk, a rough form of country music.

At the beginning of the century, rural whites from Appalachia were known as hillbillies, and their music soon came to be called hillbilly music. Protestant churches like the Old Regular Baptists and Holiness Pentecostal used music in their services, and this was one of the biggest influences on hillbilly music.

Hillbilly music was not widely recorded until the 1920s. Bristol, a city on the Virginia and Tennessee border, was the site of a two-week recording session in 1927 that led to the discovery of the two biggest names in hillbilly music: The Carters and Jimmie Rodgers. The Carters were a trio playing Auto-harp and Guitar, with clear, strong vocals and harmonies, while Rodgers sang a more worldly, blues-influenced music that has been called country blues. Rodgers sold millions of records in the 1930s During this period, hillbilly music became big business, and musicians began endorsing products as well as adding new instruments, like fiddles, banjos, mandolins and Hawaiian steel guitar. Some other important musicians of this era include Gid Tanner & the Skillet Lickers and Charlie Poole & the North Carolina Ramblers.

By the 1940s, brother duets, in which two brothers sang harmony with precision and clarity, had become popular and was known as close harmony. The Blue Sky Boys, Del-more Brothers, Monroe Brothers and, especially, the Louvin Brothers, were the most popular brother duet pairs.
