= Music history of the United States in the 1970s =

Popular music of the United States in the 1970s saw various forms of pop music dominating the charts. Often characterized as being shallow, 1970s pop took many forms and could be seen as a reaction against the high-energy and activist pop of the previous decade. It began with singer-songwriters like Carole King and Carly Simon topping the charts, while New York City saw a period of great innovation; hip hop, punk rock and salsa were invented in 1970s New York, which was also a center for electronic music, techno.

By the middle of the decade, various trends were vying for popular success. Sly & the Family Stone's pop-funk had spawned singers like Roberta Flack and Donny Hathaway, alongside George Clinton's spacy P Funk extravaganzas, Lynyrd Skynyrd and the Allman Brothers Band led a wave of country rock bands. Pop progressive-hard rock bands like Boston, Kansas, Journey, and Styx had long-running popularity. Bruce Springsteen garnered critical acclaim during much of the decade, finally breaking through in a big way very late in the 1970s. Disco, especially The Bee Gees and Donna Summer, were dominating the charts the last few years of the decade, while punk rock and other genres were developing underground.

== Rock ==
=== Hard rock, arena rock and heavy metal ===
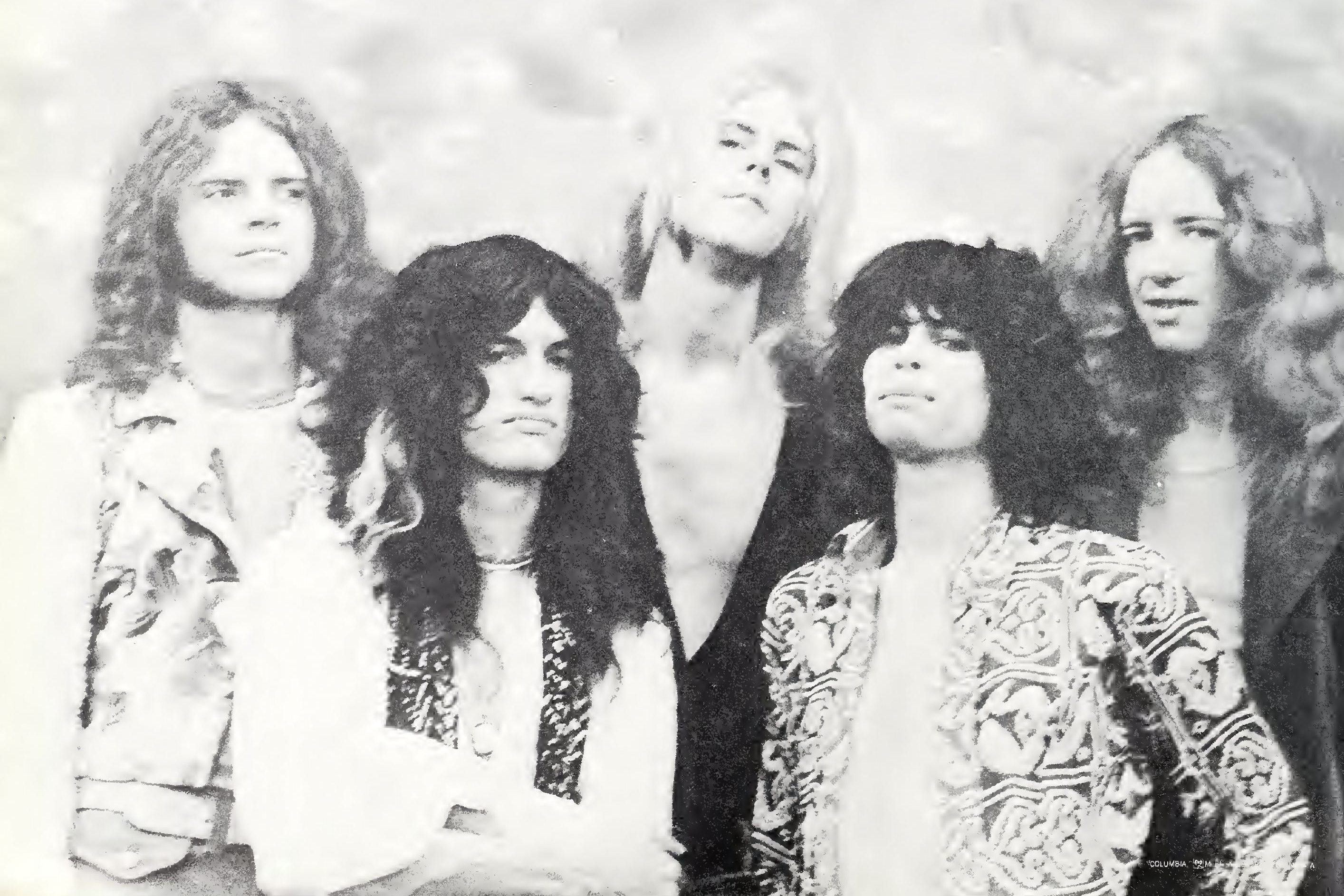
Aerosmith

The 1970s saw the emergence of hard rock as one of the most prominent subgenres of rock music. Bands like Alice Cooper and Deep Purple were highly popular by 1972. The guitar sounds became heavier and the riffs faster. By the second half of the decade, several bands had achieved star status, namely, Lynyrd Skynyrd, Aerosmith and Kiss. Arena rock grew in popularity through progressive bands like Styx ("Come Sail Away"), and hard rock bands like Boston ("More Than a Feeling").

Heavy metal music (though not recognized as a separate genre from hard rock at the time) gained a cult following in the 1970s, led by Led Zeppelin, Black Sabbath and Deep Purple, with their styles later influencing other bands like Judas Priest and Motörhead, which eventually started the New Wave of British Heavy Metal in the 1980s.

Psychedelic rock declined in popularity after the deaths of Jimi Hendrix and Jim Morrison and the breakup of The Beatles.

=== Soft rock and singer-songwriter ===
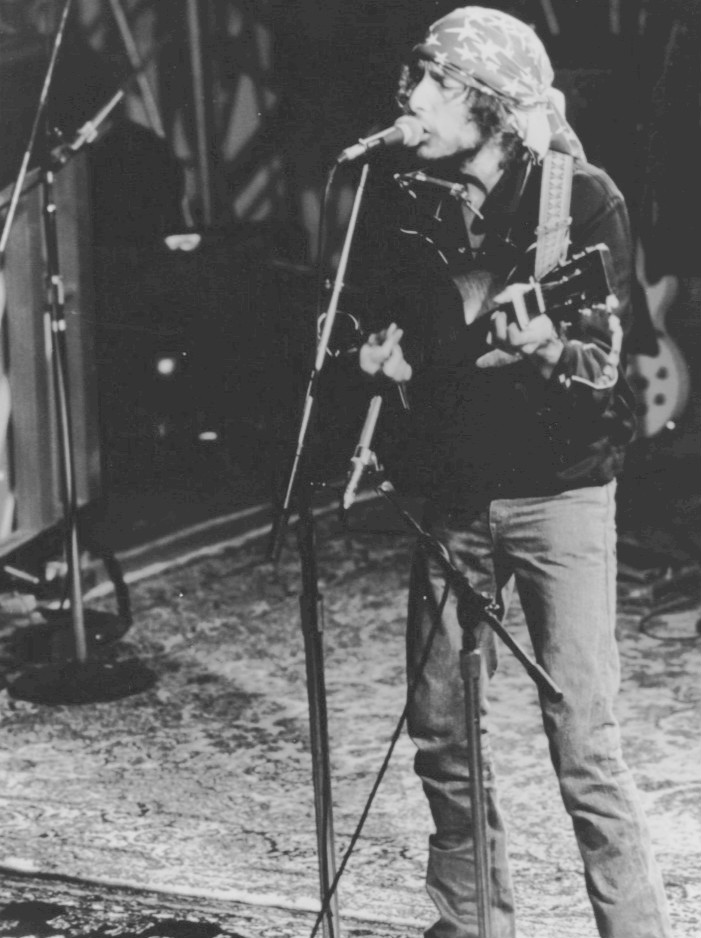
Bob Dylan performing in Hard Rain--the first television special he starred in, 1976.

Soft rock was prominently featured on many Top 40 and contemporary hit radio stations throughout the 1970s. Soft rock often used acoustic instruments and placed emphasis on melody and harmonies. Major soft rock artists of the 1970s included Carole King, James Taylor, Billy Joel, Chicago, America and Fleetwood Mac, whose Rumours (1977) was the best selling album of the decade. (See the country music section of this article for more about country music that crossed over onto the pop charts.) Bob Dylan's 1975–1976 Rolling Thunder Revue reunited him with a number of folk-rock acts from his early days of performing, most notably Joan Baez.

A large number of country-pop and soft rock songs fit into the singer-songwriter classification – that is, songs written and recorded by the same person. Some of the most successful singer-songwriter artists were Jackson Browne, Eric Carmen, Jim Croce, John Denver, Steve Goodman, Arlo Guthrie, Joel, Dave Mason, Don McLean, Joni Mitchell, Paul Simon, Taylor and Neil Young. Some artists – including King, Kris Kristofferson and Gordon Lightfoot — had previously been primarily songwriters but began releasing albums and songs of their own. King's album Tapestry became one of the top-selling albums of the decade, and the song "It's Too Late" became one of the 1970s biggest songs. McLean's 1971 song "American Pie," inspired by the death of Buddy Holly, became one of popular music's most-recognized songs of the 20th century, thanks to its abstract and vivid storytelling, which center around "The Day the Music Died" and popular music of the rock era.

The early 1970s marked the departure of Diana Ross from The Supremes and the breakup of Simon & Garfunkel. Ross, Simon and Art Garfunkel all continued hugely successful recording careers throughout the decade and beyond. Several of their songs are listed among the biggest hits of the 1970s: Simon & Garfunkel's "Bridge Over Troubled Water," Simon's solo hit "50 Ways to Leave Your Lover," and Ross' "Ain't No Mountain High Enough."

=== Country rock and Southern rock ===
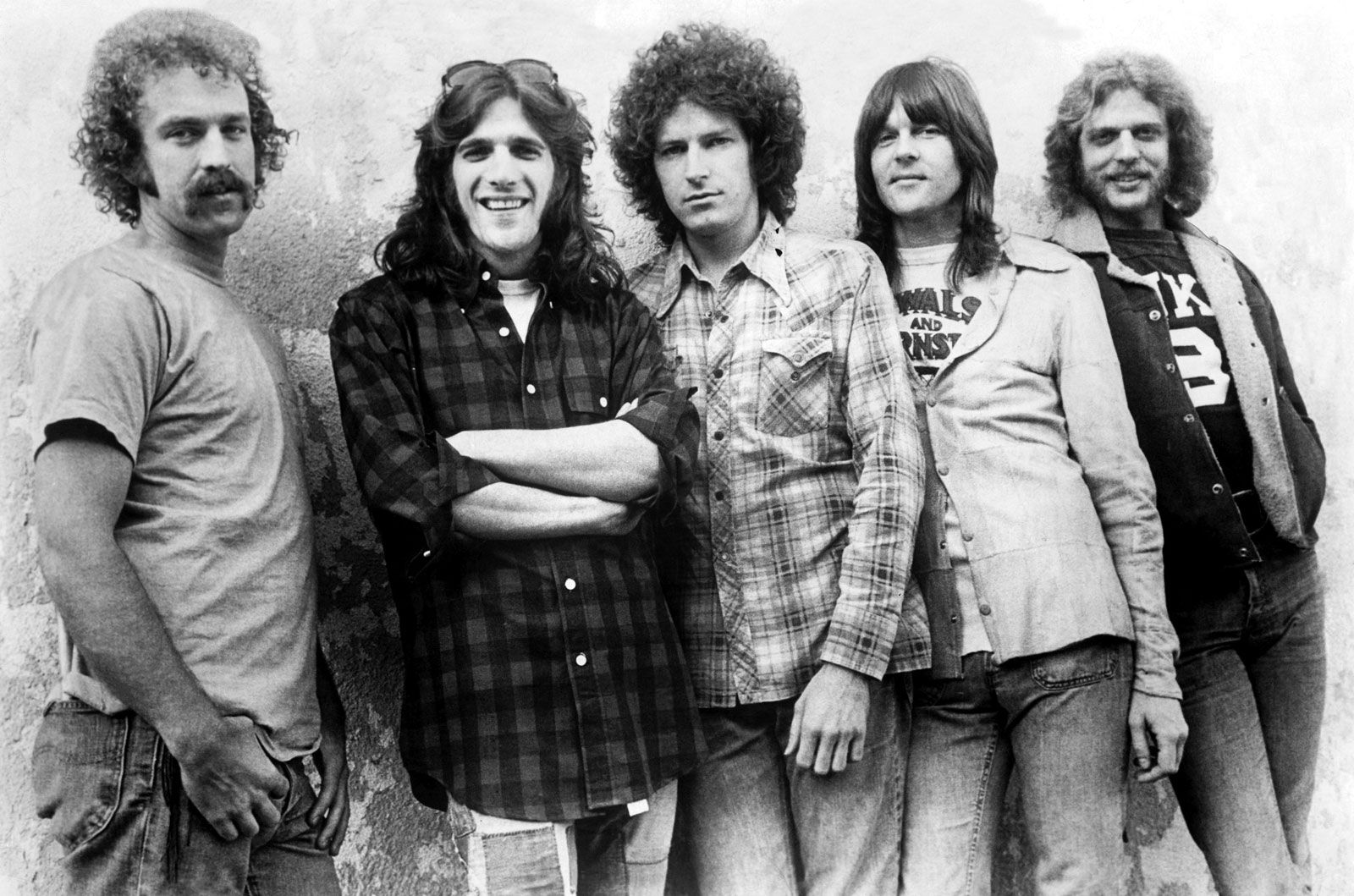
The Eagles

Country rock, formed from the fusion of rock music with country music, gained its greatest commercial success in the 1970s, beginning with non-country artists such as Bob Dylan, Gram Parsons and The Byrds. By the mid-1970s, Linda Ronstadt, along with other newer artists such as Emmylou Harris and The Eagles, were enjoying mainstream success and popularity that continues to this day. The Eagles themselves emerged as one of the most successful rock acts of all time, producing albums that included Hotel California (1976).

During the 1970s, a similar style of country rock called Southern rock (fusing rock, country and blues music, and focusing on electric guitars and vocals) was enjoying popularity with country audiences, thanks to such non-country acts as Lynyrd Skynyrd, The Allman Brothers Band, Atlanta Rhythm Section and The Marshall Tucker Band. These bands incorporated elements of country music into rock-oriented recordings, contributing to the crossover between the two genres during the decade.

=== Progressive rock ===
Styx

The American brand of prog rock varied from the eclectic and innovative Frank Zappa, Captain Beefheart and Pavlov's Dog to more pop arena rock bands like Boston, Kansas, Journey, Toto and Styx. These, beside British bands Jethro Tull, Supertramp and Electric Light Orchestra, all demonstrated a prog rock influence and while ranking among the most commercially successful acts of the 1970s, issuing in the era of pomp or arena rock, which would last until the costs of complex shows (often with theatrical staging and special effects), would be replaced by more economical rock festivals as major live venues in the 1990s.

=== New Wave ===
Many American bands in the late seventies began experimenting with synthesizers, forming the new wave style. The original American bands included Talking Heads, The Cars, and Devo. In the eighties, Britain would respond with the synthpop style, which broadened the definition of "new wave".

=== Power pop ===
Combining elements of punk rock and pop music, bands such as The Romantics, The Knack, and Cheap Trick created the "power pop" sound. Also seeing mild success is Loverboy.

=== Blues rock ===
Blues rock remains popular, with Johnny Winter, ZZ Top, George Thorogood, and in the UK, Eric Clapton, seeing the greatest success.

== Disco ==
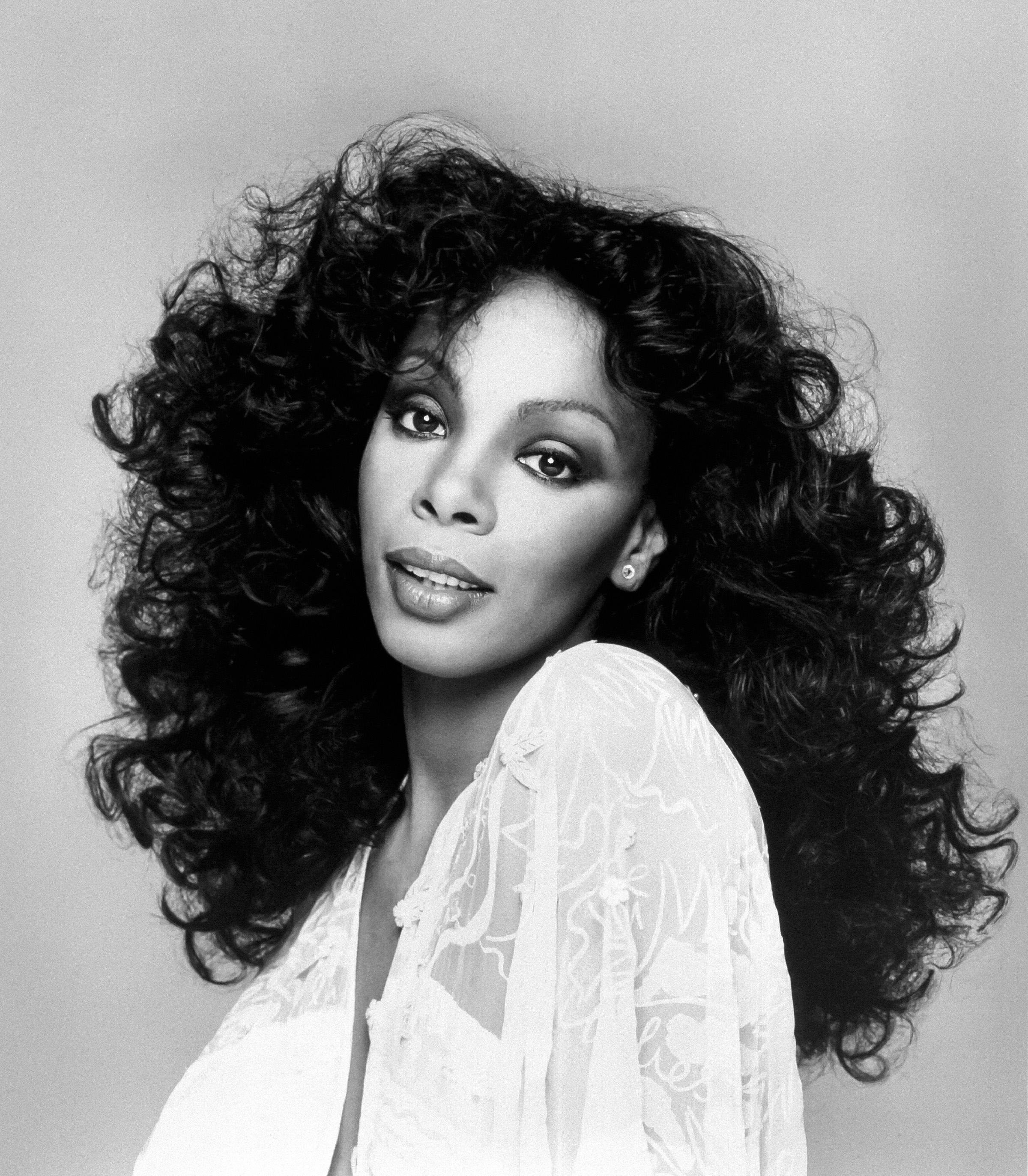
Donna Summer

For many people, disco is the genre of music most readily associated with the 1970s. First appearing in dance clubs by the middle of the decade, (with such hits as "The Hustle" by Van McCoy), artists like Donna Summer, Gloria Gaynor popularized the genre and were described in subsequent decades as the "disco divas." The movie Saturday Night Fever was released in December 1977, starring John Travolta and featuring the music of the Bee Gees and several other artists. It had the effect of setting off disco mania in the United States. the Bee Gees' soundtrack to Saturday Night Fever became the one best selling album of all time. The Bee Gees and Donna Summer became the genres mega stars. The Bee Gees had 9 number 1 singles, and 12 top 10 hits on the Billboard Hot 100 Chart. Donna Summer had 4 number 1 singles, and 8 top 5 hits, 9 top 10s during the second half of the decade. Summer would be the first female artist of the modern era, to have the number one single and number album, simultaneously on the pop charts. She would accomplish this 3 times in 8 months. She was the first female artist to have 3 number one singles, and 5 top 10, and or; 5 top 5 singles in a calendar year (1979). The other prominent acts of the genre were KC and the Sunshine Band who scored 4 number one singles, The Village People, and Chic. KC and the Sunshine Band would enter the first week of the new decade (1980s) with their fifth number one single, and Donna Summer would enter the new decade with her third number one double album.

The genre started to become increasingly commercialized, and the large number of disco songs flooding the radio airwaves in 1978–1979 resulted in a growing backlash against it, as epitomized by the "Disco Demolition Night" stunt by a Chicago disc jockey at a July 1979 baseball game at Comiskey Park. The popularity of the genre waned, and 1980s, declared dead by the rock deejays of the nation, "Funkytown" by Lipps Inc. was one of the last disco hits. Along with the demise of disco came the end of the orchestrations and musical instruments (such as strings) which had become associated with disco, in part because of the high cost of producing such music. Electronic and synthesized music quickly replaced the lush orchestral sounds of the 1970s and rock music resurged in popularity with new wave bands such as Blondie ("Heart of Glass"), The Knack ("My Sharona") and Devo ("Whip It"), all who formed their bands in the 1970s. Many artists such as The Bee Gees, who came to be associated with disco, found it difficult to get airplay on the radio.

== R&B and urban ==
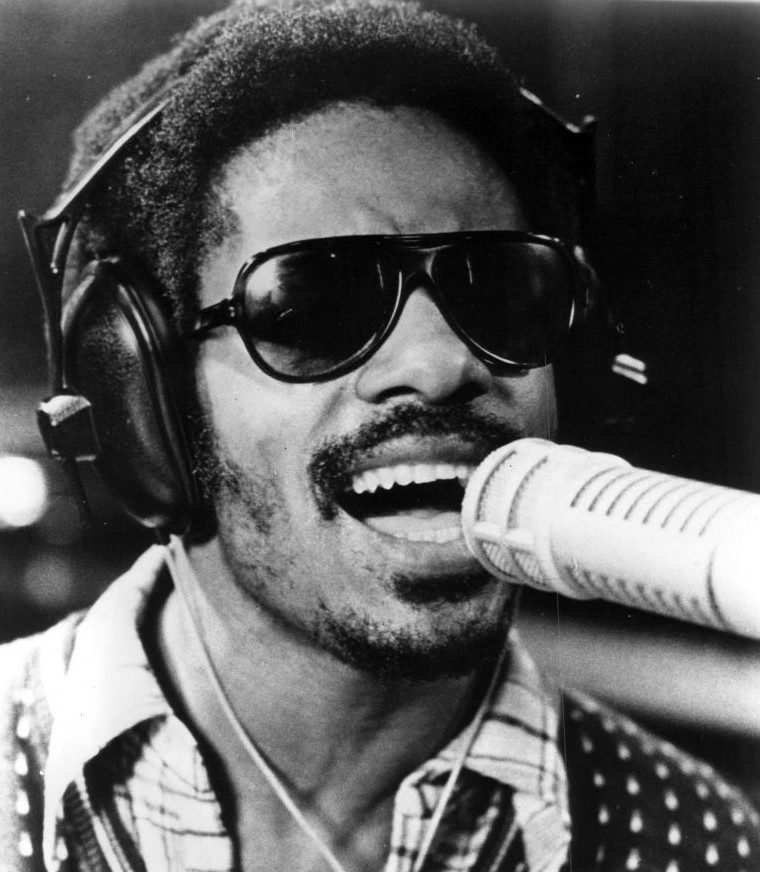
Stevie Wonder became one of the most popular R&B artists during the 1970s.

Along with disco, funk was one of the most popular genres of music in the 1970s. Primarily an African-American genre, it was characterized by the heavy use of bass and "wah-wah" pedals. Rhythm was emphasized over melody. Artists such as James Brown, The Meters, Parliament-Funkadelic and Sly and the Family Stone pioneered the genre. It then spawned artists such as Stevie Wonder, The Brothers Johnson, Earth, Wind & Fire, Bootsy's Rubber Band, King Floyd, Tower of Power, Ohio Players, The Commodores, War, Kool & the Gang, Confunkshun, Slave, Cameo, the Bar-Kays, Zapp, and many more.

The Jackson 5 became one of the biggest pop-music phenomena of the 1970s, playing from a repertoire of rhythm and blues, soul, pop and later disco. The Jacksons include Jermaine and Michael, the first act in recording history to have their first four major label singles: "I Want You Back", "ABC", "The Love You Save", and "I'll Be There" reach the top of the Billboard Hot 100. The band served as the launching pad for the solo careers of their lead singers Jermaine and Michael, and while Jermaine had some success, it was Michael who would transform his early fame into greater success as an adult artist, with songs such as "Don't Stop 'Til You Get Enough" and "Rock with You."

First album of The Commodores were funk song only, but later, they played pop songs. Lionel Richie changed his sound and got success as a solo singer. His group's era he had big hits, including "Easy," "Three Times a Lady" and "Still."

== Pop ==
Some of the notable pop groups during the 1970s were the Carpenters, the Jackson 5, Chicago, ABBA, the Bee Gees, Electric Light Orchestra, the Eagles and Fleetwood Mac.

Male soloists who characterized the pop music of the era included Barry Manilow, Paul McCartney, Elton John, Neil Diamond, Stevie Wonder and Rod Stewart. Female soloists who epitomized the 1970s included Roberta Flack, Carly Simon, Donna Summer, Barbra Streisand, Linda Ronstadt, Olivia Newton-John, Diana Ross, and Helen Reddy.

== Country ==
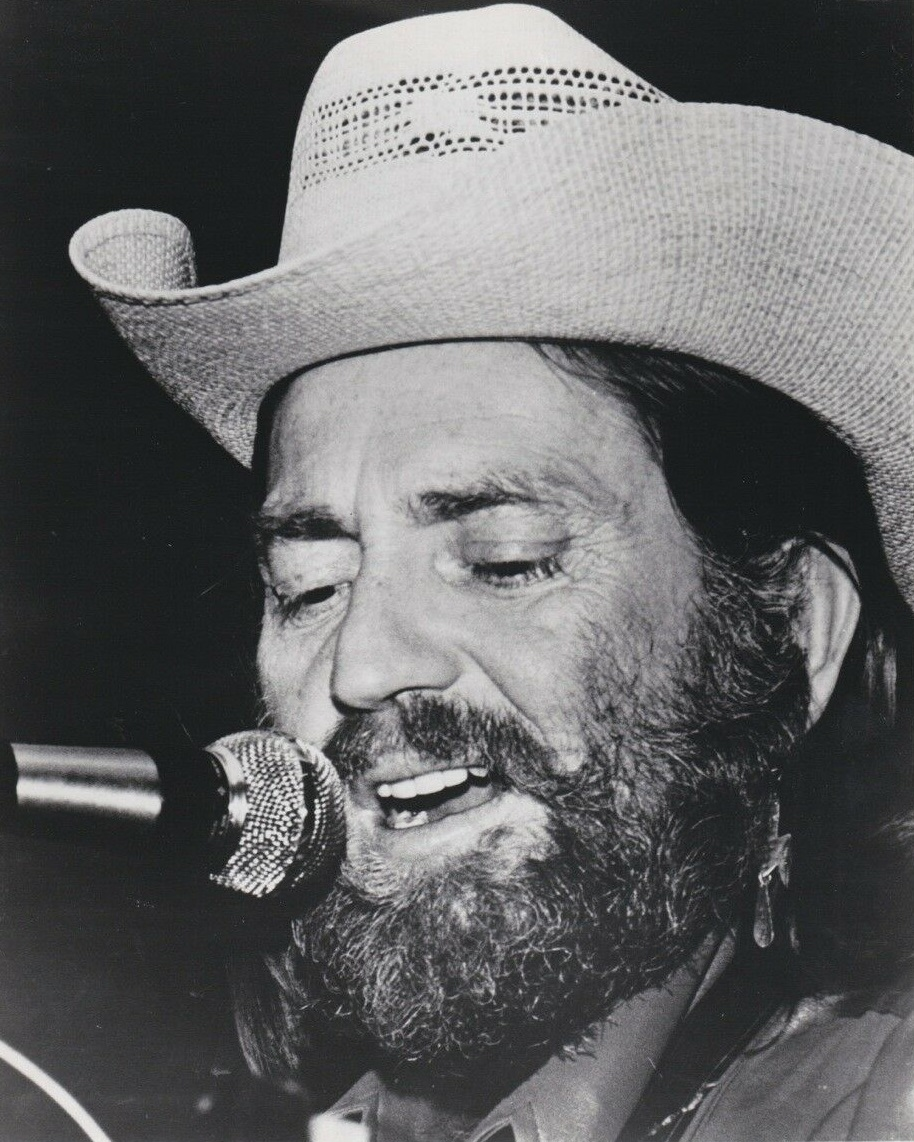
Willie Nelson became one of the most popular country music artists during the 1970s.

A number of styles defined country music during the 1970s decade. At the beginning of the decade, the countrypolitan — an offshoot of the earlier "Nashville Sound" of the late 1950s and early 1960s – and the honky-tonk fused Bakersfield Sound were some of the more popular styles.

The countrypolitan sound – a polished, streamlined sound featuring string sections, background vocals and crooning lead vocalists – was popularized by artists including Lynn Anderson, Glen Campbell, Anne Murray, Dottie West, Tammy Wynette and others, achieving their successes through such songs as "(I Never Promised You a) Rose Garden", "Snowbird" and others. The Bakersfield sound, first popularized in the early 1960s, continued its peak in popularity through artists such as Buck Owens and Merle Haggard.

But other styles began to emerge during the 1970s. One of the more successful styles was "outlaw country", a type of music blending the traditional and honky tonk sounds of country music with rock and blues music, and mixed with the anger of an alienated subculture of the nation during the period. The leaders of the movement were Waylon Jennings and Willie Nelson, although others associated with the movement were David Allan Coe, Jessi Colter, Tompall Glaser, Gary Stewart and Billy Joe Shaver. The efforts of Jennings, Nelson, Colter and Glaser were encapsulated in the 1976 album Wanted! The Outlaws.

The country pop sound was a successor to the countrypolitan sound of the early 1970s. In addition to artists such as Murray and Campbell, several artists who were not initially marketed as country were enjoying crossover success with country audiences through radio airplay and sales. The most successful of these artists included The Bellamy Brothers, Charlie Rich, John Denver, Olivia Newton-John, Marie Osmond, Starland Vocal Band, B. J. Thomas and Kenny Rogers. Newton-John, an Australian pop singer, was named Female Vocalist of the Year by the Country Music Association, sparking a debate that continues to this day – what is country music? A group of traditional-minded artists, troubled by this trend, formed the short-lived Association of Country Entertainers, in an attempt to bring back traditional honky-tonk sounds to the forefront. The debate continued into 1975, a year where six songs reached No. 1 on both the Billboard Hot Country Singles and Billboard Hot 100 charts. Things came to a head when, at that year's CMA Awards, Rich – the reigning Entertainer of the Year, and himself a crossover artist – presented the award to his successor, "my good friend, Mr. John Denver." His statement, taken as sarcasm, and his setting fire to the envelope (containing Denver's name) with a cigarette lighter were taken as a protest against the increasing pop style in country music.

By the later half of the 1970s, Dolly Parton, a highly successful traditional-minded country artist since the late 1960s, mounted a high-profile campaign to crossover to pop music, culminating in her 1977 hit "Here You Come Again," which peaked at No. 1 country and No. 3 pop. Rogers, the former lead singer of The First Edition, followed up a successful career in pop, rock and folk music by switching to country music. Like Parton, he enjoyed a long series of successful songs that charted on both the Hot Country Singles and Billboard Hot 100 charts; the first of the lot was "Lucille," a No. 1 country and No. 5 pop hit. Crystal Gayle, Ronnie Milsap, Eddie Rabbitt and Linda Ronstadt were some of the other artists who also found success on both the country and pop charts with their records as well.

The 1970s continued a trend toward a proliferation of No. 1 hits on the Billboard Hot Country Singles chart. In 1970, there were 23 songs that reached the top spot on the chart, but by the mid-1970s, more than 40 titles rotated in and out of the top spot for the first time in history. The trend temporarily reversed itself by the late 1970s, when about 30 to 35 songs reached the pinnacle position of the chart annually.

== Other developments ==
In the second half of the decade, a 1950s nostalgia movement prompted the Rockabilly Revival fad. The Stray Cats led the revival into the early 1980s. Billy Joel provided "Piano Man" and "Only The Good Die Young". Also symbolizing this trend was the hit movie Grease in 1978, starring John Travolta and Olivia Newton-John.

Tying in with the nostalgia craze, several stars of the late 1950s and early 1960s successfully revived their careers during the early- to mid-1970s after several years of inactivity. The most successful of these were Ricky Nelson ("Garden Party", 1972), Neil Sedaka ("Laughter in the Rain" and "Bad Blood", both 1975), and Frankie Valli as both a solo artist (1975's "My Eyes Adored You") and with The Four Seasons (1976's "December, 1963 (Oh, What a Night)"). In addition, Perry Como—one of the most successful pre-rock era artists—enjoyed continued success, albeit on a somewhat smaller scale (as most of his fans were adults who grew up during the 1940s and early 1950s, and not the rock record-buying youth); his most successful hits of the decade were "It's Impossible" (1970) and the Don McLean song "And I Love Her So" (1973). Two of popular music's most successful artists died within six weeks of each other in 1977: Elvis Presley (on August 16) and Bing Crosby (on October 14). Presley—whose top 1970s hit was "Burning Love" in 1972— ranked among the top artists of the rock era, while Crosby was among the most successful pre-rock era artists.

The early seventies also marked the deaths of rock legends Jim Morrison, Janis Joplin, and Jimi Hendrix as well as the plane crash in 1977 in which three members of Lynyrd Skynyrd were killed.

== See also ==
- Music history of the United States in the 1950s
- Music history of the United States in the 1960s
- Music history of the United States in the 1980s
- Music history of the United States in the 1990s
