= Timeline of music in the United States to 1819 =

Timeline of music in the United States
To 1819; 1820–1849; 1850–1879; 1880–1919	1920–1949; 1950–1969; 1970–2000; 2001–present
Music history of the United States
Colonial era – to the Civil War – During the Civil War – Late 19th century – 1900–1940 – 1950s – 1960s – 1970s – 1980s

This is a timeline of music in the United States prior to 1819.

Contents:	Before 1500: circa 500 - circa 1000 - circa 1300; 16th century: 1540 - 1559 - 1564 - 1565 - 1598; 17th century: 1607 - 1612 - 1619 - 1620 - 1626 - 1628 - 1633 - 1640 - 1642 - 1645 - 1651 - 1653 - 1655 - 1659 - 1667 - 1677 - 1680 - 1685 - 1687 - 1694 - 1698; 18th century: 1704 - 1707 - 1710 - 1713 - 1714 - 1716 - 1717 - 1718 - 1719 - 1720 - 1721 - 1723 - 1725 - 1729 - 1730 - 1732 - 1733 - 1734 - 1735 - 1736 - 1737 - 1739 - 1741 - 1742 - 1744 - 1746 - 1750 - 1752 - 1753 - 1754 - 1755 - 1756 - 1757 - 1758 - 1759 - 1761 - 1763 - 1764 - 1766 - 1767 - 1768 - 1769 - 1770 - 1774 - 1775 - 1776 - 1777 - 1778 - 1779 - 1780 - 1781 - 1782 - 1783 - 1784 - 1786 - 1787 - 1788 - 1789 - 1790 - 1791 - 1792 - 1793 - 1794 - 1795 - 1796 - 1797 - 1798 - 1799; 19th century: 1800 - 1801 - 1802 - 1803 - 1804 - 1805 - 1807 - 1808 - 1809 - 1810 - 1811 - 1812 - 1813 - 1814 - 1815 - 1816 - 1817 - 1818 - 1819; References - Notes - Further reading

== circa 500 ==
- Approximate: The oldest archeological remains of rasps, made from sheep horn, wood, deer bone, antelope scapula and elk rib, can be dated to approximately this timeframe.
- 620-670 C.E.: Earliest wood flutes from the Prayer Rock district of NorthEastern Arizona.

== circa 1000 ==
- Approximate: Copper and clay bells can be dated to this era, and were traded across the Mississippi Valley and into Mexico.

== circa 1300 ==
- Approximate: Percussion stones from the Pueblo region of the Rio Grande can be dated to the 14th century.

== 1540 ==
- A Franciscan priest named Juan de Padilla, a member of an exploration group led by Francisco Vázquez de Coronado, crosses from what is now Mexico to what is now New Mexico, where de Padilla taught plainsong and Catholic liturgy to the Moqui, Pueblo, and Zuñi Native Americans

== 1559 ==
- Missionary and musician Pedro Martín de Feria begins teaching plainsong liturgy to Native Americans near what is now Pensacola, Florida.

== 1564 ==
- The first Protestant music to leave historical documentation comes from the French Huguenots, who found a colony at Fort Caroline, near where Jacksonville, Florida, is today. These settlers probably sang from the Geneva Psalter.

== 1565 ==
- The first permanent European settlement in what is now the United States is St. Augustine, Florida, created by the Spanish. The music there includes Spanish styles and the African music of slaves and free blacks; this is the beginning of African American music.

== 1598 ==
- The "first documented European music education" in the United States begins in a colony in New Mexico, founded by a group of Spanish friars accompanying Juan de Oñate.

== 1607 ==
- Jamestown, Virginia, becomes the first permanent settlement by the British in what is now the United States.

== 1612 ==
- The Book of Psalmes: Englished Both in Prose and Metre is published in Amsterdam by Henry Ainsworth. This book will be the basis for the psalmody of the Pilgrims who colonize New England.

== 1619 ==
- The first African slaves were brought to Virginia, marking the beginning of African American music

== 1620 ==
- The Pilgrims arrive in Plymouth, Massachusetts, who begin the well-documented sacred song tradition of New England. The psalmody of the Pilgrims and other early New England Protestants was "spare and plain", reflecting their Calvinist theology.
- John Utie, the first fiddler in the United States, lands in Virginia.

== 1626 ==
- The oldest known liturgical book in what is now New Mexico can be dated to this year.

== 1628 ==
- The history of Christian church music in New York City begins with the foundation of a church by Dutch Reformed pastor Jonas Michaelius.

== 1633 ==
- The earliest documentation of military music in the future United States comes from drummers in Virginia performing for drill practices.

== 1640 ==
- The Bay Psalm Book is published in Cambridge, Massachusetts; it is the first full-length book published in the English colonies, and became the basis for psalmody in the Protestant congregations of New England until the 18th century. It is prepared by Richard Mather, John Eliot and Thomas Weld.

== 1642 ==
- Jean de Brébeuf composes a song in Huron, using the French melody of "Une Jeune Pucelle", to create a song known in English as "Twas in the Moon of Wintertime", which has been called the first North American Christmas carol.

== 1645 ==
- The Dutch Reformed Church in New York colony orders the precentor (voorzanger) to "tune the psalm" for the congregation to sing along; this practice consisted of the leader singing a line, which is then repeated, and often elaborated upon, by the audience. This practice is later known as lining out and is a crucial feature of African American church music.

== 1651 ==
- The Bay Psalm Book is published in its third edition, its definitive form, often called the New England Psalm Book. There is, as yet, no music provided in the collection.

== 1653 ==
- The earliest known military band is formed in New Hampshire, consisting of fifteen oboists and two drummers.

== 1655 ==
- The first documented music in New Sweden (now New Jersey) is from the military, when Governor Johan Risingh exited a fort with drums and trumpets or fifes playing to meet with the Dutch forces to whom he was capitulating.

== 1659 ==
- Fray García de San Francisco founds a Catholic mission in what is now El Paso, Texas, making him perhaps the first music teacher in the future United States.

== 1667 ==
- The Pilgrim congregation in Salem, Massachusetts, votes to stop using the Henry Ainsworth psalm collection because the tunes were considered too difficult.

== 1677 ==
- The General Assembly of East New Jersey bans the "singing of vain songs or tunes" on the Sabbath.

== 1680 ==
- The Pueblo Revolt leads to the destruction of the Spanish missions in what is now New Mexico, obliterating all known printed music and other musical documentation.

== 1685 ==
- The Pilgrim congregation in Plymouth, Massachusetts, votes to stop using the Henry Ainsworth psalm collection because the tunes were considered too difficult.

== 1687 ==
- Money is authorized by several Virginia counties to purchase drums and trumpets for use in their state militia.

== 1694 ==
- Johannes Kelpius, leader of the German Pietists who settled near Philadelphia, brings an organ, becoming the first individual in the future United States to do so.

== 1698 ==
- The ninth edition of the Bay Psalm Book is published. It is the first to feature printed music.

== 1704 ==
- Christopher Witt comes to America, where he will build his own pipe organ, becoming the first private organ-owner in the United States.
- Elias Neau is sent by the Society for the Propagation of the Gospel to minister to black slaves in North America; he opens a school, which includes psalm singing as part of the daily program.

== 1707 ==
- Isaac Watts' Hymns and Spiritual Songs revitalizes church music in the colonial United States. The book's influence on African American hymnody is "enormous", and it is "well known and greatly admired" throughout North America.

== 1710 ==
- The first concert in New York City is a private affair, at the home of a Mr. Broughton.

== 1713 ==
- George Brownell of Boston becomes perhaps the first dancing master in the United States.

== 1714 ==
- The first permanent church organ in the United States, the Brattle organ, imported by Thomas Brattle, is installed in Boston at King's Chapel. The colonial American aversion to music, which was viewed as sinful, led to the church leaving the organ unpacked for a full year before actually installing it.
- John Tufts publishes the first instructional book for singing in the country. It was extremely successful.

== 1716 ==
- The first theatre in North America is built in Williamsburg, Virginia.

== 1717 ==
- The first organized classes in music are organized in New England, for the improvement of church music.

== 1718 ==
- The first Spanish colony in Texas is established at San Antonio, thus marking the beginning of Tejano music.

== 1719 ==
- Africans are first brought to New Orleans in large numbers, bringing with them new styles of music straight from Africa.
- Thomas Fleet publishes Songs for the Nursery, one of the earliest published collections of secular music in the American colonies. It is the origin of Mother Goose songs like "Baa, Baa, Black Sheep".

== 1720 ==
- The lined-out style of hymnody begins to be criticized for abandoning conservative notation in favor of an oral tradition.
- Reverend Thomas Symmes publishes an essay, The Reasonableness of Regular Singing, in which he proposes schools to educate the public in psalm singing. Such schools were to become a major musical institution in New England in the 18th and 19th centuries.
- The Amish arrive in Pennsylvania, thus beginning the Amish music tradition in the United States.
- The Ephrata Cloister is founded in Lancaster County, Pennsylvania; they will develop their own musical system and form of hymnody.

Early 1720s music trends
- New England psalmody begins to grow more organized and disciplined, through singing schools and other institutions. Public concerts, held alongside lectures or sermons, begin to be held in small towns throughout the region.

== 1721 ==
- Two psalm collections are published in Boston, the first two emphasize the music and instructions for singing the tunes over the sacred verses of the psalms. These were John Tufts' An Introduction to the Singing of Psalm Tunes and Thomas Walters' The Grounds and Rules of Musick, Explained. These two publications "began a new era in American music history: between them they formed a point of contact between music as an art with a technical basis and a public motivated to learn that technique". Walter's is particularly influential and highly regarded, and is the first book to be printed (by James Franklin) with bar lines in British North America.

== 1723 ==
- Nero Benson, a trumpeter of Framingham, Massachusetts, is the first documented black army musician in the United States.

Mid 1720s music trends
- Group country dancing becomes popular, both in the North American colonies and Great Britain, especially line dances known as longways.

== 1725 ==
- The first music school in Louisiana is founded by Raphael de Luxembourg

== 1729 ==
- The first public concert in the country is held in Boston, in a room used by a local dancing master for assemblies.

== 1730 ==
- The first singing school in the United States is formed in Charleston, South Carolina, where music is taught by John Salter at a boarding school for girls run by his wife. Salter is the first secular music teacher in the country.
- The first opera written by an American to be both published and produced is The Fashionable Lady; or, Harlequin's Opera by James Ralph, which is premiered this year in London.

== 1732 ==
- Conrad Beissel founds the Ephrata Cloister in Pennsylvania; the Cloister embraces hymn-singing enthusiastically.
- The first performance of "the American musical stage" occurs in Charleston, South Carolina.

== 1733 ==
- The first song recital in the country is held in Charleston, South Carolina. Only English and Scotch songs are performed.
- The first "organ actually designed for church use" is installed in Newport, Rhode Island, in Trinity Church.

== 1734 ==
- John Wesley's A Collection of Psalms and Hymns is the "first book of religious music published in the colonies".
- The first newspaper advertisement concerning a fugitive slave with a reference to the slave's musical ability comes from American Weekly Mercury, about runaway Samuel Leonard of Perth Amboy, New Jersey, a half-Native American, half-African fiddler.

== 1735 ==
- Charleston, South Carolina, hosts the first performance of a ballad opera, Flora: Or Hob in the Well, in the United States on February 18, at the New World Theatre. The city also hosts a production of The Adventures of Harlequin and Scaramouch, the first pantomime ballet in the United States.
- Georgia's Governor James Oglethorpe invites minister John Wesley to come with him to Georgia, on a ship with Moravian missionaries whose hymn-singing had a profound effect on Wesley, who would go on to lead the Great Awakening of Christianity, often expressed through music. Music historian David W. Stowe has called this the most profound event in the history of American sacred music.
- John Peter Zenger is imprisoned in New York after publishing ballads about the political opposition. His lawyer, Andrew Hamilton, successfully argues that the jury should judge the law – whether or not the ballads were justly considered libelous – rather than simply the fact of publication. The not guilty verdict is a precedent for freedom of speech, freedom of the press and jury rights.

== 1736 ==
- Charles Theodore Pachelbel gives the first documented public concert in New York City.
- The oldest surviving music from New Orleans dates to this year. It is a piece of sacred music.
- The first major instrument manufacturer in the United States, John Clemm, comes to Philadelphia, where he will establish an organ and piano business.
- Hanover, Virginia, hosts the first documented fiddling contest in the country.

== 1737 ==
- St. Philip's Church in Charleston, South Carolina, hires Charles Theodore Pachelbel as its organist, one of the earliest churches to hire a high-profile organist in the country.
- John Wesley publishes A Collection of Psalms and Hymns, inspired by the Moravians of Pennsylvania; the hymnal launches his career.

== 1739 ==
- The slaves of the Stono Rebellion - the largest slave rebellion in British North America - in South Carolina are reported to use drums to recruit fighters, and music and dancing for emboldening the rebels. As a result, African American drumming is banned in South Carolina.

== 1741 ==
- Trinity Church in New York begins instructing African Americans in psalmody, one of the earliest examples of formal African American music instruction; the teacher is organist Johann Gottlob Klem (John Clemm).
- Religious persecution at home leads to a wave of German-speaking Moravian immigrants, who will play a vital role in establishing American concert music, become known for their brass choirs and become among the earliest instrument manufacturers in the country. They will settle in Bethlehem, Pennsylvania this year, flourishing and becoming widely known for their music.
- English hymn writer John Cennick publishes his first collection, Sacred Hymns for the Children of God; he will go on to become the "real founder of folky religious song in the rebellious eighteenth century movement".

== 1742 ==
- John and Charles Wesley publish their first collection of hymns with music, the Foundery Collection.
- The hymnal of the Mennonites, Der Ausbund: Das ist etliche christliche Lieder, is first published in the United States in Germantown, Pennsylvania.

== 1744 ==
- The first organ designed for church use in Boston is installed at Trinity Church in Boston.

== 1746 ==
- The oldest extant manuscript of Das Gesäng de einsamen und verlassenen Turtel-Taub (Turtle-Taube), the central music text of the Ephrata Cloister, dates to this year; it is the first original hymnbook published in the American colonies.

Early 1750s music trends
- The custom of giving African American workers vacations during the spring election period begins in Connecticut; the workers establish secular festivals that include song and dance, with elections of "governors" and "kings" as part of the celebrations.

== 1750 ==
- Though the ban may not have been strictly or effectively enforced, the city of Boston prohibits theater entertainment, due to a Puritan influence that treated theater as a negative institution that symbolized a "preference for idleness and pleasure over hard work and thrift".
- The first comic ballad opera, The Beggar's Opera by John Gay, is first performed in the colonial United States, in New York City; it goes on to become hugely successful, and among the most popular pieces of the period.
- Approximate: The African American 'Lection Day holiday, in which blacks paraded and elected an honorary ruler, is first celebrated, in Connecticut.
- An organ at Zion Lutheran Church in New Germantown, New Jersey, is the first documented organ in that state; the first organ in Pennsylvania also arrives in this year.

== 1752 ==
- William Tuckey comes to New York City, where he will become the city's first music teacher.

== 1753 ==
- The British Museum has had a drum since this date, made in Virginia from local wood and deer skin, but in a manner typical of the Ashanti of Ghana, a major piece of evidence for African retention in African American music. It is also similar to the apinti drum of the Afro-Guyanese.

== 1754 ==
- An unused room in a building becomes the first concert hall in Boston.

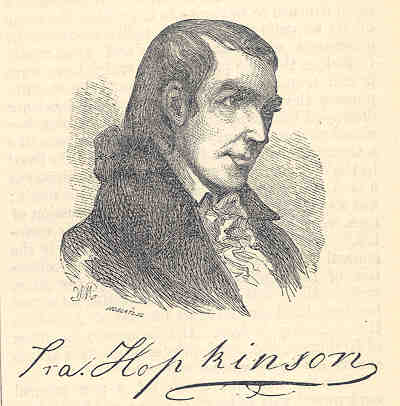
Francis Hopkinson, an early American composer

== 1755 ==
- The British begin expelling the French-speaking Acadians from Canada, many of whom will go to Louisiana, providing an important foundation for both Cajun music and Louisiana Creole music.
- An English surgeon composes the words to "Yankee Doodle", which will become the most popular song in the country in the latter part of the Revolutionary War. It will remain the only national song of the United States until the War of 1812.

== 1756 ==
- The first documented public performance by a military band in the British colonies comes in a Philadelphia parade this year.

== 1757 ==
- William Smith's Alfred, produced by the College of Philadelphia, is the first "documented serious opera written and performed in the United States".
- Full military bands are sent to North America by the British, hoping to alleviate reluctance by the colonialists to join the British militias. New bands will arrive every year during the French and Indian War.

== 1758 ==
- The First Church of Boston forms a choir, the first of many New England churches to do so in the next decade.
- The earliest known reference to music in a newspaper advertisement comes from the Newport Mercury of Newport, Rhode Island. The advertisement seeks a violinist.

== 1759 ==
- An ode by James Lyon for Princeton College's graduation and Francis Hopkinson's "My Days Have Been So Wondrous Free" are both composed; these two pieces are each cited as the first original musical composition by an American composer. Hopkinson has been called the first secular composer in the American colonies, and "My Days Have Been So Wondrous Free" is the first American secular song.

Early 1760s music trends
- Music instructor James Brenner begins teaching in a coffeehouse in Philadelphia.
- Francis Hopkinson begins playing harpsichord in concert; he would go on to be among the most influential composers of the colonial era, and the first American composer for voice and harpsichord.

== 1761 ==
- James Lyon publishes in Philadelphia the "first American tunebook to address the needs of both congregation and choir", Urania, or a Choice Collection of Psalm-Tunes, Anthems, and Hymns. This tunebook offers "something for every kind of sacred singer" and "was the first American tunebook to bring psalmody straight into the commercial arena", showing "how psalmody... could find a niche in the marketplace". The collection features the first published American anthems, fuging tunes and hymn tunes. It is also the first work to identify its songs as "new", meaning composed in the colonies. Twenty-eight of the songs include both music and text, and are the first such printings in the country.
- Barzillai Lew, a free-born African American musician from Massachusetts, becomes an Army fifer and drummer during the French and Indian War. His wife, Dinah Bowman, is the first black woman in history to be identified as a pianist. The Lew family is prominent in the area around Dracut, Massachusetts, and the family remains musically renowned well into the 20th century.

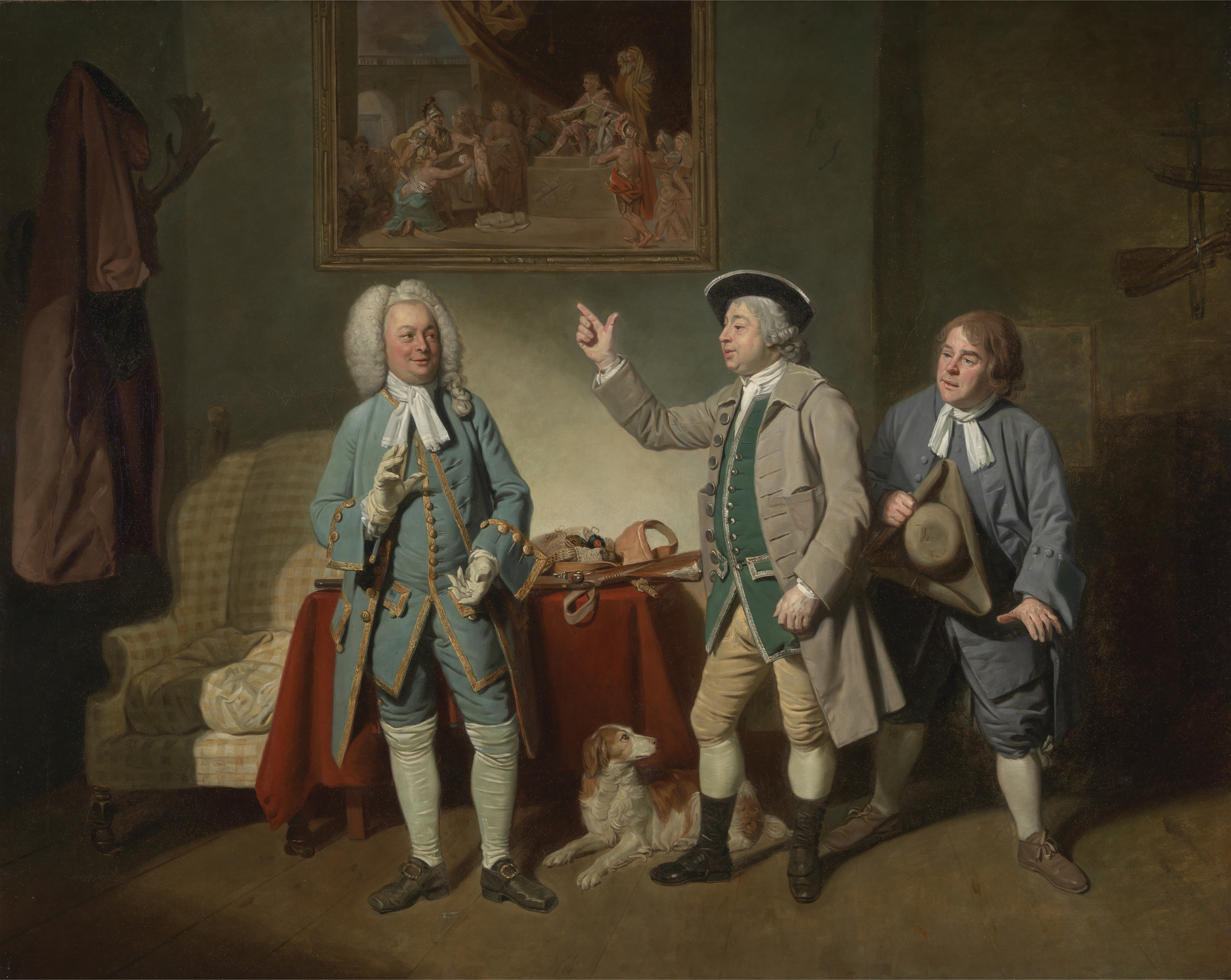
A scene from Love in a Village, a pasticcio of the 1760s

== 1763 ==
- Savannah, Georgia's first theater opens.
- The Moravian Church of Salem, North Carolina, publishes a hymn book in the language of the Delaware Indians.

== 1764 ==
- Approximate: Newport Gardner, reportedly the first African American singing-school master is said to have composed the "Promised Anthem".
- The only description of secular music among the Swedes in what is now New Jersey comes from Carl Magnus Wrangel, who reports that jubilant music and dance was common in private homes.

== 1766 ==
- A pasticcio called Love in a Village, with music by Thomas Arne and based on a play by Isaac Bickerstaffe, becomes a major part of the American theater repertory after performances in Charleston and Philadelphia; it is also considered the first English comic opera.
- Charleston, South Carolina, becomes home to the first musical society in the United States, the St. Cecilia Society.

== 1767 ==
- Andrew Barton's The Disappointment; Or, the Force of Credulity is the first American ballad opera, and the first opera with a plot based in the United States. Its libretto is the first of its kind (comic opera) written and published in the country. It is not, however, performed until the 20th century. The scheduled debut in Philadelphia is cancelled because the opera "contained personal Reflections [sic] (and) is unfit for the stage", according to The Pennsylvania Gazette.
- The first reference to an African American dance comes from a description of a performance by Mr. Tea in a stage show documented in the New York Journal.
- The first American patriotic song, known as "Liberty Song", advertised in the Boston Chronicle, with words by Mercy Otis Warren.
- The first detailed account of an American military band concert comes the Royal American Regiment (Sixtieth Foot) in New York.

Late 1760s music trends
- British patriotic songs begin to be changed into anti-British protests circulated through newspapers and broadsides.
- Itinerant music instructor John Stadler travels across Virginia, teaching music to families like the wealthy Carters and the Washingtons

== 1768 ==
- An advertisement in the Boston Chronicle is one of the first for sheet music, for "Liberty Song", in the United States.

== 1769 ==
- A concert is organized by John Gualdo in Philadelphia; this consisted of a wide range of pieces, much of which was composed by Gualdo himself, leading some historians to refer to this as the first "composers'-concert" in the United States.
- Roman Catholic missionary activity begins to "severely devastate" the civilizations of central coast and southern California, bringing new forms of Roman Catholic music to the indigenous peoples of California.
- In Isaac Bickerstaffe's comic opera The Padlock, the actor Lewis Hallam the Younger performs "Dear Heart! What a Terrible Life I Am Led", the first documentation of a white stage presentation of an African American-styled song.
- John Harris of Boston becomes the first spinet-maker in the United States.
- An anonymous manuscript published by John Boyles of Boston, Abstract of Geminiani's Art of Playing on the Violin is the first known instrumental education book in the future United States.

== 1770 ==
- William Billings' The New-England Psalm-Singer is the first compilation of entirely American music and the first compiled by a native-born American to be published, first major publication by a singing master, and the first tunebook in the country dedicated to the music of a single composer. The most famous song in the compilation is "Chester", which will be an unofficial anthem for Americans during the Revolutionary War. Its publication begins a flourishing of distinctively American New England publications of sacred tunes ("First New England School"). Billings himself will go on to become one of the first major figures in American music history, and is said to have been the first to introduce both the pitch pipe and the violoncello to the New England church choir.
- William Tuckey, an organist and choirmaster in New York's Trinity Church, presents a performance from Handel's Messiah, the first performance from that piece in the United States.

== 1774 ==
- The first Shakers arrive in the United States, beginning American Shaker music.
- English traveler Nicholas Cresswell notes a song which he describes as a "Negro tune". This "may well represent the earliest record of the influence of slave music on the white colonists". His work also contains the first reference to a banjo.
- George Leile, one of the first African Americans with official permission to preach, travels along the Savannah River preaching to slaves. He eventually formed one of the earliest self-governing black churches in the country, in Silver Bluff, South Carolina.
- Samson Occom, a Native American minister, publishes the first hymnal to contain refrains.
- John (Johann) Behrent constructs a piano, and is said to have been the first person in what is now the United States to do so.

== 1775 ==
- Psalmodist Andrew Law graduates from Rhode Island College, soon becoming an influential tunebook publisher and singing master.
- "To Anacreon in Heaven" is published in England; it serves as the tune for many patriotic songs of late 18th and early 19th century, including "The Star-Spangled Banner", the national anthem of the United States.
- At a celebration following the victory of Ethan Allen's Green Mountain Boys in the fight to capture Fort Ticonderoga, a band performs. This is the first documented performance of a military band in celebration of battle.
- The Continental Congress authorizes the creation of the Continental Army, the precursor to the United States Army. The authorization specifically requires the hiring of a drummer or trumpeter.

== 1776 ==
- The Shakers, led by Ann Lee, settle at Niskayuna, New York, forming a communal religious society that used dance and music as an essential and sacred element of the religion.
- George Washington, worried that poor quality performance by musicians during drill practices would hinder military performance in battle, establishes tighter conditions for military bands in the Continental Army.

== 1777 ==
- Trumpets are added to military bands in the Continental Army to control the maneuvers of cavalry.
- The inspired musicianship of military drummers and fifers, under the command of Colonel John Stark, is credited with victory at the Battle of Bennington.

== 1778 ==
- William Billings' The Singing Master's Assistant includes songs that link the plight of the Israelites in Egyptian captivity with the lives of Bostonians of the time. This tunebook influentially "treated Scripture not only as a guide to spiritual inspiration and moral improvement, but as a historical epic that, bringing past into present, offered timeless parallels to current events".
- Andrew Law and his brother form a tunebook-printing company in Cheshire, Connecticut, beginning with 1779's Select Harmony, which reveals Law as a "champion of American composers, at a time when the notion that Americans could compose music at all was a new one".
- Thomas Jefferson presents a view common to many of the upper-class elite in North America, in a letter to Giovanni Fabbroni complaining that American music was in a state of "deplorable barbarism".
- A reorganization of the Continental Army establishes pay grades of military musicians and creates staff positions for drum and fife majors.

== 1779 ==
- Friedrich Wilhelm von Steuben issues a manual, soon approved by Congress, which establishes the positions of military musicians and standardizes musical calls.

== 1780 ==
- Composer Johann Friedrich Peter moves to the Moravian settlement in Salem, North Carolina, where he will become a musical institution and found the Collegium Musicum, as well as collect a great number of musical manuscripts.

== 1781 ==
- Due to a manpower shortage, military musicians come to be chosen from enlisted men, rather than from performers who enlisted solely as musicians. This is the first evidence of musicians doing soldierly duties in the American army.
- Francis Hopkinson composes the first American Grand Opera, America Independent, Or the Temple of Minerva.

== 1782 ==
- James Aird's Selection of Scotch, English, Irish and Foreign Airs is published, containing the earliest known printing of "Yankee Doodle".

== 1783 ==
- The Revolutionary War ends after the Treaty of Paris, and George Washington allows military musicians to keep their instruments as recognition for their dedication and service.

== 1784 ==
- Joel Barlow of Connecticut edits the very popular hymns of Isaac Watts to remove content supporting British sovereignty.

== 1786 ==
- The city of New Orleans bans slaves from dancing in public squares on holy days and Sundays until after evening church services.
- The first Sunday school in the United States is established in Virginia; Sunday schools will become a major part of religious music instruction throughout the country.
- The Stoughton Musical Society, which remains in existence today, is founded in Stoughton, Massachusetts; this is also the beginning of American choral societies. It may be the oldest continuous musical organization in the country, and is the oldest choral society in the United States, and has been called the "earliest musical organization of importance".
- Johann Friedrich Peter founds the Collegium Musicum in Salem, North Carolina.
- Daniel Read and Amos Doolittle begin issuing the American Musical Magazine, the earliest music periodical in Anglo North America.

== 1787 ==
- John Aitken becomes the first American publisher of strictly music, and the first to publish secular sheet music in the United States. Most of the music is composed or arranged by Alexander Reinagle. Aitken engraves Reinagle's A Selection of the Most Favorite Scots-Irish Tunes, which is the first use of punching tools to engrave music in the country.
- Johannes Herbst, a Moravian bishop and hymn writer, begins collecting music manuscripts. His archive is not publicly available until 1977.

== 1788 ==
- Andrew Bryan founds the First African Baptist Church in Savannah, Georgia, the first "permanent (African American) congregation in the nation".
- John Griffiths, an itinerant New England dancing master, publishes A Collection of the Newest and Most Fashionable Country Dances and Cotillions, the first collection of country dances in the United States.

== 1789 ==
- The Constitution of the United States comes into effect, granting Congress the power to "promote the Progress of Science and useful Arts, by securing for limited Times to Authors and Inventors the exclusive Right to their respective Writings and Discoveries", the beginning of American copyright law.
- A ban on theatrical music is lifted, for the first time since the American Revolution.

== 1790 ==
- The first theater opens in Augusta, Georgia.
- The first copyright act is passed in the United States.
- The first piece of music to be copyrighted is Andrew Adgate's Rudiments of Music.
- The first singing contest in the United States is held, between the choirs of Dorchester, Massachusetts, and Stoughton, Massachusetts.

== 1791 ==
- A slave named Newport Gardner wins a lottery and buys his freedom, opening a singing school and becoming one of the first African American music teachers.
- The ban on theaters in Philadelphia is ended.

== 1792 ==
- Congress passes a law requiring all able-bodied white males to join a state militia; the result helps spur the development of military bands, as opposed to fife-and-drum corps, which Congress authorizes for the first time the same year. The Militia Act standardized the instrumentation of military bands.
- Thomas Wignell forms a theatrical company in Philadelphia, with Alexander Reinagle as his music director.

== 1793 ==
- The ban on theater entertainment in Boston ends.
- John Aitken ends his music publishing career for a time, as composer Alexander Reinagle become music director for the New Theater in Philadelphia. One impetus for Aitken's ending his business comes from increased competition, as the American music publishing industry diversifies and competitors arise in New York, Boston and Baltimore.
- Benjamin Carr opens a musical instrument shop in Philadelphia, and soon begins publishing music as well, one of the first music publishing ventures in the United States. His periodical The Gentleman's Amusement included Philip Phile's "The President's March", which is later the tune for "Hail, Columbia".

== 1794 ==
- The first sheet music to be registered for copyright under the new US Constitution was The Kentucky Volunteer, music by Raynor Taylor, lyrics by "a woman of Philadelphia". This was the published by Benjamin Carr, most prolific American music publisher in the 1790s.
- A comic opera called The Children in the Wood premiers in Philadelphia; with music by Samuel Arnold and libretto by Thomas Morton, the opera becomes wildly popular in the United States.
- Andrew Law publishes The Art of Singing, a trio of books aimed at educating Americans in music; these publications "represent nothing less than a conversion in musical taste", as he abandoned American composers in favor of European principles of composition.
- Ann Hatton and James Hewitt's Tammany; or, The Indian Chief is both the first American opera on a Native American subject and the first on an American subject of any kind. It is also the first with a female librettist.

Mid 1790s music trends
- Though the publisher Andrew Law had gained fame for compiling American and British compositions in his tunebooks as equals, his increasingly British-oriented compilations begin to lose commercial ground to works that mix both American and British compositions, indicating a growing American musical sensibility.

== 1795 ==
- Oliver Holden, with Hans Gram and Samuel Adams Holyoke, publishes The Massachusetts Compiler, the most "up-to-date manual of music theory" from the United States to that time.

== 1796 ==
- The French opera tradition in New Orleans begins with a production of Silvain, an opera by André Ernest Modeste Grétry. New Orleans will remain the center for opera in the United States until the 1860s.
- William Dunlap and Benjamin Carr's The Archers is one of the first major American operas to enter the standard repertoire.

== 1797 ==
- The Pocket Hymn Book is published in Philadelphia. It will become the standard collection of hymns for the camp meetings of the Great Awakening of the early 19th century.

== 1798 ==
- William Smith and William Little successfully copyright a shape note system that would become the standard in the 19th century.
- The first complete work to be copyrighted is a pair of ballads, "Ellen Arise: A Ballad" and "The Little Sailor Boy: A Ballad", both by Benjamin Carr.
- The first governmental subsidy for music comes in the form of the United States Marine Band, led by Drum Major William Farr; this is the first military musical establishment in the United States.
- The first political campaign song is "Adams and Liberty", set to the tune of "To Anacreon in Heaven", by Robert Treat Paine.
- The song "Hail, Columbia", set to the music of "The President's March", is published, with the intent of "arousing the American spirit"; it becomes one of the most popular and long-lasting patriotic songs in the country.
- The New Jersey Immorality Act bans "dancing, singing, fiddling, or other music for the sake of merriment".

== 1799 ==
- The Longhouse Religion of the Iroquois is founded by Handsome Lake; music and dance are integral parts of the burgeoning religion.

== 1800 ==
- Samuel Adams Holyoke's first volume of The Instrumental Assistant is the first "comprehensive instrumental and collection of traditional music for band instruments published" in the United States.
- The first camp meeting is held in Logan County, Kentucky, led by minister James McGready. Camp meetings will become an essential component of the Second Great Awakening of Christian fervor, which will dominate the "religious life of America's frontier communities". Hymn-singing was a major part of camp meetings.
- James Hewitt and William Dunlap Pizarro in Peru is the first "important American operatic melodrama".
- François Delochaire Mallet of France, Gottlieb Graupner of Germany, and Filippo Trajetta of Italy announce the founding of a music academy in Boston, called the American Conservatorio of Boston, in the Boston Gazette on November 24. It is the first such institution in the United States and lasted just two years.

== 1801 ==
- Reverend Richard Allen publishes A Collection of Spiritual Songs and Hymns for Bethel Church in Philadelphia; this is the first such collection "assembled by a black author for a black congregation". The collection includes works by Isaac Watts and others, as well as some that are unattributed and may have been composed by Allen himself. It was also the first collection "to employ the so-called wandering refrains -- that is, refrain verses or short choruses attached at random to orthodox hymn stanzas".
- William Smith and William Little publish The Easy Instructor in Philadelphia; it is the first shape note tunebook, which would become the standard for American shape note singing in the 19th century.
- Richard Allen publishes his own hymnal, A Collection of Spiritual Songs and Hymns, which becomes very popular.
- The first camp meeting is held near the Gasper River in Logan County, Kentucky; the diverse crowd forces the song leaders to keep the songs simple, leading to a style known as the camp meeting spiritual.

Early 19th century music trends
- Presbyterian clergy in Kentucky begin to hold camp meetings to promote Christian spirituality; these would go on to be run by Baptist and Methodist preachers as part of the Great Awakening of religious fervor.

== 1802 ==
- Publisher Andrew Law abandons traditional musical notation and copyrights his own system.
- William Little and William Smith publish The Easy Instructor, a book whose shape note system will become the standard in the United States.

== 1803 ==
- Publisher Andrew Law begins to publish in shape notes, with the publication of the fourth edition of The Musical Primer. His system had been copyrighted, but was surpassed by William Little and William Smith's The Easy Instructor, which used a slightly different system and quickly became the standard for American shape note singing.
- After the Louisiana Purchase, Etienne de Boré, the Mayor of New Orleans, is tasked with appointing a location for slaves to dance on Sundays; the place chosen will eventually be known as Congo Square.
- The earliest full description of the African American Pinkster day holiday comes from a poem published in Albany, New York.
- The earliest extant orchestral score for an American opera known to exist is The Voice of Nature by William Dunlap and Victor Pelissier, composed in this year.

== 1804 ==
- In Salem and western Middlesex County, Massachusetts, clergymen and other local leaders and singers begin advocating for a more formal and European style of religious musical expression.

mid-19th century music trends
- Presbyterian clergy begin to hold camp meetings to promote Christian spirituality; these would go on to be run by Baptist and Methodist preachers as part of the Great Awakening of religious fervor.
- Musical reformers in New England continue advocating for a return to traditionally European religious music, as organizations like the Middlesex Musical Society and the Essex Musical Association are formed
- Two important British-dominated tunebooks are published in 1805 and 1807. These lead to an increase in European-dominated tunebooks being published after the mid-19th century.

== 1805 ==
- Shape note singing grows in popularity and expands in influence after William Smith and William Little's The Easy Instructor is picked up by an Albany, New York publisher.
- The Salem Collection of Classical Sacred Musick is published in Salem, Massachusetts; it is described by traditionalist psalmodist Nathaniel D. Gould as a spearhead for musical reform in New England churches.
- Approximate: Musical reformers of psalmody, who promote "European standards and 'correct taste'", begin using the name of George Frideric Handel to symbolize the idealized music they prefer.
- Richard McNemar converts to become a Shaker; he will become known as the "Father of Shaker music", and is the most prolific composer of Shaker hymns and anthems.
- Librettist Lorenzo Da Ponte emigrates to the United States, where he will help to introduce opera to mainstream Americans.

== 1807 ==
- The Middlesex Collection of Church Musick is published in Boston; it is described by traditionalist psalmodist Nathaniel D. Gould as a spearhead for musical reform in New England churches.

== 1808 ==
- Congress ends the importation of new slaves.
- The age of popular parlor music begins with the first publication of Thomas Moore's Irish Melodies, in Dublin, London and Philadelphia. The collection popularizes parlor music to a large audience of mixed social and economic backgrounds. The collection also inspires a vogue for nostalgic, sentimental songs throughout the Anglophone world. Two of the most important songs from the collection are "The Last Rose of Summer" and "The Harp That Once Thro' Tara's Halls".
- The earliest extant full piano vocal score known to exist is from James Nelson Barker and John Bray's The Indian Princess; Or, La Belle Savauge, composed in this year.

== 1809 ==
- The first African American Baptist church is formed in Philadelphia.
- A manuscript prepared by Jacob Eckhard Sr. for the choir at St. Michael's Episcopal Church is one of the earliest documents containing Episcopal music.

== 1810 ==
- Johann Christian Gottlieb Graupner founds the Boston Philharmonic Society, the first semiprofessional orchestra in the city.
- The keyed bugle is invented by Joseph Holiday, allowing that instrument to be played fully chromatically.
- The first military band in New York City is formed, serving the 11th Regiment of the New York Militia and based on Bedloe's Island.

== 1811 ==
- Russian visitor Pavel Svinin visits an African American church in Philadelphia; this is one of the first written depictions of black church music in the United States.
- The first use of the word hit referring to a success in show business comes from this year. The word is borrowed from the game of backgammon.

Early 1810s music trends
- Three regions of shape note publishing take form, outside of New England: one was based in the South, especially Georgia and South Carolina, another was dominated by Germans between Philadelphia and the Shenandoah Valley, and the last stretched from Pennsylvania and the Shenandoah Valley westward to Cincinnati and St. Louis.

== 1812 ==
- A hymnbook, popularly called The Bridgewater Collection is first published; it will be used at least until well into the 20th century.
- Songs celebrating American naval victories in the War of 1812 include "Hull's Victory", which commemorates the capture of HMS Guerriere by USS Constitution.
- During the War of 1812, American military bands use bugles rather than drums and fifes as in the Revolutionary War.
- While British troops blockade American ports, European sheet music can not be imported, helping to spur the rise of the American music publishing industry.

== 1813 ==
- Irish songwriter Thomas Moore publishes "The Last Rose of Summer", a popular song that helped establish him as one of the best-known composers of American parlor songs.
- Thomas Carr and his father, Joseph Carr, create one of the earliest American music publishing outfits, beginning with Thomas' popular arrangement of "The Star-Spangled Banner".
- Millennial Praises, the first Shaker hymnal, is published in Hancock, Massachusetts. It contains only the text of the hymns.
- The military band at West Point Academy begins its formation. The modern incarnation of the West Point Band is not formally created until 1817.
- Folk hymns collected by trained musicians appear for the first time in Wyeth's Repository of Sacred Music, Part Second, beginning of the age of southern collector-compilers."

== 1814 ==
- Francis Scott Key writes what will become "The Star-Spangled Banner", which will become the official national anthem of the United States in 1931. It uses the tune of an English drinking song called "To Anacreon in Heaven" by John Stafford Smith.
- Rayner Taylor's romantic grand opera, The Acthiop; Or, The Child of the Desert, is a popular and influential composition, which remains in production into the 1860s.

== 1815 ==
- In Boston the Handel and Haydn Society is formed to "improve sacred music performance and promote the sacred works of eminent European masters". This marks "a new stage in Americans' recognition of music as an art". It remains an influential part of Bostonian culture.
- The keyed bugle is introduced to the United States. The keyed bugle led to the development of a whole new class of valved brass instruments called saxhorns after their French inventor, Antoine-Joseph Sax
- This is the earliest proffered date for the formation of the first minstrel troops.
- The song "Backside Albany", with a melody borrowed from the British folk song "Boyne Water", is the first blackface air.
- Thomas Hastings, a prolific publisher of church music and author, publishes his "first and most famous collection", Musica Sacra.

== 1816 ==
- The African Methodist Episcopal Church is founded in Philadelphia, which "established a racial division in American Protestantism; music was to remain a major part of the Church's spiritual expression.
- The earliest description of a specifically African American Christian music performance comes from George Tucker, who witnessed the song in Portsmouth, Virginia.
- Daniel Loomis becomes the first teacher of music at the West Point Academy, and George W. Gardiner is assigned commander of the West Point Band.
- Thomas Funk publishes Choral Music, a songbook that helps establish the American shape note singing tradition. Funk's descendants will carry on his legacy in founding Ruebush-Kieffer, a publishing company that will be the predecessor of most of the Southern religious music publishing firms of the late 19th and early 20th centuries.

Late 1810s music trends
- Thomas Hastings begins composing works that use European harmonic techniques; he is one of the few American composers of the era considered to have mastered these techniques.

== 1817 ==
- The city government of New Orleans limits African American dancing to Sundays before sundown in Congo Square, which would become a hotbed of musical mingling and innovation.
- Civilian Richard Willis is hired as teacher of music at the West Point Academy. The tradition of hiring civilians for this position will last until 1972. He will also introduce the keyed bugle to the American military.

== 1818 ==
- Music teacher, keyed bugler and bandleader Frank Johnson publishes Six Sets of Cotillions, establishing a career that will make him the leader of the "Philadelphia School", the first African American "school of classically trained composers". He also becomes the first African American to publish sheet music this year, and will later become the first widely acclaimed composer, both at home and in England, first to innovate a style or school elaborated upon by other individuals, first to give formal band concerts, and the first to perform with white musicians in public and the first to tour widely in the United States. He may be the first American of any race to tour abroad, in 1837.
- Richard Allen publishes a hymnal, the first for the African Methodist Episcopal Church, which became the world's "first black denomination" when it was founded in 1816.
- African Americans begin organizing their own camp meetings, start with one held this year by the African Methodist Episcopal Church, in Bucks County, Pennsylvania.
- Bohemian composer Anthony Philip Heinrich comes to the United States and is so impressed by the "natural scenery, (America's) exciting history, and the music of the Native American" that he began composing a string of works on these topics.

== 1819 ==
- John Fanning Watson, a Wesleyan Methodist, publishes a tract called Methodist Error, which criticizes clergy that hold camp meetings, on the basis that they were relatively racially egalitarian, and the music poorly composed and performed, especially by African Americans. Though his criticism is not entirely aimed at African Americans, the features he most identifies as religiously inappropriate are characteristically African American. His chief complaint is the use of refrains "of their own composing", referring to those include in the hymnal of Richard Allen from 1801.
- The "best-known stage for drama, concert music and opera" in Richmond, Virginia, the Richmond Theater, opens.
- John Siegling opens a music publishing firm, Siegling Music Company, in Charleston, South Carolina; it will last for many years, and will be the oldest music publishing company in operation by the time the Civil War begins.
