= Timeline of music in the United States (1970–2000) =

Timeline of music in the United States
To 1819; 1820–1849; 1850–1879; 1880–1919	1920–1949; 1950–1969; 1970–2000; 2001–present
Music history of the United States
Colonial era – to the Civil War – During the Civil War – Late 19th century – 1900–1940 – 1950s – 1960s – 1970s – 1980s

This is a timeline of music in the United States from 1970 to 2000, the end of the 20th century.

== 1970 ==
- Diana Ross leaves the Supremes, considered to be the most successful and influential girl group of all time, to embark upon a solo career after her final performance with the group on January 14, 1970, in Las Vegas, Nevada.
- Armadillo World Headquarters opens in Austin, Texas. It will become a major venue for the music of Austin, especially the local country scene.
- Black Sabbath's Black Sabbath and Paranoid codify the genre later known as heavy metal music; though Black Sabbath is British, heavy metal will become an important American phenomenon in the next decade.
- Charlie Gillett's The Sound of the City is the first comprehensive history of R&B and rock.
- Growing Latino "political unrest and cultural awakening" manifests in musical expression, especially in the formation of a group called El Chicano, who had a major hit with "Viva Tirado". "Viva Tirado" becomes the "first single to attain positions in all popular music categories except country and western".
- Francis Grasso opens the Sanctuary, the first "notoriously gay discothèque" in the country in the New York club scene; he innovates a technique called disco blending, which allows for uninterrupted dancing, laying the groundwork for disco music.
- Miles Davis' Bitches Brew is an important part of the origin of jazz-rock.
- Haitian performers with mini-djaz bands touring the United States begin deserting to settle in Miami and other cities, establishing a number of local Haitian music scenes.
- Nosotros, a Hollywood trade association for Latino entertainers, inaugurates what will become known as the Golden Eagle Awards, for Latino musicians.
- The works of Scott Joplin become the basis for a ragtime revival, inspired in large part by The Complete Piano Works of Scott Joplin, a recording by John W. Parker, and Scott Joplin: Piano Rags, a recording by Joshua Rifkin. Eubie Blake becomes the only ragtime pianist to ever record one of his own pieces, "Charleston Rag" (written in 1921).
- The case Sinatra v. Goodyear Tire & Rubber Co., though ultimately unsuccessful, contends for the first time that the use of a performer to imitate a different performer – in this case, Nancy Sinatra – could constitute the tort of passing off.
- Jamaican musician U-Roy becomes the first to record rhythmic speech over dubs, which is the direct ancestor of rapping, one of the elements of hip hop culture.
- Louis Wayne Ballard becomes the Director of Music Programs for the Bureau of Indian Affairs. He will be the first Native American to create educational materials on Native American music.
- The Stooges begin performing, becoming known for making physical contact with the crowd, one of the reasons they are considered an important predecessor of punk rock and hardcore.
- The first digital synthesizers are created.

== 1971 ==
Early 1970s music trends
- With more than 200 discos in Manhattan alone, New York City becomes the world capital of discotheques.
- Glam rock is created, based on British and American performers like David Bowie, New York Dolls and Lou Reed.
- Haitian cultural leaders form folkloric dance troupes in the United States, performing Haitian traditional music, including Mackandal, Troupe Shango, Ibo Dancers, Afro-Haitian Dance Company and Troupe Louines Louinis.
- The New Mexican Hispano trio of Al Hurricane, Tiny Morrie and Baby Gaby become the unofficial leaders of Onda Chicana, the Chicano Wave movement of social and cultural activism in the arts.
- The term rock changes from a "stylistic term into an umbrella, incorporating a myriad of musical styles, with only the audience as a common denominator.
- The Philly sound of soul, exemplified by the likes of The O'Jays and the Blue Notes, record Sigma Sound Studios.
- The word salsa enters wide usage in a musical context after it is used in Latin New York magazine.
- Segments of the music industry begin to express alarm at the spread of home taping, the practice of making recordings using a cassette recorder without purchasing a copy of the recorded music. Cassette manufacturers and consumers rights organizations maintain that the practice does not reduce sales of recorded music.
- Musicians begin installing multitrack recording facilities in their homes, the beginning of home recording.

- Andrew Lloyd Webber's Jesus Christ Superstar is an important musical that used elements of rock and soul.
- Edward V. Bonnemere's Missa a Nuestro Dio introduces jazz to the Lutheran church.
- Eileen Southern's Music of Black Americans: A History is a groundbreaking history that helps establish the study of African American music "as a scholarly specialty".
- George Harrison is sued by the Bright Tunes Music Corporation, which contends that Harrison infringed on Ronald Mack's "He's So Fine" (recorded by The Chiffons) in Harrison's "My Sweet Lord". The court finds that Harrison took the melody from the Mack song, based on "substantial similarity", and that Harrison committed subconscious plagiarism.
- Marvin Gaye's What's Going On is released to great commercial and critical acclaim. It is a "bold musical experiment filled with stream-of-consciousness social commentary". The result is the best-selling album in Motown's history.
- Portia K. Maultsby organizes the first African American popular music ensemble at a university (Indiana University) that constitutes a credit course.
- Robert E. Brown, with Sam and Louise Scripps, takes one of, if not the first, groups of American students to study music in Indonesia.
- The film Shaft and the following year's Super Fly innovate the style known as blaxploitation, which had profound effects on the aesthetic of black popular music over the next several decades.
- Wendy Carlos releases Timesteps, an important work that explores a "combination of imaginative programming and recording techniques", demonstrating "how the electronic medium could serve a composer who wanted to explore electronic sounds within the context of a more accessible concert music".
- Two federally funded music venues are created, Wolf Trap Farm Park in Virginia and the John F. Kennedy Center for the Performing Arts.
- Quadrophonic recording, which uses four separate channels for superior sound quality, is introduced.
- Twelve out of the hundred top country singles in country this year are recorded at Buck Owens Recording Studio, the primary studio of the Bakersfield sound.
- Sigma Sound Studios is the first to successfully use mix automation.

== 1972 ==
- American copyright law is amended to required recorded materials be archived with the Library of Congress.
- British singer David Bowie brings his Ziggy Stardust tour to the United States. Despite his popularity in the British counterculture, he is greeted with skepticism and indifference, indicating that the "global youth culture created by the Beatles, and ratified at the Monterey Pop Festival, was already beginning to fall apart".
- The movie Deliverance inspires a resurgence of interest in old time and American folk music, especially the banjo.
- Jimmy Cliff, one of the earliest Jamaican reggae singers to find success in the United States, reaches mainstream audiences with the movie The Harder They Come. The music from the movie spread awareness of Jamaican rock and reggae. Bob Marley's Catch a Fire also establishes his international career and sets the stage for becoming a major American rock icon.
- Myrrh Records becomes the first Christian rock record label.
- The earliest "rap musical events" are said to have been held in the Bronx.
- The first four-track tape recorder intended for nonprofessional use is released.
- "We Shall Overcome", a hymn-turned civil rights protest song becomes "a rallying cry, sung weekly at processions organized to mobilize the community in its fight against drugs".
- Elmhurst College inaugurates a nearly unique academic program, specializing in the music business.
- The Keystone Korner, one of the most important and longest-lasting jazz clubs in San Francisco, opens.

== 1973 ==
- The film American Graffiti is released. It is the "first Hollywood blockbuster about rock and roll".
- Augusto Pinochet's coup in Chile inspires musicians both in South America and the United States to form pan-Andean ensembles consisting of bombo drums, the quirqincho and charango guitars, the quena flute and the zampoña panpipes.
- Billboard coins the term disco to describe a genre; this year, Manu Dibango's "Soul Makossa" becomes the first disco hit.
- DJ Kool Herc, known as the "Father of Hip Hop", begins providing music for parties, going on to spur the development of hip hop music.
- A film version of The Fiddler on the Roof helps inspire a resurgence of interest in tradition Jewish music.
- Olivia Records, the first record label run entirely by women, is formed. The same year, the first women's music festival is held at Sacramento State University.
- One of the most successful groups to come out of the mid-20th century East Los Angeles music scene, Tierra, forms and records their first album, Tierra, an innovative work that fused elements of both Mexican and American popular music.
- The soundtrack to The Sting helps lead to a resurgence of interest in ragtime. This year will also see Gunther Schuller produce a performance of Scott Joplin's opera Treemonisha, and the following year will see Joshua Rifkin's three ragtime albums chart.

== 1974 ==
- Gloria Gaynor's "Never Can Say Goodbye" is the first "disco hit to reach the charts".
- The National Endowment for the Arts creates a subcategory within its music program for "Jazz/Folk/Ethnic Music"; though jazz had previously been supported by the NEA, this is the first support for folk music.
- The military establishes the Bicentennial Band, which will tour across the United States over the next few years in celebration of the country's bicentennial anniversary.
- The case Schroeder v. Macaulay is a key ruling on the enforceability of music publishing agreements. Among the consequences of the case is the reversion of unused material to the ownership of the author.

== 1975 ==
Mid-1970s music trends
- Asian-American composers of Western classical music, jazz and other styles begin developing a loose community, based in San Francisco. This is the basis of the avant-garde Asian American jazz scene, which incorporates Jeanne Aiko Mercer, Paul Yamazaki and Russel Baba.
- A revival of interest in the button box accordion begins among Slovenian Americans.
- A revival in New England–style contra dance spreads across the country.
- Dance music, disco, and dance halls regain mass popularity.
- All the major elements of hip hop culture: breakdancing, emceeing, DJing and graffiti, have fully developed.
- Ethnomusicological investigation into Jewish American music begins in earnest.
- Gospel group the Mighty Clouds of Joy's "Ride the Mighty High" becomes that group's biggest hit, and charts on both the disco and rock charts.
- Morris dancing groups in New England begin developing new tunes and dances, "ensuring a thriving creative pulse" in the scene.
- A jazz-salsa fusion scene develops, based in the New Rican Village Cultural Center in New York and including artists like Jerry Gonzalez, Manny Oquendo and Andy Gonzalez.

- Alex Haley's Roots is broadcast as a television miniseries, inspiring a rekindling of interest among African Americans of their traditional music and culture. It also helps to inspire similar roots revivals, a trend which will be intensified with the Bicentennial celebration the following year.
- Bruce Springsteen breaks into mainstream audiences with Born to Run, becoming "widely hailed as a rock and roll Messiah".
- Funk albums by Kool & the Gang (Spirit of the Boogie) and Earth, Wind & Fire (That's the Way of the World) are major successes on both the rhythm and blues and pop music charts.
- The exclusively female 14th Army Band begins integrating male members.
- John Williams' score for Jaws helps "revitalize the symphonic score, using existing practices and vocabularies".
- The rise of the Khmer Rouge in Cambodia leads to a wave of immigration to the United States, clustering in Lowell, Massachusetts and Long Beach, California, thus marking the beginning of a large Cambodian American musical tradition.
- Ned Buster holds the first traditional dance among the Ardmore Choctaw since 1937, then helps found the Choctaw-Chickasaw Heritage Committee to promote the long-dormant music, dance and other cultural heritage of the Choctaw and Chickasaw peoples.
- Parliament's Mothership Connection is a funk milestone, introducing "new approaches to varying moods, textures and timbres that symbolize... concepts of heterogeneity and spontaneity in black cultural expression".
- Pearl Williams-Jones begins her groundbreaking research on the "performance aesthetic" of Pentecostal Christian music.
- The Popovich Brothers are the subject of a film by Jill Godmilow, finding great fame for their style, based on the Serbo-Croatian tamburitza tradition.
- Punk is the first documented fanzine devoted to punk rock in the United States. Fanzines will soon become an integral part of the field of punk rock.
- The term salsas growing acceptance as music terminology is reflected by its use in the Latin New York Music Awards this year.
- Scott Joplin's Treemonisha is revived in its first "full-scale professional production", by the Houston Grand Opera and with an all-black cast and orchestration by Gunther Schuller, who also conducted.
- Thomas F. Johnston begins a series of publication over this and the next year, which are among the most extensive ethnomusicological research done in Alaska.
- Deejay Tom Moulton begins selling disco records in twelve-inch singles. The format is a "deejay-friendly medium that establish(es) the deejay" as a remixer who would rearrange, edit and then record dance music version for play in clubs.
- Van McCoy's "The Hustle" makes disco into a national trend.
- Vietnamese immigration to the United States decreases, and most Vietnamese American music into the 21st century draws entirely on the music of Vietnam as it was before this year, which marks the end of the Vietnam War. Many of the upland Vietnamese people, however, begin moving to the United States in this period, bringing with them a unique musical culture as they settled throughout the country, though especially in North Carolina. The end of the Vietnam War also leads to increased Thai, Cham, Lao and Hmong immigration to the United States.
- Walter Hawkins and his choir record Love Alive, a massively successful gospel record that will remain on the charts for three years.
- The Wiz, a retelling of The Wizard of Oz as musical theater with an all-black cast, is a groundbreaking, award-winning "smash hit" that presages a "resurgence of musical shows by blacks".
- Patti Smith's debut, Horses was the first album to come out of New York City punk rock scene.
- The duo of John McLaughlin and Zakir Hussain become one of the first duos to perform what will be known as fusion world music.
- RCA Records introduces the 12" vinyl single as a promotional tool aimed at DJs in dance clubs.

== 1976 ==
- Philip Glass' Einstein on the Beach opens at sold out shows at the Metropolitan Opera House, signifying newfound success for modern experimental music.
- The Bicentennial celebration helps inspire a resurgence of interest in traditional ethnic music, beginning with the Smithsonian's sponsorship of the Bicentennial Festival of American Folklife. Irish American groups at the festival are the first to be formally received by the Irish Embassy in the United States. The festival is a pivotal point in Irish American music history, offering the field what is viewed as its first official recognition and approval.
- Bill Conti's score for Rocky helps "revitalize the symphonic score, using existing practices and vocabularies".
- PBS first airs the series Dance in America.
- Will Ackerman and Anne Robinson found Windham Hill Records, one of the most prominent record labels in new-age music.
- The American Folklife Preservation Act is passed, establishing (among other things), the American Folklife Center of the Library of Congress, which works with a number of federal agencies, including the Smithsonian Institution and the Bureau of Indian Affairs.
- Afrika Bambaataa emerges as a major competitor to DJ Kool Herc, who had long been by far the single most prominent individual in hip hop culture.
- The Mexican American farmworker movement, which had long used music as a tool of communication, expression and organization, is buoyed by the release of ¡Huelga en general!, a collection of farmworker songs that had originally been produced by El Teatro Campesino. This year's ¡Si se puede!, with performances from a number of musicians, also inspires the Latino farmworkers in their struggles.
- The first woman begins serving as cantor in a Reform synagogue.
- The Son of Lion gamelan ensemble is founded in New York, becoming one of the first such permanent groups to use local instruments and commission new compositions. Founding members include Barbara Benary, Philip Corner and Daniel Goode.
- Stephen Sondheim's Pacific Overtures, libretto by John Weldman, is a groundbreaking musical that uses an entirely Asian cast and instruments.
- Tenor saxophonist Dexter Gordon performs in New York and New Orleans, inspiring a wave of interest in bebop, leading to a revival of that style.
- The National Endowment for the Arts makes field recordings of traditional Irish American musicians, the first such to be commercially released, on Rounder Records the following year.
- The first modern American klezmer band forms, and Irving Howe publishes World of Our Fathers an enormously successful and influential exploration of Eastern European Jewish culture.
- San Francisco's punk rock scene begins.
- Geoffrey Stokes' Star-Making Machinery is a seminal academic work, one of the first to examine the marketing and creation of a pop group.
- The synclavier is the first portable electronic and digital keyboard intended for home consumers.

== 1977 ==
- Elvis Presley dies, leading to a period of national mourning. About 80,000 people attend a public viewing of his casket in Graceland.
- Erwin Helfer coaxes blues singer Mama Yancey out of retirement.
- The film and soundtrack Saturday Night Fever with songs by The Bee Gees helps fuel the popularity of disco and inspires a string of similar energetic, dance-focused films. The success of the album also re-establishes the soundtrack as a tool in promoting both music and films.
- John Williams' score for Star Wars helps "revitalize the symphonic score, using existing practices and vocabularies".
- The Voyager 1 spacecraft is set to include recordings of music, featuring ancient chants, Beethoven, Bach and Blind Willie Johnson's "Dark Was the Night, Cold Was the Ground".
- The Smithsonian Institution creates the Office of Folklife Programs, later the Center for Folklife Programs and Cultural Studies, to conduct and publish research.
- John LaMonte's House of Sounds is searched by the FBI resulting in the largest counterfeit recording bust in American history.
- Deejay Frankie Knuckles begins working at the Warehouse, which is the origin of house music.
- Leanne Hinton's dissertation, on Havasupai songs, contains an extensive description of that tribe's use of vocables, and is a notable early study of their use in Native American music.
- The International Academy of Jazz Hall of Fame, hosted at the William Pitt Student Union in the University of Pittsburgh, opens. It is the oldest jazz hall of fame.
- The first wave of American punk rock begins in Southern California, based in Hollywood, with bands like X, the Germs, The Weirdos, The Urinals and The Screamers. The Germs become an especially noted forerunner of hardcore punk. This same year, the first Washington, D.C. punk band, White Boy, forms as well.
- Tipitina, a music venue in New Orleans, opens. It will be the only large music performance venue in the city until the mid-1990s.
- Will Ackerman founds Windham Hill, the most influential record label in new-age music.

== 1978 ==
Late 1970s music trends
- Slam dancing in mosh pits comes to the United States from the British punk scene.
- Disco loses its mainstream popularity, with many music fans growing increasingly antagonistic towards the entire genre.
- Minimalism comes to dominate most American concert music.
- Support for music education in public schools begins to decline.
- Though British punk bands would receive international attention first, American punk rock begins, with groups like The Ramones and Dead Kennedys.
- A new style of Irish American music is popularized by the Clancy Brothers and Tommy Makem, characterized by a single lead vocalist with a widely varying instrumental backing band, often with elements of traditional Irish sean-nós vocal ornamentation.
- Irish American rock bands create a new style called Celtic rock, based on rock music with the addition of the fiddle or other Irish instruments and with strong influences from Irish folk music.
- Irish American music festivals are established in Virginia (Washington Irish Folk Festival), New York City (Irish Traditional Music Festival), Philadelphia (Irish Music Festival) and Milwaukee (Milwaukee Irish Music Festival).
- A revival of Jewish American klezmer music begins.
- A number of religious Jewish rock operas are composed and performed, most famously including Sol Zim's David Superstar.
- The field of popular music studies – the academic study of popular music – begins to achieve mainstream scholarly acceptance as a valid area of research.

- Charley Rappaport, Stephen M. Wolownik and Lynn Carpenter form the Balalaika and Domra Association of America, which brings together many of the Russian balalaika orchestras across the country, and serves as a "clearinghouse for importing Russian instruments, books, and music".
- Erno Rapee's Encyclopedia of Music for Pictures is published, "to provide ideas for music appropriate to a scene" in a movie.
- Don Cornelius' Soul Train, an African American counterpart to American Bandstand, first airs.
- The emcee begins to replace the DJ as the most prominent performer in hip hop.
- Simon Frith and Angela McRobbie are the first academic researchers to study the perceived inherent masculinity of rock music, concluding that it is a product of socialization early in life, in which females are encouraged to be passive and submissive, qualities antithetical to much rock music.
- Sony introduces the Walkman, a portable cassette player that contributes greatly to the success of that format for recorded music.
- Martin Scorsese's documentary of The Band, Last Waltz, pioneers a new style of concert film, presenting a more naturalistic image than the larger-than-life atmosphere of most earlier concert films.
- Middle Class releases Out of Vogue, the first West Coast hardcore punk recording.
- The North American Basque Organization begins sponsoring a summer camp to help keep alive the musical and other cultural traditions of Basque Americans.
- The Tyagaraja Festival in Cleveland is founded, by members of the Faith United Church of Christ, to protect and promote Carnatic music, becoming the largest music festival of its kind outside India, and the first such festival in the United States.
- Kent State University establishes one of the first Thai musical ensembles in the United States.
- Sound Explosion becomes the first Filipino American mobile DJing group, which will soon become a major phenomenon in the San Francisco area.
- The Apple II's alphaSyntauri music system is the first "low-cost professionally usable computer music system".

== 1979 ==
- Blondie becomes the first band to release a video album with Eat to the Beat.
- The Broadway musical turned film Hair is released; the film's soundtrack is a highly popular example of modern theater.
- A deejay, Steve Dahl, leads the disco demolition rally in Comiskey Park, a turning point in the backlash against disco.
- Paul Lansky's Six Fantasies on a Poem by Thomas Campion is an important composition that uses computer synthesis of sounds and human speech.
- The Federal Cylinder Project is created to rescue ethnographic records, most of them made under the Bureau of Ethnology and repatriate the recordings to their peoples of origin. It will be the "largest repatriation project undertaken by any world archive".
- "Rappers Delight" by the Sugarhill Gang becomes the first commercially released hip hop recording, coming quickly after the Fatback Band's "King Tim III", which contains a hip hop–style rapping section. It is released by Sugar Hill Records, which sold over 500,000 copies. Later that year, Joe Bataan's "Rap-O, Clap-O" is a minor in the United States but is the first international hip hop hit.
- The first large mariachi festival in the United States is held, the San Antonio International Mariachi Conference.
- John Storm Roberts publishes a book entitled The Latin Tinge: The Impact of Latin American Music on the United States, a landmark study of Latin music in the United States.
- The complex traditions of Cambodian court music, long exclusive to the royalty in that country, are democratized both in Cambodia and among Cambodian Americans, who come to see court music as a fundamental part of their cultural identity.
- The most successful American group playing Balinese music, Gamelan Sekar Jaya, is founded.
- The Iranian Revolution leads to an influx of immigrants from Iran, many of them trained in classical Persian music; their concentration in Los Angeles leads to that city becoming a center for Iranian music in the United States.
- The second wave of American punk rock begins in Southern California, based in Hollywood, eventually evolving into the style known as hardcore punk. The form is closely associated with slamdancing, apocryphally said to have been invented in this year by Mike Marine of Huntington Beach, California.
- Philip Tagg publishes an analysis of the theme song to Kojak, the first major semiologist study on popular music.
- After an effort led by Kenneth Gamble, President Jimmy Carter designates June National Black Music Month. Chuck Berry appears at the White House at the first official celebration of the month.
- The Walkman is introduced by Sony.

== 1980 ==
- The film Urban Cowboy helps inspire a resurgence in mainstream popularity for mainstream country music.
- The movie Fame features an influential soundtrack.
- Afrika Bambaataa's "Planet Rock", which uses a sample from Kraftwerk's "Trans-Europe Express", enlarges the audience for electro-funk and hip hop.
- Bad Brains releases "Pay to Cum", the first East Coast hardcore punk release. A compilation called Rodney on the ROQ is released with a copy of influential hardcore periodical Flipside, spawning a wave of hardcore-themed zenes like Berkeley, California's Maximum RockNRoll, San Jose, California's Ripper and New York's The Big Takeover.
- The band Blondie's "Rapture" is a major hip hop-influenced hit. For many white audiences, it is their first exposure to hip hop, and Deborah Harry's vocal work constitutes the first white person to rap on record.
- After the Mariel boatlift, Afro-Cubans begin arriving in the United States in larger numbers, bringing with them distinctive musical, especially religious, styles, techniques and instrumentation.
- John Donald Robb's Hispanic Folk Music of New Mexico and the Southwest: A Self-Portrait of a People is published, becoming the standard reference book on the subject; Robb's recordings are the base of the John Donald Robb Archive of Southwestern Folk Music at the University of New Mexico, which is the largest collection of Southwestern American folk music.
- John Lennon is murdered in New York, and his death is taken by many fans as a symbol of the end of the 1960s countercultural movement.
- Ruben Bladés' Siembra sets sales records for American salsa, and makes him one of the most enduring figures in the field.
- The first usage of the word hardcore to describe what will later be known as hardcore punk may come from an article in the San Francisco magazine Damaged.
- Alison Geldard conducts one of the first major studies of Indian American music.
- The University of California, Los Angeles establishes a Near East Ensemble to perform Middle Eastern music, under the direction of Ali Jihad Racy.
- Roland Corporation introduces the TR-808, an influential early drum machine.

Early 1980s music trends
- Music education curricula in the United States begin incorporating musical elements from diverse areas of both the country and the world.
- Americans become more interested in the music education of their children, especially after news of the "Mozart effect", in which children exposed to Western classical music are said to become more intelligent later in life, spreads across the country.
- The last documented use of Ghost Dance-derived songs ends, among the Naraya songs, sung by women for general well-being, of the Wind River Shoshone.
- Hardcore punk develops and spreads across the country.

== 1981 ==
- Vangelis' score for Chariots of Fire is an influential film composition, an early example to use "obviously synthesized sounds".
- James Cleveland becomes the first gospel singer with a star on the Hollywood Walk of Fame.
- The breakthrough release for the gospel dynasty the Winan family, Introducing the Winans, is released.
- MTV premiers, showing the first of its music videos, The Buggles' "Video Killed the Radio Star". The channel is intended both to appeal to a young demographic poorly served by existing channels as well as market and expose new acts to popular music audiences. MTV will go on to expose audiences to new music to the present, but will also be criticized for adversely affecting the quality of both recorded and live music. It will become the largest international media company presenting popular music through cable and satellite.
- The Texas Talent Musicians' Association establishes the Tejano Music Awards to encourage the Tejano music industry.
- Harsh restrictions on dissenters in Haiti leads to another wave of migration to the United States, especially artists in a field known as angaje, including Ti-Manno, Manno Charlemagne and Les Frères Parent.
- Minor Threat's "Straight Edge" inspires the straight edge movement within hardcore punk, while the Dead Kennedys' "Nazi Punks Fuck Off" is an influential tirade against the white racists who are becoming a substantial part of the hardcore scene in some areas. Black Flag records Damaged, one of the seminal hardcore records, and Fear's appearance on Saturday Night Live inspires and lends legitimacy to the burgeoning hardcore sound.
- Lilian Esop organizes the first Kannel Days festival to celebrate the Estonian American kannel. This same year also sees Gottlieb Peets begin manufacturing kannels, soon becoming one of the premier manufacturers in the country.
- The Asian American Jazz Festival is founded to promote the field of Asian American jazz.
- The American Gamelan Institute is established by Jody Diamond to document the American gamelan tradition.
- Teen Idles' Minor Disturbance becomes the first Washington, D.C. hardcore recording, and the first release by Dischord Records, while Al Barile becomes a punk after seeing a Minor Threat show; he will become the leader of the Boston hardcore scene and found SS Decontrol. The hardcore scene of New York, Florida, Madison, Seattle and Detroit also begin to coalesce in this year.
- The United Methodist Church publishes Songs of Zion, a "pioneering collection of hymns, spirituals, and gospel songs" as a supplement to the official church hymnal.
- The Army sets rules for when military band members are to abandon their musical missions for more important purposes.

== 1982 ==
- Michael Jackson's Thriller becomes the biggest-selling album in history.
- Jacob Druckman produces a concert series with the New York Philharmonic, which helps the fledgling neoromantic movement gain momentum.
- Andrew Lloyd Webber's Cats is one of the most "important musicals" of the 1980s, and surpasses A Chorus Line as the longest-running show on Broadway.
- Afrika Bambaataa & the Soulsonic Force add synthesizers and electronic instruments to hip hop, defining the hip hop sound of the 1980s.
- The first official hymnal of Church of God in Christ is published, Yes Lord! The Church of God in Christ Hymnal.
- Grandmaster Flash & the Furious Five's "The Message" is the first hip hop recording to focus on the harsh realities of ghetto Life.
- The National Endowment for the Arts begins giving out National Heritage Awards; the first winners include the Seattle sean-nós singer Joe Feeney.
- The Misfits' Walk Among Us is their best-selling album, and they soon become one of the most nationally known bands of the hardcore punk movement.
- The compact disc (CD) is introduced jointly by Sony and Philips; the format will soon become the dominant medium for popular music sale.

== 1983 ==
- The movie Flashdance features a massively popular soundtrack that used unfamiliar, synthesized sounds. Paramount's music trailers for the film are the first such advertisements for a movie.
- Philip Glass' Koyaanisqatsi is an influential avant-garde film and score.
- The movie The Big Chill establishes a trend of using preexisting songs that give a sense of time, identity and place for the movie; this becomes standard practice.
- Gospel at Colonus is a successful Off-Broadway musica; that helps establish the modern career of the Blind Boys of Alabama.
- George Winston becomes the first new-age music star with his recordings Winter into Spring and Autumn, December.
- The success of Michael Jackson's Thriller signifies an end to the first major recession for the music industry since the late 1940s. It is the "best-selling album in pop-music history" at the time.
- The Grammy Awards expands its Latin awards to include Tropical, Latin Pop and Mexican American.
- A resurgence of interest in traditional Norwegian music leads to the re-formation of the Hardanger Violinist Association of America.
- Run-D.M.C.'s "It's Like That" launches their career as the leading hip hop group of the decade. They will be the first rappers on MTV and American Bandstand.
- Yamaha introduces the DX7, the most successful synthesizer in the United States.
- Soft drink corporation Pepsi-Cola sponsors a Michael Jackson tour. The sponsorship is reported to have increased sales of Pepsi products by ten percent in cities where Jackson performed, and the success of the plan accelerates the corporate sponsorship of rock tours.

== 1984 ==
- The International Bluegrass Music Association is founded.
- Jan Hammer's "musical direction" for Miami Vice, a popular television show, and the success of the score for the film Against All Odds, released as Against All Odds, show a new acceptance for rock-based soundtracks.
- George Nierenberg's documentary Say Amen, Somebody re-establishes the reputation of pioneering gospel singers Delois Barrett Campbell, Billie Barrett and Rodessa Barrett, who become cult favorites.
- Run-D.M.C.'s Run-D.M.C. is the first hip hop album to go gold.
- The first New Mexican Hispano to receive the National Heritage Fellowship from the National Endowment for the Arts is Cleofes Vigil, a well-known performer of alabados and other styles of indigenous New Mexican music.
- Joyce Hakala founds Koivun Kaiku, the first Finnish kantele band in the United States.
- The Army creates a new position at Fort Benjamin Harrison, Indiana, to lead all Army bands.
- The Dove Awards for Christian music and the Stellar Gospel Music Awards are first instituted.

== 1985 ==
Mid-1980s music trends
- The new traditionalist style of Randy Travis heralds the beginning of a new form of popular country music.
- Asian American jazz, using traditional elements of East and Southeast Asian cultures, spreads from San Francisco to include a host of composers, including Miya Masaoka, Kenny Endo, Glenn Horiuchi, Mark Izu, Fred Ho and Jon Jang.
- A number of female hip hop performers begin releasing "answer songs", which respond to popular recordings by male acts. The most well-known is Roxanne Shante, whose "Roxanne's Revenge" is a response to 1984's "Roxanne, Roxanne" by U.T.F.O.
- Hip hop culture comes to be strongly influenced by Jamaican dancehall.
- A number of Chinese composers in the xin chao (new tide) tradition come to the United States, establishing newfound interest in Chinese music among American composers; these immigrants include Tan Dun, Bright Sheng, Chen Yi and Zhou Long.
- An audience for the soundtracks to pornographic films develops, and nightclubs built around this music appear, most famously Leigh Bowery's Taboo.

- Tipper Gore forms the Parents Music Resource Center to combat misogyny in heavy metal and other undesirable traits in popular music. The Center is said to have been formed in direct response to a mother's concern over her daughter listening to Prince's "Darling Nikki", which is about female masturbation.
- The Federal Cylinder Project begins repatriating many of the recordings catalogued and preserved since its inception in 1979, presenting them to their communities of origin.
- FinnFestUSA is first held; the festival, which promotes Finnish-American music and culture, will become a "primary vehicle for the rejuvenation of Finnish American identity", particularly among second generation and beyond communities.
- Anthony Davis' X, The Life and Times of Malcolm X debuts at the American Music Theater Festival, performed by the New York City Opera. This is the first "avant-garde opera written by a black composer".
- Stevie Ray Vaughan's Texas Flood helps inspire a wave of interest among white listeners for rural African American blues styles.
- The Revolution Summer transforms the Washington, D.C. hardcore punk scene into a more melodic, mid-tempo and less aggressive style, an important part of the origin of emo. The New York hardcore community begins changing as well, evolving into a more aggressive style, associated with right-wing politics.
- "We Are the World", written by Lionel Richie and Michael Jackson, constitutes the beginning of charity rock in the United States.
- People v. Manning results in the New York Transit Authority lifting its ban on musical performances in New York's subway system. Music-makers, buskers, continue to be ticketed, however, for "soliciting donations without permission".
- The Federal Communications Commission rules that station groups can own more than one FM and one AM radio station in the same market.
- MTV launches VH-1, a music channel intended for older audiences, playing a selection of light pop, soul and country.

== 1986 ==
- Steven Tyler and Joe Perry appeared on Run–D.M.C.'s cover of Aerosmith's "Walk This Way". It becomes the first big rap-rock crossover hit, reaching No. 4 on the Billboard Hot 100.
- Jonathan Demme's Something Wild features a score by avant-garde composers John Cale, Laurie Anderson and David Byrne.
- Fintan Vallely publishes the first instruction book for the traditional flute, Timber – The Flute Tutor.
- Paul Simon's Graceland features African performers, instrumentation and musical techniques, "almost singlehandedly (carving) out a space for African musicians in the European American mainstream", and inspiring "countless other musicians" in the emerging world music field. Simon was criticized for recording the album in violation of an international boycott of apartheid South Africa.
- Muriel Thayer Painter completes the most extensive documentation of the music, dance and other ceremonial aspects of culture of the Yaqui Native Americans of Arizona.
- Jello Biafra, frontman for the Dead Kennedys, is charged with distributing harmful materials to minors for a poster with interlocked male and female genitalia, a painting by H. R. Giger, included with the album Frankenchrist.
- The approximate beginning of new school hip hop, and the end of old school hip hop.
- Slovenian American polka legend Frankie Yankovic receives the first Grammy Award for polka.
- Robert Rodriguez' The Seven Deadly Sins is the first theatrical multimedia composition for a wind ensemble.
- The New Grove Dictionary of American Music is the first music encyclopedia that covers a wide range of popular music, along with folk and classical.
- The Rock and Roll Hall of Fame is founded.

== 1987 ==
- Asian Improv Records is founded, soon becoming one of the premier labels of the Asian American jazz movement.
- Cigarette company Benson & Hedges becomes the first major corporation to sponsor a tour of American jazz musicians.
- The premier of Nixon in China by John Coolidge Adams with librettist Alice Goodman and stage director Peter Sellars at the Houston Grand Opera establishes Adams' career and help introduce "contemporary issues into a traditional venue".
- The movie Dirty Dancing features a popular soundtrack.
- At a meeting of British music industry executives, the term world music is coined, leading to a vast expansion of non-Western music sections in record stores in Europe and North America.
- KMET in Los Angeles becomes KTWV, the first all new-age commercial radio station.
- Guns N' Roses' Appetite for Destruction marks the beginning of a new era in popular heavy metal. It is the second best-selling debut album of all time.
- Conservative Jewish synagogues begin certifying women as cantors, though they will not be allowed to join the Cantors Assembly until 1990.
- The first bootleg CD is made.
- The Smithsonian Institution acquires the catalogue of Folkways Records, committing to keeping all the more than two thousand recordings in print. The first director of the project, Anthony Seeger, commits to acquiring additional independent labels for the Institution.

== 1988 ==
Late 1980s music trends
- Worldbeat begins to have major impact on mainstream American popular music.
- East Los Angeles becomes home to bands like Los Rock Angels and the Alienz, who incorporate "Mexican and other Latino musical concepts in a basic rock and rhythm and blues format".
- A growing Dominican influence begins to have effects on the salsa music industry, while the most popular artists, like Eddie Santiago, Frankie Ruiz and Luis Enrique, create a soft, ballad-like style called salsa romantica.
- Chinese Americans begin to be attracted to karaoke in large numbers.
- Political and socially conscious hip hop begin to gain mainstream popularity.

- Andrew Lloyd Webber's Phantom of the Opera is one of the "most important" musicals of the 1980s.
- Billboard issues its first New Age chart.
- David Sanjek begins publishing the first comprehensive history of the American music industry.
- Jazz musician Wynton Marsalis becomes the artistic director of the Jazz at Lincoln Center program, later organizing an influential orchestra and series of concerts.
- Public Enemy's It Takes a Nation of Millions to Hold Us Back establishes their style and message, advancing the "cause of black nationalism and Afrocentricity".
- Salt-N-Pepa's debut Hot, Cool & Vicious goes double-platinum, leading to hip hop record labels scouting female acts for the first time.
- The first hip hop Grammy Award is given out.
- Linda Ronstadt's Canciones de Mi Padre is an unprecedented mainstream success for recorded mariachi music.
- Henry Louis Gates' The Signifyin' Monkey is a seminal work on signifying, an African American verbal folk practice that influenced hip hop.
- Tiny Morrie's "No Hay Amor" is the first song recorded by an American in the Spanish language to top the Mexican charts.
- Kunqu, a form of Chinese opera, is first established in the United States with the formation of the Kunqu Society in New York.
- A number of Buddhist Vietnamese monks, from various temples throughout California, come together for the largest-scale performance of their chanting tradition outside of Vietnam.
- The success of MC Hammer's Let's Get It Started makes him the first hip hop "superstar".
- Two controversial album covers are not sold in many stores: Jane's Addiction's Nothing's Shocking and Prince's Lovesexy.
- New York's cabaret laws, which have restricted musical performances in the city since 1926, are repealed.
- Bad Religion's Suffer is released, with many claiming it is one of the most important punk rock albums of all time.

== 1989 ==
- A number of Tibetan expatriates form Chaksam-pa, the Tibetan Dance and Opera Company.
- The United States-Canada Trade Agreement spurs arguments between the two countries regarding economics of cultural products, with many on both sides fighting for the "exclusion of cultural industries from trade liberalization".
- MTV's Yo! MTV Raps debuts; the show will lead to many hip hop artists finding new audiences.
- The Pacific Islander Festival is established in Los Angeles, inspiring other music festivals that bring together Hawaiians, Samoans and other Polynesian Americans.
- 2 Live Crew's As Nasty as They Wanna Be is accused of obscenity, resulting in a legal battle that gained national attention. N.W.A.'s "Fuck Tha Police" similarly becomes the target of protest from law enforcement officers.
- The simultaneous release of an international Pepsi advertising campaign with the "Like a Prayer" single by Madonna is perhaps the most successful and most-hyped tie-in of a popular song in an advertising campaign.
- The United States becomes a signatory to the Berne Convention, an international agreement on copyright.
- Major record companies, fearing a rise in home taping reducing sales, refuse to license recorded music for the new medium of digital audio tape until the Serial Copy Management System is invented to prevent more than one copy of a recording and additional copies of the single allowed copy.
- The first compact disc jukebox is introduced.
- Milli Vanilli wins the Grammy Award for Best New Artist, even as a Rolling Stone poll of rock critics results in the group being voted the worst new band of the year. After it is revealed that members of the group did not sing on the hit songs, Milli Vanilli becomes the first performers to return their Grammy.

== 1990 ==
Early 1990s music trends
- Led by Nirvana, Seattle's grunge scene becomes a national phenomenon.
- A number of alternative rock bands from the Champaign-Urbana, Illinois area sign to major labels, or major indie labels, including Hum and Poster Children.
- West Coast hip hop, specifically Snoop Doggy Dogg and Dr. Dre, begins outselling East Coast hip hop, the first time New York had not been the undisputed king of the genre.
- A number of films document life in the African American neighborhoods where gangsta rap was evolving; these include New Jack City and Boyz n the Hood, which feature the acting and music of Ice-T and Ice Cube, respectively.
- The Mexican tradition of banda, specifically in the style of Sinaloa, becomes a suddenly major part of the Mexican American music industry, as KLAX, a Los Angeles radio station switches to airing banda exclusively and becomes highest rated station in Los Angeles.
- A fusion of rock, reggae, rara and other Haitian music, known as mizik rasin comes to prominence with the great success of Boukman Eksperyans.
- Riot grrl, a form of alternative rock performed by all-women bands and closely associated with feminism, spreads, beginning in Olympia, Washington and Washington, D.C.

- The Immigration Act of 1990 makes it much more difficult for entertainers and artists to secure visas for entering the United States.
- The Native American Graves Protection and Repatriation Act (NAGPRA) is passed, allowing indigenous Americans to claim ancestral remains and funerary accoutrements, including musical instruments.
- MC Hammer's Please Hammer Don't Hurt 'Em becomes the best-selling hip hop album in history.
- Kid Frost, a longtime part of the hip hop music scene, releases Hispanic Causing Panic, which precedes releases by A Lighter Shade of Brown, Cypress Hill, and others, establishing a market for Latino hip hop.
- The Tahiti Fete, an annual dance competition, is established in San Jose, the first such event to have actual Tahitian judges.
- Richard Spottswood publishes a discography of "ethnic music", the first such publication to seek systematic coverage of an area of music.
- D. W. Krummel and Stanley Sadie publish Music Printing and Publishing, the definitive academic study on the history of music printing and publishing.
- The music television channel VH1 is launched, aimed at older audiences, compared to MTV, and with an album-oriented rock policy.

== 1991 ==
- Amy Grant, the best-selling Christian rock performer of the time, releases her biggest crossover success, "Baby Baby".
- Billboard changes its data-gathering techniques used in compiling album charts, to rely on information supplied by research firm SoundScan. The new data reveals that the commercial success of hard rock, hip hop, classic rock and country music had been underestimated.
- Scott Johnson's How It Happens, an avant-garde piece of electronic music, uses the voice of I. F. Stone, backed by a string quartet.
- Mickey Hart's Planet Drum becomes the first winner of the Grammy Award for Best World Music Album.
- A group of female punk artists known as Riot Grrrls emerge.
- Spirit Horses, an influential flute-orchestral concerto and a collaboration between Native American flute performer R. Carlos Nakai and composer James DeMars.
- The first Yue opera company, Shao-Xing Opera Association of New York, in the United States is founded in New York City.
- A Tribe Called Quest, one of the earliest jazz hip hop fusionists, become the first hip hop group to collaborate with a live musician, Ron Carter, on an album, The Low End Theory.

== 1992 ==
- Philip Glass' Symphony No. 2 "combines the melodic, harmonic, and rhythmic hallmarks of his work in a more comprehensive, symphonic-style discourse than he (had) attempted before".
- The song "Cop Killer" by Body Count, fronted by Ice-T, becomes the subject of national controversy and is pulled from the album by Warner Brothers, due to concerns that the song promotes the murder of police.
- The Audio Home Recording Act places a levy on digital media, such as CDs, that can be used to make recordings of copyrighted music without the permission of the copyright owner.
- Awadagin Pratt wins the Walter W. Naumburg International Piano Competition, the first African American to do so.
- Branford Marsalis reaches an African American music milestone when he is appointed bandleader for The Tonight Show, the first black musician to occupy a "major spot on mainstream nighttime television".
- Ron Nelson's Passacaglia (Homage on B.A.C.H.) is the most award-winning composition for wind band in American history, winning the Barlow, American Bandmasters Association and NBA awards.
- A collection of essays, entitled The Adoring Audience: Fan Culture and Popular Media, is the beginning of serious scholarly research on "fandom", or the phenomenon of people being "fans" of a particular performer, group or genre.
- The digital compact cassette is introduced by Philips and Matsushita, but it is expensive and, despite superior sound quality, the format does not succeed. The minidisc is introduced by Sony, but fails to catch on in the United States.
- The first House of Blues restaurant and club opens in Boston, founded by Isaac Tigrett.

== 1993 ==
- The debate over authorship of the patriotic song "Dixie" continues, with a claim made for the song being plagiarized from an African American family named the Snowdens, from Knox County, Ohio.
- Kirk Franklin's "Why We Sing", from the album Kirk Franklin & the Family, becomes a popular music phenemonen.
- Gloria Estefan's Mi Terra becomes an unprecedented success, and establishes a wave of Latin pop in the United States.
- Shaquille O'Neal, a well-known basketball player, begins his music career. He will be the most commercially successful athlete to have a long-term musical career.
- The case ZTT Records v. Holly Johnson is a key ruling on the enforceability of recording contracts, involving Holly Johnson of Frankie Goes to Hollywood.

== 1994 ==
- MuchUSA, the American branch of Canadian music television giant CHUM/Citytv, is created.
- The banning of Country Music Television by the Radio-Television Telecommunication Commission in favor of the Canadian Country Network nearly precipitates a trade war between the United States and Canada.
- Rough Guides, a music publishing company, releases World Music: The Rough Guide, the most comprehensive reference source for world music.
- Research by Beverly Diamond, M. Sam Cronk and Franziska von Rosen constitutes the first major musicological study of the instrumentation of an entire Native American music area, the Northeast.
- The first large kate, a traditional Cham celebration featuring music and dance, in the United States is held in San Jose.
- The Brooklyn Museum begins hosting an annual week-long festival, Mahrajan al-Fan, of Arab music and culture, led by Simon Shaheen.
- Kurt Cobain's suicide is taken by many of his fans and media figures as an endpoint to the "slacker" culture that Cobain's band, Nirvana, and style of music, grunge, had symbolized.
- The case of Campbell v. Acuff-Rose Music, Inc. – over the use of Roy Orbison's "Oh, Pretty Woman" in a song by 2 Live Crew – marks a change in direction by American courts in allowing the parodic fair use of copyrighted material in commercial works.
- The Big Easy Social and Pleasure Club is founded by Tom McLendon in Houston, Texas, soon becoming the "most reliable and accessible" blues venue in the city.

== 1995 ==
Mid-1990s music trends
- Bands like The Offspring and Green Day create a mainstream-friendly style of pop punk.
- Bands like the Kottonmouth Kings, Limp Bizkit and Korn begin using heavy metal in a popular style of rap rock.

- Royal Hartigan, who developed a drum set that could be used with Ghanaian rhythmic techniques, publishes West African Rhythms for the Drum Set, which "presents a detailed exposition of cross-cultural performance and a breakthrough method that shows a new way of playing the drum set by incorporating traditional Ghanaian rhythmic forms".
- The Potawatomi Nation of Wisconsin fund the Milwaukee Ballet Company's performance of Dream Dances, a reclamation of the Potawatomi music found in Otto Luening's Potawatomi's Legends.
- The Lincoln Center for the Performing Arts establishes a "jazz department on equal terms with opera and symphony orchestra".
- Television channel M2 is formed to replicate the constant music video playing associated with the beginning of MTV.

== 1996 ==
- The first Free Tibet Concert is held in San Francisco; the event will be a seminal musical and political event in the coming years.
- Funding for the National Endowment for the Arts is cut by forty percent, leading the elimination of the music program.
- George Walker becomes the first African American to win the Pulitzer Prize in music, fir Lilacs, a symphonic work based on a Walt Whitman poem.
- The theatrical show 'Bring in 'da Noise/Bring in 'da Funk is an innovative piece that creates rhythmic counterpoint using "pots, pans, and bucketsm as well as with the usual tap shoes", "electrifying audiences".
- Itzhak Perlman begins recording klezmer, bring the genre to new audiences in the United States and abroad.
- The Telecommunications Act of 1996 removes all restrictions on radio station ownership.
- An international copyright treaty amends the Berne Convention, extending protection to the Internet.

== 1997 ==
- The DVD format, primarily intended for videos, is released, with seven times the capacity of the compact disc.
- The Pulitzer Prize for music is given to a jazz composition for the first time; it is Wynton Marsalis' Blood on the Fields.
- The University of Iowa returns many Native American objects of cultural importance to their respective tribes, include a number of musical instruments, returned to the Seneca Nations.
- Magdalen Hsu-Li becomes among the first Chinese American singer songwriters, and among the first to become a major figure in alternative rock with the release of her debut album, Muscle and Bone.

== 1998 ==
Late 1990s music trends
- Live musical instruments again become common parts of recorded hip hop.

- The Sonny Bono Copyright Term extension Act extends the length of copyright by twenty years.
- Frankie Knuckles becomes the first deejay to win the Grammy Award for Best Remixer.
- Lauryn Hill's The Miseducation of Lauryn Hill and Missy Elliott's Supa Dupa Fly are popular releases, and are pivotal recordings for women in hip hop.
- R. L. Burnside's Come on In is a landmark recording that uses elements of hip hop, such as scratching, in a rural blues style.
- The soundtrack to Yellow, a film by Chris Chan Lee, is the first to feature only musicians of Asian descent.
- Grammy Awards launches the first award for dance music, the Grammy Award for Best Dance Record.

== 1999 ==
- Kongar-ol Ondar's Back Tuva Future features Ondar, a Tuvan popular enough in his homeland to be compared to Elvis Presley, and contributions from country star Willie Nelson and physicist Richard Feynman; the album uses Tuvan folk melodies and throat-singing with modern American popular music.
- Daron Hagen composes Bandanna, a retelling of Othello with a Mexican American setting, the first full opera for wind ensemble.
- An attempt at a second Woodstock festival fails, and is perceived as succumbing to greed and poor planning. It ends in a frenzy of rape, theft, arson and looting.

== 2000 ==
- The Grammy Awards designate seven awards for Latin music: Tejano Performance, Latin Pop Performance, Latin Rock/Alternative Performance, Mexican-American Performance, Salse Performance, Merengue Performance and Traditional Tropical Latin Performance. The Latin Grammys are also founded to focus specifically on rewarding Latin music in the United States.
- The O Brother Where Art Thou? is a surprise success, consisting of old time music, which provokes a resurgence of interest in American folk music.
- Napster is convicted of violating copyright law for enabling people to trade files without permission from the owner of the copyrights in the file.
