= Massachusetts Magazine =

Monthly periodical (Boston, Mass. : Isaiah Thomas and Co., 1789-1796.)

Massachusetts Magazine (sometimes appearing with a definite article as The Massachusetts Magazine) was the name of two magazines published in the U.S. state of Massachusetts. The earlier magazine was published in Boston during 1789–1796. The later magazine was published in Salem during 1908–1918.

== Late 18th century publication ==
The Massachusetts Magazine was published in Boston, Massachusetts, from 1789 through 1796. Also called the Monthly Museum of Knowledge and Rational Entertainment, it specialized in "poetry, music, biography, history, physics, geography, morality, criticism, philosophy, mathematics, agriculture, architecture, chemistry, novels, tales, romances, translations, news, marriages, deaths, meteorological observations, etc. etc." It was intended as "a kind of thermometer, by which the genius, taste, literature, history, politics, arts, manners, amusements and improvements of the age and nation, may be ascertained."

Founded by Isaiah Thomas, the magazine was also published by Ebenezer T. Andrews (1789–1793), Ezra W. Weld (1794), Samuel Hill (1794), William Greenough (1794–1795), Alexander Martin (1795–1796), Benjamin Sweetser (1796), and James Cutler (1796). It was edited by Isaiah Thomas, Thaddeus Mason Harris (1795–1796), and William Bigelow (1796). Contributors included Joseph Dennie (as Socialis), William Dunlap, Benjamin Franklin, Sarah Wentworth Morton (as Philenia), Judith Sargent Murray (as Constantia), and Christian Gullager. Sheet music, 45 pieces in total, was published with some issues, including compositions by Hans Gram, William Selby, Samuel Holyoke, and Elias Mann. The music also included a small number of popular songs by English composers James Hook, Samuel Arnold, and William Shield.

== Early 20th century publication ==
The Massachusetts Magazine was published in Salem, Massachusetts, from 1908 through early 1918. The periodical was founded by Frank A. Gardner, M.D., Charles A. Flagg (of the Library of Congress), and Albert W. Dennis. The editor was Rev. Thomas Franklin Waters, the noted researcher and author of Ipswich, Massachusetts. With a quarterly publishing schedule, the magazine was "devoted to History, Genealogy, and Biography."

A regular theme dealt with "Pilgrims and Planters" written by Lucie M. Gardner. Also, the magazine included research papers. An example is articles in the regimental history series, such as "Col. John Glover's Marblehead Regiment" (author, Dr. F.A. Gardner) that is found in Vol. I, No. 1. Gardner did a series of these "monographs" with the 25th of the series appearing in Vol. XI, No. 1 (January, 1918). In Vol. VIII, No.1, the theme was celebrating the centennial year (post the closing of the War of 1812) starting with an essay by John Davis Long (32nd Governor of Massachusetts) and others.

The series on Regimental History used those units present at the Siege of Boston. In the first five volumes, additional material related to participation by Massachusetts appeared in a series, Department of the American Revolution.

Other advisory editors included Thomas Wentworth Higginson, John M. McClintock (publisher of The New England Magazine), and George Sheldon.

The Essex Antiquarian (Sidney Perley) reported this about The Massachusetts Magazine: "This magazine is intended to be the official organ of several of the colonial societies."

Volume VI, No. 4, pages 159–190, provided a serial addition from F. M. Thompson who described vigilante activity in Montana from a first-hand view. One incident involved Henry Plummer and his gang of ruffians who were hanged. Thompson returned to Massachusetts and was a judge in Greenfield. This portion of the magazine was taken by Montana as the content for the book A Tenderfoot in Montana in 2004.
