= John Aitken (music publisher) =

Scottish-American music publisher

- Born: c. 1745; Dalkeith, Edinburghshire, Scotland
- Died: September 8, 1831 (aged 85–86); Philadelphia, Pennsylvania, U.S.
- Burial place: Christ Church Cemetery, Philadelphia
- Occupation: Publisher
- Known for: First American publisher of secular music
- Spouse: Elizabeth Aitken

John Aitken (c. 1745 – September 8, 1831) was a Scottish-American music publisher. For a period of over six years, he was the only publisher of sheet music in the United States and may have been the first American publisher of secular music as well.

== History ==
=== Early life ===
Aitken was born in Dalkeith, Scotland around 1745. In October 1771, he arrived in Philadelphia via Rotterdam and became an indentured servant to goldsmith William Taylor for one-and-a-half years. By 1780, he had become a taxpaying property owner of Philadelphia, and had begun selling his services as a silversmith. The Philadelphia Museum of Art houses two of his creations, a teaspoon and a creamer.

In the mid-1780s, he married Elizabeth, with whom he had several children. The Aitkens were good friends with innkeeper James Oeller and his wife; the Oellers served as godparents to the Aitken children. Although Aitken was buried in an Episcopal cemetery, he took an active part in Philadelphia's Catholic community as a member of Old St. Mary's in the 1780s and 1790s—he served as godparents to several of the parish's children, regularly donated to the church, and rented a pew there.

=== Music publishing ===
Aitken appears to have started his music publishing career in 1787, producing three works. Three Rondos for piano by William Brown was announced in the pages of the Pennsylvania Packet on January 23, 1787. Aitken's second project may have been Alexander Reinagle's A Selection of the Most Favorite Scots Tunes. Reinagle was a fellow Scottish immigrant, arriving in Philadelphia in 1786. He may have been influential in Aitken's decision to use the "punch" engraving process for sheet music; Aitken was the first to do so in the United States.

His final work in 1787 was his own A Compilation of the Litanies and Vespers Hymns and Anthems as They Are Sung in the Catholic Church, the first American collection of Catholic music. Although there is scholarly debate as to whether the work, which spans 136 pages, is representative of actual Catholic musical practice in post-revolutionary America, Reverend John Carroll approved its publication—his signature, along with those of three Philadelphian priests, appears in an approbation preceding the title page, which endorsed "an undertaking so conducive to the Decency and Solemnity of Religious Worship".

From 1787 to 1793, Aitken was the only publisher of sheet music in the United States, publishing at least 20 works, many of which were by Reinagle. Between 1793 and 1806, he only published two works: a collection entitled Scots Musical Museum (1797) and "The Goldsmith's Rant" (1802). The latter, a song that he composed, consisted of a single page of sheet music. An advertisement touting Aitken's services as a goldsmith and jeweler appeared on the back of the page.

In 1807, Aitken returned to regularly publishing music, opening a shop on North Second Street. He expanded his publications to secular works, and he may have been the earliest American publisher of secular music. He printed some 125 works from 1807 to 1811. Although he ceased publishing music in 1811, he continued working in the printing trade until 1825. After his death in 1831, he was buried in the cemetery of Christ Church.
