= William Tuckey =

William Tuckey (1708 in Somersetshire, England – September 14, 1781) was an American composer, who exerted important influence on the musical life of the Colonial United States. He was one of the first American composers to gain notability, and was also a choir master and organist. Tuckey debuted Handel's Messiah in the Americas for the first time in 1770.

== Life ==
Before moving to New York, Tuckey was a Frenchman who had been Lay Clerk of the Bristol Cathedral, and clerk of the Parish. He emigrated to New York City in 1753. Upon arrival to New York, he was appointed a clerk of Trinity Church. He then convinced the vestry of Trinity that music should be taught to the students of the charity school, which had been established in 1739 by the church. In this way, he acquired a choir to sing for him in services. He also continued composing. Despite his efforts to establish regular choral singing in America, the time was not ripe for his labors.

== Works ==
Though the only surviving works of Tuckey are those in psalm collections, his music was well known in his time. Through advertisements for subscriptions, it can be known what Tuckey wrote:

1st- An Hymn (by was of an anthem) consisting of Solos, Duets, one Trio and Chorus; together with a Psalm Tune, adapted for any charitable church collection. 2nd- A performance adapted for a funeral, consisting of three Dirges (for chorus), the words part of the burial service; together with an Anthem and a Psalm Tune suitable on the solemnity of a funeral or interment of any person of note, etc. The whole never yet perform'd being very lately set to music by William Tuckey

— In the New York Mercury of March 11, 1771

Tuckey also wrote an anthem called Thanksgiving Anthem, which was sung for Jeffery Amherst in 1760, upon his return to New York after the Conquest of Canada. He wrote another anthem called Anthem from the 97th Psalm, which was later known as Liverpool, and anonymously included in James Lyon's Urania, a collection of psalm tunes. Tuckey also may have written a piece called Ode on Masonry.
