= Samuel Adams Holyoke =

Samuel Adams Holyoke (15 October 1762 – 7 February 1820) was an American composer and teacher of vocal and instrumental music.

== Biography ==
Holyoke was the son of Rev. Elizur Holyoke and Hannah Peabody. He was born 15 October 1762 in Boxford, Massachusetts, and died 7 February 1820 in Concord, New Hampshire. He was a Congregationalist and a Mason, and never married.

After preparatory training at Phillips Academy, Andover, Holyoke matriculated at Harvard College in 1786. The source of his musical training is unknown, but he was composing music before he graduated from Harvard in 1789. In 1789–1790, he contributed four secular compositions to Isaiah Thomas's Massachusetts Magazine. A prolific composer, he composed some 700 pieces, including psalm tunes and anthems and occasional pieces, some with instrumental accompaniment.

In 1793, Holyoke helped to found Groton Academy in Groton, Massachusetts, where he served as the first headmaster. In 1809–1810 Holyoke served as music instructor at Phillips Academy.

== Legacy ==
After his death, his music was largely forgotten. His importance to American music was summed up by music historian George Hood: "There was no man of his day that did more for the cause of music than Samuel Holyoke."

== Published works ==
- Harmonia Americana (Boston, 1791)
- The Massachusetts Compiler (Boston, 1795, with Oliver Holden and Hans Gram)
- "Exeter: for Thanksgiving" (Exeter, NH, 1798)
- "Hark from the Tombs" and "Beneath the Honors" (Exeter, NH, 1800, in honor of George Washington)
- The Instrumental Assistant (Exeter, NH, 1800)
- A Dedication Service (Exeter, NH, 1801)
- Occasional Music (Exeter, NH, 1802)
- The Columbian Repository (Exeter, NH, 1803)
- Masonic Music (Exeter, NH, 1803)
- A Dedication Service (Salem, MA, 1804; different music from the 1801 publication)
- The Christian Harmonist (Salem, MA, 1804)
- The Occasional Companion, nos. 1–7 (Exeter, NH, Dedham, MA, and Boston, 1806-after 1810)
- The Instrumental Assistant II (Exeter, NH, 1807)
- The Vocal Companion (Exeter, NH, 1807)

== Bibliography ==
- Eskew, Harry, and Karl Kroeger (ed), Samuel Holyoke and Jacob Kimball: Selected Works (New York, 1998).
- Metcalf, Frank J., American Writers and Compilers of Sacred Music (New York, 1925), 114–120.
- Nichols, Andrew, "Genealogy of the Holyoke Family", Historical Collections of the Essex Institute 3 (1861): 57–61.
- Perley, Sidney, The History of Boxford, Essex County, Massachusetts (Boxford, MA, 1880.)
- Willhide, J. Lawrence, "Samuel Holyoke: American Music Educator" (PhD diss., University of Southern California, 1954).
