= Hail, Columbia =

American patriotic song

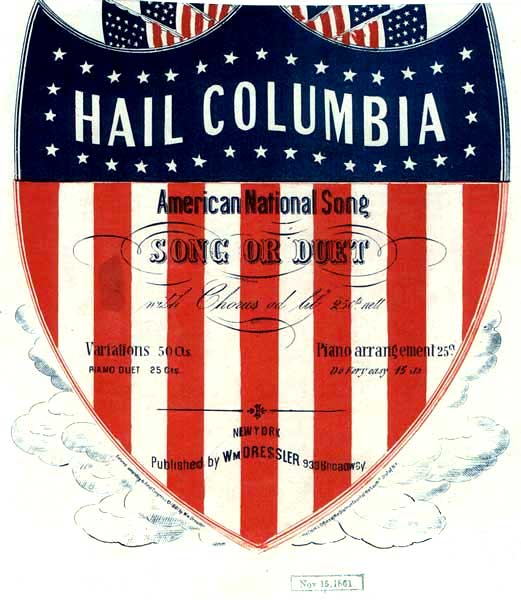
- Cover of an 1861 sheet music for "Hail, Columbia"
- Personal anthem of the vice president of the United States: Unofficial anthem of the United States; (1789–1931)
- Also known as: "The President's March"
- Lyrics: Joseph Hopkinson, 1798
- Music: Philip Phile, 1789
- Adopted: 1789 (de facto)
- Relinquished: March 3, 1931
- Succeeded by: "The Star-Spangled Banner" (as national anthem)

Audio sample
- "Hail, Columbia", preceded by four ruffles and flourishes (as would be played for the U.S. vice president), performed instrumentally by the United States Navy Band's ceremonial band: file; help

"Hail, Columbia" is an American patriotic song and ceremonial entrance march of the vice president of the United States. It was originally considered to be one of the unofficial national anthems of the United States until 1931, when "The Star-Spangled Banner" was named as the official national anthem. Columbia is the name for the national personification of the United States which originated during the 18th century.

== History ==
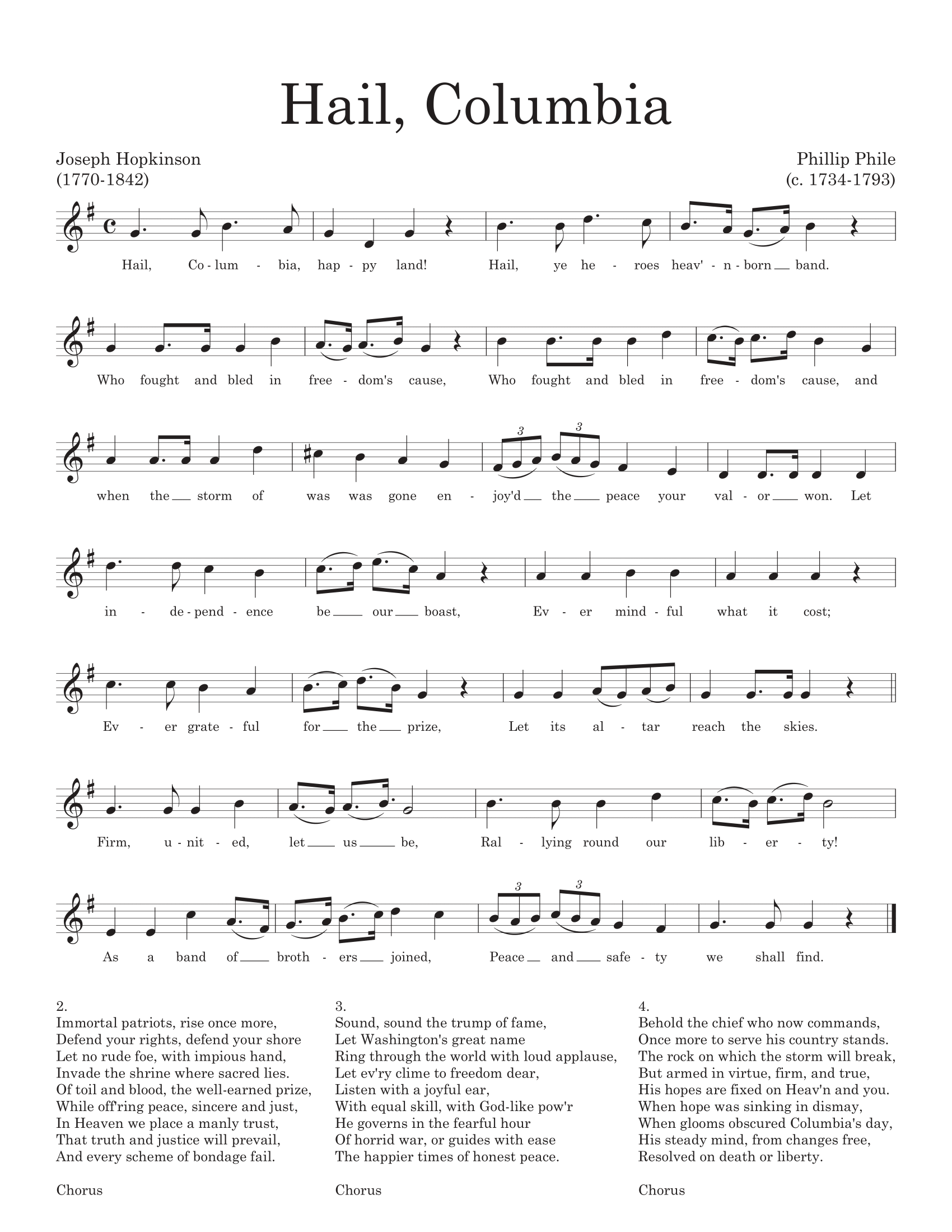
Modernized sheet music arrangement

The music was composed by Philip Phile in 1790 for the first inauguration of George Washington and titled "The President's March". It became the song "Hail, Columbia" when arranged with lyrics by Joseph Hopkinson in 1798. The song gained popularity during the XYZ Affair and subsequent Quasi-War with France. The song was used in the United States as a de facto national anthem throughout the 19th century. However, the song lost popularity after World War I and was replaced by "The Star-Spangled Banner" in 1931.

It was the personal anthem for the president, until it was replaced by the song "Hail to the Chief", and it is now the official vice president's personal anthem. The song is always preceded by four ruffles and flourishes when introducing the vice president. It has also been used as a slow march during military ceremonies, often while the band countermarches. It is played at inauguration ceremonies upon the arrival of the incumbent vice president (if newly re-elected), and immediately after the vice president takes their oath of office. There have, however, been exceptional circumstances where "Hail, Columbia" was played for an outgoing vice president, such as at the Inauguration of Joe Biden in 2021, when the outgoing President Donald Trump did not attend the inaugural ceremonies. As such, where at the inauguration of their successors the outgoing president and vice president conventionally arrive together accompanied by "Hail to the Chief", outgoing Vice President Mike Pence was introduced along with his wife, Second Lady Karen Pence accompanied by "Hail, Columbia".

== Lyrics ==
1. Hail Columbia, happy land!
Hail, ye heroes, heav’n-born band,
Who fought and bled in freedom’s cause,
Who fought and bled in freedom’s cause,
And when the storm of war was gone
Enjoy’d the peace your valor won.
Let independence be our boast,
Ever mindful what it cost;
Ever grateful for the prize,
Let its altar reach the skies.

Chorus
Firm, united let us be,
Rallying round our liberty,
As a band of brothers joined,
Peace and safety we shall find.

2. Immortal patriots, rise once more,
Defend your rights, defend your shore!
Let no rude foe, with impious hand,
Let no rude foe, with impious hand,
Invade the shrine where sacred lies
Of toil and blood, the well-earned prize,
While off’ring peace, sincere and just,
In Heaven’s we place a manly trust,
That truth and justice will prevail,
And every scheme of bondage fail.

Chorus
Firm, united let us be,
Rallying round our liberty,
As a band of brothers joined,
Peace and safety we shall find.

3. Behold the chief who now commands,
Once more to serve his country stands.
The rock on which the storm will break,
The rock on which the storm will break,
But armed in virtue, firm, and true,
His hopes are fixed on Heav’n and you.
When hope was sinking in dismay,
When glooms obscured Columbia’s day,
His steady mind, from changes free,
Resolved on death or liberty.

Chorus
Firm, united let us be,
Rallying round our liberty,
As a band of brothers joined,
Peace and safety we shall find.

4. Sound, sound the trump of fame,
Let Washington’s great name
Ring through the world with loud applause,
Ring through the world with loud applause,
Let ev’ry clime to freedom dear,
Listen with a joyful ear,
With equal skill, with God-like pow’r
He governs in the fearful hour
Of horrid war, or guides with ease
The happier time of honest peace.

Chorus
Firm, united let us be,
Rallying round our liberty,
As a band of brothers joined,
Peace and safety we shall find.

== See also ==
- "Hail, America"
- United States military music customs
