= Philip Phile =

German-American composer

Four ruffles and flourishes, and "Hail, Columbia"
"Hail, Columbia", preceded by four ruffles and flourishes as played for the Vice President, performed by the United States Navy Band Ceremonial Band

Philip Phile (German: Pfeil) (c. 1734–1793) was a German-American composer and violinist. His year of birth is uncertain, but believed to be approximately 1734. His works include a lost Violin Concerto (1787), but he is best known for "The President's March", written and performed at the inauguration of President George Washington in 1789.

Joseph Hopkinson arranged the piece with lyrics and titled it "Hail Columbia". It was first performed by at the Chestnut Street Theatre on April 25, 1798. It is best known under this title and was once a strong candidate for U.S. national anthem, though today it has, unlike other candidates, such as "America the Beautiful", been largely forgotten, although it continues to appear in films set in the United States during the nineteenth century.
