= Hans Gram (composer) =

Hans Gram (1754-1804) was a Danish composer and musician who emigrated to the United States in the early 1780s. In Boston, Massachusetts, he served as organist of the Brattle Street Church, and as a music teacher. He lived in Charlestown; and in Boston on Belknap's Lane and Common Street. His music "was performed at the funeral of John Hancock." He died in Boston in 1804. In 1810 a "Hans Gram Musical Society" formed in Fryeburg, Maine.

== Works ==
- Death Song of a Cherokee Indian. 1791
- (Compositions published in Massachusetts Magazine, ca.1791)
- Sacred Lines, for Thanksgiving Day
- Bind Kings with Chains, an anthem for Easter Sunday
- Hans Gram (1795), The Massachusetts compiler of theoretical and practical elements of sacred vocal music, together with a musical dictionary and a variety of psalm tunes, chorusses, &c., chiefly selected or adapted from modern European publications, Boston: Printed by Isaiah Thomas and Ebenezer T. Andrews, OL 18824084M (Compiled and edited by Hans Gram, Samuel Holyoke and Oliver Holden).
- Hymn to Sleep. (Gram translated lyrics from German and added his verses)
