= Music history of the United States in the 1960s =

Overview of US music in the 1960s

Popular music of the United States in the 1960s became innately tied up into causes, opposing certain ideas, influenced by the sexual revolution, feminism, Black Power and environmentalism. This trend took place in a tumultuous period of massive public, unrest in the United States which consisted of the Cold War, Vietnam War, and Civil Rights Movement.

Central to this trend was a folk roots revival that inspired a wave of similar trends across Europe and the rest of the world. This stemmed from a revival of hillbilly music early in the decade, and drew on Appalachian folk-pop pioneers The Weavers. Singer-songwriters like Bob Dylan and Joan Baez broke new ground in lyrical approach and personal style in composition, setting the stage for the next wave of lighter, country music and rhythm and blues-influenced singer-songwriters like James Taylor, Elton John, Carole King, and Cat Stevens, who began topping the charts in the very early 1970s.

The 1960s began with soul music topping the charts, including pure soul divas and singers specializing in the new, rhythm and blues-gospel music fusion with a secular approach. Later specialties in soul cropped up, including girl groups, blue-eyed soul, brown-eyed soul, Memphis soul, Philly soul and, most popular, Motown. The last part of the decade saw soul singer-songwriters like Marvin Gaye invent album-oriented soul, and James Brown and his ever-evolving backing band invent funk.

Modern music in the 1960s was dominated by the Nashville sound until Merle Haggard changed the national country sound to the Bakersfield sound. For a time, the Bakersfield sound was the only homegrown music that could compete in sales against an influx of British bands; this was called the British Invasion, and it sparked a new wave of music and social activism. Psychedelic rock arose from this subculture, which opposed the Vietnam War and supported civil rights and other generally leftist causes. While the energy in this scene remained strong for some time, it soon splintered into competing heavy metal, early art-punk rock and progressive rock.

== Folk music ==
These performers and several others were instrumental in launching the folk music revival of the 1950s and 1960s.

- The Kingston Trio
- The Weavers
- Pete Seeger
- Woody Guthrie
- Odetta
- Peter, Paul and Mary
- Joan Baez
- Bob Dylan
- Judy Collins
- Leonard Cohen
- Joni Mitchell
- Carolyn Hester
- Phil Ochs
- Tom Paxton
- Buffy Sainte-Marie
- Dave Van Ronk
- Tom Rush
- Fred Neil
- Gordon Lightfoot
- Ian and Sylvia
- Arlo Guthrie
- The Brothers Four
- The Limeliters

== Rock ==
=== Folk rock ===
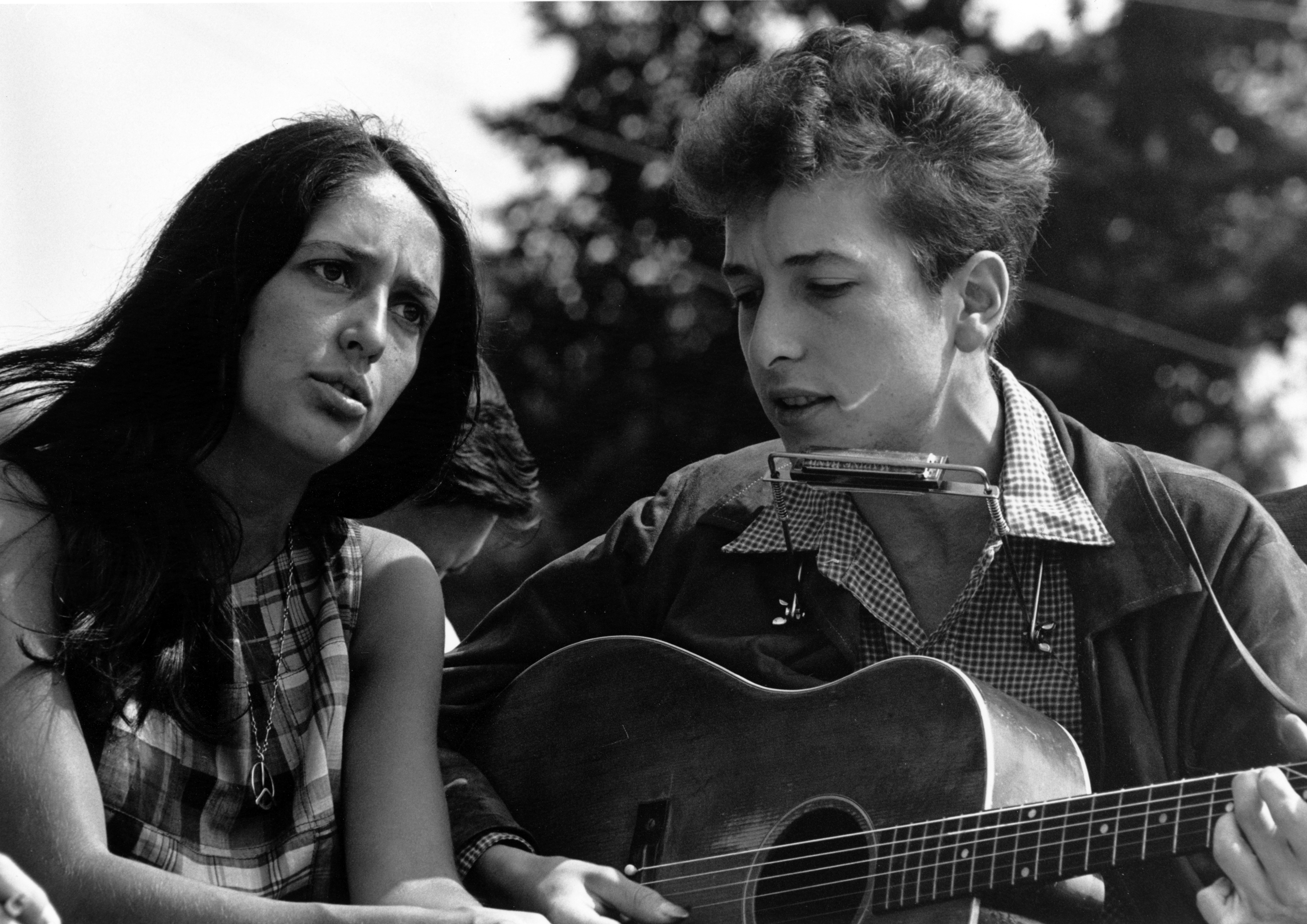
Bob Dylan and Joan Baez during the civil rights "March on Washington", August 28, 1963

By the 1960s, the scene that had developed out of the American folk music revival had grown to a major movement, using traditional music and new compositions in a traditional style, usually on acoustic instruments. In America the genre was pioneered by figures such as Woody Guthrie and Pete Seeger and often identified with progressive or labor politics. In the early sixties figures such as Joan Baez and Bob Dylan had come to the fore in this movement as singer-songwriters. Dylan had begun to reach a mainstream audience with hits including "Blowin' in the Wind" (1963) and "Masters of War" (1963), which brought "protest songs" to a wider public, but, although beginning to influence each other, rock and folk music had remained largely separate genres, often with mutually exclusive audiences.

Early attempts to combine elements of folk and rock included the Animals "House of the Rising Sun" (1964), which was the first commercially successful folk song to be recorded with rock and roll instrumentation. The folk rock movement is usually thought to have taken off with The Byrds' recording of Dylan's "Mr. Tambourine Man" which topped the charts in 1965. With members who had been part of the café-based folk scene in Los Angeles, the Byrds adopted rock instrumentation, including drums and 12-string Rickenbacker guitars, which were initially seen by the band, being used in The Beatles film, A Hard Day's Night (film) which became a major element in the sound of the genre. Later that year Dylan adopted electric instruments, much to the outrage of many folk purists, with his "Like a Rolling Stone" becoming a US hit single. Folk rock particularly took off in California, where it led acts like The Mamas & the Papas and Crosby, Stills and Nash to move to electric instrumentation, and in New York, where it spawned performers including The Lovin' Spoonful and Simon and Garfunkel, with the latter's acoustic "The Sounds of Silence" being remixed with rock instruments to be the first of many hits.

Folk rock reached its peak of commercial popularity in the period 1967–8, before many acts moved off in a variety of directions, including Dylan and the Byrds, who began to develop country rock. However, the hybridization of folk and rock has been seen as having a major influence on the development of rock music, bringing in elements of psychedelia, and helping to develop the ideas of the singer-songwriter, the protest song and concepts of "authenticity".

=== Psychedelic rock ===
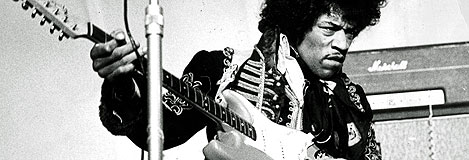
Jimi Hendrix, 1967

Psychedelic music's LSD-inspired vibe began in the folk scene, with the New York-based Holy Modal Rounders using the term in their 1964 recording of "Hesitation Blues". The first group to advertise themselves as psychedelic rock were the 13th Floor Elevators from Texas, at the end of 1965; producing an album that made their direction clear, with The Psychedelic Sounds of the 13th Floor Elevators the following year.

Psychedelic rock particularly took off in California's emerging music scene as groups followed the Byrds from folk to folk rock from 1965. The psychedelic life style had already developed in San Francisco and particularly prominent products of the scene were The Grateful Dead, Country Joe and the Fish, The Great Society and Jefferson Airplane. The Byrds rapidly progressed from purely folk rock in 1966 with their single "Eight Miles High", perceived by many listeners to be a reference to drug use. In actuality, it referred to The Byrds' 1965 plane trip to England.

Psychedelic rock reached its apogee in the last years of the decade. In America the Summer of Love was prefaced by the Human Be-In event and reached its peak at the Monterey Pop Festival, the later helping to make major American stars of Jimi Hendrix and The Who, whose single "I Can See for Miles" delved into psychedelic territory. Key recordings included Jefferson Airplane's Surrealistic Pillow and The Doors' Strange Days. These trends climaxed in the 1969 Woodstock festival, which saw performances by most of the major psychedelic acts, but by the end of the decade psychedelic rock was in retreat. The Jimi Hendrix Experience broke up before the end of the decade and many surviving acts, moved away from psychedelia into more back-to-basics "roots rock", the wider experimentation of progressive rock, or riff laden heavy rock.

=== Surf rock ===
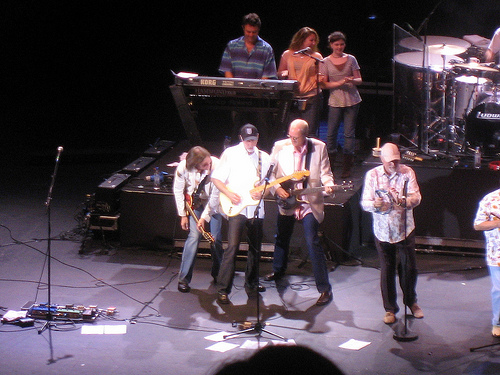
The Beach Boys, 2008

In the early 1960s, one of the most popular forms of rock and roll was Surf Rock, which was characterized by being nearly entirely instrumental and by heavy use of reverb on the guitars. The spring reverb featured in Fender amplifiers of the day, cranked to its maximum volume, produced a guitar tone shimmering with sustain and evoking surf and ocean imagery.

Duane Eddy's "Movin' and Groovin" is thought by many to be the main contender for laying the groundwork as the first surf rock record, while others claim the genre was invented by Dick Dale on "Let's Go Trippin'", which became a hit throughout California. Most early surf bands were formed during this decade in the Southern California area. By the mid-1960s The Beach Boys, who used complex pop harmonies over a basic surf rock rhythm, had emerged as the dominant surf group and helped popularize the genre. In addition, bands such as The Ventures, The Shadows, The Atlantics, The Surfaris and The Champs were also among the most popular Surf Rock bands of the decade.

=== Garage rock ===
Garage rock was a form of amateurish rock music, particularly prevalent in North America in the mid-1960s and so called because of the perception that it was rehearsed in a suburban family garage. Garage rock songs revolved around the traumas of high school life, with songs about "lying girls" being particularly common. The lyrics and delivery were notably more aggressive than was common at the time, often with growled or shouted vocals that dissolved into incoherent screaming. They ranged from crude one-chord music (like the Seeds) to near-studio musician quality (including the Knickerbockers, the Remains, and the Fifth Estate). There were also regional variations in many parts of the country with flourishing scenes particularly in California and Texas. The Pacific Northwest states of Washington and Oregon had perhaps the most defined regional sound.

The style had been evolving from regional scenes as early as 1958. "Louie Louie" by The Kingsmen (1963) is a mainstream example of the genre in its formative stages. By 1963, garage band singles were creeping into the national charts in greater numbers, including Paul Revere and the Raiders (Boise), the Trashmen (Minneapolis) and the Rivieras (South Bend, Indiana). In this early period many bands were heavily influenced by surf rock and there was a cross-pollination between garage rock and frat rock, sometimes viewed as merely a subgenre of garage rock.

The British Invasion of 1964–66 greatly influenced garage bands, providing them with a national audience, leading many (often surf or hot rod groups) to adopt a British Invasion lilt, and encouraging many more groups to form. Thousands of garage bands were extant in the US and Canada during the era and hundreds produced regional hits. Despite scores of bands being signed to major or large regional labels, most were commercial failures. It is generally agreed that garage rock peaked both commercially and artistically around 1966. By 1968 the style largely disappeared from the national charts and at the local level as amateur musicians faced college, work or the draft. New styles had evolved to replace garage rock (including blues rock, progressive rock and country rock). In Detroit garage rock stayed alive until the early 70s, with bands like the MC5 and The Stooges, who employed a much more aggressive style. These bands began to be labelled punk rock and are now often seen as proto-punk or proto-hard rock.

=== Blues rock ===
Blues rock had been pioneered in the early 1960s by American singer-guitarist Lonnie Mack, but the genre didn't take off in the U.S. until the mid-1960s, when American bands began to develop a sound similar to British blues and blues-rock musicians. Key acts included Paul Butterfield (whose band, like Mayall's Bluesbreakers in Britain, served as a starting point for many successful musicians), Canned Heat, the early Jefferson Airplane, Janis Joplin, Johnny Winter, The J. Geils Band and Jimi Hendrix with his power trios, The Jimi Hendrix Experience and Band of Gypsys, whose guitar virtuosity and showmanship would be among the most emulated of the decade. Blues rock bands like Allman Brothers Band, Lynyrd Skynyrd and eventually ZZ Top from the southern states, incorporated country elements into their style to produce distinctive Southern rock.

=== Roots rock ===
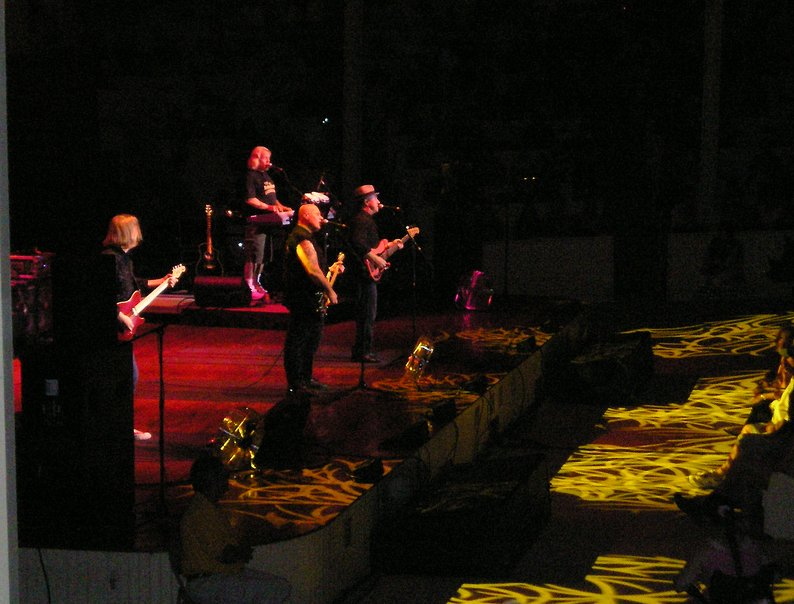
Creedence Clearwater Revival, 2009

Roots rock is the term now used to describe a move away from the excesses of the psychedelic scene, to a more basic form of rock and roll that incorporated its original influences, particularly country and folk music, leading to the creation of country rock and Southern rock. In 1966 Bob Dylan spearheaded the movement when he went to Nashville to record the album Blonde on Blonde. This, and subsequent more clearly country-influenced albums, have been seen as creating the genre of country folk, a route pursued by a number of, largely acoustic, folk musicians. Other acts that followed the back-to-basics trend were the Canadian group The Band and the Californian-based Creedence Clearwater Revival, both of which mixed basic rock and roll with folk, country and blues, to be among the most successful and influential bands of the late 1960s. The same movement saw the beginning of the recording careers of Californian solo artists like Ry Cooder, Bonnie Raitt and Lowell George, and influenced the work of established performers such as the Rolling Stones' Beggar's Banquet (1968) and the Beatles' Let It Be (1970).

In 1968 Gram Parsons recorded Safe at Home with the International Submarine Band, arguably the first true country rock album. Later that year he joined the Byrds for Sweetheart of the Rodeo (1968), generally considered one of the most influential recordings in the genre. The Byrds continued in the same vein, but Parsons left to be joined by another ex-Byrds member Chris Hillman in forming The Flying Burrito Brothers who helped establish the respectability and parameters of the genre, before Parsons departed to pursue a solo career. Country rock was particularly popular in the Californian music scene, where it was adopted by bands including Hearts and Flowers, Poco and Riders of the Purple Sage, the Beau Brummels and the Nitty Gritty Dirt Band. A number of performers also enjoyed a renaissance by adopting country sounds, including: the Everly Brothers; one-time teen idol Ricky Nelson who became the frontman for the Stone Canyon Band; former Monkee Mike Nesmith who formed the First National Band; and Neil Young. The Dillards were, unusually, a country act, who moved towards rock music. The greatest commercial success for country rock came in the 1970s, with artist including the Doobie Brothers, Emmylou Harris, Linda Ronstadt and the Eagles (made up of members of the Burritos, Poco and Stone Canyon Band), who emerged as one of the most successful rock acts of all time, producing albums that included Hotel California (1976).

The founders of Southern rock are usually thought to be the Allman Brothers Band, who developed a distinctive sound, largely derived from blues rock, but incorporating elements of boogie, soul, and country in the early 1970s. The most successful act to follow them were Lynyrd Skynyrd, who helped establish the "Good ol' boy" image of the subgenre and the general shape of 1970s guitar rock. Their successors included the fusion/progressive instrumentalists Dixie Dregs, the more country-influenced Outlaws, jazz-leaning Wet Willie and (incorporating elements of R&B and gospel) the Ozark Mountain Daredevils. After the loss of original members of the Allmans and Lynyrd Skynyrd, the genre began to fade in popularity in the late 1970s, but was sustained the 1980s with acts like .38 Special, Molly Hatchet and The Marshall Tucker Band.

=== Progressive rock ===
Progressive rock, sometimes used interchangeably with art rock, was an attempt to move beyond established musical formulas by experimenting with different instruments, song types, and forms. From the mid-1960s The Left Banke, The Beatles, The Rolling Stones and The Beach Boys, had pioneered the inclusion of harpsichords, wind and string sections on their recordings to produce a form of Baroque rock and can be heard in singles like Procol Harum's "A Whiter Shade of Pale" (1967), with its Bach inspired introduction. The Moody Blues used a full orchestra on their album Days of Future Passed (1967) and subsequently created orchestral sounds with synthesisers. Classical orchestration, keyboards and synthesisers were a frequent edition to the established rock format of guitars, bass and drums in subsequent progressive rock.

Instrumentals were common, while songs with lyrics were sometimes conceptual, abstract, or based in fantasy and science fiction. The Pretty Things' SF Sorrow (1968) and The Who's Tommy (1969) introduced the format of rock operas and opened the door to "concept albums, usually telling an epic story or tackling a grand overarching theme." King Crimson's 1969 début album, In the Court of the Crimson King, which mixed powerful guitar riffs and mellotron, with jazz and symphonic music, is often taken as the key recording in progressive rock, helping the widespread adoption of the genre in the early 1970s among existing blues rock and psychedelic bands, as well as newly formed acts.

== Pop ==
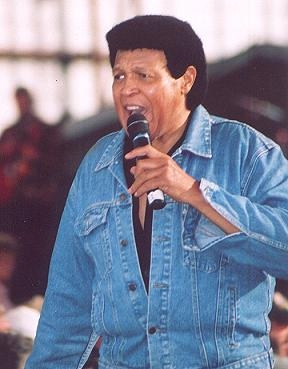
Chubby Checker performing in 2005

Chubby Checker during the early 1960s popularizes the enduring dance craze The Twist with his hit cover of Hank Ballard's R&B hit "The Twist".

Gerry Goffin and Carole King become a very influential duo in pop music, writing numerous number-one hits including the first song to ever reach number one by a girl group, The Shirelles "Will You Love Me Tomorrow" and the 1962 number one hit, "The Loco-Motion" which was performed by Little Eva.

"Sugar, Sugar" becomes a big hit for The Archies, defining the bubblegum pop genre.

== R&B and Soul ==
- Motown develops as a pop-influenced answer to soul music. The label begins a long run of No. 1 U.S. hit singles in 1961 with "Please Mr. Postman" by The Marvelettes. The label would have numerous No. 1 Billboard hits throughout the decade and into the 1990s.
- Soul music develops popularity throughout the decade, led by Ray Charles, Sam Cooke, James Brown, and Otis Redding, among many others.
- Funk begins later in the decade with James Brown and Sly & the Family Stone having early hits.
- You Keep Me Hanging On uses a fast tempo which would prove innovative in the development of disco music.
- Aretha Franklin's 1967 recordings, such as "I Never Loved a Man (The Way I Love You)", "Respect" (originally sung by Otis Redding), and "Do Right Woman-Do Right Man", are considered the apogee of the soul genre, and were among its most commercially successful productions.

== Country music ==
Triumph and great tragedy marked the 1960s in country music. The genre continued to gain national exposure through network television, with weekly series and awards programs gaining popularity. Sales of records continued to rise as new artists and trends came to the forefront. However, several top stars died under tragic circumstances, including several who were killed in plane crashes.

The predominant musical style during the decade was the Nashville Sound, a style that emphasized string sections, background vocals, crooning lead vocals and production styles seen in country music. The style had first become popular in the late 1950s, in response to the growing encroachment of rock and roll on the country genre, but saw its greatest success in the 1960s. Artists like Jim Reeves, Eddy Arnold, Ray Price, Patsy Cline, Floyd Cramer, Roger Miller, and many others achieved great success through songs such as "He'll Have to Go," "Danny Boy," "Make the World Go Away", "King of the Road", and "I Fall to Pieces." The country-pop style was also evident on the 1962 album Modern Sounds in Country and Western Music, recorded by rhythm and blues and soul singer Ray Charles. Charles recorded covers of traditional country, folk and classical music standards in pop, R&B and jazz styles. The album was hailed as a critical and commercial success, and would be vastly influential in later country music styles. Songs from the album that were released for commercial airplay and record sales included "I Can't Stop Loving You," "Born to Lose" and "You Don't Know Me."

By the end of the decade, the Nashville Sound became more polished and streamlined, and became known as "countrypolitan." Tammy Wynette, Glen Campbell, Dottie West and Charley Pride were among the top artists adopting this style. While George Jones — by the early 1960s one of country music's most consistent hitmakers – also recorded countrypolitan-styled music, his background remained honky tonk, many of his songs focusing on the themes of heartbreak and lonlieness. Also, Marty Robbins proved to be one of the genre's most diverse singers, singing a wide range of styles, including standard country, western, pop, blues, and Hawaiian.

Johnny Cash—who became known as "The Man in Black"—became of the most influential musicians of the 1960s (and eventually, 20th century). Although primarily recording country, his songs and sound spanned many other genres including rockabilly, blues, folk, and gospel. His music showed great compassion for minorities and others who were shunned by society, including prison inmates. Two of Cash's most successful albums were recorded live in prison: At Folsom Prison and At San Quentin.

During the latter half of the 1960s, Pride – a native of Sledge, Mississippi — became the first African-American superstar in country music, a genre virtually dominated by white artists. Some of his early hits, sang with a smooth baritone voice and in a style meshing honky-tonk and countrypolitan, included "Just Between You and Me," "The Easy Part's Over," "All I Have to Offer You (Is Me)" and a cover version of Hank Williams' "Kaw-Liga." Pride continued to be successful for more than 20 years, amassing an eventual 29 No. 1 hits on the Billboard Hot Country Singles chart.

A newly emerging style, which had its roots in the 1950s but exploded in the mainstream during the 1960s, was the "Bakersfield sound." Instead of creating a sound similar to mainstream pop music, the Bakersfield sound used honky tonk as its base and added electric instruments and a backbeat, plus stylistic elements borrowed from rock and roll. Buck Owens, Merle Haggard and Wynn Stewart were some of the top artists adopting this sound, and by the late 1960s they were among country music's top selling artists.

Dolly Parton, a native of the Smoky Mountains town of Locust Ridge, Tennessee, gained national exposure on the nationally syndicated program The Porter Wagoner Show. Her mountain-influenced, biographical brand of country and her down-home personality won many fans, and her star power would only begin to rise.

In addition to the syndicated The Porter Wagoner Show, several other television programs were produced to allow country music to reach a wider audience, such as The Jimmy Dean Show in med-decade. At the end of the decade, Hee Haw began a 23-year run, first on CBS and later in syndication; Hee Haw, hosted by Owens and Roy Clark was loosely based on the comedy series Rowan & Martin's Laugh In, and incorporated comedy along with performances by the show's cast or guest performers from the country music field. The Academy of Country Music and Country Music Association awards programs were telecast for the first time in the late 1960s.

The 1960s were marred with tragedy. Johnny Horton, who sang in the saga-song style, was killed in a car accident in 1960. A March 5, 1963, plane crash claimed the lives of Patsy Cline, Cowboy Copas and Hawkshaw Hawkins. Days later, Jack Anglin was killed in a car accident, while Texas Ruby died in a trailer fire in Texas. In July 1964, Jim Reeves lost his life while piloting a plane near Brentwood, Tennessee. Ira Louvin was killed in a car accident in 1965. Success overcame several of those tragic deaths, as both Cline and Reeves had many posthumous hits (with previously recorded songs issued after their deaths) and enjoyed strong followings for many years.

The 1960s began a trend toward a proliferation of No. 1 hits on the Billboard Hot Country Singles chart, thanks to ever-changing data collecting methods. When the 1960s decade opened, there were but four No. 1 songs topping the chart (five, if one counts Marty Robbins' "El Paso"), but by the mid-1960s, there were always at least a dozen songs topping the chart annually. In 1967, there were more than 20 songs reaching the top spot for the first time ever in a single calendar year ... and that number would only continue to rise during the next 20 years.

== Other trends ==
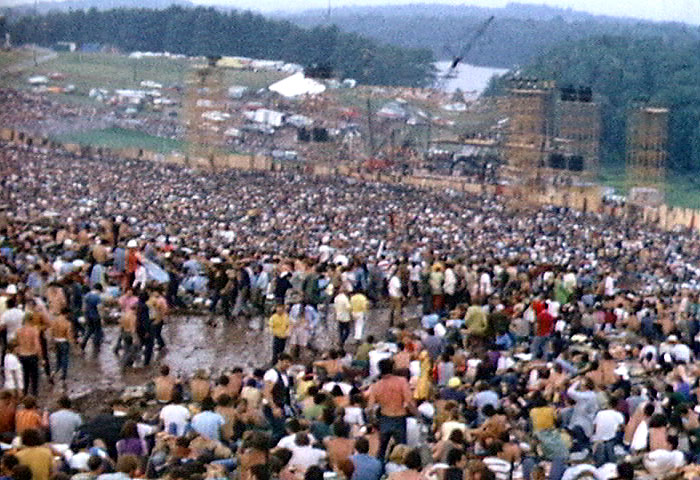
Woodstock Festival, 1969

- Large festivals taking place over several days, 1967's Monterey Pop Festival and 1969's Woodstock Music Festival would feature many popular rock musicians.
- Current events become a major influence on popular music. Many songs are written in protest to the Vietnam War. The song "Ohio" was written about the Kent State massacre, and became a hit for Crosby, Stills, Nash, and Young.
- World music sees a huge rise in popularity as many seek interest in other cultures. Ravi Shankar performs at the Monterey and Woodstock festivals. Latin Rock artist Carlos Santana sees popularity throughout the decade. George Harrison develops an interest in the Hare Krishna culture, adding Indian influence to The Beatles' music including the use of a sitar. Reggae begins to popularize at this time.
- In 1969, the Rolling Stones organized the ill-fated Altamont Free Concert.
- Songs like "Summertime Blues" and "Eve of Destruction" address the issue of the voting age, which at the time was 21. The issue was that soldiers were drafted at 18, but could not vote. The voting age was eventually lowered to eighteen.
- A few songs such as Bob Dylan's Blowin' in the Wind address the Civil Rights Movement.

== See also ==
- 1960s in music
