= History of music publishing =

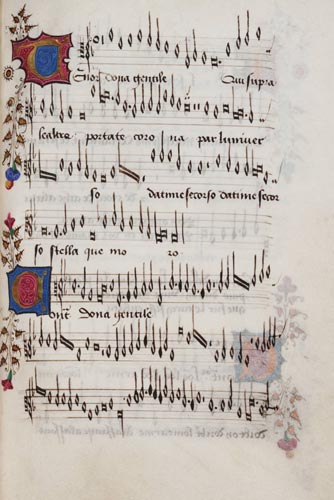
A handwritten page from the Mellon Chansonnier (c.1470), prepared for the wedding of Catherine of Aragon

Music publishing is the business of creating, producing and distributing printed musical scores, parts, and books in various types of music notation, while ensuring that the composer, songwriter and other creators receive credit and royalties or other payment (where applicable). This article outlines the early history of the industry.

== Printing ==
Music publishing did not begin on a large scale until the mid-15th century, when mechanical techniques for printing music were first developed. The earliest example, the Mainz Psalter, dates from 1457, and is the second book to be printed on the Gutenberg press (after the Gutenberg Bible). Prior to 1501, music books were owned by the wealthy or religious institutions, and music had to be learned by ear or copied out by hand. This was a very labor-intensive and time-consuming process, so it was first undertaken only by monks and priests seeking to preserve sacred music for the church. The few collections of secular music that are extant were commissioned and owned by wealthy noblemen. Examples include the Squarcialupi Codex of Italian Trecento music and the Chantilly Codex of French Ars subtilior music. Hand copying persisted long after the invention of printing and music was widely disseminated in manuscript form well into the 18th century, both in personal copying and scribal publication.

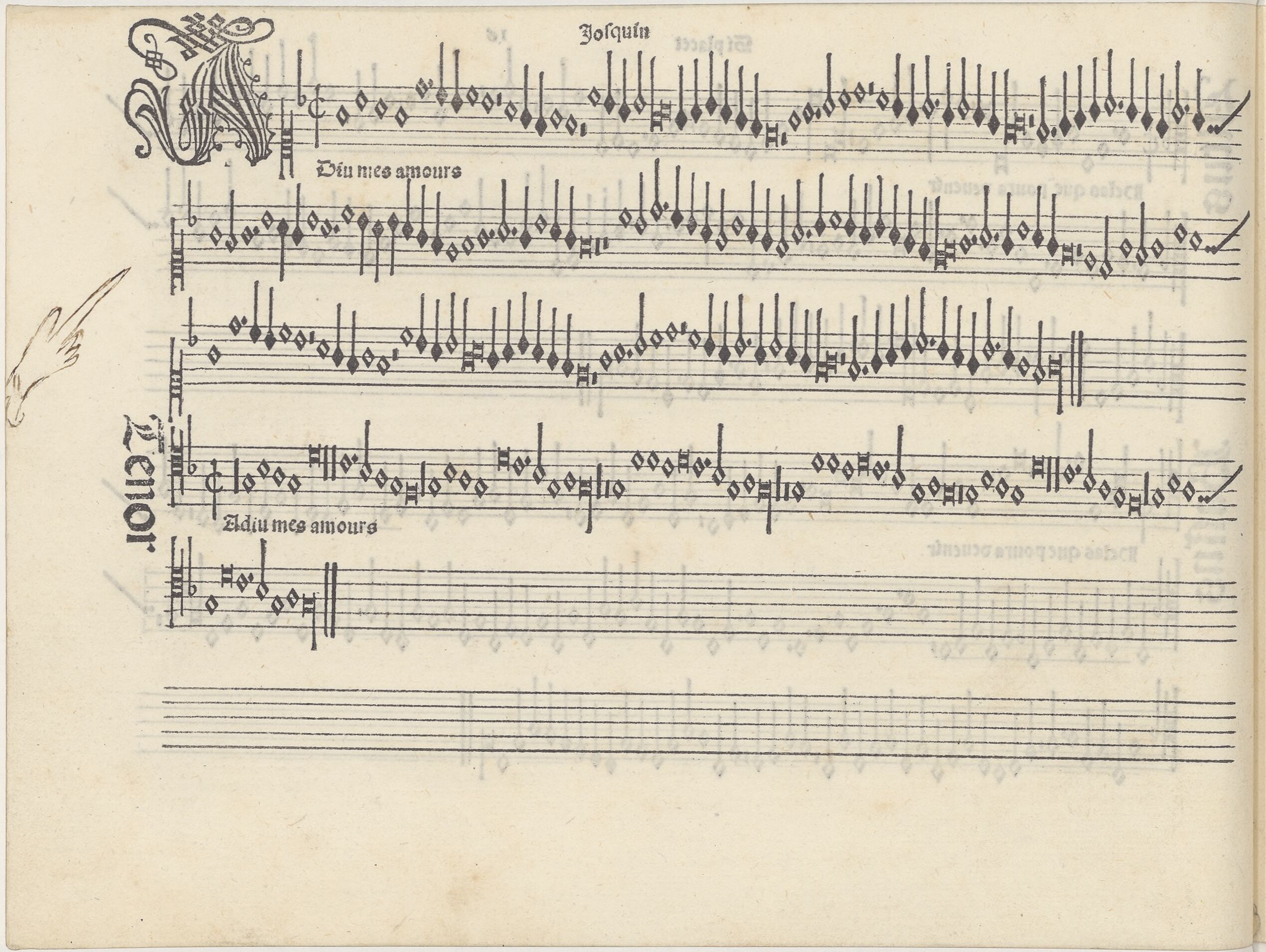
A page from the Odhecaton

=== Petrucci ===
The father of modern music printing was Ottaviano Petrucci, a printer and publisher who was able to secure a twenty-year monopoly on printed music in Venice during the 16th century. His first collection was entitled Harmonice Musices Odhecaton and contained 96 polyphonic compositions, mostly by Josquin des Prez and Heinrich Isaac. He flourished by focusing on Flemish works, rather than Italian, as they were very popular throughout Europe during the Renaissance. His printing shop used the triple-impression method, in which a sheet of paper was pressed three times. The first impression was the staff lines, the second the words, and the third the notes. This method produced very clean results, though it was time-consuming and expensive.

=== Rastell ===
Around 1520 in England, John Rastell developed a single-impression method for printing music. With his method, the staff lines, words and notes were all part of a single piece of type, making it much easier to produce. However, this method produced messier results, as the staff lines were often inexactly aligned and looked wavy on the page. The single-impression method eventually triumphed over Petrucci's and became the dominant mode of printing until copper-plate engraving took over in the 17th century. This method was adopted and used widely by a Frenchman, Pierre Attaingnant.

== Copyright ==
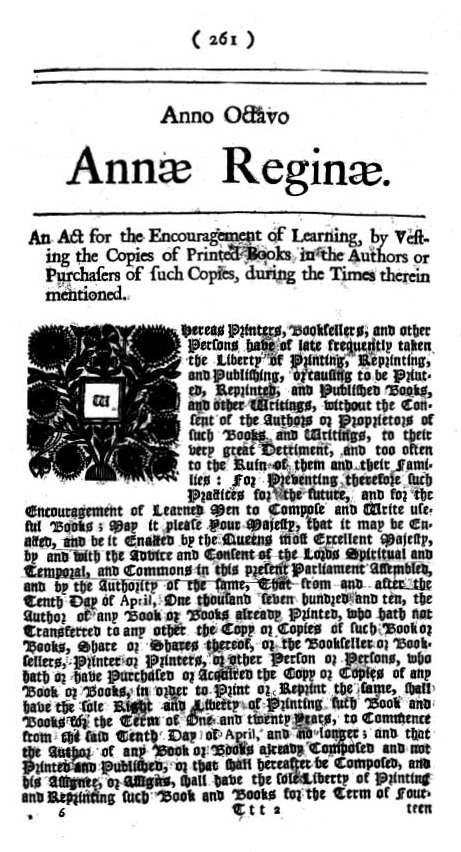
First page from the "Statute of Anne"

The concept of musical copyright had its beginnings in the reign of King Henry VIII of England who required copies of all printed matter to be sent to him and offered protection to printers in the form of licenses, primarily to produce a new source of revenue. In 1575 Elizabeth I granted Thomas Tallis and his pupil William Byrd a 21-year patent monopoly on the printing and publishing of polyphonic music. In 1618 German composer Heinrich Schütz submitted a petition to Johann Georg I to secure an electoral printing patent, for a period of ten years. Similar petitions were made in 1627 and 1636 (approval of the latter is preserved in documentation by Emperor Ferdinand III, 1637), and a request for renewal in 1642. The first modern copyright law was the Statute of Anne (1709), which protected all published works for a period of fourteen years, later extended to twenty-eight years. The earliest attempt at a printed musical copyright notice appears in the "Shir Hashirim" of Salomone Rossi (Venice, 1623) which includes a rabbinical curse on those infringing the text, written by Leon of Modena.

=== 1886 Berne Convention ===
The first international agreement involving copyright was the Berne Convention of 1886. The core principle of the convention is its provision that each of the contracting countries shall provide automatic protection for works in all other countries of the union and for unpublished works whose authors are citizens of or residents in those countries. Performance rights are included in these provisions. As of March 2012, 165 countries had become parties to the convention.

=== United States ===
The first U.S. federal copyright law gave protections to "maps, charts, and books." Contrary to some scholarly accounts, the 1790 Act's protection of "books" did encompass musical compositions. The first registration in the U.S. for a musical composition was made on January 6, 1794, by Raynor Taylor for the original song "The Kentucky Volunteer." However, musical compositions were not explicitly protected until the Copyright Act of 1831, and then protection remained limited to reproduction rights. The copyright term was twenty-eight years plus a fourteen-year renewal period.

== Performing rights ==
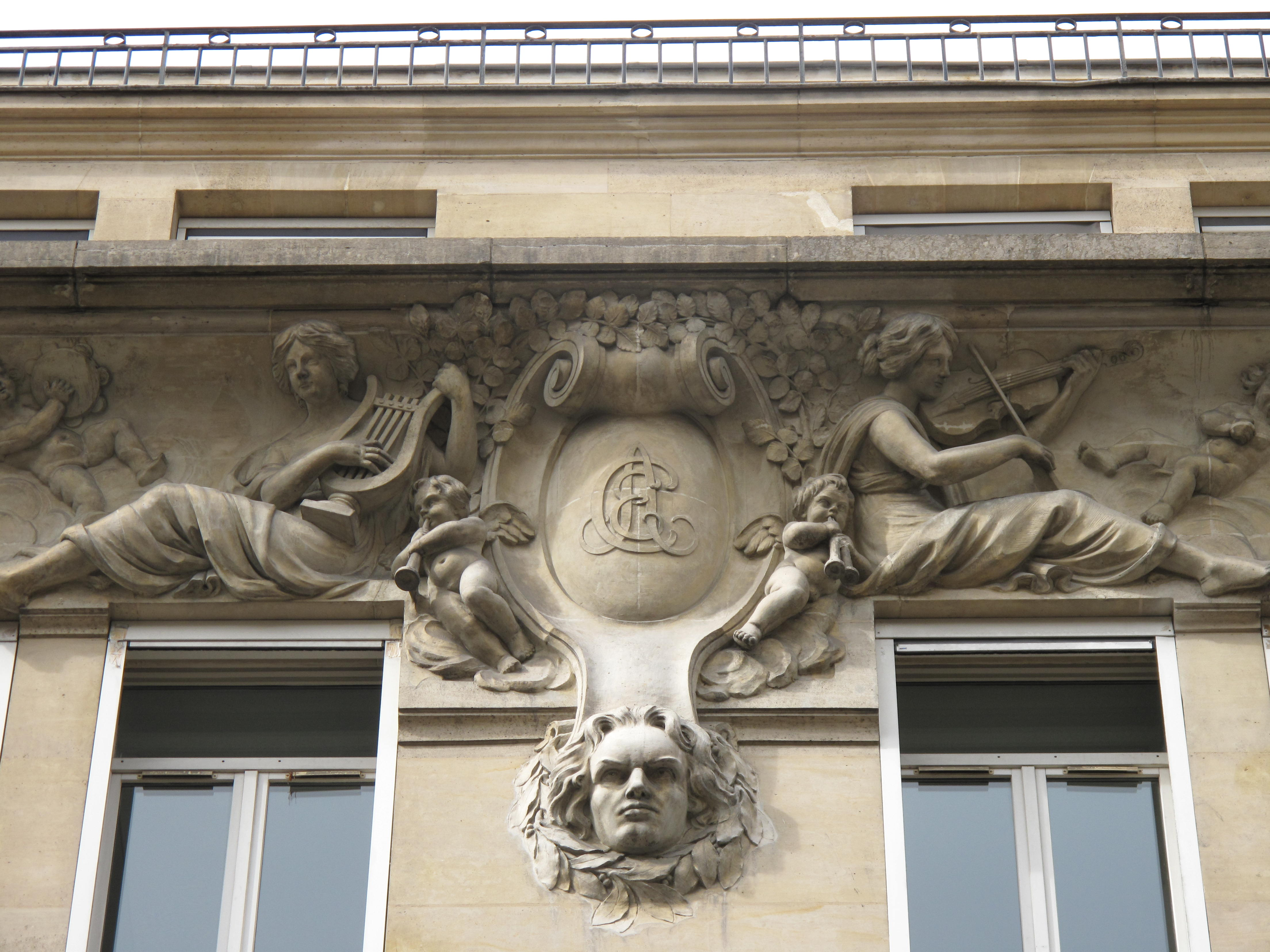
Façade of 10 Rue Chaptal, first home of SACEM

While England was a leader in the development of copyright, the French led the way in performing rights. In 1777, Pierre de Beaumarchais founded the "Bureau de Legislation Dramatique" which became the present Société des Auteurs et Compositeurs Dramatiques (SACD) in 1829. Many years later, in 1847, this inspired the composer and librettist Ernest Bourget to claim payment for each performance of his works at the Café des Ambassadeurs, a leading Café-concert venue of that time. A lawsuit won by Bourget and others in 1851 led to the formation of the Société des Auteurs, Compositeurs et Editeurs de Musique (SACEM) – the first performing rights society in the world.

Other countries followed suit: The Italian Società Italiana degli Autori ed Editori (SIAE) was founded in 1882 and the Spanish "Sociedad de Autores", predecessor of the current Sociedad General de Autores y Editores (SGAE), in 1899. The predecessor to the Gesellschaft für Musikalische Aufführungs und Mechanische Vervielfältigungsrechte (GEMA) was formed in Germany by composer Richard Strauss in 1903. It became GEMA in 1915 when it merged with another small society. So, by the end of the 19th century, the foundation had been laid for the modern music publishing industry.

== Early modern era: 18th century ==
=== German publishers ===
As England was a leader in developing copyright systems and France was ahead in developing performing rights, Germany was the pioneering country in modern music publishing. The first German music publishing enterprises date from the 18th century. Bernhard Christoph Breitkopf of Leipzig, a printer and general publisher, decided to specialize in music printing as of 1754. He became successful by developing improvements in the setting of music type. Gottfried Christoph Härtel joined the firm in 1795, which soon became the partnership of Breitkopf & Härtel. They were the original publishers for a who's-who of great German composers, including Beethoven, Haydn, Mozart, Schubert, Schumann and Wagner.

Schott Music of Mainz was founded in 1770 by Bernhard Schott and still exists today. They specialized in French and Italian operas and, more recently, have published works by Hindemith, Stravinsky, Orff, Schoenberg and Henze. N. Simrock of Bonn, and later Berlin, was established in 1790 by Nikolaus Simrock. Their original publications included works by Beethoven, Haydn, Meyerbeer, Weber, Mendelssohn, Schumann and Brahms.

=== United States ===
In 1764, Josiah Flagg compiled the first collection of popular and religious music, printed on paper made in the colonies. The post-revolutionary period was notable for the arrival of the first professional music publishers from Europe in the 1770s. They opened shops in Philadelphia, New York, Boston and Baltimore, bringing with them European technology. Benjamin Carr and James Hewitt were two important early American music publishers. The first song published under US copyright was The Kentucky Volunteer, by Carr's own house.

In the first quarter of the 19th century alone, 10,000 pieces of popular music were printed by U.S. publishers. The industry, however, did nothing to promote music or develop writers. Songs became popular by word-of-mouth. Most minstrel troupes and professional singers wrote their own music or had songs written to order. Stephen Foster was the first composer who tried to make a living as an independent professional songwriter but, in the 1850s, copyright protection was so lax and royalties so small (or non-existent) that he found himself living in poverty. This changed only gradually as young men involved in other business enterprises began to perceive the possibilities for enrichment in song publishing.

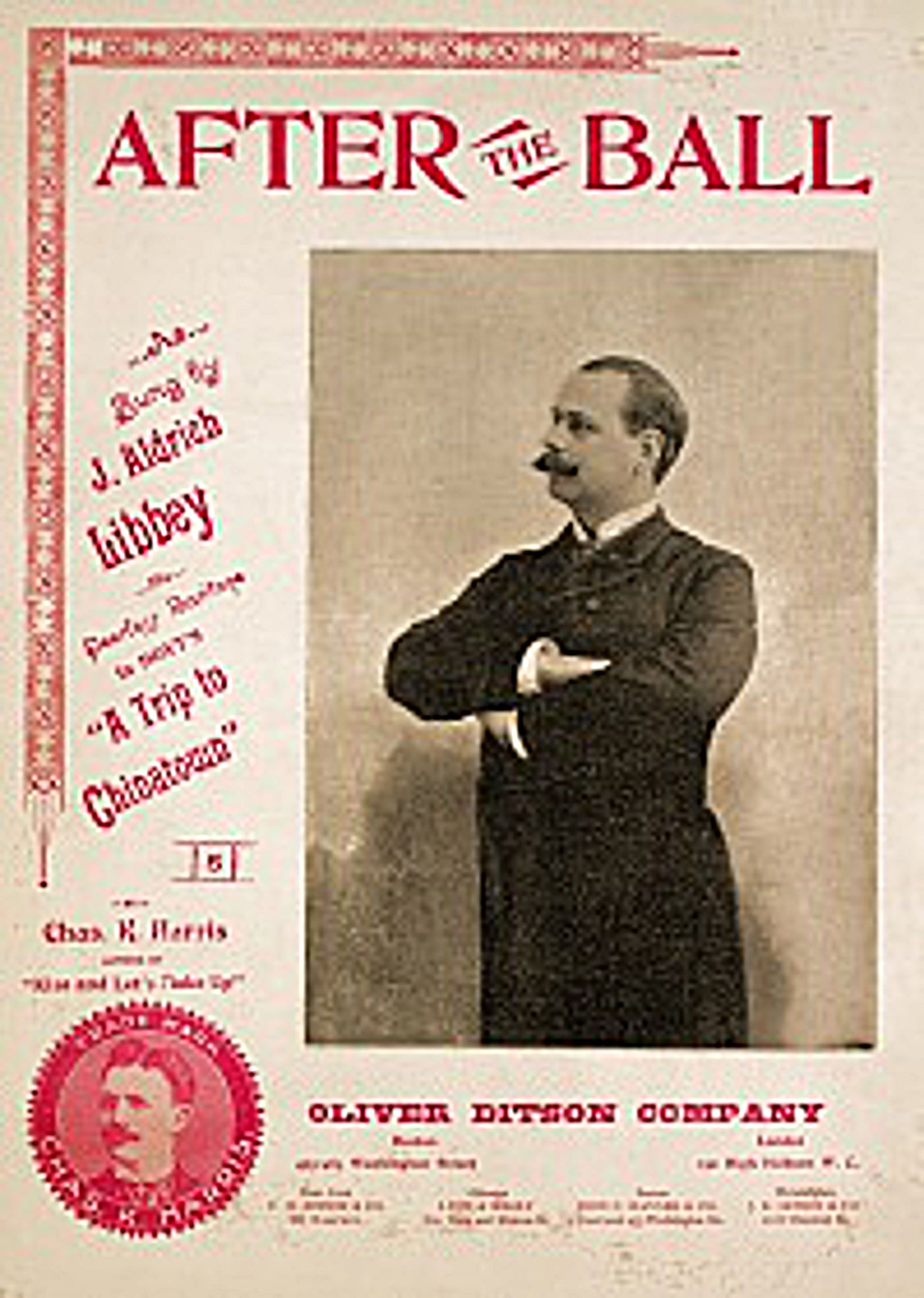
Sheet music for "After the Ball"

Prior to the 1880s, popular music publishing was a secondary function of music stores or "serious" (Classical) music publishers. After 1880, publishers in New York developed a promotional technique called plugging. By 1900, most music publishers had clustered their businesses along 28th St. (between 6th Ave. and Broadway) in order to be closer to New York's thriving entertainment center. This area came to be known as Tin Pan Alley. The first decade of the 20th century saw the production of more popular music than had ever been written up to that time: about 25,000 songs annually. In 1893, sheet music for the song "After the Ball" sold one million copies and, over the next ten years, went on to sell a total of ten million.

Despite the enactment of new U.S. copyright legislation, including the 1891 Chace Act, which allowed for the international protection of copyrights, the provisions of the 1909 Copyright Act were generally ignored. To correct this situation, operetta composer Victor Herbert established the American Society of Composers, Authors and Publishers (ASCAP), in 1914. It quickly attracted prominent composers such as Irving Berlin and John Philip Sousa, and was able to ensure that everyone was properly paid and credited for their work.

== Licensing ==
There are many aspects to music publishing. Chief among them is the licensing of music for use in advertising, television, films and other purposes. Music publishing started out by just being the publishing of the actual sheet music, and not even the score. Song sheets were made which just had the lyrics of a popular song. In the 19th century, sheet music for songs began including a simple piano accompaniment and notation for the song's melody. In the 2010s, music publishing is the exploitation of compositions (songs, instrumental pieces, and other music) for various performance uses, including newer uses such as licensing for video games, for use by recording artists looking for their next hit single and for use in a range of licensing purposes.

=== Licenses ===
Within music publishing there are many different types of licenses. For instance:

- Blanket license
- Mechanical license
- Performing Rights License (PRO)
- Synchronization License or Sync Rights

A blanket license is an annual fee paid to one of the key performing rights organizations (PRO) (SESAC, ASCAP, or BMI). The blanket license paid to the PRO covers every work that is in the PRO's catalog. Blanket licenses are mostly used by television networks and radio stations so that they have the right to play any song or piece from one catalog instead of paying license fees for each song individually.

A mechanical license is issued when a recording artist wishes to sell their recording of a written composition. It serves as a notice to the composition owners that sales are forthcoming and that royalties dictated by a statutory rate will be owed and paid to them.

A Performing Rights License (PRO) is the license that gives the licensee the right to publicly perform the song/work.

Lastly, a sync license grants the right to use the composition in the synchronization of a recording over a moving picture in a film, advertisement, television show or any other audiovisual work. For the same synchronization use, one must also obtain a master use license, which grants rights to use the sound recording, which is a separately owned asset from the composition.

A music publisher negotiates the uses and fees for the songwriters and composers on their roster. In the 2010s, publishing companies are a main source of revenue besides live touring, because sync licensing has persisted as a substantial income source while the music industry underwent changes that saw their previously dominant income source, record sales, steadily decline.

== Technologies ==
=== Sound recording ===
The invention and development of sound recording resulted in a redefinition of the concept of publishing, much the same as online music stores in the 2000s would later revolutionize how recordings are purchased. Initially, popular music was slow to take advantage of the new technology. In 1910, when sales of the new disc format exceeded those of the old cylinder, more than 75% of the records sold were classical music. One factor in this may have been the expense, which would have concentrated sales among the more upscale purchasers. Until 1925, sheet music sales continued to surpass discs and were the primary source of revenue for publishers and composers. At that point, sheet music sales began to decline while records were still providing inadequate income to compensate. This led to short lived but serious economic problems for some publishers.

=== Film music ===
Samuel Fox (1884–1971) who founded the Sam Fox Publishing Company in 1906, was the first to publish original film scores. In 1927, after the release of The Jazz Singer (the first talkie), the need for music led movie studios to buy music publishing companies, gaining both catalogues of music and experienced composers at the same time. For example, in 1929, Warner Brothers paid 10 million dollars for Harms, Witmark and Remick; MGM bought Leo Feist Inc. and some smaller companies; Paramount started its own publishing division, Famous Music.

== See also ==
- Copyright – Legal concept regulating rights of a creative work
- List of best-selling sheet music
- List of women music publishers before 1900
- Music engraving – Process of drawing music notation at high quality for reproduction
- Music publisher – Publisher specializing in the distribution of music
- Record label – Brand associated with music and music videos
- Sheet music – Full musical score showing each part on a separate line or staff
- Universal Circulating Music Library – Music publishers' lending library
