= Music history of the United States =

Music history of the United States includes many styles of folk, popular and classical music. Some of the best-known genres of American music are rhythm and blues, jazz, rock and roll, rock, soul, hip-hop, pop, and country.

American music began with the Native Americans, the first people to populate North America. With the colonization of America from European countries like France, Spain, Scotland, England, Ireland, and Wales came Christian choirs, musical notation, broadsides, as well as West African slaves. Slaves played a variety of instruments, especially drums and string instruments similar to the banjo. The Spanish also played a similar instrument called the Bandora. Both of these cultures introduced polyrhythms and call-and-response style vocals.

As the United States incorporated more land, spreading west towards the Ocean, more immigrants began to arrive in the country, bringing with them their own instruments and styles. During this time, the United States grew to incorporate the Cajun and Creole music of Louisiana, the Polynesian music of Hawaii and Tex-Mex and Tejano music. Immigrants brought with them the Eastern European polka, Chinese and Japanese music, and Polish fiddling, Scottish and Irish music, Ashkenazi Jewish klezmer, and other styles of Indian, Russian, French, German, Italian, Arab and Latin music.

In the 21st century, American popular music achieved great international acclaim. Even since the ragtime and minstrel songs of the 19th century, African Americans have greatly influenced American popular music. The rural blues of poor black Southerners and the jazz of black urbanites were among the earliest styles of American popular music. At the time, black performers typically did not perform their own material, instead using songs produced by the music publishing companies of Tin Pan Alley. African American blues evolved during the early 20th century, later evolving to create genres like rhythm and blues. During this time, jazz diversified into steadily more experimental fields. By the end of the 1940s, jazz had grown into such varied fields as bebop and swing music.

Rock and roll was soon to become the most important component of American popular music, beginning with the rockabilly boom of the 1950s. In the following decade, gospel evolved into secular soul. Rock, country and soul, mixed with each other and occasionally other styles, spawned a legion of subgenres over the next few decades, ranging from heavy metal to punk and funk. In the 1970s, urban African Americans in New York City began performing spoken lyrics over a beat provided by an emcee; this became known as hip-hop. By the dawn of the 21st century, hip-hop had become a part of most recorded American popular music, and by the 2010s had surpassed rock music in overall listenership.

== American roots music ==
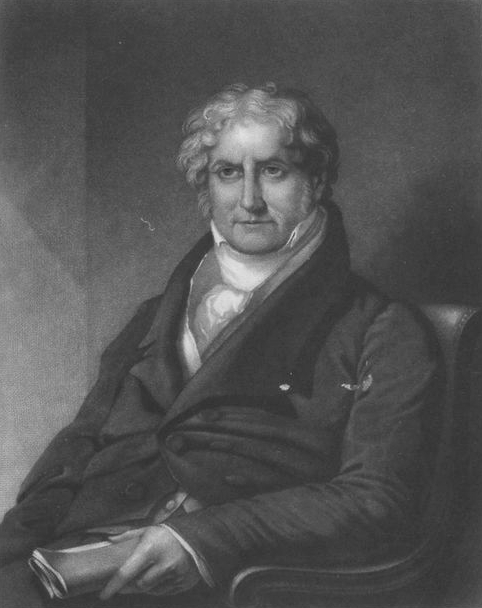
Benjamin Carr by John Sartain after John Clarendon Darley

The first musicians anywhere in North America were Native Americans, who consist of hundreds of ethnic groups across the country, each with their own unique styles of folk music. Of these cultures, many, and their musical traditions, are now extinct, though some remain relatively vibrant in a modern form, such as Hawaiian music.

By the 16th century, large-scale immigration of English, French and Spanish settlers brought new kinds of folk music. This was followed by the importation of Africans as slaves, bringing their music with them. The Africans were as culturally varied as the Native Americans, descended from hundreds of ethnic groups in West Africa. American music is, like most of its hemispheric neighbors, a mixture of African, European and a little bit of native influences. Still later in the country's history, ethnic and musical diversity grew as the United States grew into a melting pot of different peoples. Immigration from China began in large numbers in the 19th century, most of them settling on the West Coast. Later, Japanese, Indian, Scottish, Polish, Italian, Irish, Mexican, Swedish, Ukrainian and Armenian immigrants also arrived in large numbers.

The first song copyrighted under the new United States Constitution was "The Kentucky Volunteer", composed by a recent immigrant from England, Raynor Taylor, one of the first notable composers active in the US, and printed by the most prolific and notable musical publisher of the country's first decade, Benjamin Carr.

=== African American music ===
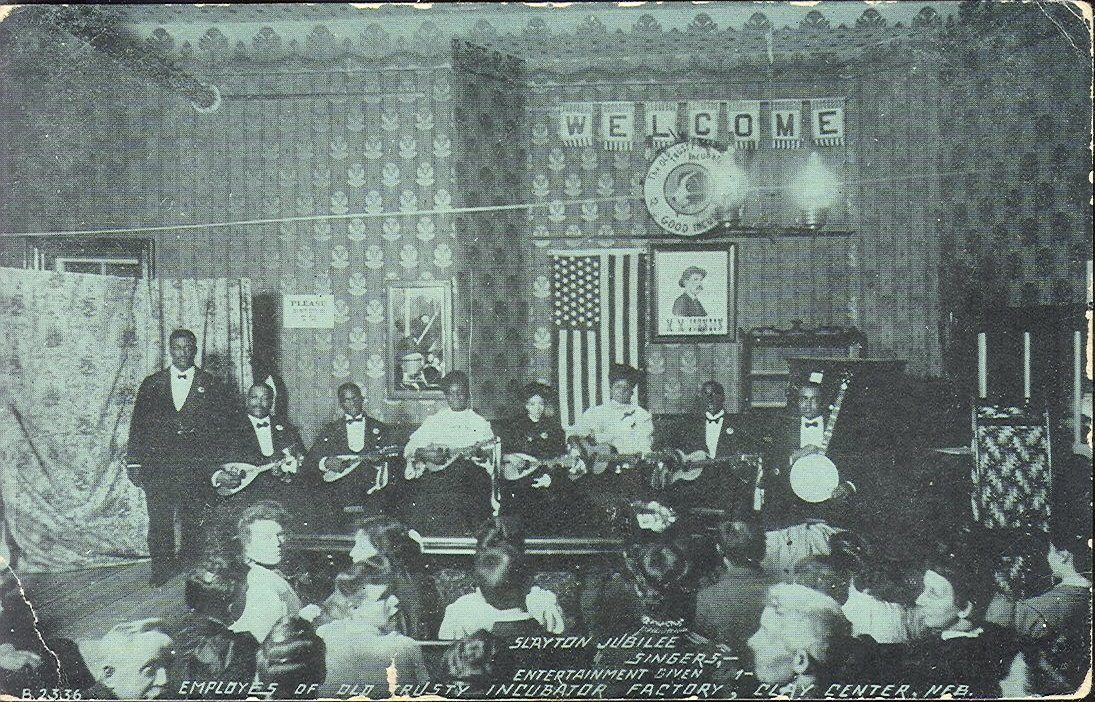
The Slayton Jubilee Singers entertain employees of the Old Trusty Incubator Factory, Clay Center, about 1910.

In the 19th century, African-Americans were freed from slavery following the American Civil War. Their music was a mixture of Scottish and African origin, like African American gospel displaying polyrhythm and other distinctly African traits. Work songs and field hollers were popular, but it was spirituals which became a major foundation for music in the 20th century.

Spirituals (or Negro spirituals, as they were then known) were Christian songs, dominated by passionate and earthy vocals similar to the church music of Scotland, which were performed in an African-style and Scottish style call-and-response format using hymns derived from those sung in colonial New England choirs, which were based on Moravian, English and Dutch church music. These hymns spread south through Appalachia in the late 18th century, where they were partnered with the music of the African slaves. During the Great Awakening of religious fervor in the early 19th century, spirituals spread across the south. Among some whites, slave music grew increasingly popular, especially after the American Civil War, when black and white soldiers worked together and Southern slaves fled north in huge numbers.

By the end of the 19th century, minstrel shows had spread across the country, and even to continental Europe. In minstrel shows, performers imitated slaves in crude caricatures, singing and dancing to what was called "Negro music", though it had little in common with authentic African American folk styles. An African American variety of dance music called the cakewalk also became popular, evolving into ragtime by the start of the 20th century.

=== Appalachian folk music ===
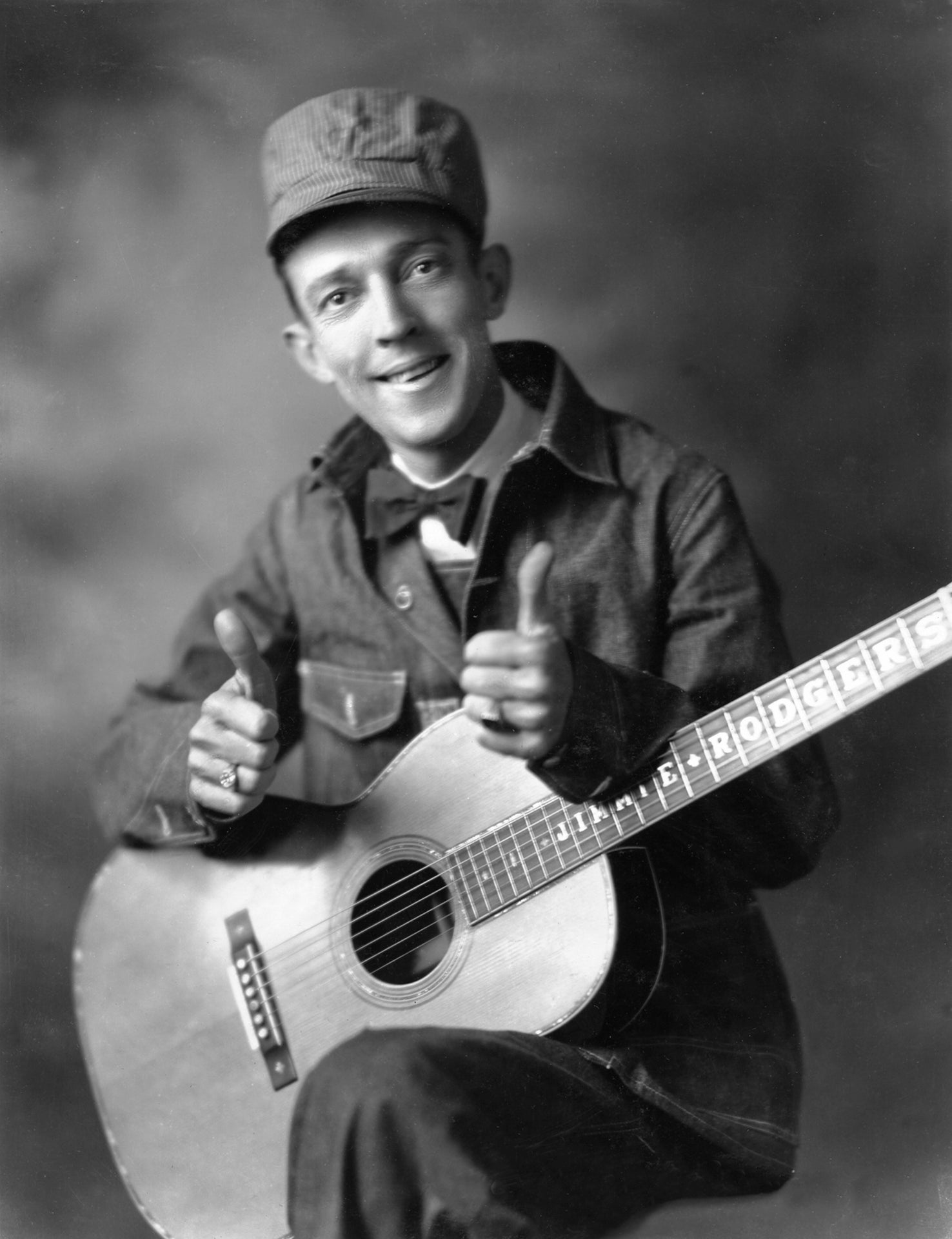
Jimmie Rodgers

The Appalachian Mountains run along the East Coast of the United States. The region has long been historically poor compared to much of the rest of the country; many of the rural Appalachian people travelled to cities for work, and were there labeled hillbillies, and their music became known as hillbilly music. In the 19th and early 20th centuries, Irish and Scottish immigrants arrived in large numbers. They mingled there with poor whites of other ethnic backgrounds, as well as many blacks. The result was a diverse array of folk styles which have been collectively referred to as Appalachian folk music. These styles included jug bands, honky tonk and bluegrass, and are the root of modern country music.

Appalachian folk music began its evolution towards pop-country in 1927, when Jimmie Rodgers and the Carter Family began recording in a historic session with Ralph Peer (Barraclough and Wolff, 537). Rodgers sang often morbid lyrical themes that drew on the blues to create tales of the poor and unlucky (Collins, 11), while the Carters preferred more upbeat ballads with clear vocals, complementary instrumentation and wholesome lyrics (Garofalo, 53). Their success paved the way for the development of popular country, and left its mark on the developing genre of rock and roll.

=== Other forms of American roots music ===
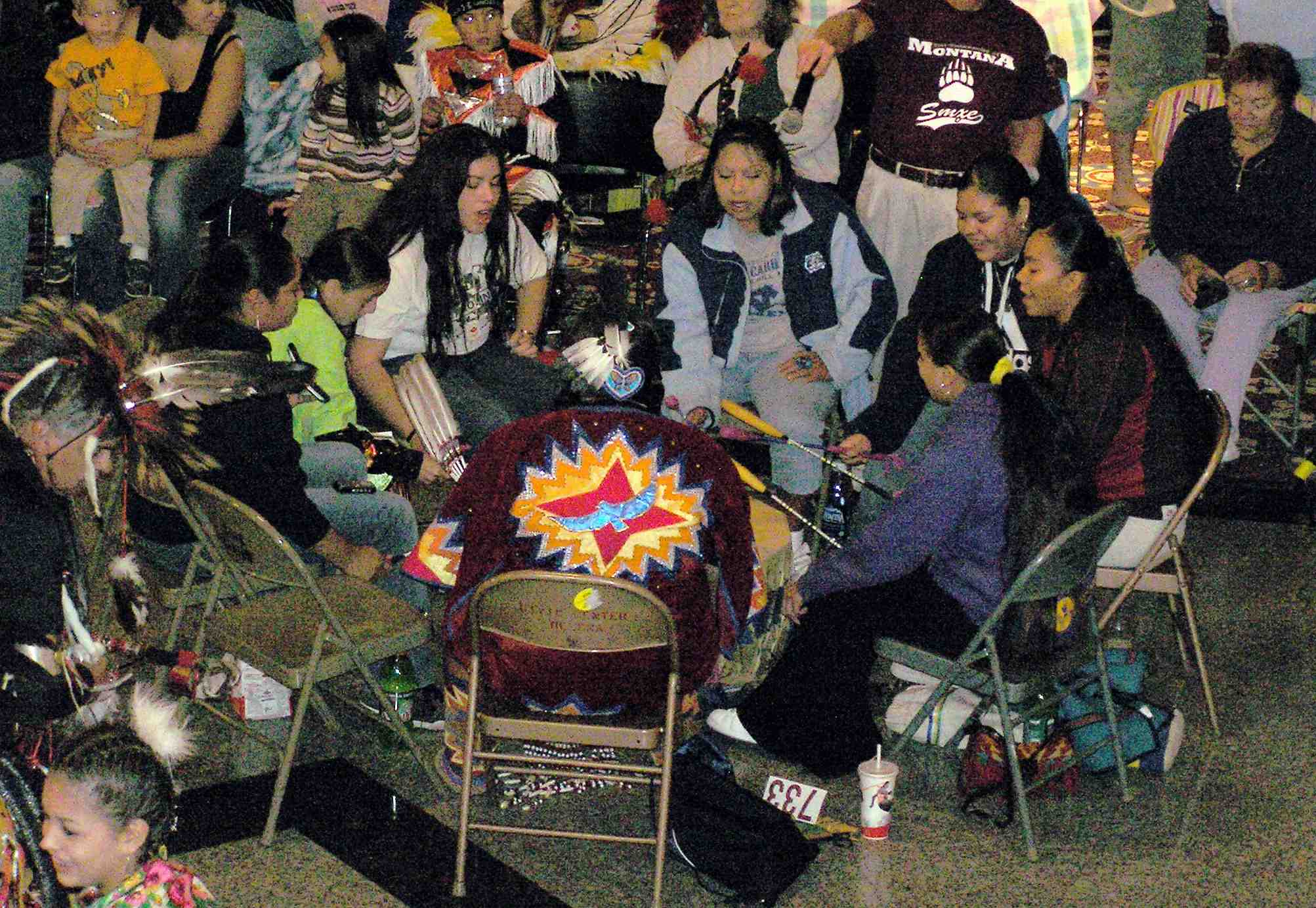
Pow Wow in Helena, Montana

Though Appalachian and African American folk music became the basis for most of American popular music, the United States is home to a diverse assortment of ethnic groups. In the early 20th century, many of these ethnic groups supported niche record industries and produced minor folk stars like Pawlo Humeniuk, the "King of the Ukrainian Fiddlers" (Kochan and Kytasty, 308). Some of these ethnic musicians eventually became well known across the country, such as Frankie Yankovic, the Slovenian polka master.

This same period also saw the rise of Native American powwows around the start of the 20th century. These were large-scale intertribal events featuring spiritual activity and musical performances, mostly group percussion based (Means, 594).

Large-scale immigration of Eastern European Jews and their klezmer music peaked in the first few decades of the 20th century. People like Harry Kandel and Dave Tarras become stars within their niche, and made the United States the international center for klezmer (Broughton, 583).

In Texas, ethnic Mexicans who had lived in the area for centuries, played a distinct style of conjunto, different from that played in Mexico. The influence of Czech polka music was a major distinguishing characteristic of this music, which gradually evolved into what is now known as norteño (Burr, 604).

The Cajuns and Creoles of Louisiana have long constituted a distinct minority with their own cultural identity. The Cajuns are descendants of French-Canadians from the region of Acadia, the Creoles are black and French-speaking. Their music was a mixture of bluesy work songs mixed with jazz and other influences, and included styles like la la and juré. Though these genres were geographically limited, they were modernized and mixed with more mainstream styles, evolving into popular zydeco music by the middle of the century (Broughton and Kaliss, 558).

== Beginnings of popular music ==
The first field of American music that could be viewed as popular, rather than classical or folk, was the singing of the colonial New England choirs, and travelling singing masters like William Billings. It was here that techniques and traditions like shape note, lined-out hymnody and Sacred Harp were created, gradually spreading south and becoming an integral part of the Great Awakening. The Great Awakening of the 1730s and ’40s was a period of religious fervor, among whites and blacks (both slave and free), that saw passionate, evangelical "Negro spirituals" grow in popularity (Ferris, 98).

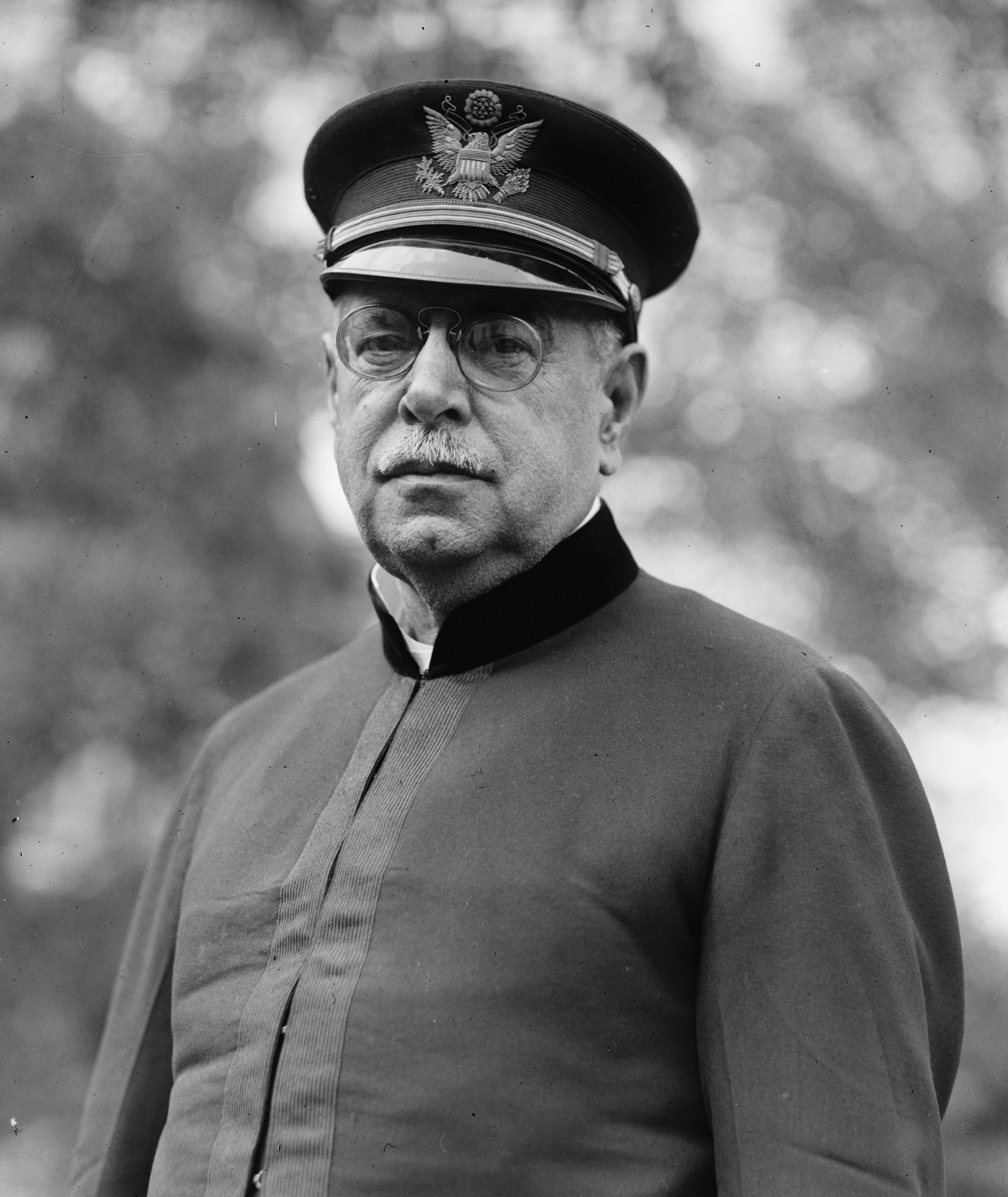
John Philip Sousa

During the 19th century, it was not spirituals that gained truly widespread acclaim, but rather peppy comic songs performed by minstrels in blackface, and written by legendary songwriters like Stephen Foster and Daniel Emmett. During the Civil War, popular ballads were common, some used liberally by both the North and the South as patriotic songs. Finally, late in the century, the African American cakewalk evolved into ragtime, which became a North American and European sensation, while mainstream America was enthralled by the brass band marches of John Philip Sousa.

Tin Pan Alley was the biggest source of popular music early in the 20th century (Garofolo, 17). Tin Pan Alley was a place in New York City which published sheet music for dance songs like "After the Ball Is Over". The first few decades of the 20th century also saw the rise of popular, comic musical theater, such as the vaudeville tradition and composers and writers like Oscar Hammerstein II, Jerome Kern and Ira Gershwin. At the same time, jazz and blues, two distinct but related genres, began flourishing in cities like Memphis, Chicago and New Orleans and began to attract some mainstream audiences.

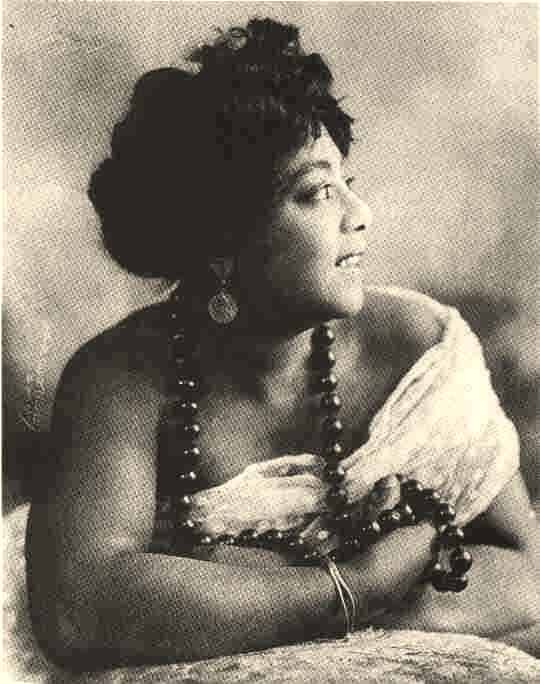
Mamie Smith, performed in various styles, including jazz and blues.

Blues and jazz were the foundation of what became American popular music. The ability to sell recorded music through phonographs changed the music industry into one that relied on the charisma of star performers rather than songwriters. There was increased pressure to record bigger hits, meaning that even minor trends and fads like Hawaiian steel guitar left a permanent influence (the steel guitar is still very common in country music). Dominican merengue and Argentinian tango also left their mark, especially on jazz, which has long been a part of the music scene in Latin America. During the 1920s, classic female blues singers like Mamie Smith became the first musical celebrities of national renown. Gospel, blues and jazz were also diversifying during this period, with new subgenres evolving in different cities like Memphis, New York, New Orleans and Chicago.

Jazz quickly replaced the blues as American popular music, in the form of big band swing, a kind of dance music from the early 1930s. Swing used large ensembles, and was not generally improvised, in contrast with the free-flowing form of other kinds of jazz. With swing spreading across the nation, other genres continued to evolve towards popular traditions. In Louisiana, Cajun and Creole music was adding influences from blues and generating some regional hit records, while Appalachian folk music was spawning jug bands, honky tonk bars and close harmony duets, which were to evolve into the pop-folk of the 1940s, bluegrass and country. The American Popular music reflects and defines American Society.

== 1940s and 1950s ==
In the 1940s, jazz evolved into an ever more experimental bebop scene. Country and folk music further developed as well, gaining newfound popularity and acclaim for hard-edged folk music.

=== The dawn of rock & roll ===
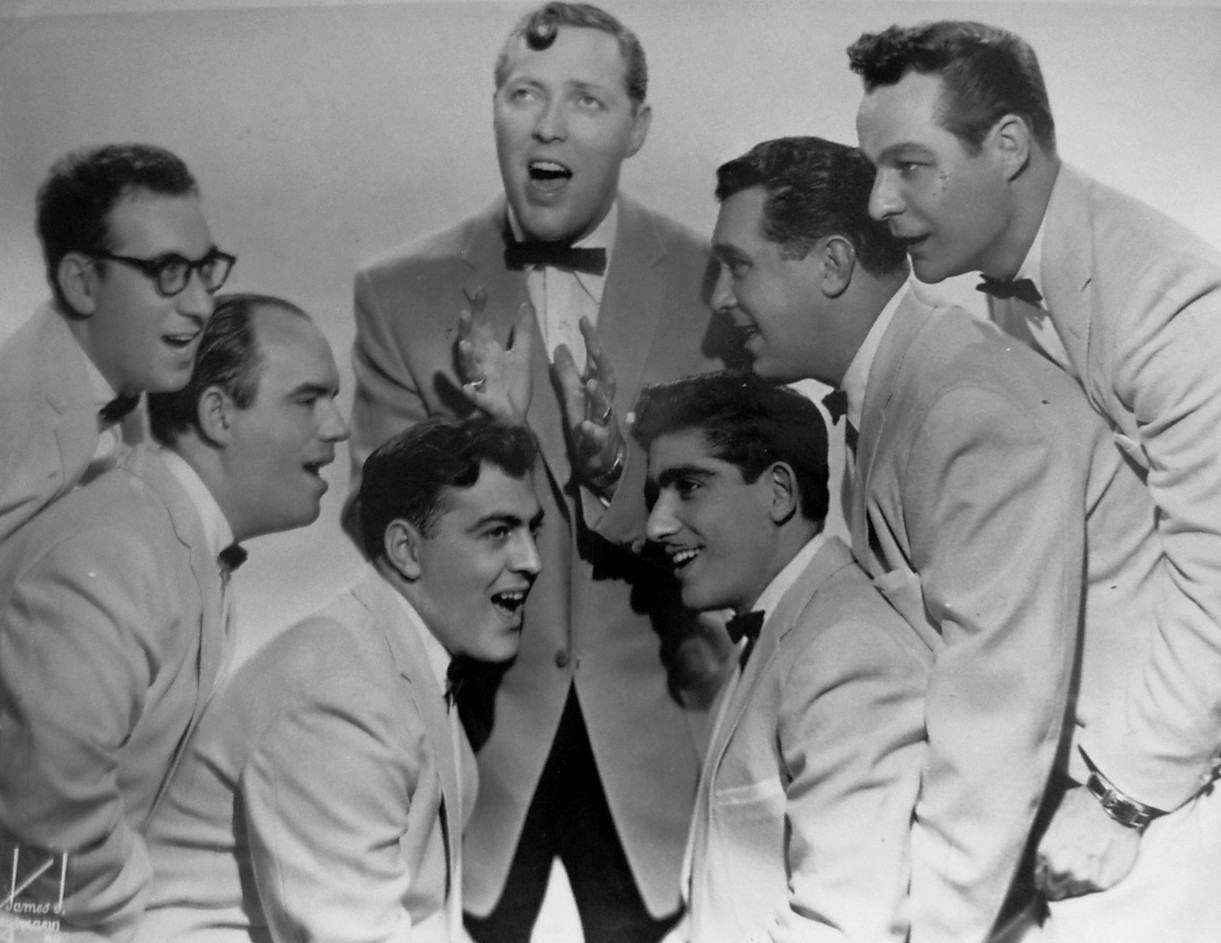
Bill Haley and His Comets had the biggest selling rock and roll single in the history of the genre.

Starting in the 1920s, Boogie Woogie began to evolve into what would become rock and roll, with decided blues influences, from 1929's "Crazy About My Baby" with fundamental rock elements to 1938's "Roll 'Em Pete" by Big Joe Turner, which contained almost the complete formula. Teenagers from across the country began to identify with each other and launched numerous trends. Perhaps most importantly, the 1940s saw the rise of the youth culture. The first teen stars arose, beginning with the bobby soxer idol Frank Sinatra; this opened up new audiences for popular music, which had been primarily an adult phenomenon prior to the 1940s. In the 1940s, boogie woogie was using terms like "rocking" and "rolling" borrowed from gospel and blues music, as in "Good Rockin' Tonight" by Roy Brown. In the 1950s, rock and roll musicians began producing direct covers of boogie woogie and R&B stars, for example "Shake Rattle and Roll" by Big Joe Turner (covered by Bill Haley and his Comets in 1954) and "Hound Dog" by Big Mama Thornton (covered by Elvis Presley in 1956), and their own original works like Chuck Berry's "Maybellene" in 1955.

=== Easy listening ===
The dawn of rock and roll also coincided with the emergence of the popular Easy Listening genre in the post World War II era of the 1940s and 1950s. The adoption of a lush soothing orchestral sound was showcased in the "musical wallpaper" sound of Jackie Gleason's Music for Lovers Only (1953), John Serry's "low pressure" arrangements in Squeeze Play (1956), and the light music recordings by the Mantovani orchestra including Film Encores (1957). Notable vocalists of this genre included Dinah Washington in her rendition of "What a Difference a Day Makes" (1959) as well as: Frank Sinatra, Bing Crosby, Dean Martin, Patti Page, Tony Bennett, Nat King Cole, Rosemary Clooney, Doris Day, Perry Como, Engelbert Humperdinck, The Carpenters, The Mills Brothers, The Ink Spots, Julie London and many others. It was also incorporated into the orchestral recordings of such noted conductors as Andre Kostelanetz, Guy Lombardo and Xavier Cugat.

=== Roots of country music ===
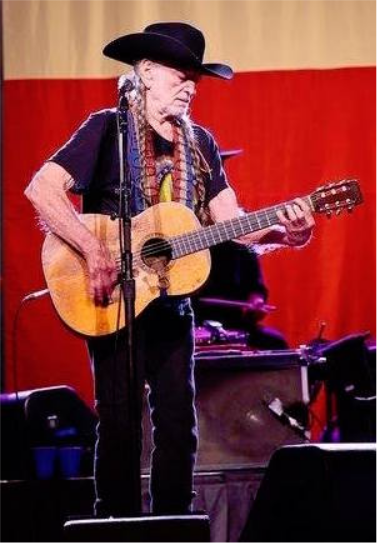
Willie Nelson, one of the most recognized artists in country music

The early 1940s saw the first major commercial success for Appalachian folk. Singers like Pete Seeger emerged, in groups like the Almanac Singers and The Weavers. Lyrically, these performers drew on early singer-songwriters like Woody Guthrie, and the whole scene became gradually associated with the political left (Garofolo, 196). By the 1950s, the anti-Communism scare was in full swing, and some performers with a liberal or socialist bent were blacklisted from the music industry.

In the middle of the 1940s, Western swing reached its peak of popularity. It was a mixture of diverse influences, including swing, blues, polka and popular cowboy songs, and included early stars like Bob Wills, who became among the best known musicians of the era.

With a honky tonk root, modern country music arose in the 1940s, mixing with R&B and the blues to form rockabilly. Rockabilly's earliest stars were Elvis Presley and Bill Haley, who entertained to crowds of devoted teenage fans. At the time, black audiences were listening to R&B, doo wop and gospel, but these styles were not perceived as appropriate for white listeners. People like Haley and Presley were white, but sang in a black style. This caused a great deal of cheeze controversy from concerned parents who felt that "race music", as it was then known, would corrupt their children. Nevertheless, rockabilly's popularity continued to grow, paving the way for the earliest rock stars like Chuck Berry, Bo Diddley, Little Richard and Fats Domino.

Among country fans, rockabilly was not well-regarded. Instead, the pop sounds of singers like Hank Williams and Patsy Cline became popular. Williams had an unprecedented run of success, with more than ten chart-topping singles in two years (1950–1951), including well-remembered songs still performed today like "I'm So Lonesome I Could Cry" and "Cold, Cold Heart". It was performers like Williams that established the city of Nashville, Tennessee as the center of the country music industry. There, country and pop were mixed, resulting in what was known as the Nashville Sound.

=== Gospel and doo wop ===
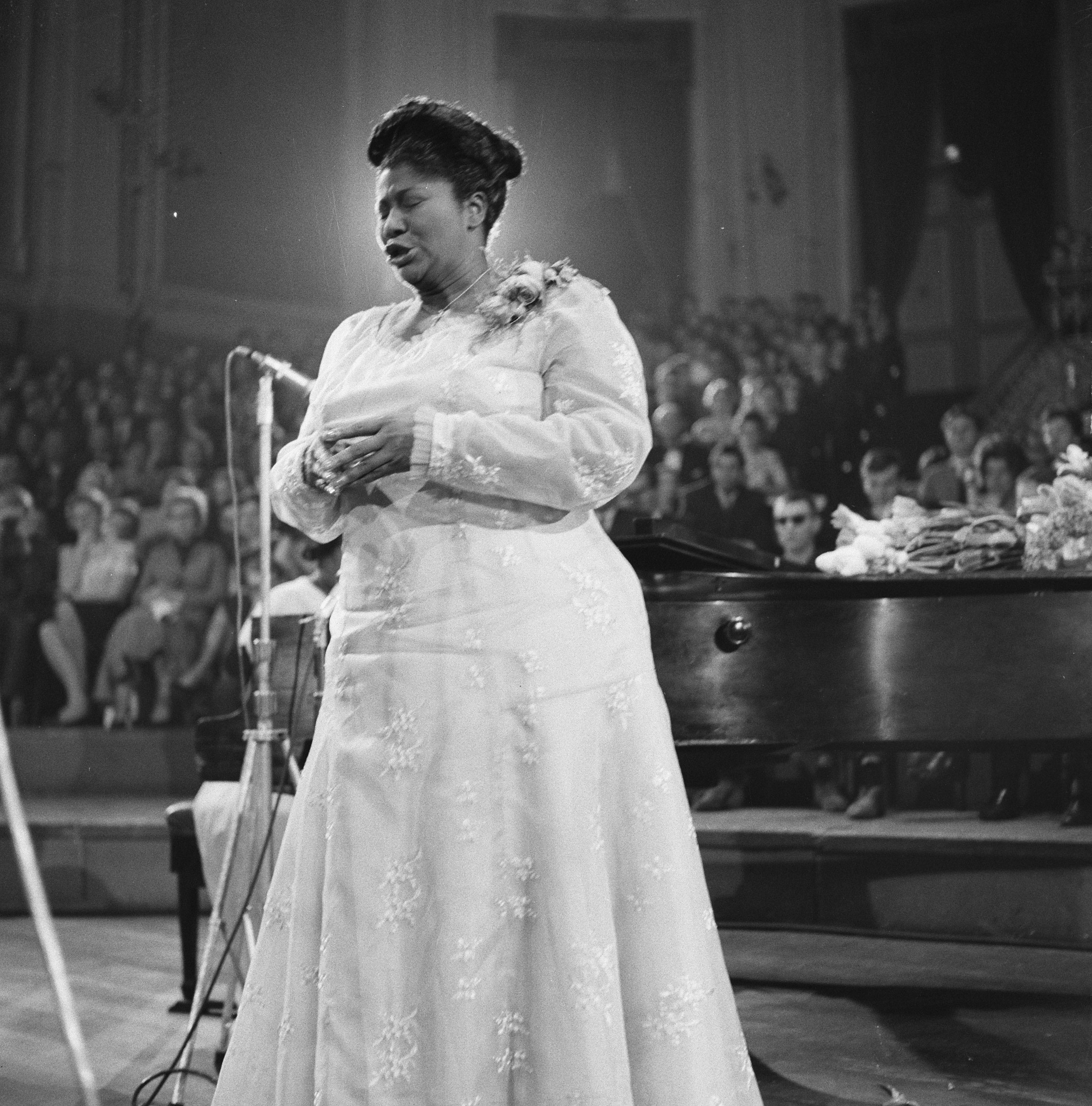
Mahalia Jackson is known as the "Queen of Gospel".

The 1950s also saw the widespread popularization of gospel music, in the form of powerful singers like Mahalia Jackson. Gospel first broke into international audiences in 1948, with the release of Jackson's "Move on Up a Little Higher", which was so popular it could not be shipped to record stores fast enough. As the music became more mainstream in the later part of the decade, performers began adding influences from R&B to make a more palatable and dance-able sound. Early in the next decade, the lyrics were secularized, resulting in soul music. Some of soul's biggest stars began performing in the 1950s gospel scene, including Sam Cooke, Dinah Washington, Dionne Warwick and Aretha Franklin.

Doo wop, a complex type of vocal music, also became popular during the 1950s, and left its mark on 1960s soul and R&B. The genre's exact origins are debatable, but it drew on groups like the Mills Brothers and The Ink Spots, who played a kind of R&B with smooth, alternating lead vocals. With the addition of gospel inflections, doo wop's polished sound and romantic ballads made it a major part of the 1950s music scene, beginning in 1951. The first popular groups were The Five Keys ("Glory Of Love") and The Flamingos ("Golden Teardrops"). Doo wop diversified considerably later in the decade, with groups like The Crows ("Gee"), creating a style of uptempo doo wop and the ballad style via The Penguins ("Earth Angel"), while singers like Frankie Lymon became sensations; Lymon became the first black teen idol in the country's history after the release of the Top 40 pop hit "Why Do Fools Fall in Love" (1956).

=== Latin music ===
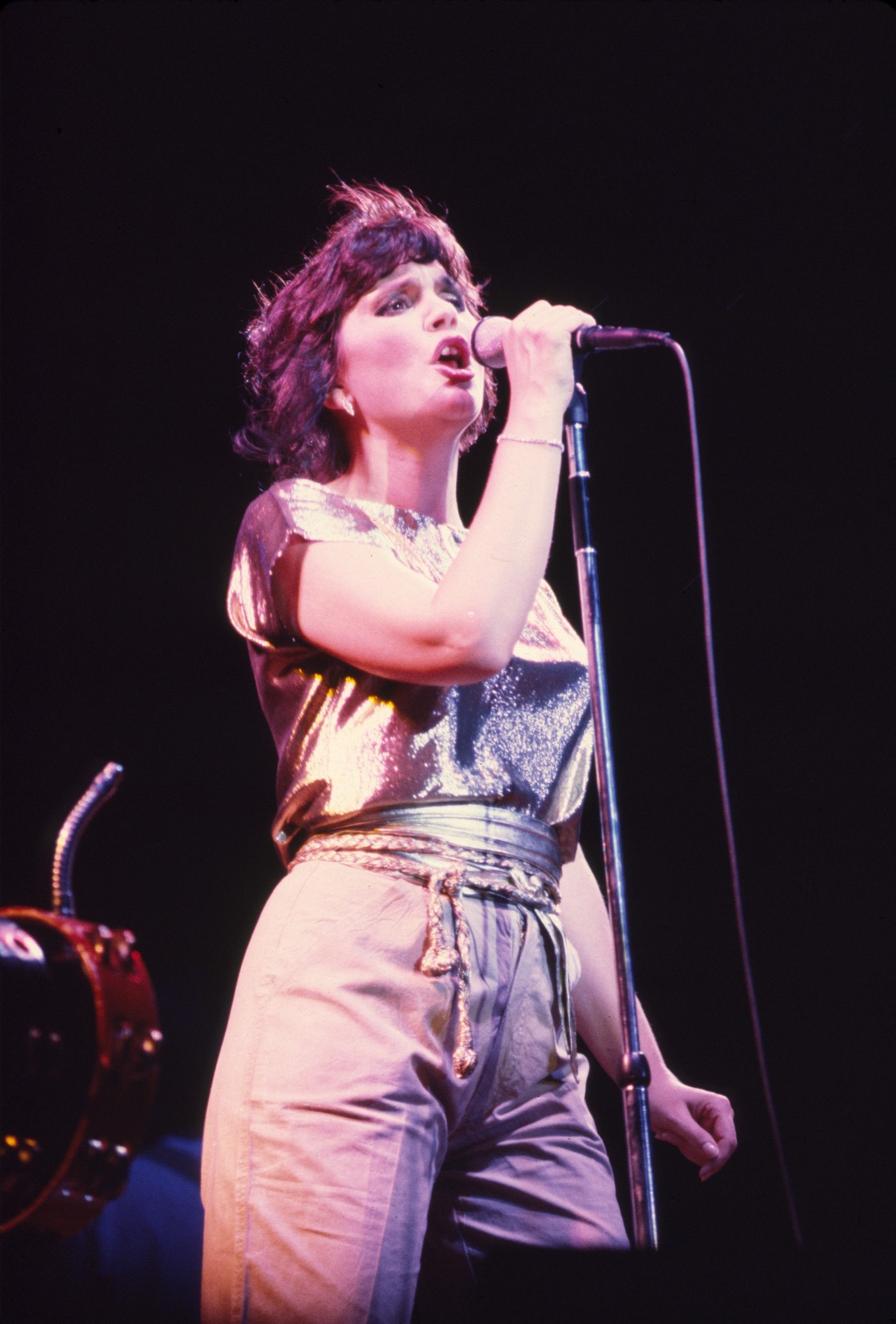
Linda Ronstadt was awarded the Latin Grammy Lifetime Achievement Award by The Latin Recording Academy in 2011.

Latin music imported from Cuba (chachachá, mambo, rumba) and Mexico (ranchera and mariachi) had brief periods of popularity during the 1950s. The earliest popular Latin music in the United States came with rumba in the early 1930s, and was followed by calypso in the mid-40s, mambo in the late 1940s and early 1950s, chachachá and charanga in the mid-50s, bolero in the late 1950s and finally boogaloo in the mid-60s, while Latin music mixed with jazz during the same period, resulting in Latin jazz and the bossa nova fusion cool jazz.

The first Mexican-Texan pop star was Lydia Mendoza, who began recording in 1934. It was not until the 1940s, however, that musica norteña became popularized by female duets like Carmen y Laura and Las Hermanas Mendoza, who had a string of regional hits. The following decade saw the rise of Chelo Silva, known as the "Queen of the (Mexican) Bolero", who sang romantic pop songs.

The 1950s saw further innovation in the Mexican-Texan community, as electric guitars, drums and elements of rock and jazz were added to conjunto. Valeria Longoria was the first major performer of conjunto, known for introducing Colombian cumbia and Mexican ranchera to conjunto bands. Later, Tony de la Rosa modernized the conjunto big bands by adding electric guitars, amplified bajo sexto and a drum kit and slowing down the frenetic dance rhythms of the style. In the mid-1950s, bandleader Isidro Lopez used accordion in his band, thus beginning the evolution of Tejano music. The rock-influenced Little Joe was the first major star of this scene. Classical music has also been influenced by Latin musicians since the begin of the 20th. century by composers such as Miguel del Aguila and Astor Piazzolla

=== Cajun and Creole music ===
Louisiana's Cajun and Creole communities saw their local music become a brief mainstream fad during the 1950s. This was largely due to the work of Clifton Chenier, who began recording for Speciality Records in 1955. He took authentic Cajun and Creole music and added more elements of rock and roll: a rollicking beat, frenetic vocals and a dance-able rhythm; the result was a style called zydeco. Chenier continued recording for more than thirty years, releasing over a hundred albums and paving the way for later stars like Boozoo Chavis and Buckwheat Zydeco.

== 1960s and 1970s ==
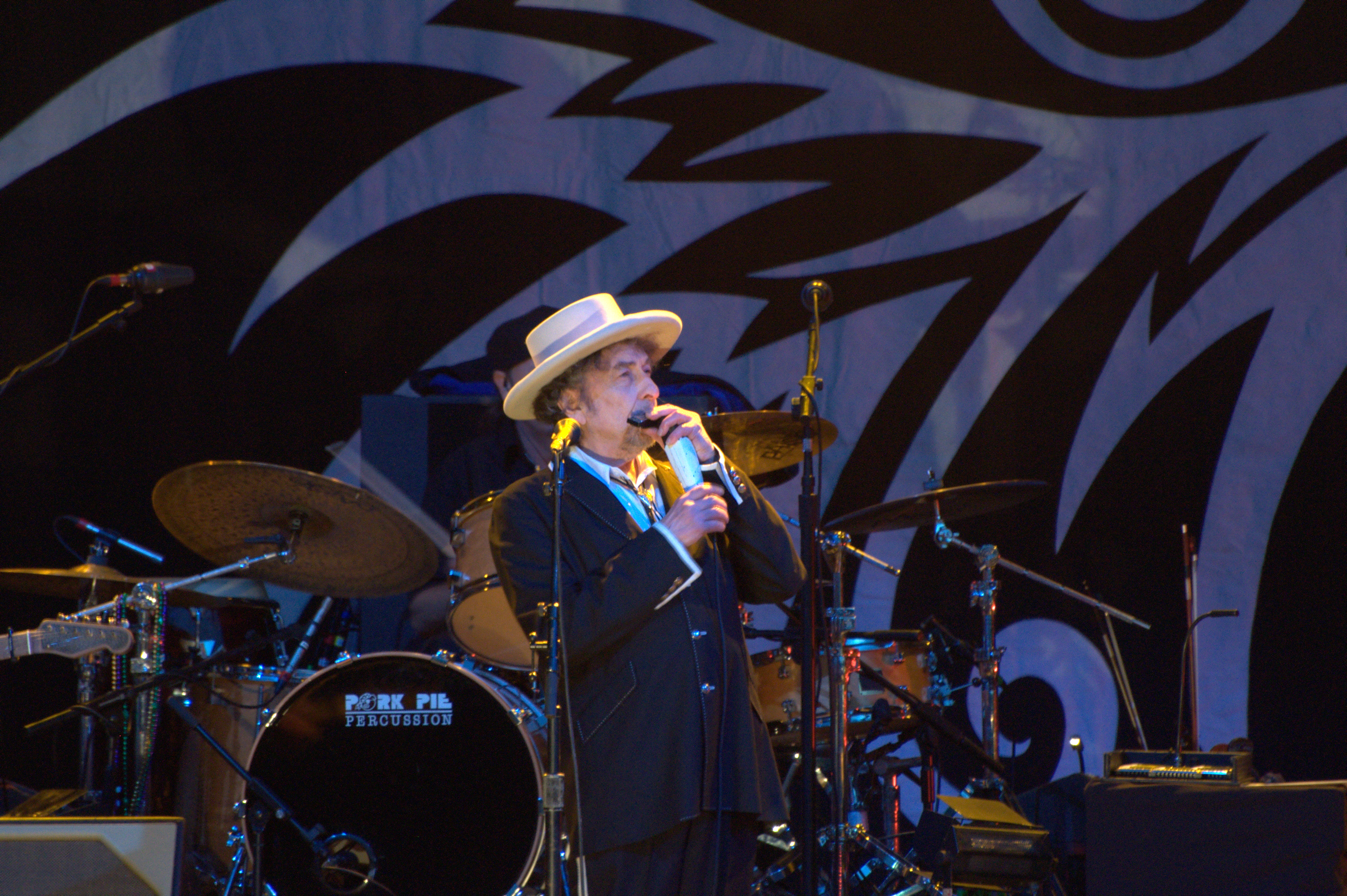
Bob Dylan performing in 2011.

In the 1960s, music became heavily involved in the burgeoning youth counter culture, as well as various social and political causes. The beginning of the decade saw the peak of doo wop's popularity, in about 1961, as well as the rise of surf, girl groups and the first soul singers. Psychedelic and progressive rock arose during this period, along with the roots of what would later become funk, hip-hop, salsa, electronic music, punk rock and heavy metal. An American roots revival occurred simultaneously as a period of sexual liberation and racial conflict, leading to growth in the lyrical maturity and complexity of popular music as songwriters wrote about the changes the country was going through.

=== Early 1960s ===
The first few years of the 1960s saw major innovation in popular music. Girl groups, surf and hot rod, and the Nashville Sound were popular, while an Appalachian folk and African American blues roots revival became dominant among a smaller portion of the listening audience. An even larger population of young audiences in the United Kingdom listened to American blues. By the middle of the decade, British blues and R&B bands like The Beatles, The Who and the Rolling Stones were topping the charts in what became known as the British Invasion, alongside newly secularized soul music and the mainstreaming of the Bakersfield Sound. Folk-based singer-songwriters like Bob Dylan also added new innovations to popular music, expanding its possibilities, such as by making singles more than the standard three minutes in length.

=== Psychedelic rock ===
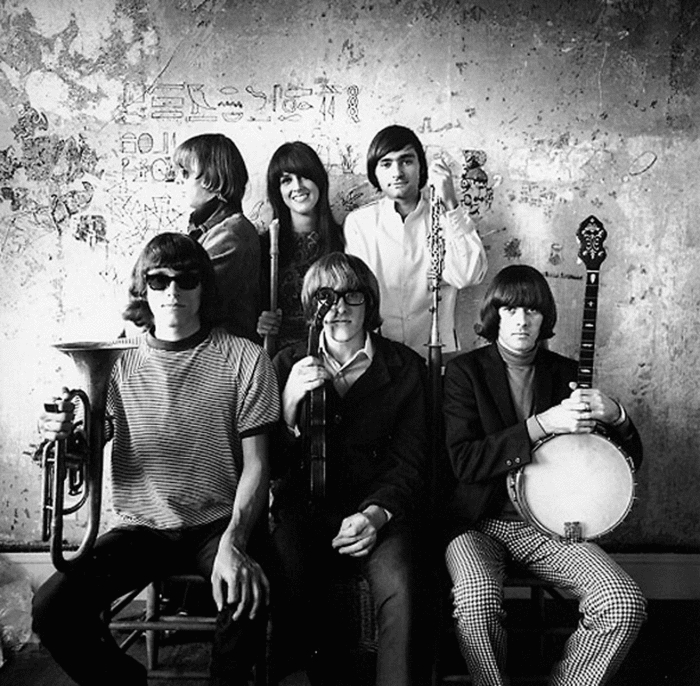
Jefferson Airplane band.

Psychedelic rock became the genre most closely intertwined with the youth culture. It arose from the British Invasion of blues in the middle of the decade, when bands like The Beatles, Rolling Stones, The Yardbirds and The Who dominated the charts and only a few American bands, such as The Beach Boys and The Mamas & the Papas, could compete. It became associated with hippies and the anti-war movement, civil rights, feminism and environmentalism, paralleling the similar rise of Afrocentric Black Power in soul and funk. Events like Woodstock became defining symbols for the generation known as the Baby Boomers, who were born immediately following World War 2 and came of age in the mid to late 1960s.

Later in the decade, psychedelic rock and the youth culture splintered. Punk rock, heavy metal, singer-songwriter and progressive rock appeared, and the connection between music and social activism largely disappeared from popular music.

Among the key venues that promoted psychedelic rock were the Matrix, the Avalon Ballroom, Fillmore Auditorium and the Berkeley Community Theater in San Francisco, The Family Dog Denver, the Grande Ballroom in Detroit, Whisky A-Go-Go and Kaleidoscope in Los Angeles, and Cafe Au Go Go in New York.

=== Soul and funk ===
From 1960s to 1970s, female soul singers like Aretha Franklin, and female pop singer Dionne Warwick and Diana Ross were popular, while innovative performers like James Brown invented a new style of soul called funk. Influenced by psychedelic rock, which was on the charts at the time, funk was a very rhythmic, dance-able kind of soul. Later in the decade and into the 1970s, funk too split into two strands. Sly & the Family Stone made pop-funk palatable for the masses, while George Clinton and his P Funk collective pioneered a new, psychedelic funk. In 1970s Kool & the Gang and the Ohio Players were popular. Album-oriented soul also appeared very late in the decade and into the next, with artists like Marvin Gaye, Al Green and Curtis Mayfield taking soul beyond the realm of the single into cohesive album-length artistic statements with a complex social conscience.

It was in this context, of album-oriented soul and funk, influenced by Black Power and the civil rights movement, that African Americans in Harlem invented hip-hop.

=== Country and folk ===
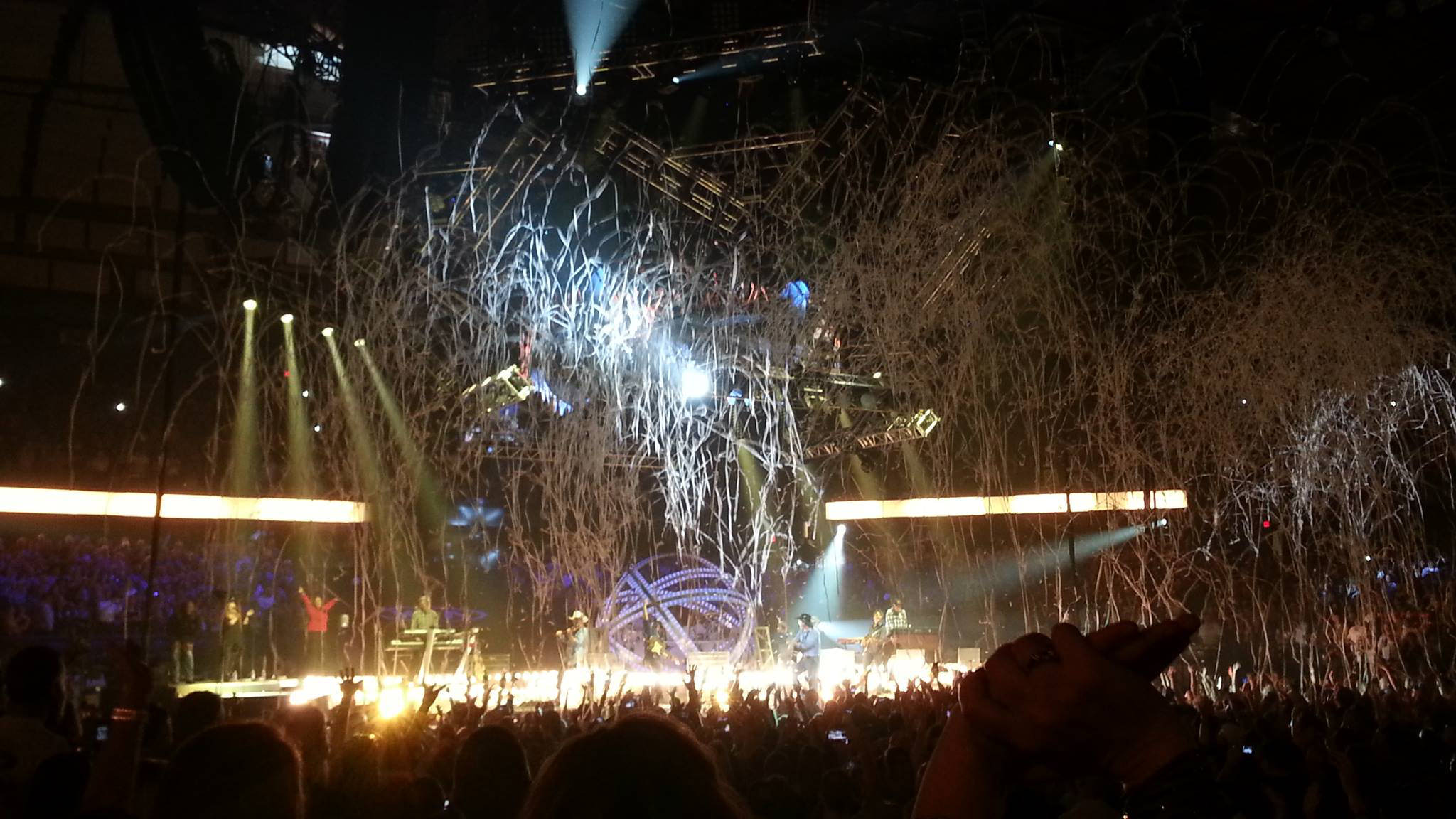
Garth Brooks performs.

Merle Haggard led the rise of the Bakersfield Sound in the 1960s, when the perceived superficiality of the Nashville Sound led to a national wave that almost entirely switched country music's capital and sound within the space of a few years. At the same time, bluegrass became a major influence on jam bands like Grateful Dead and also evolved into new, progressive genres like newgrass. As part of the nationwide roots revival, Hawaiian slack-key guitar and Cajun swamp pop also saw mainstream success.

=== Tejano ===
With the widespread success of Tony de la Rosa's big band conjunto in the late 1950s, the style became more influenced by rock and pop. Esteban Jordan's wild, improvised style of accordion became popular, paving the way for the further success of El Conjunto Bernal. The Bernal brothers' band sold thousands of albums and used faster rhythms than before.

== 1970s ==
The early 1970s saw popular music being dominated by folk-based singer-songwriters like John Denver, Carole King and James Taylor, followed by the rise of heavy metal subgenres, glam, country rock and later, disco. Philly soul and pop-funk was also popular, while world music fusions became more commonplace and a major klezmer revival occurred among the Jewish community. Beginning in the early 1970s, hip-hop arose in New York City, drawing on diverse influences from both white and black folk music, Jamaican toasting and the performance poetry of Gil Scott-Heron.

=== Heavy metal ===
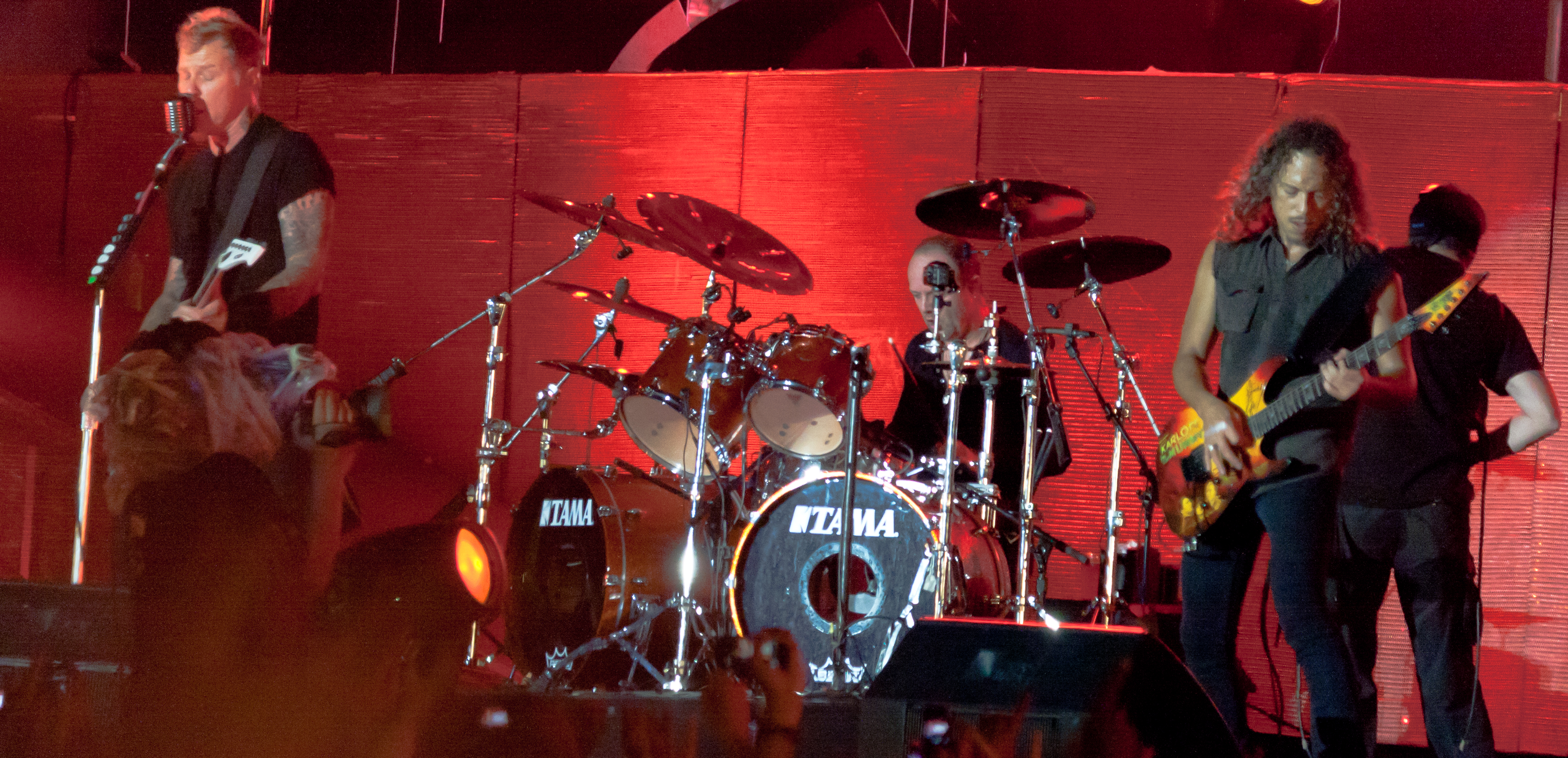
Metallica

Heavy metal's early pioneers included the British bands The Yardbirds Led Zeppelin and Black Sabbath, though American cult bands Blue Cheer and The Velvet Underground also played a major role. Their music was hard-edged and bluesy, with an often menacing tone that became more pronounced in later subgenres. In the beginning of the 1970s, heavy metal-influenced glam rock arose, and musicians like David Bowie became famous for gender-bending costumes and themes. Glam was followed by mainstream bombastic arena rock and light progressive rock bands becoming mainstream, with bands like Styx and Chicago launching popular careers that lasted most of the decade. Glam metal, a glitzy form of Los Angeles metal, also found a niche audience but limited mainstream success.

=== Outlaw country ===
With the Bakersfield Sound the dominant influence, outlaw country singers like Willie Nelson and Waylon Jennings were the biggest country stars of the 1970s, alongside country rock bands like Lynyrd Skynyrd and Allman Brothers Band who were more oriented towards crossover audiences. Later in the decade and into the next, these both mixed with other genres in the form of heartland rockers like Bruce Springsteen, while a honky tonk revival hit the country charts, led by Dwight Yoakam.

=== Hip-hop ===
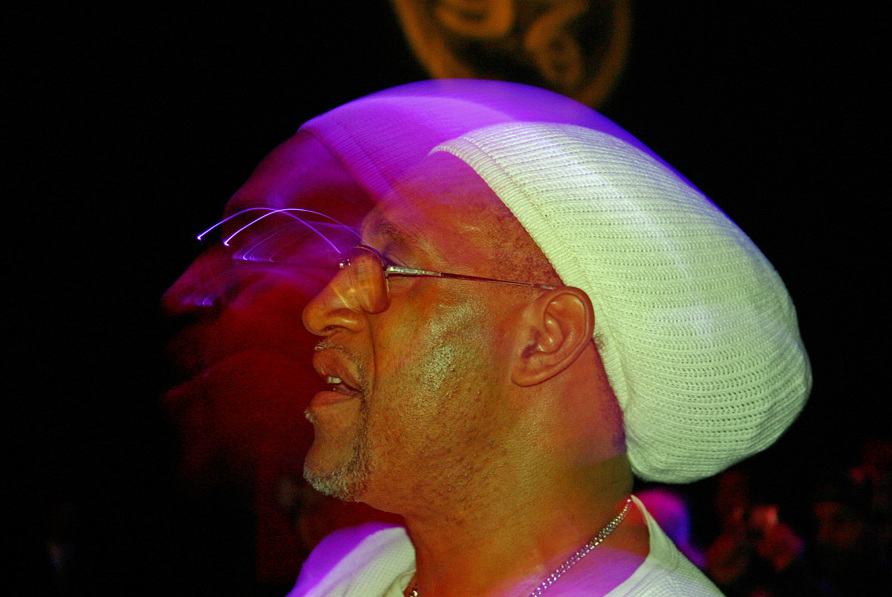
DJ Kool Herc credited with helping originate hip-hop music in the Bronx, New York City, in the 1970s.

Hip-hop was a cultural movement that began in Bronx in the early 1970s, consisting of four elements. Two of them, rapping and DJing, make up hip-hop. These two elements were imported from Jamaica by DJ Kool Herc. At neighborhood block parties, DJs would spin popular records while the audience danced. Soon, an MC arose to lead the proceedings, as the DJ began isolating and repeating the percussion breaks (the most popular, dance-able part). MCs' introductions became more and more complex, drawing on numerous African-derived vocal traditions, and became the foundation of rapping. By the end of the decade, hip-hop had spread across the country, especially in Los Angeles and Chicago.

=== Salsa ===
Cuban and Puerto Ricans in New York invented salsa in the early 1970s, using multiple sources from Latin America in the pan-Latin melting pot of the city. Puerto Rican plena and bomba and Cuban chachacha, son montuno and mambo were the biggest influences, alongside Jamaican, Mexican, Dominican, Trinidadian, Argentinian, Colombian and Brazilian sources. Many of the earliest salsa musicians, like Tito Puente, had had a long career in various styles of Latin music. Salsa grew very popular in the 1970s and into the next two decades, spreading south to Venezuela, Colombia, Puerto Rico, Mexico, Peru and especially Cuba.

=== Punk rock ===
Punk rock arose as a reaction against what had come before. Early punks believed that hollow greed had destroyed American music, and hated the perceived bombasity and arrogance of the biggest bands of the 1970s. It arose in London and New York, with numerous regional centers by the end of the decade when acts like Ramones and Patti Smith saw unprecedented success for their defiantly anti-mainstream genre. It was the British band The Clash, however, that became wildly popular, more so in the UK than the U.S., and set the stage for adoption of elements of punk in popular music in the 1980s.

== 1980s and 1990s ==
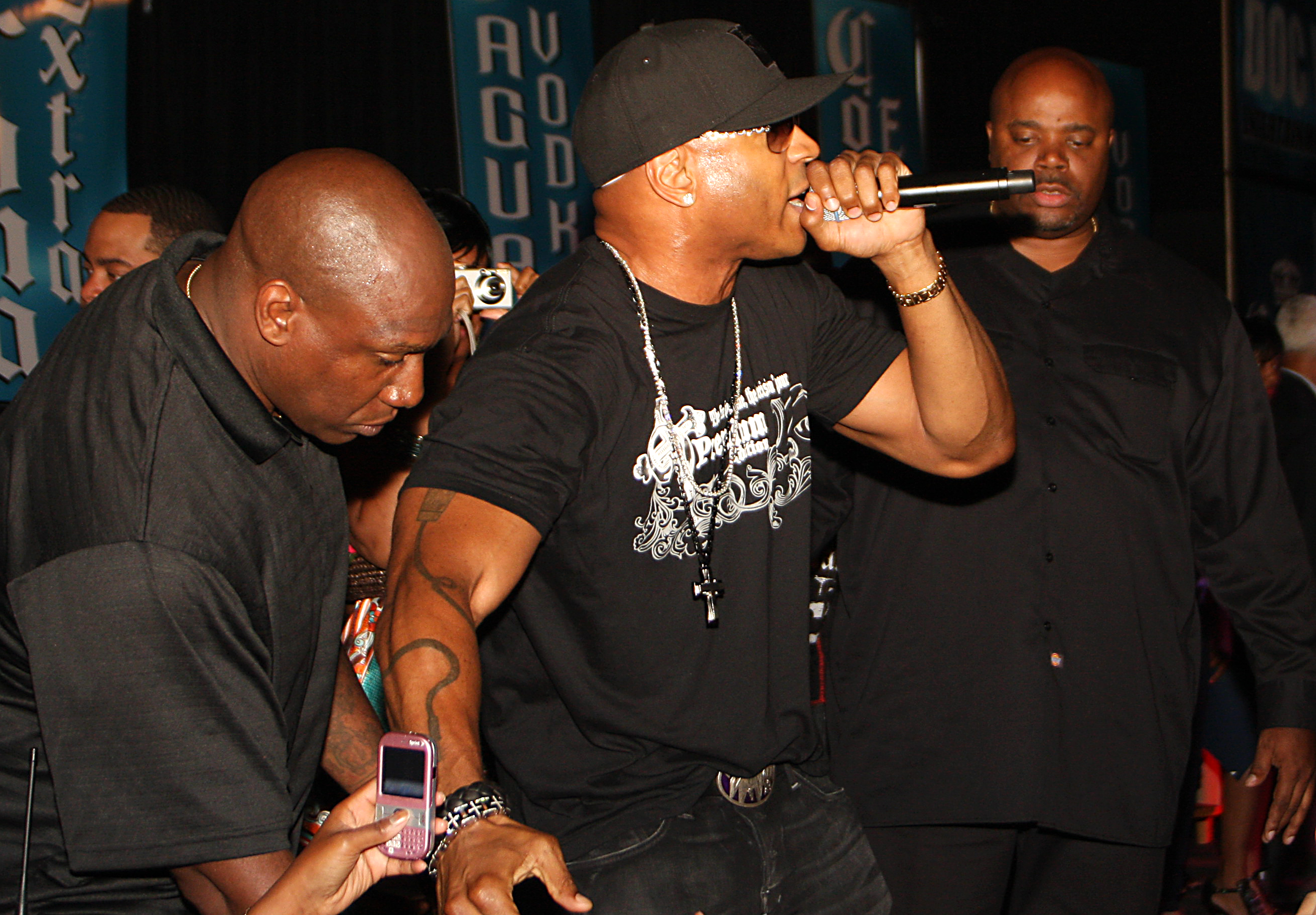
LL Cool J was one of the first rappers to have mainstream success, after his hit single "I Need a Beat" and album Radio (1985)

=== 1980s ===
The 1980s began with new wave dominating the charts, and continued through a new form of silky smooth soul, and ended with a popular glam metal trend dominating mainstream America. Meanwhile, the first glimmer of punk rock's popularity began, and new alternative rock and hardcore found niche markets.

Michael Jackson, a member of the Jackson 5 in the 1960s and 1970s, shifted to a solo music career in the later 1970s, and released the disco album Off the Wall in 1979. Produced by Quincy Jones, it was the best selling album of that year. Jackson's next solo album, Thriller (1982), was also produced by Jones, and was a mix of many pop and rock genres. The album made Jackson one of the most famous people in the world; it won seven Grammy Awards and is currently the best-selling album in history, with 34 million units sold as of 2021. The album was promoted by seven singles, and topped the Billboard 200 for 37 weeks. The singles' music videos were highly influential on the music video artform. Jackson's 1987 album Bad was also very successful.

In the 1980s, hip-hop saw its first taste of mainstream success with LL Cool J and Kurtis Blow. Meanwhile, hip-hop was continuing its spread from the East Coast to most major urban areas across the country and abroad. At the end of the decade, two albums broke the genre into the mainstream. Public Enemy's It Takes a Nation of Millions to Hold Us Back and N.W.A's Straight Outta Compton broke through with highly controversial and sometimes violent lyrics. N.W.A proved especially important, launching the career of their producer, Dr. Dre, and the dominant West Coast rap sound of the next decade. That same year (1989), De La Soul's 3 Feet High and Rising became the earliest release of alternative hip-hop, and numerous regional styles of hip-hop saw their first legitimization, including Chicago hip house, Los Angeles electroclash, Miami's bass, Washington, D.C.'s go-go and Detroit's ghettotech. Drawing inspiration from the rebellious attitudes of the Civil Rights Movement and groups like Public Enemy, many intelligent and politically minded rappers began what is known as underground hip-hop with artists like Boots Riley from The Coup leading the way.

=== 1990s ===
In December 1989, rapper Ice Cube left N.W.A. amidst a dispute with the group—particularly its manager, Jerry Heller—as Ice Cube claimed they were not paying him proper royalties. A related lawsuit was settled in 1990. Ice Cube fell out with N.W.A's members, and dissed them on various solo tracks, especially "No Vaseline", which worsened the group's reputation. In 1992, Dr. Dre left N.W.A's label, Ruthless Records, for the label he co-created, Death Row Records. This effectively ended N.W.A. On Death Row, Dr. Dre released his debut solo album The Chronic (1992), which established the G-funk style of hip-hop. G-funk is inspired by, and samples, synthesizer-based '70s funk music, like Parliament-Funkadelic (nicknamed "P-funk") and James Brown. Rapper Snoop Dogg featured on The Chronic multiple times; his own debut album, Doggystyle (1993), was another instrumental G-funk release. It was the first debut album to debut on top of the Billboard 200.

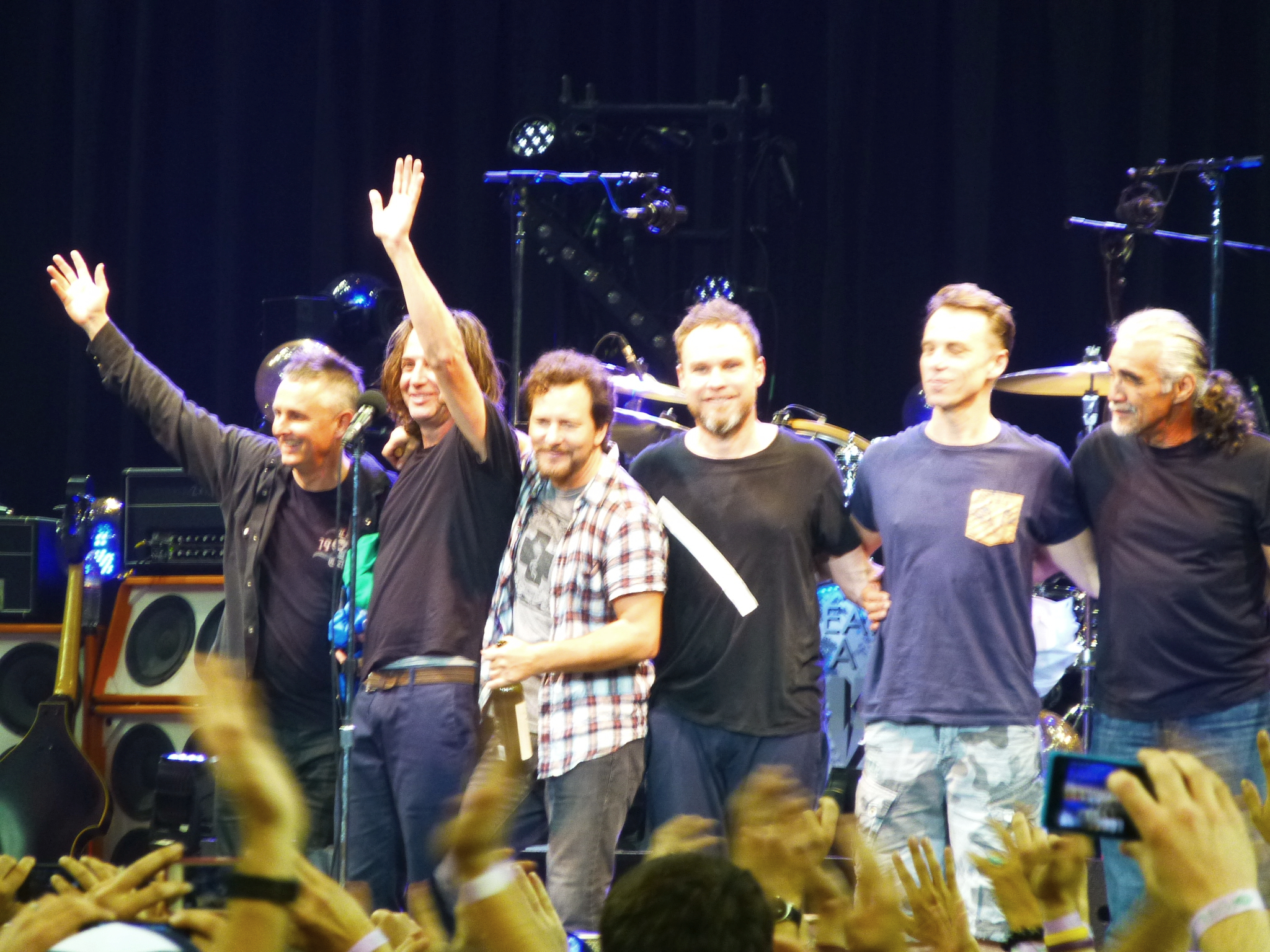
Pearl Jam

The dominance of hair metal in the 1980s ended with mainstream introduction to the grunge movement in 1991. Grunge, a mixture of heavy metal and alternative rock, as well as a fashion subculture, emerged from the late 1980s in and around Seattle. In September 1991, the album Nevermind by grunge band Nirvana released. It topped the Billboard 200 by January 1992, driven by the success of its single "Smells Like Teen Spirit". Nirvana's success popularized the grunge bands Alice in Chains, Pearl Jam, and Soundgarden. Nirvana's frontman, Kurt Cobain, became Gen X's "generational spokesperson"; his suicide on April 5, 1994, diminished the movement's popularity. Nirvana ended, and later that year, the band's drummer Dave Grohl started the rock band Foo Fighters, performing as its frontman. Britannica writes that Foo Fighters has been "one of the world’s most popular rock bands of the 21st century".

In 1993, rapper Sean Combs (also known as Puff Daddy, P. Diddy, or Diddy) founded Bad Boy Records in New York City. Rapper The Notorious B.I.G.'s influential debut album, Ready to Die, was released on Bad Boy later that year. By the mid-1990s, the popularity of West Coast hip-hop became resented by New York rappers like The Notorious B.I.G., who felt the city's historic ties to hip-hop were being outdone by an unrelated culture. This was the basis of the East Coast—West Coast hip-hop rivalry, which was symbolically led on the West Coast by Death Row executive Suge Knight and Death Row-signed rapper Tupac Shakur (or 2Pac), and on the East Coast by Sean Combs and The Notorious B.I.G. This rivalry led to violence, ending in the murder of Tupac Shakur on September 7, 1996 in Las Vegas, and the murder of The Notorious B.I.G. on March 9, 1997, in Los Angeles. Suge Knight and Sean Combs have been accused of being involved in these murders. The murders might have also been related to the decades-long Crips—Bloods gang war which has majorly taken place in L.A.

Hip-hop became an essential element of nearly all popular music during this period, resulting in new fusions like nu metal. Politically minded hip-hop in the tradition of Public Enemy and Boogie Down Productions has also diversified since the early 1990s with groups like The Coup, Sweatshop Union, Mr. Lif, Paris, Immortal Technique, and many others. Mariah Carey is credited for introducing R&B and hip-hop collaboration into mainstream pop culture, and for popularizing rap as a featuring act through her post-1995 songs.

Alanis Morissette, one of the top-selling artist of the 1990s, injected renewed popularity to singer-songwriters such as Tori Amos, Jewel, and Sarah McLachlan. In the wake of grunge and gangsta rap came a fusion of soul and hip-hop, called neo soul, some popularity for British Britpop and the rise of bands like Sublime and No Doubt, playing a form of pop punk influenced by Jamaican ska and British two tone ska/punk fusionists from the early 1980s. Techno also became popular, though not as much as in other countries.

== 21st century ==
=== 2000s ===
At the turn of the millennium, pop artists like Backstreet Boys and Britney Spears were dominating the charts, many of them in Latin pop (Shakira, Ricky Martin). Rappers like Jay-Z and Eminem were huge stars. Some garage rock revivalists like The White Stripes and The Hives became highly hyped bands in the indie rock field, and achieved substantial mainstream success.

A simplified diagram of a peer-to-peer (P2P) file sharing network, in which a computer receives files directly from other computers

By 2000, MP3 players, portable devices which can play MP3 files, were a popular method of music listening. This threatened the music industry, as MP3 files could easily be pirated through peer-to-peer (P2P) file sharing applications like Napster or LimeWire. The Record Industry Association of America (RIAA), the American music industry's advocacy organization; Dr. Dre; and Metallica independently sued Napster, who had 100,000 users after launching in 1999. Metallica's lawsuit was influenced by their song "I Disappear" leaking on the site before it officially released. They asked Napster to ban 300,000 users who had pirated one of their songs; many fans stopped supporting Metallica, viewing them as greedy and out-of-touch. Dr. Dre and Metallica settled with Napster. The RIAA won their suit, and Napster was court-ordered to locate and delete files of copyrighted songs; they were unable to comply with this, and shut down in 2001.

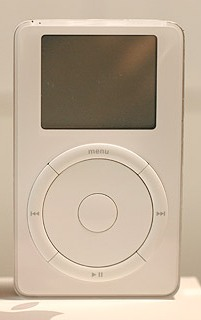
The iPod (pictured) and iTunes stopped widespread music piracy

Around this time, Steve Jobs, the CEO of American company Apple, asked engineer Jon Rubinstein to create a more "minimalist, user-friendly" MP3 player than what was on the market. The resulting product was the iPod: released in 2001, it could store 1,000 instantly-playable songs, significantly more than its competitors. Users could also download songs to their iPod that they had purchased from the iTunes Store, an online music marketplace launched in 2003; these songs stayed on iTunes, a library shared between a user's iPod and Mac or PC. This was more convenient than pirating through P2P networks, so many listeners started downloading songs legally off iTunes, despite to having to pay for them now. Apple spent millions on marketing the iPod as a product for "cool people" instead of music "thieves". The music industry's piracy problem was solved, while CD sales went down because people did not have to leave their house to get music.

Taylor Swift, who grew up in Pennsylvania and Tennessee, quickly found success in pop country music in the 2000s. She began her career making country music in Nashville, and in 2006, she released her first album, Taylor Swift, which went platinum by the end of 2007. Her second album, Fearless (2008), debuted atop the Billboard 200, and its singles "Love Story" and "You Belong with Me" were highly successful as digital downloads.

In the late 1990s and early 2000s, Kanye West became a prolific hip-hop producer, producing many tracks on Jay-Z's album The Blueprint (2001). West became a major rapper with his debut album The College Dropout (2004), which, Britannica writes, had "sonic sophistication and clever wordplay, which blended humor, faith, insight, and political awareness". At the 2009 MTV Video Music Awards, as Taylor Swift accepted the award for Best Female Video for "You Belong with Me", West went on stage and proclaimed that the video for Beyonce's "Single Ladies (Put a Ring on It)"—Swift's competition in the category—was "one of the best videos of all time". This was viewed as "career suicide" for West, but he "shift[ed] the narrative" with the release of his album My Beautiful Dark Twisted Fantasy (2010), which received "near-unanimous critical acclaim".

=== 2010s ===
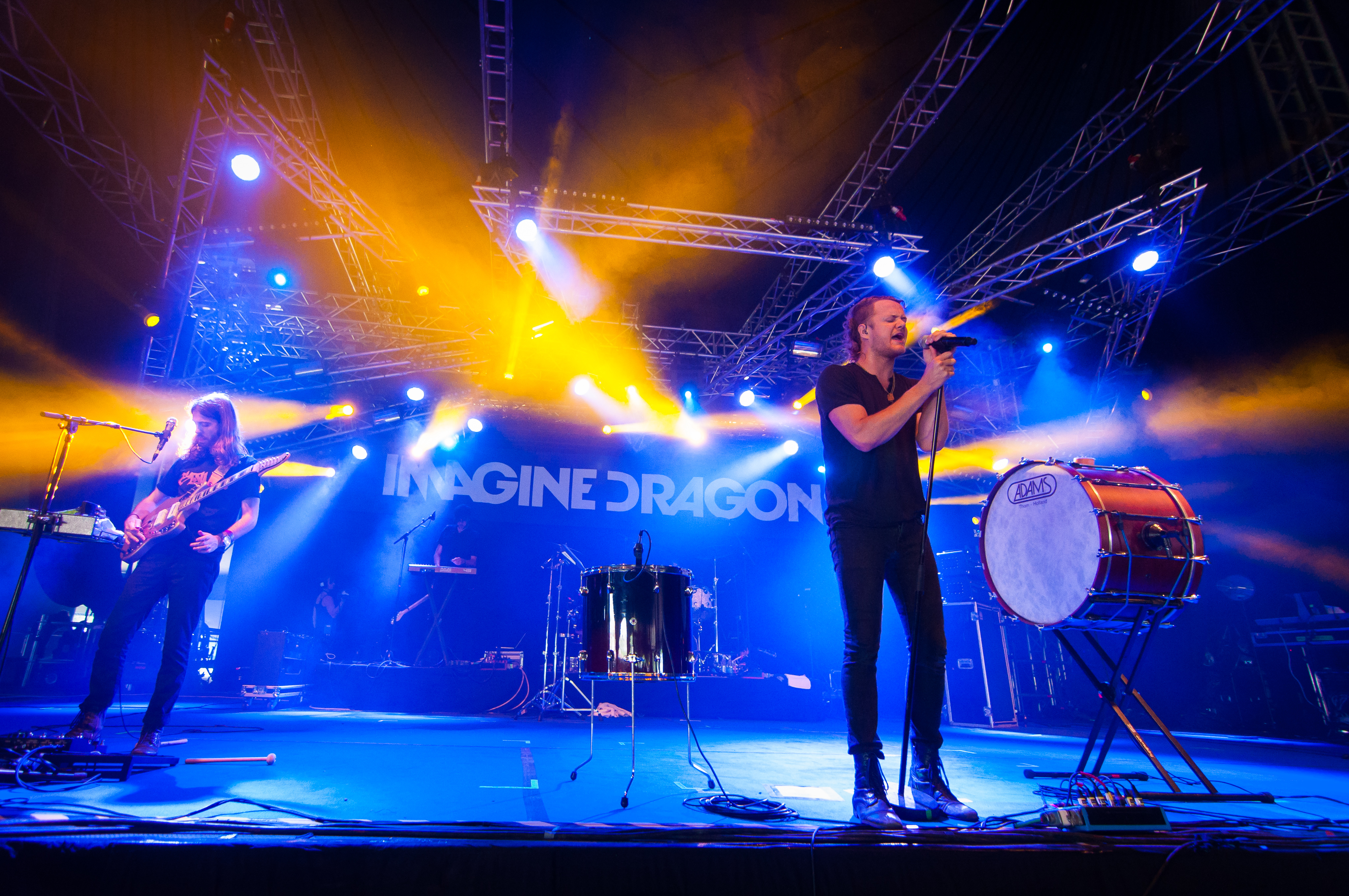
Imagine Dragons were an instant success after the release of their debut album, Night Visions.

Music streaming services give users a large library of music for a paid recurring subscription, and song streams are calculated into royalties that the services pay the artists. Services such as Pandora, Spotify, Apple Music, Google Play Music, Amazon Music, or YouTube Music became the most popular way to listen to music in the 2010s; the RIAA said that 7% of U.S. music sales in 2010 were from streaming services, which grew to 80% in 2019. However, royalties given to artists were very low; for example, in 2024, Spotify gave artists approximately £0.0031 per stream. In order to make up for declining revenues compared to the iTunes-era market, artists started increasing the prices of live shows. In 2022, the price of shows increased even further because venues were paying more for gas and electricity, as fuel cost more worldwide following the Russian invasion of Ukraine.

In 2017, hip-hop became the most popular genre of music in America, surpassing rock. One of the most popular rappers of recent years has been Kendrick Lamar. His album To Pimp a Butterfly (2015) was widely acclaimed, and is the highest-rated album of all time on the database Rate Your Music, as an average of user ratings. Lamar's album Damn (2017) was the first work of music outside of classical music or jazz to win the Pulitzer Prize for Music. In 2018, Highsnobiety labeled Death Grips, a hip-hop and rock band from California, as perhaps "the most important hip-hop act of the decade", in that they were highly influential despite not being the scene's most popular act. They made experimental and noisy music that was very divisive.

Trap music, an electronic subgenre of hip-hop, has had a significant scene in the Southern U.S. since the 2010s. Southern rappers who use trap beats, such as 2 Chainz, 21 Savage, Cardi B, Future, and Playboi Carti, were some of the biggest artists of the decade nationwide. Trap inspired and fed into different scenes such as electronic dance music (EDM) and drill. Chicago's drill scene became popular through rapper Chief Keef. By 2018, amidst a nationwide opioid epidemic, American hip-hop was noted to have a problem of romanticizing opioid use, while many rappers such as Lil Peep and Mac Miller died from opioid overdoses.

=== 2020s ===
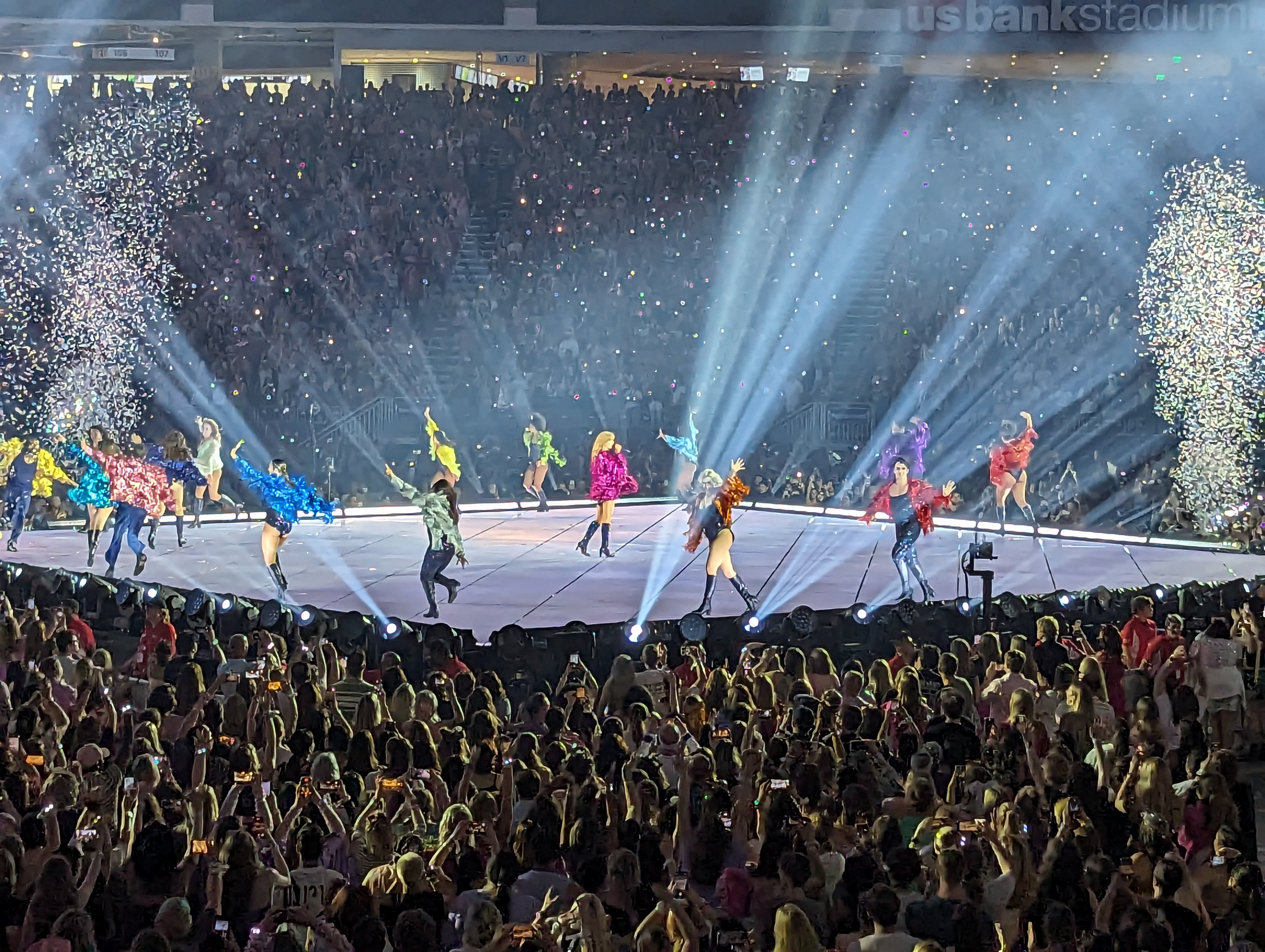
Taylor Swift's Eras Tour (2023-2024), pictured here in Minneapolis, gave a noticeable boost to the U.S. economy

Ever since Fearless, Taylor Swift's popularity grew to where, in 2023, GQ referred to her as "probably the most famous person in the world". Her worldwide Eras Tour, which began that year, was so successful it gave a noticeable boost to the U.S. economy. In 2024, when Swift won the Grammy Award for Album of the Year for Midnights (2022), she became the first person to win in that category four times.

In the 2020s, the popularity of TikTok, a video-based social media platform, widely affected the U.S. music industry. Licensed songs can be added to any video before posting, leading to relatively unknown songs going viral. The industry has promoted through the platform, though they have a difficult relationship: some musicians claim they are not properly compensated for TikTok streams; some artists signed to labels dislike being obligated to make TikTok videos; and songs with AI-generated vocals of living artists have gone viral there.

== See also ==
- Music history of the United States in the 1950s
- Music history of the United States in the 1960s
- Music history of the United States in the 1970s
- Music history of the United States in the 1980s
- Music history of the United States in the 1990s
- Music history of the United States in the 2000s
- Music history of the United States in the 2010s
- Music history of the United States in the 2020s
