= Benjamin Cross (disambiguation) =

Benjamin Cross was a composer.

Ben(jamin) Cross may also refer to:

- Benny Cross (1898–1986), footballer
- Ben Cross (1947–2020), Harold Abrahams actor in 1981 film Chariots of Fire
- Ben Cross (rugby league) (born 1978), Australian rugby league footballer
