= George Schetky =

American composer

George Schetky (June 1, 1776 – December 11, 1831) was an American composer. Schetky was a violoncellist, music teacher, conductor, and one of the first American composers. He was also a music publisher with Benjamin Carr as his partner.

Born in Edinburgh, Scotland, he emigrated to Philadelphia in 1787. In 1812, Schetky returned to Scotland, in protest to the War of 1812 since the war was against his native country. He returned to Philadelphia after the war in 1817.

He was one of the founding members of The Musical Fund Society.

== Publications ==
The Musical Journal for the Piano Forte.
