= Benjamin Cross =

Benjamin Cross (September 15, 1786 – March 1, 1857), was a conductor, singer, organist, and one of the first American composers.

Cross was born in Philadelphia, Pennsylvania. His teachers included Benjamin Carr and Raynor Taylor. Benjamin Cross was one of the founding members of The Musical Fund Society as well as being one of its first directors. Benjamin Cross was grandfather to Michael H. Cross (1833-1897) who became a notable conductor in Philadelphia.

== List of works ==
- Strike the Harp in Praise of God - treble solo & chorus
- A Mother's Love - arranged for the piano forte
