= The Musical Fund Society =

The Musical Fund Society is one of the oldest musical societies in the United States founded in February 1820 by Benjamin Carr, Raynor Taylor, George Schetky and Benjamin Cross, and the painter Thomas Sully. Its first public concert on April 22, 1821 and featured Beethoven’s 2nd Symphony.

== Musical Fund Hall ==
The Musical Fund Hall, 808 Locust Street in Philadelphia, is a landmark home of the society.
