= Universal Circulating Music Library =

Music publishers' lending library

Universal Circulating Music Library was a type of music publishers' lending library established in the United Kingdom in the 1850s and 1860s. By the 1920s, no significant such circulating libraries by music publishers had survived, probably due to reduced demand. Most of the housed music collections in such publisher-run libraries was lost, with only some still found in music publishers' archives.

== Messrs. Scheurmann & Co. ==
Messrs. Scheurmann & Co. were probably the first music publisher in the United Kingdom to start a Universal Circulating Music Library in 1855. An announcement at the time stated: "The catalogue contains more than 42,042 separately numbered works, embracing almost every English and Foreign publication, under various headings and subdivisions. [...] [Most music reference libraries] labor under the serious disadvantage of being confined to either one class of musical works, or—as in the case of the British Museum—of being available only to those who can go from home to study." It had an annual subscription fee and a printed catalog could be purchased separately.

== Novello, Ewer & Co. ==
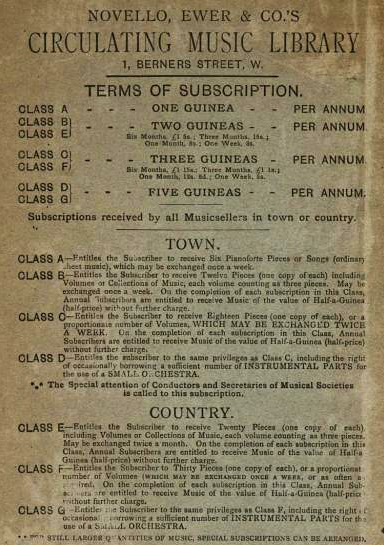
An 1890 advertisement for the Novello, Ewer & Co. Circulating Music Library.

The Universal Circulating Music Library provided by Novello, Ewer & Co. dates back to 1868. The preface of the first catalogue states: "This Library, which was established, and has been most successfully carried on since 1859, by Messrs. Ewer and Co., has been purchased by Messr. Novello and Co., and will be continued by them under the style of Novello, Ewer and Co." The terms of subscription and the regulations of use are given on the next page.
