= The Kentucky Volunteer =

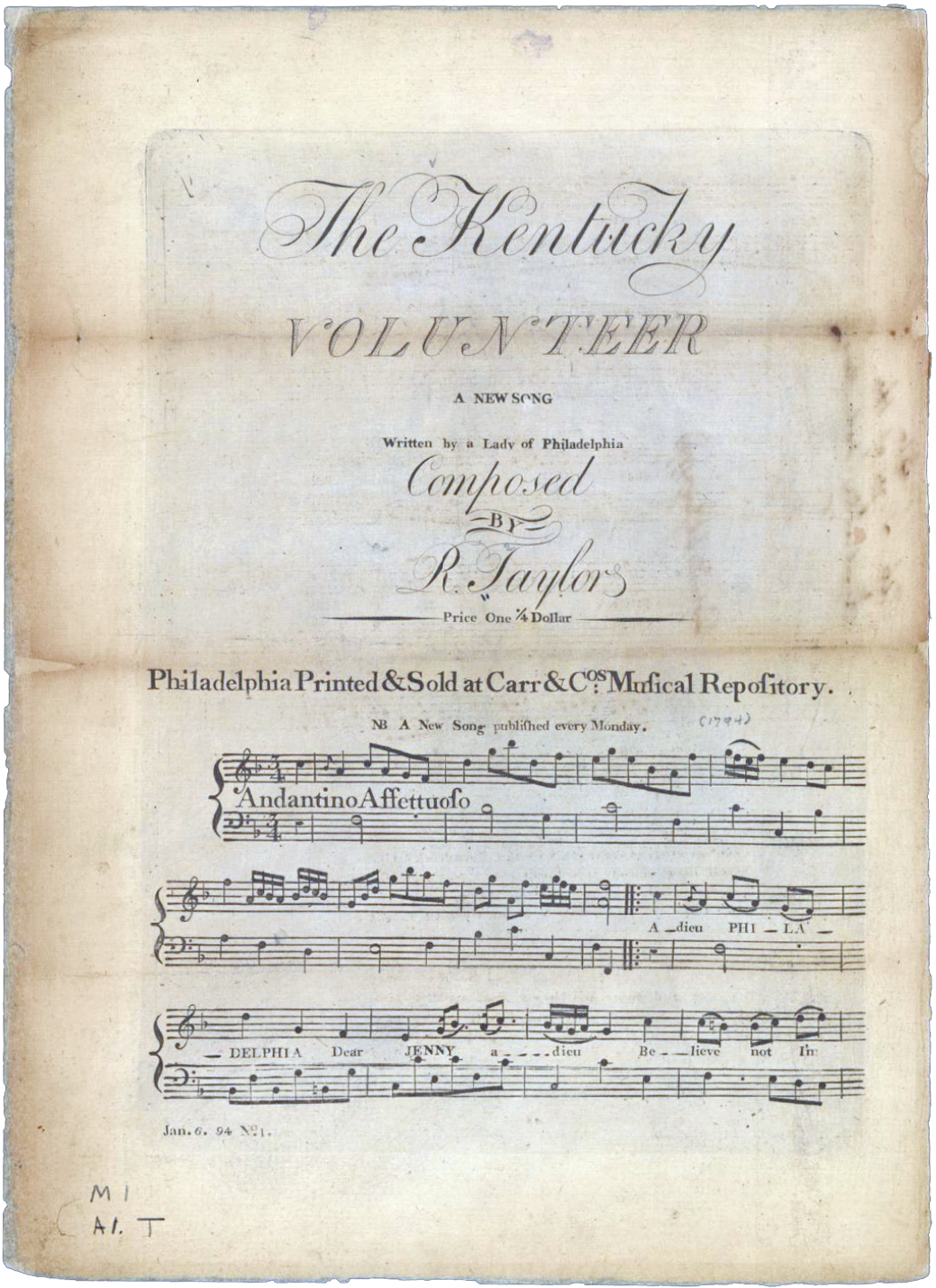
- A print of the original sheet music for "The Kentucky Volunteer," 1794

Song
- Published: January 6, 1794
- Label: Carr & Co. Musical Repository
- Composer(s): Raynor Taylor
- Lyricist(s): "A Lady of Philadelphia"

"The Kentucky Volunteer" is a song published in the United States on January 6, 1794. Its music was composed by Raynor Taylor and its lyrics by "a Lady of Philadelphia". It is noteworthy for being the first musical composition copyrighted under the new United States Constitution. It was also the first work published by Benjamin Carr, an English musician who had just immigrated to Philadelphia from England, to become the country's most prolific printer of music in that decade. The actual identity of the lyricist remains a mystery.

== Description ==
The song was published by Benjamin Carr as part of a series of songs "published every Monday", sheet music available for "One/4 Dollar" ($1.25) each. It was composed by a fellow English immigrant and friend of Carr's, Raynor Taylor, who had arrived in the U.S. two years before Carr. The series may not have been especially successful, as it lasted only five weeks. The other four songs in the series were not copyrighted, three being popular songs from London musicals, and the fourth a piano exercise by Alexander Reinagle, another English immigrant and friend of Carr's.

The song is written, as originally published, in F major. Its lyrics begin:

Adieu, Philadelphia, /
Dear Jenny adieu.
Believe not I'm false /
in thus parting from you.
Tis honor compels /
for the sake of my dear
to Kentucky I go /

as a bold volunteer

Final page of the original sheet music, for "German Flute" and for "Guittar"

The original music included brief examples transcribed into G major for "the German Flute" and C major for "the Guittar".

== Copyright ==
The US Constitution had a section authorizing the Federal government to grant a monopoly to authors and inventors, for a limited time. The Copyright Act of 1790 covered only "maps, charts, and books" for 14 years, renewable one time. This means that actual music was not intended to be covered, but printed sheet music counted as "a book", and in early 1794 Carr acted on this fact and got his print of "The Kentucky Volunteer" copyrighted.
