= Raynor Taylor =

American composer (1747–1825)

Raynor Taylor (1747 – 17 August 1825) was an English organist, music teacher, composer, and singer who lived and worked in the United States after emigrating in 1792. Active in composing music for the theater, outdoor pleasure garden, and the Anglican Church and Protestant Episcopal Church of the United States, he was one of the first notable composers active in America.

== Biography ==
Raynor Taylor was born in Soho, in Westminster, London, England, between August and November 1747. As a boy he sang in the choir at the Chapel Royal for many years, notably singing at the funeral of George Frideric Handel in 1759. Music historian J. R. Parker reported that Taylor's hat accidentally dropped into the composer's grave during the funeral ceremony. He studied organ, singing, and music composition with Samuel Arnold in London as a teenager, and at the age of eighteen became the organist at Chelmsford. In 1765 he was appointed the resident composer and musical director for the Sadler's Wells Theatre and the Marylebone Gardens, serving in both positions for more than 25 years.

In 1792 Taylor immigrated to the United States, partially due to the encouragement of his pupil Alexander Reinagle. He initially settled in Baltimore where he taught music and gave musical extravaganzas. Music historian O. G. Sonneck wrote of these concerts, "As a specialty he cultivated burlesque olios or 'extravaganzas' which came dangerously near being music hall skits." Taylor then briefly worked as the organist for St Anne's Church in Annapolis before moving to Philadelphia in 1795 to become the organist at St. Peter's Church, serving in that capacity until 1813. He also is noteworthy for having the first sheet music published under US copyright, "The Kentucky Volunteer" in 1794, his friend Benjamin Carr as the publisher.

Taylor became one of the major figures in the musical life of Philadelphia during the first quarter of the nineteenth century. He was one of the most sought after music teachers in the city and was active both as a performer and composer in the church and the theatre. He moved in the most important musical circles in Philadelphia, counting among his close friends Benjamin Carr, J. G. Schetky, and his former pupil Alexander Reinagle. He was one of the founding members of the Musical Fund Society in 1820. As a performer he was particularly admired for his organ improvisations as well as for his renditions of comic theatre songs. He died in Philadelphia on 17 August 1825 and was buried at St. Peter's Church.

== Works ==
Taylor's extant instrumental works are chiefly pedagogical piano pieces. Of greater interest are his church anthems, glees and particularly the theatrical songs which show a gift for setting comic texts. His one complete extant American theatrical score, The Aethiop, based on William Dimond's oriental drama The Aethiop, or Child of the Desert (London 1813), has vocal and instrumental parts of great vitality. The scholar, Victor Fell Yellin, wrote about Raynor Taylor's theatrical work, "His overture to The Aethiop is perhaps the finest theatrical overture that has survived from the Federal period."

=== Selected works ===
- Capocchio and Dorinna, (1793)
- Old Woman of Eighty Three (1793)
- The Kentucky Volunteer (1794)
- The American Captives Emancipation (1806)
- The Beech Tree's Petition / the words by Campbell (1810 and 1815)
- Bonny Willy / the words by Mr. C. Harford (1798 and 1804)
- The Camel's Bell (1813 or 1814)
- Hark Hark the Joy Inspiring Horn (1805 and 1809)
- The Lass of the Cot (1795)
- Ma Chere, et Mon Cher (1798 and 1804)
- The Queen of Flowers: as sung at the Amateurs concert by Mr. Gillingham (1812)
- Rustic Festivity (1807 and 1811)
- The Wand'ring Village Maid (1795)
- When Death's Gloomy Angel Was Bending His Bow (1814)
- The Wounded Soldier (1794)
- The Iron-Chest
- The Shipwreck'd Mariner
- Monody (1799)
- Buxom Joan (1778)

Songs

- Amyntor: a pastoral song (1795)
- The Merry Piping Lad: a ballad in the Scots taste (1795)
- Nancy of the Vale: a pastoral ballad (1795)
- Vive la Liberté: a new song (1795)
- While the Morn is Inviting to Love: a favorite song (1797 and 1799)

Operas

- Pizarro, or The Spaniards in Peru (opera, 1800)
- The Aethiop, or The Child of the Desert (opera, 1813, premiered on January 1, 1814)
