= Benjamin Carr =

American singer (1768–1831)

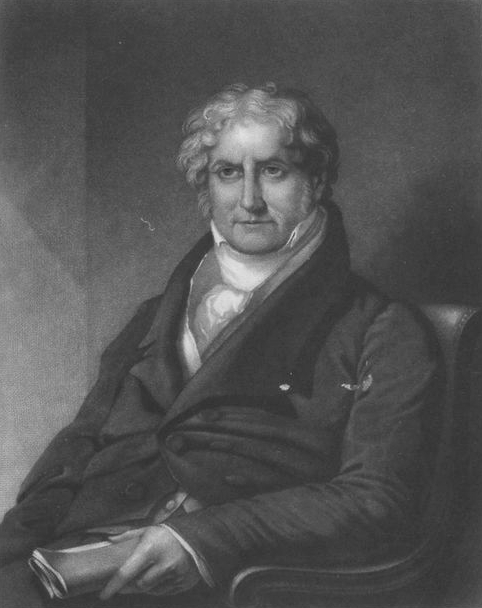
Benjamin Carr by John Sartain after John Clarendon Darley

Benjamin Carr (September 12, 1768 – May 24, 1831) was an American composer, singer, teacher, and music publisher.

== Biography ==
Born in London, he was the son of Joseph Carr and older brother of Thomas Carr. He was also the nephew of his namesake Benjamin Carr (1731–80), who ran an instrument-making and repair shop in London for over 20 years.

He studied organ with Charles Wesley and composition with Samuel Arnold. In 1793 he traveled to Philadelphia with a stage company, and a year later went with the same company to New York, where he stayed until 1797. Later that year he moved to Philadelphia, where he became a prominent member of the city’s musical life.

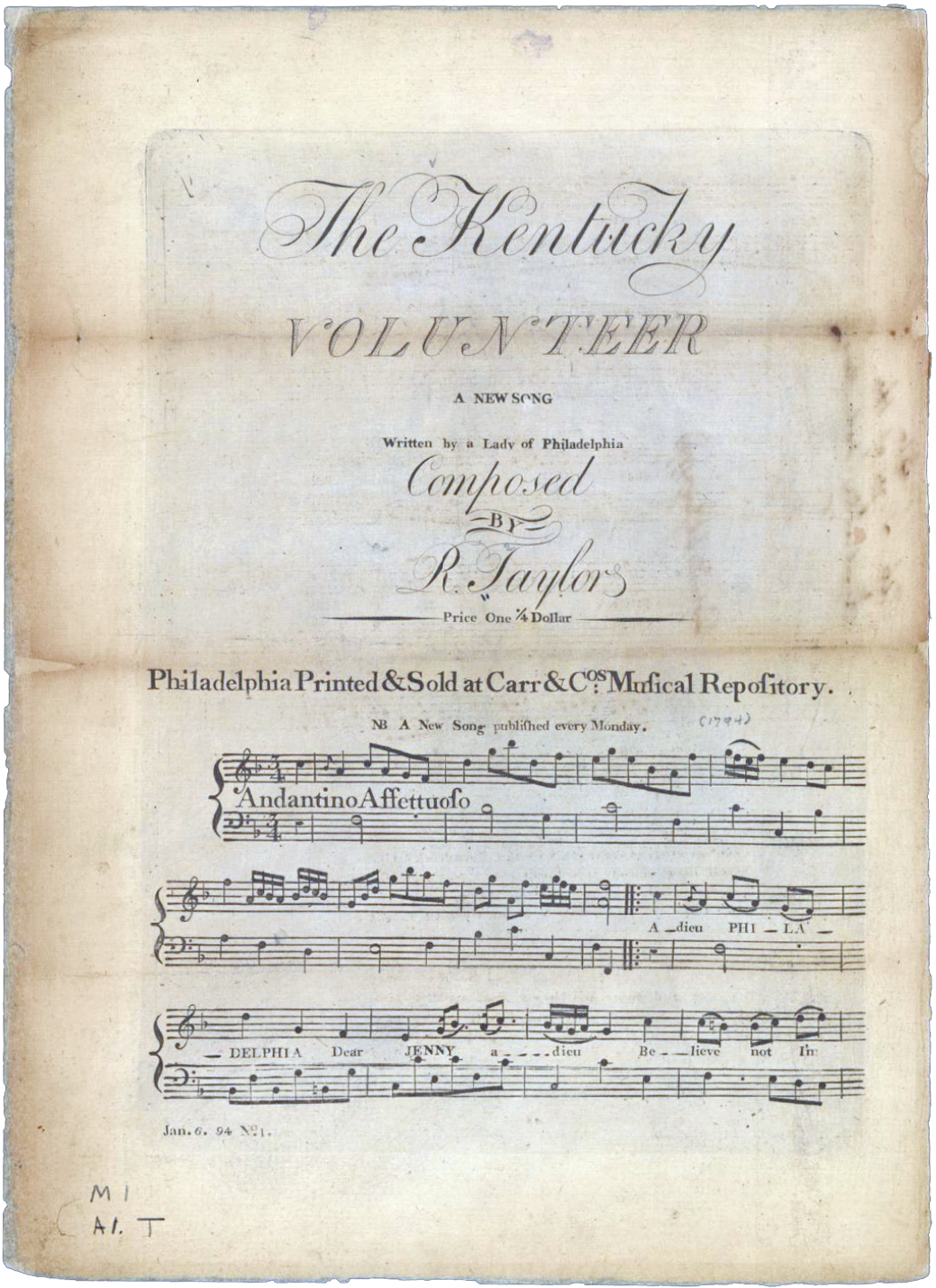
Carr published the very first sheet music covered by copyright under the new United States Constitution, The Kentucky Volunteer.

He was "decidedly the most important and prolific music publisher in America during the 1790s (as well as one of its most distinguished composers), conducting, in addition to his Philadelphia business, a New York branch from 1794 to 1797, when it was acquired by James Hewitt". In 1794 he began publishing "a new song every Monday". The initial offering, The Kentucky Volunteer, is noteworthy as the first song copyrighted under the new US Constitution. This song was composed by Carr's friend and fellow English immigrant, Raynor Taylor. This particular "each Monday" series, however, only lasted 5 weeks.

Carr was well-known as a teacher of keyboard and singing, and he served as organist and choirmaster at St Augustine's Catholic Church (1801–31) and at St Peter's Episcopal Church (1816–31). In 1820 he was one of the principal founders of the Musical Fund Society of Philadelphia, and he is known as the "Father of Philadelphia Music". Mrs. French, who had achieved a degree of fame as a singer, was one of his students.

== Music ==
Carr's best known orchestral work was the Federal Overture (1794), composed for theatrical audiences.

He published many of own 61 art songs in two serial anthologies, the Musical Journal for the Piano Forte (1800–04) and Carr’s Musical Miscellany in Occasional Numbers (1812–25). Also among his songs are several sets of ballads, including Six Ballads from The Lady of the Lake op.7, published in the same year (1810) as the poem by Sir Walter Scott on which they are based; the set contains the Hymn to the Virgin ("Ave Maria"), which is especially notable for its harp-like arpeggiated accompaniment. Carr’s most popular song was “The Little Sailor Boy” (1798). He was perhaps the first American composer to set a Shakespeare text to music, and his Hymn to the Virgin (1810) is generally considered one of the finest early American songs.

His piano music includes shorter sonatas, rondos and variation forms; much of it was written for pedagogical purposes, although a few works are more technically advanced. He also wrote several important pedagogical works, including the Lessons and Exercises in Vocal Music (c.1811) and The Analytical Instructor for the Piano Forte (1826).

== Compositions ==
printed works published in Philadelphia unless otherwise stated

Works for the stage

- Philander and Silvia, or Love Crown'd at Last (pastoral opera), London, Sadler's Wells, 16 Oct 1792
- The Caledonian Frolic (ballet), Philadelphia, New, 26 Feb 1794
- Irish Lili (ballet), Philadelphia, New, 9 July 1794
- Macbeth (incidental music), New York, 14 Jan 1795
- Poor Jack (ballet), New York, 7 April 1795
- The Archers (opera, W. Dunlap), New York, John Street, 18 April 1796
- Gavotte

Arrangements of English operas with additional music by Carr

- S. Arnold: Children in the Wood, Philadelphia, 24 Nov 1794
- C. Dibdin: The Deserter, New York, 19 May 1795
- Linn: Bourneville Castle, New York, 16 Jan 1797 [music by Arne]
- Holcroft: The Spanish Barber, 1800
- Misc. opera arias and incidental music

Songs and misc. vocal works

- Four Ballads (W. Shakespeare, J.E. Harwood) (1794)
- Three Ballads, op.2 (1799)
- Six Ballads from … The Lady of the Lake (W. Scott), op.7 (1810)
- Lessons and Exercises in Vocal Music, op.8 (Baltimore, ?1811)
- Four Ballads from … Rokeby (Scott), op.10 (Baltimore, 1813)
- The History of England, op.11 (Baltimore, ?1814)
- Musical Bagatelles, op.13 (c1820)
- Six Canzonets, op.14 (1824)
- numerous single songs

Instrumental works

- Federal Overture, piano (1794)
- Six sonatas, piano (1796)
- Dead March and Monody for General Washington, piano and vocal score (Baltimore, 1799/1800)
- Three divertimentos, in Musical Journal for the Piano Forte, i (1800)
- Voluntary, organ (?1801)
- The Siege of Tripoli: Historical Naval Sonata, piano, op.4 (1804)
- Applicazione adolcita, piano, op.6 (1809)
- Six Progressive Sonatinas, piano, violin/flute ad lib, op.9 (Baltimore, ?1812)
- The Analytical Instructor, piano, op.15 (1826)
- further single works, including marches, waltzes, variations, etc.

Collections and editions

- Musical Journal for the Piano Forte (1800–04) [piano music and songs]
- Masses, Vespers, Litanies, Hymns, Psalms, Anthems & Motets (1805)
- Carr's Musical Miscellany
- Occasional Numbers (1812–25) [pf music and songs]
- A Collection of Chants and Tunes for the Episcopal Churches of Philadelphia (1816)
- The Chorister (1820)
- Lyricks (1825)
- Le clavecin (1825)
- Sacred Airs, in Six Numbers (1830)
