= Keith Terry =

- Born: November 22, 1951 (age 74); Waxahachie, Texas, United States
- Occupations: Percussionist, rhythm dancer, educator
- Years active: 1959–present

Keith Terry (born November 22, 1951, in Waxahachie, Texas) is an American percussionist, rhythm dancer, and educator. He is best known for pioneering the art form, Body Music. He is a soloist and the ensemble director of Crosspulse, an Oakland, California-based, non-profit organization dedicated to the creation and performance of rhythm-based intercultural music and dance. Crosspulse was founded by Terry with Deborah Lloyd and Jim Hogan and produces dance and music works ranging in size from solos and duos to ensembles of one hundred performers, touring ambitious and logistically complex performances throughout the world. In addition, Crosspulse produces educational and outreach programs for children and adults and audio and video recordings and books, including "The Rhythm of Math." His teaching method has been praised by music educators, especially within the Orff system. In 2008, Terry was honored with a Guggenheim Fellowship.

Terry is also the founding director of the International Body Music Festival(IBMF), an annual six-day Body Music festival that has been produced in the United States, Brazil, Turkey, Indonesia, Ghana, Italy, Greece and France. As part of the 10th International Body Music Festival in Accra, Ghana, Terry was awarded the 2018 PERCUACTION Lifetime Achievement Award, acknowledging his achievements in the fields of performance, industry and education. Previous honorees include: Jose Luis Quintana 'Changuito', Reinhard Flatischler, Dame Evelyn Glennie, Remo Belli, Zakir Hussain and Keiko Abe.

== Professional development ==
In 1979, Terry became a charter member of the San Francisco Bay Area-based Gamelan Sekar Jaya, founded by Michael Tenzer, Rachel Cooper, and I Wayan Suweca, a community Balinese music and dance group that has become the foremost Balinese group outside of Bali. At the same time, Terry worked with the Pickle Family Circus and Jazz Tap Ensemble (JTE). At JTE, from 1979-1983 he created several original body percussion works with the dancers and musicians including “Tune for KB” and “Hey Rube.” During one rehearsal, Terry had a revelation that he could displace everything he was doing with the drums onto his body. He stood up and started dancing his music. Keith originated the term “body music” to describe his new inventions.

As a soloist Terry has appeared at Lincoln Center, Bumbershoot, the Vienna International Dance Festival, and the Paradiso van Slag World Drum Festival in Amsterdam and been featured on NPR’s All Things Considered and PRI's, "The World". His groups – Corposonic, Slammin All-Body Band, Crosspulse Percussion Ensemble, Professor Terry’s Circus Band Extraordinaire, Body Tjak (with I Wayan Dibia), and Free Dive – have performed in a variety of venues, including Joe’s Pub, WNYC, and Lincoln Center Out-of-Doors (NY); Grand Performances, LACMA Jazz, Freight and Salvage, Berkeley, the Roxy, and the Skirball Center (Los Angeles); SFJazz, Vancouver Island MusicFest, and the Bali Arts Festival. Keith has performed with artists including Charles “Honi” Coles, Turtle Island Quartet, Gamelan Sekar Jaya, Kenny Endo, Freddie Hubbard, Tex Williams, Robin Williams, and Bobby McFerrin.

Terry collaborates with many of the International Body Music Festival artists including Evie Ladin, Bryan Dyer, Fernando Barba (and members of Barbatuques), Dewa Putu Berata (and members of Çudamani), Leela Petronio, Thanos Daskalopoulos, Jep Melendez, and Raul Cabrera. He tours extensively in the Americas, Asia, and Europe, where his Body Music performances, workshops, residencies and choreographic commissions are popular among professional performers and educators.

Keith Terry has a BA in World Music from Antioch University/West, San Francisco. From 1998 to 2005 Terry was on the faculty at UCLA’s Department of World Arts and Cultures. In 2006 he conceived and directed the first International Body Music Performance Project for the Orff Institute in Salzburg, Austria. In 2010 Terry was on the Dance Program faculty at UC Berkeley.

== Discography ==
Recordings with Crosspulse and other ensembles
| Year | Album | Artist or ensemble |
|---|---|---|
| 1994 | Keith Terry & Crosspulse | Keith Terry & Crosspulse |
| 1998 | Serpentine | Keith Terry & Crosspulse |
| 2001 | Body Tjak/The Celebration (soundtrack) | Keith Terry & Crosspulse |
| 2004 | Live! | Professor Terry's Circus Band Extraordináire |
| 2005 | SLAMMIN all-body band | Slammin All-Body Band |
| 2013 | I Like Everything About You (Yes I Do!) | Crosspulse Percussion Ensemble |
| 2021 | Free Dive | Free Dive |

=== With Evie Ladin and the Evie Ladin Band ===
Recordings with Evie Ladin and the Evie Ladin Band
| Year | Album | Artist | Contributions |
|---|---|---|---|
| 2010 | Float Downstream | Evie Ladin | Drums, percussion, bass harmonica; production with Mike Marshall. |
| 2012 | Evie Ladin Band | Evie Ladin Band | Bass, percussion, bass harmonica, body music, vocals; co-producer. |
| 2016 | Jump the Fire | Evie Ladin Band | Vocals, bass, percussion, body music. |
| 2019 | Caught on a Wire | Evie Ladin Band | Vocals, bass, drums, percussion. |
| 2020 | Playing Our Hand | Evie Ladin Band | Vocals, bass. |
| 2024 | Evie Ladin Band Live | Evie Ladin Band | Vocals, bass, body music. |

=== Selected collaborations and session work ===
Selected recordings featuring Keith Terry
| Year | Artist | Album | Contribution |
|---|---|---|---|
| 1979 | Fred Raulston | Open Stream | Drums, percussion; production assistance. |
| 1981 | Fred Raulston | Uncharted Waters | Drums. |
| 1993 | Alex de Grassi | The World's Getting Loud | Sound effects. |
| 1995 | Danny Heines | Vanishing Borders | Drums. |
| 1997 | Linda Tillery | Front Porch Music | Shaker, surdo, gankogui and hands. |
| 1999 | Dale Zola | Breeze at Dawn: The Poems of Rumi in Song | Percussion. |
| 2008 | The Stairwell Sisters | Get Off Your Money | Percussion, cajón. |

=== Selected compilation appearances ===
Selected compilation recordings featuring Keith Terry
| Year | Album | Artist | Contribution |
|---|---|---|---|
| 2006 | Pure Alex de Grassi | Alex de Grassi | Percussion. |
| 2020 | Kauai Old Time 2019 | Various artists | Performs on "Lonesome John" with Evie Ladin, and "Hell Fire" with Josh Chung, Jordan Wax and Nakana Wong. |

== Videos ==
Instructional and performance videos
| Year | Title | Type |
|---|---|---|
| 2000 | Body Tjak/The Celebration | Live performance DVD. |
| 2002 | Body Music, Part One with Keith Terry | Instructional DVD. |
| 2007 | Body Music, Part Two with Keith Terry | Instructional DVD. |
| 2013 | Slammin All-Body Band | Performance DVD. |
| 2014 | Body Music, Part Three with Keith Terry | Instructional DVD. |
| 2015 | Rhythm of Math: Teaching Mathematics with Body Music | 52-minute instructional video accompanying the book by Keith Terry and Linda Akiyama. |
| 2018 | Highlights from IBMF 6 (2013) | Live performance DVD featuring the sixth International Body Music Festival. |
| 2019 | Body Music, Part Four with Keith Terry | Instructional DVD. |

Terry also presents Body Music Mini-Lessons, a series of downloadable instructional videos with accompanying notation. The series includes excerpts from his four Body Music instructional videos, as well as activities directed toward children and teachers.

== Television appearances ==
Selected television appearances
| Series | Program | Appearance |
|---|---|---|
| Alive from Off Center | "Dancing Hands" | Performer and choreographer in Skip Blumberg's 1988 production featuring choreography for fingers, hands and arms. |
| Lonesome Pine Specials | "Masters of Percussion" | Featured performer. |
| Lonesome Pine Specials | Turtle Island String Quartet / Keith Terry | Body percussionist performing with the Turtle Island String Quartet. |

== Books ==
- 2015, Rhythm of Math: Teaching Mathematics with Body Music Book/DVD with Linda Akiyama
