= John C. Campbell =

American educator

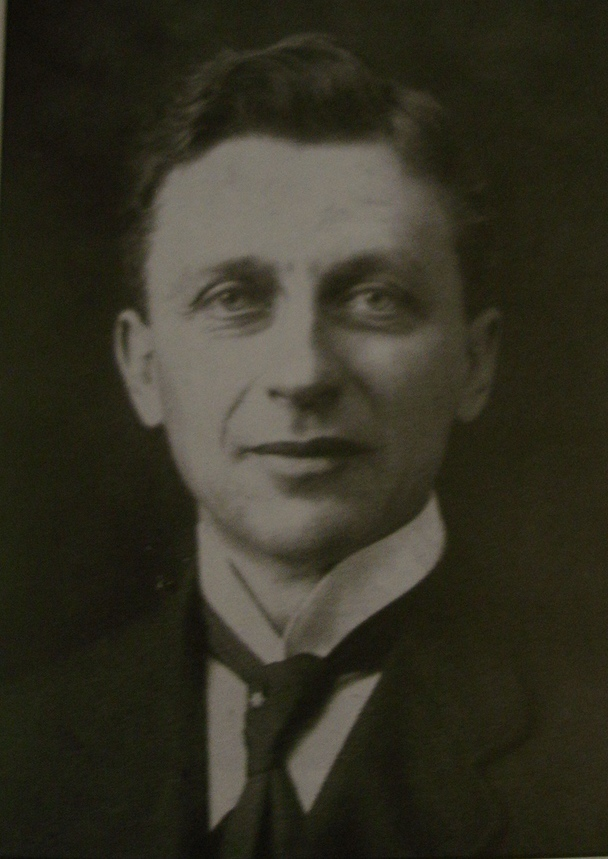
- Born: 14 September 1867; Indiana
- Died: 1919; Brasstown, North Carolina
- Occupation: Educator
- Years active: 1904–1919
- Known for: 2nd President of Piedmont College and inspiration of John C. Campbell Folk School
- Title: President of Piedmont College
- Term: 1904-1907
- Predecessor: Charles C. Spence
- Successor: Henry Clinton Newell
- Spouse: Olive Dame Campbell

John Charles Campbell (14 September 1867 – 1919) was an American educator and reformer noted for his survey of social conditions in the southern Appalachian region of the United States during the early 1900s. He served a term as president of Piedmont College from 1904 to 1907.

== Background ==
Campbell was born to Gavin and Anna Barbara Campbell, and grew up in Stevens Point, Wisconsin. He graduated from Williams College in 1892 and received a bachelor of divinity degree from Andover Theological Seminary in 1895.

Campbell studied education and theology in New England before traveling to the Southern United States. There he outfitted a wagon to serve as a mobile house as he interviewed working people, particularly farmers.

Campbell married first wife Grace H. Buckingham, who died in 1905. In 1907 he married folklorist Olive Dame of West Medford, Massachusetts.

After Campbell's death, his wife Olive established the John C. Campbell Folk School in 1925 in Brasstown, North Carolina.
