= Olive Dame Campbell =

American folklorist

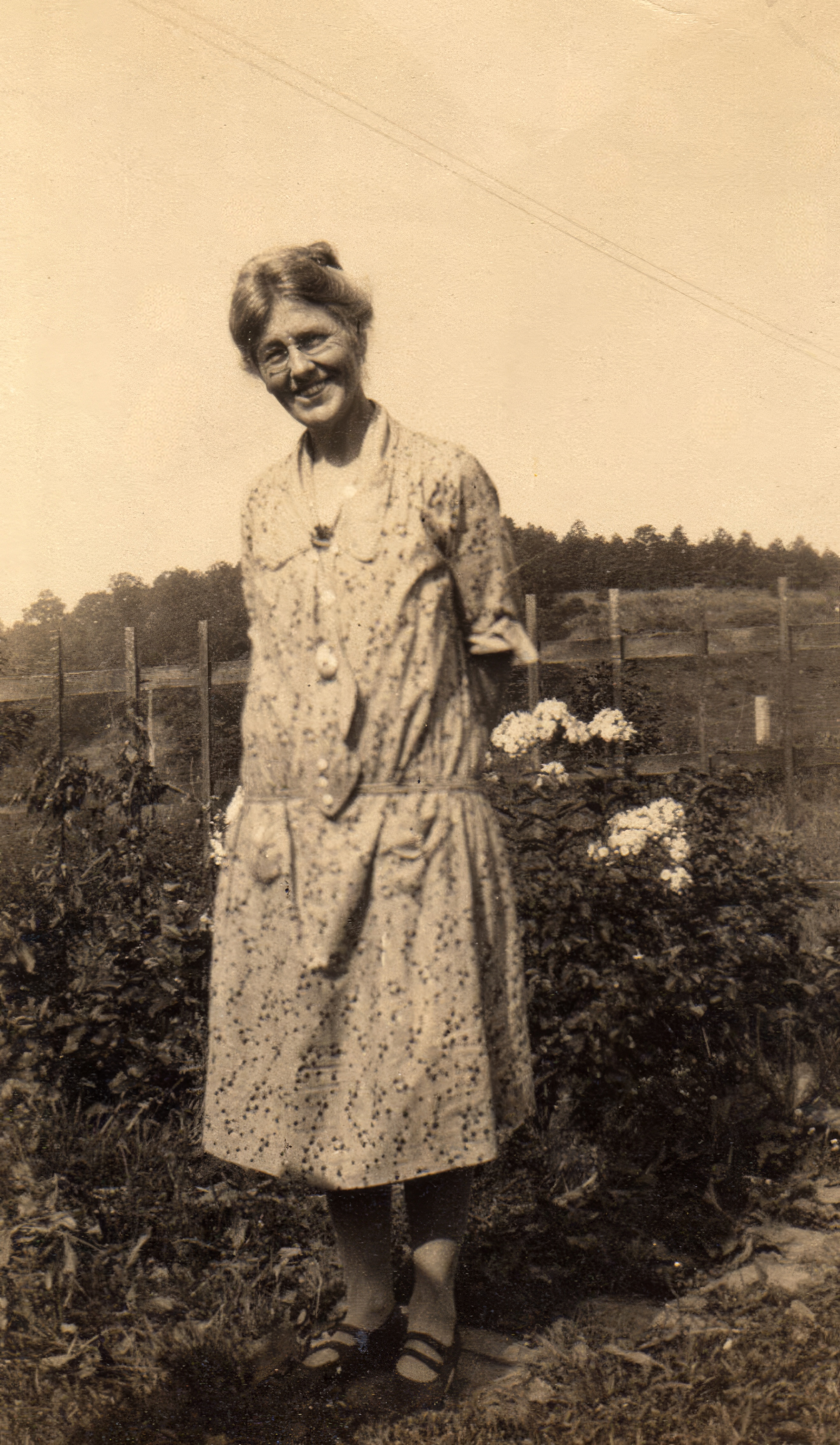
Olive Dame Campbell, founder of the John C. Campbell Folk School in Brasstown, North Carolina

Olive Dame Campbell (1882–1954) was an American folklorist.

== Biography ==
Olive Dame Campbell was born Olive Arnold Dame in 1882 in Medford, Massachusetts. From a young age, education played an important role in her life, as her father was the head of a private high school. She graduated from Tufts College in 1900 during a time when most women did not pursue higher education. In 1903 she met her future husband John Charles Campbell (1867–1919), 15 years her senior, who was a missionary school teacher, marrying him in 1907, after which he went on to become a noted educator and social reformer.

Olive was Campbell's second wife, and together they traveled to Appalachia, where John had received a grant in 1909 to study the area's social and cultural conditions in hopes of improving their school systems. While there, Olive noted that ballads sung by the residents had strong ties to both English and Scots-Irish folk songs. The ballads that she collected would eventually be published as English Folk Songs from the Southern Appalachians by Cecil Sharp and Olive D. Campbell in 1917. This collection would later influence several productions, particularly the 2000 drama film Songcatcher.

After only 12 years of marriage, Olive's husband John died in 1919. After his death, Olive worked on collecting and organizing his notes from their work together so that a report of his survey could be published. Attempting to follow the writing style of her husband as much as possible, Olive Campbell successfully published “The Southern Highlander and His Homeland” in 1921 under John's name.

In 1922 Olive was back to work and ready to embark on a trip to Copenhagen via a fellowship provided by the American-Scandinavian Foundation in order to study the Danish Folk School style of education, in hopes of finding a way to revitalize the local Appalachian school system. Accompanied by her sister Daisy Dame and colleague Marguerite Butler, the women spent 18 months traveling between Denmark, Norway, Sweden, and Finland, visiting local schools along the way.

In 1925 upon her return, Olive founded the John C. Campbell Folk School in Brasstown, North Carolina. This folkehøjskoler, or folk school dedicated to her late husband was based on noncompetitive Scandinavian schools for common people, where no grades were given and no one ever failed. Instead, students and teachers formed a community that worked together in the process of improving their quality of life through education. Keith House, the heart of the school, was built on land donated by the parents of Fred O. Scroggs, with materials and labor pledged and donated by local people who were delighted to have a school dedicated to their well-being. At first the curriculum centered around improving agricultural practices to relieve poverty. For decades regional folk dancing was also encouraged. With Olive's encouragement, idle men sitting outside of Fred O. Scroggs' General Store found a way to bring much-needed income to their families by carving realistic animals. The Brasstown Carvers began with Olive's designs then branched into original work.

Olive continued to work in collecting ballads and handicrafts until her death in 1954. She was known for her meticulous preservation of ballads, sense of humor and attentive listening. While she had no surviving children, the legacy of her work in collecting crafts and ballads, along with the founding of the John C. Campbell Folk School, lives on today.

== Legacy ==
Today the Folk School attracts students from all over the country (and some from abroad) while still offering people from the surrounding Appalachian area ways to improve their quality of life. Traditions such as Morning Song give students the opportunity to begin their day with stories and songs from the region. Staff, work-studies, and visiting students dine together family-style on freshly prepared foods in the dining hall bearing Olive Dame Campbell's name. Some of the vegetables, fruit, and honey come from the Folk School's own organic garden. On Tuesday nights live music and a caller are provided so that students and neighbors can get a taste of the Folk School's decades old tradition of contra dancing. On Saturday nights free concerts attract community members to the school. At the end of a week of course work students come together in Keith House to share examples of the work they have created.

After renovations and enhancements, based on student, faculty, and staff feedback, the Folk School's blacksmithing program has become the best in the world. The original blacksmith's shop was built with help from the American Friends Service Committee. A wide variety of classes last from a single weekend to an entire week. In addition to blacksmithing, offerings include ceramics, spinning, weaving, dying, wood carving, woodworking on a lathe, furniture construction, book arts, painting, mixed media, garden art, gardening, landscaping, nature studies, cooking, masonry, storytelling, writing, singing, and the construction of musical instruments. The classes allow people to come together and enjoy learning in a relaxed, nonjudgmental atmosphere. The Folk School's motto "Sing Behind the Plow" is a reminder of Olive Dame Campbell's original vision of finding a joyous way for people to improve their quality of life through the experience of community.

In 2008 Revels Repertory Company created a tribute to Olive and the music she collected titled Voices from the Mountain, which was performed throughout eastern Massachusetts during the 2008/2009 and 2009/2010 seasons.

IN 2012, Revels Repertory Company was disbanded, and In Good Company, Inc. was formed by the former members of Revels Repertory Company. In Spring 2016, In Good Company, Inc. produced two performances of Voices from the Mountain in Lexington, Massachusetts.

== Other publications ==
The following is a list of several other publications by Olive Dame Campbell (some publishers are unknown):

- Campbell, Olive Dame. 1915. Songs and Ballads of the Southern Mountains.
- Campbell, Olive Dame. 1928. The Danish folk school: its influence in the life of Denmark and the North. University of Michigan. 359 pages.
- Campbell, Olive Dame, et al. 1937. George Lyman Kittredge additional papers on American songs and ballads.
