= Evie Ladin =

American musical artist

- Born: New York City, U.S.
- Genres: Americana
- Occupations: Singer-songwriter, choreographer, dancer, clawhammer banjo, educator
- Instruments: Singing, banjo, guitar
- Website: www.evieladin.com

Evie Ladin is an American musician, singer-songwriter, percussive dancer, choreographer, and square dance caller living in Oakland, California. She performs with The Evie Ladin Band, a trio with Keith Terry and Erik Pearson, and also collaborates with Keith Terry as a duo. Other projects include two all-female groups: The Stairwell Sisters, an old-time group utilizing clawhammer banjo, guitar, bass, percussive dance, and MoToR/dance.

Ladin's 2012 CD, Evie Ladin Band, was voted Americana Album of the Year by the Independent Music Awards (IMAs) Vox Pop Vote. A banjo player since childhood, Ladin features regularly on the annual Banjo Babes compilation album and calendar. Ladin is also the Executive Director of the International Body Music Festival (IBMF), a project of the Oakland-based arts non-profit Crosspulse.

== Background ==
Ladin, the daughter of an old-time and traditional music enthusiast and International Folk Dance Instructor, and her sister, Abby, grew up immersed in traditional American music and dance. Summers were spent at either folk festivals or music camps. At home during the later years of the American folk music revival, traveling musicians often stopped over for the night. She attended Brown University, where she created a major in African Studies in Dance. She later traveled to Nigeria and studied dance on a Fulbright Fellowship. In the early 1990s, Ladin studied jazz and tap in New York, followed by eight years working with Ohio-based dance company Rhythm in Shoes.

Ladin's work often explores the intersection of Appalachian music and dance with the traditions of the African Diaspora. In 2018, she returned to Africa for the 10th International Body Music Festival (IBMF) in Dzodze, Ghana. She taught classes in rhythm and body music at the John C. Campbell Folk School.

== Awards and honors ==
- 1991 Fulbright Fellowship
- 1991 Watson Fellowship
- 2012 Americana Album of the Year - Independent Music Awards Vox Pop Fan Vote
- 2013 Parents’ Choice Gold Award

== Discography ==
- Evie Ladin Band: Caught on a Wire (2019)
- Evie Ladin Band: Riding the Rooster (2018)
- Evie Ladin Band: Jump the Fire (2016)
- Buckdancing for Beginners 2: Freestyle (2013)
- Evie Ladin Band, Evie Ladin Band (2012)
- Evie Ladin Band: Float Downstream (2010)
- Stairwell Sisters, Get Off Your Money (2008), Lloyd Maines
- Stairwell Sisters, Feet All Over the Floor (2005), Yodel-Ay-Hee
- Stairwell Sisters, The Stairwell Sisters (2003), Yodel-Ay-Hee
- Crosspulse Percussion Ensemble: I Like Everything About You, Yes I Do!
- Crosspulse, Professor Terry's Circus Band Extraordináire (with Linda Tillery, David Balakrishnan, George Brooks, Paul Hanson, and others)
- Crosspulse, Body Tjak: The Soundtrack (with Indonesian artists)
- Buckdancing for Beginners: The Basics of Southern Appalachian Flatfoot Clogging (2002)
- Banjo Babes
