= Seth Tepfer =

American contra dance caller and writer

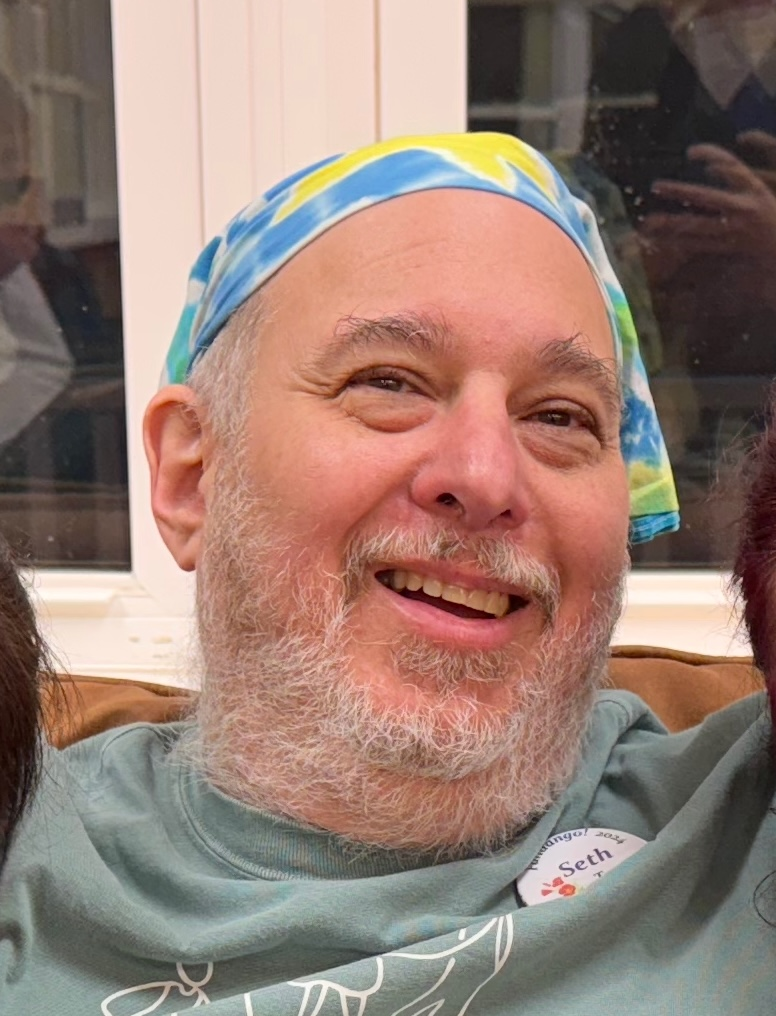
Seth Tepfer at the John C. Campbell Folk School in 2024.

Seth Tepfer is an American contra dance caller and writer from Decatur, Georgia. He has written approximately 200 dances, which he has released under a Creative Commons license. The Elizabethton Star called Tepfer one of the "nation's top callers."

== Education ==
Tepfer graduated from Emory University in 1990 with a degree in Mathematics and Computer Science. He began managing the school’s computer labs after graduation and in 1995 he started working as director of administrative technologies at Emory's Oxford College. In 2016, Tepfer earned an MBA in Management of Technology from Georgia Tech.

== Calling career ==
In 1987, Tepfer began Scottish country dancing. He learned to call at the John C. Campbell Folk School and started calling contra dances in 1997. Tepfer was the caller for a barn dance for former president Jimmy Carter and his wife Rosalynn in 2004. In 2012, the Elizabethton Star called him one of the "nation's top callers." In the 2014 film The Hunger Games: Mockingjay – Part 1, Tepfer choreographed folk dancing for the wedding scene and trained the actors for the sequence. Internationally, Tepfer has called dances in Canada, France, Germany, Denmark, Costa Rica, Greece, and England. Tepfer also teaches dance calling and calls traditional square and English country dances. He has organized dance weekends around the world, including Butterfly Whirl, Atlanta Dance Weekend, Bonaire Dance and Dive, and Florida Rhapsody. He is a regular caller at U.S. dance weeks and weekends such as Chattaboogie, Bug Stomp, Spring Dance Romance, Lady of the Lake, Cumberland Dance Week, and Winter Dance Week. In 2026, he collaborated with the Country Dance and Song Society to host the monthly Contra Callers' Corner series.

== Personal life ==
Tepfer has been married to Pam Eidson since 2002. They met at a contra dance and he proposed at a contra dance. They have two sons.
