= John C. Campbell Folk School =

Historic folk arts school in North Carolina, United States

- John C. Campbell Folk School Historic District
- U.S. National Register of Historic Places
- U.S. Historic district
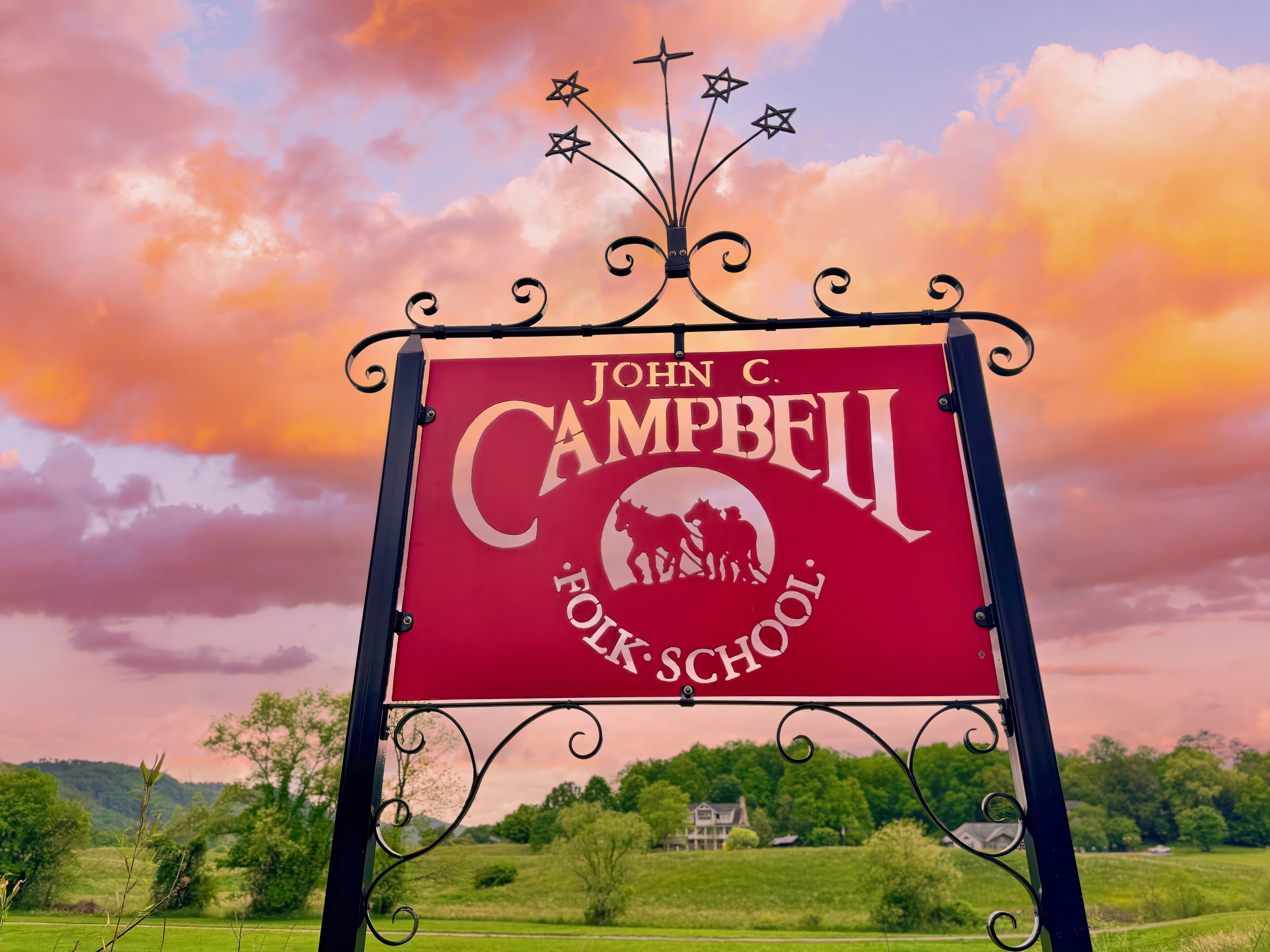

- Location within North Carolina Location within the United States
- Location: Off U.S. Route 64, Brasstown, North Carolina
- Coordinates: 35°02′14″N 83°57′52″W
- Area: 300 acres (120 ha)
- Built: 1925
- Architect: Multiple
- NRHP reference No.: 83001839
- Added to NRHP: August 22, 1983

The John C. Campbell Folk School, also referred to as "The Folk School", is located in Brasstown, North Carolina. It is the oldest and largest folk school in the United States. It is a non-profit adult educational organization based on non-competitive learning. The Folk School offers classes year-round in over fifty subject areas including art, craft, music, dance, and nature studies. Established in 1925, the Folk School's motto is "I sing behind the plow".

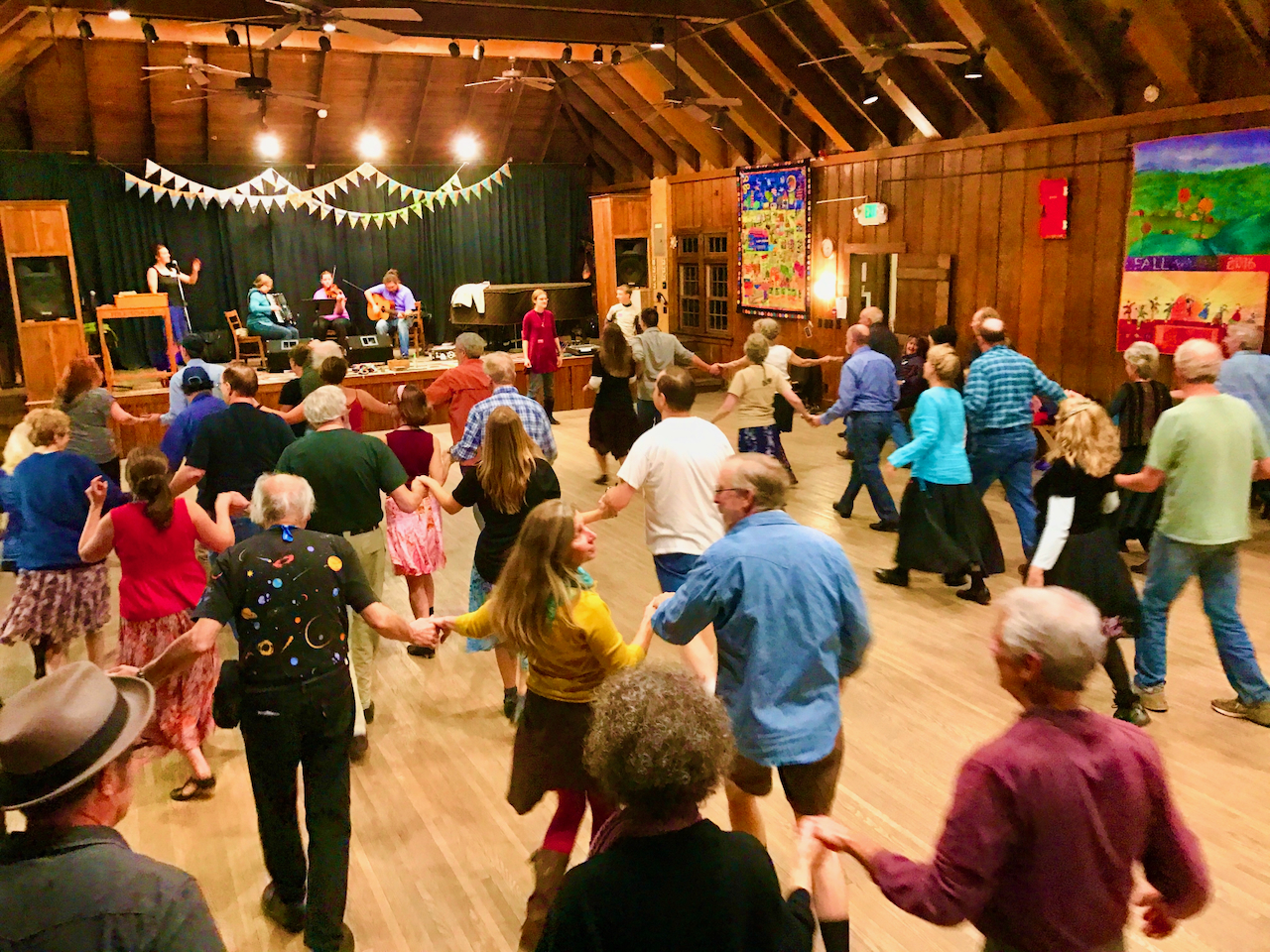
A contra dance at the Folk School

It was listed on the National Register of Historic Places as a national historic district in 1983. The district encompasses 19 contributing buildings. Notable buildings include the Farm House (pre-1925), Keith House (1926–1928), Log House Museum (19th century, 1926), Mill House (1928), (Former) Milking Barn (now Clay Spencer Blacksmith Shop, c. 1930), Hay Barn (1931), Tower House (1933), Rock House (c. 1932), and Hill House (c. 1932).

The Folk School has more than 850 week-long and weekend classes year-round in traditional and contemporary arts, including blacksmithing, music, dance, cooking, gardening, nature studies, photography, storytelling, and writing. The 300-acre (120 ha) campus includes a history museum, craft shop, nature trails, lodging, campground, and cafeteria. The school also holds more than 300 performance events annually, including a regular concert series and community dances. The Folk School engages the community through a variety of dance teams including Rapper Magic Sword, StiX in the Mud Border Morris, Dame's Rocket Northwest Clog, Rural Felicity Garland, and the JCCFS Cloggers. The Folk School is considered to have one of the most prestigious folk dance programs in the United States.

The Folk School hosts more than 6,000 adult students and 100,000 visitors per year. As of 2017, the school's endowment was $4.4 million. As of 2024, its annual operating budget is $8 million.

== History of the Folk School ==
=== Formation ===
After spending eighteen months traveling between Denmark, Norway, Sweden, and Finland, visiting local schools along the way, Olive Dame Campbell and her colleague Marguerite Butler, began forming the John C. Campbell Folk School in 1925 in Brasstown, North Carolina, along the Cherokee County and Clay line. This folk high school, or folkehøjskole, was dedicated to her late husband John C. Campbell, and was based on the Danish Folk School style of non competitive education, where no grades were given. Instead, students and teachers formed a community that worked together to help each other advance in various crafts such as blacksmithing. It was originally founded with an emphasis on agriculture and "the doing of life's work."

John C. Campbell, (1867–1919) was an American educator and reformer noted for his survey of social conditions in the southern Appalachia. He was born in Indiana and raised in Wisconsin; he studied education and theology in New England.

At the turn of the century, the Southern Appalachian region of the United States was viewed as being in need of educational and social missions. Recently married to Olive Dame of Massachusetts, John undertook a fact-finding survey of social conditions in the mountains in 1908–1909. The Campbells outfitted a wagon as a traveling home and studied mountain life from Georgia to West Virginia.

While John interviewed farmers about their agricultural practices, Olive collected Appalachian ballads and studied the handicrafts of the mountain people. Both were hopeful that the quality of life could be improved by education, and in turn, wanted to preserve and share with the rest of the world the crafts, techniques and tools that the people of the area used in everyday life.

The Folkehøjskole had long been a force in the rural life of Denmark. These schools for life helped transform the Danish countryside into a vibrant, creative force. The Campbells talked of establishing such a school in the rural southern United States as an alternative to the higher-education facilities that drew young people away from the family farm.

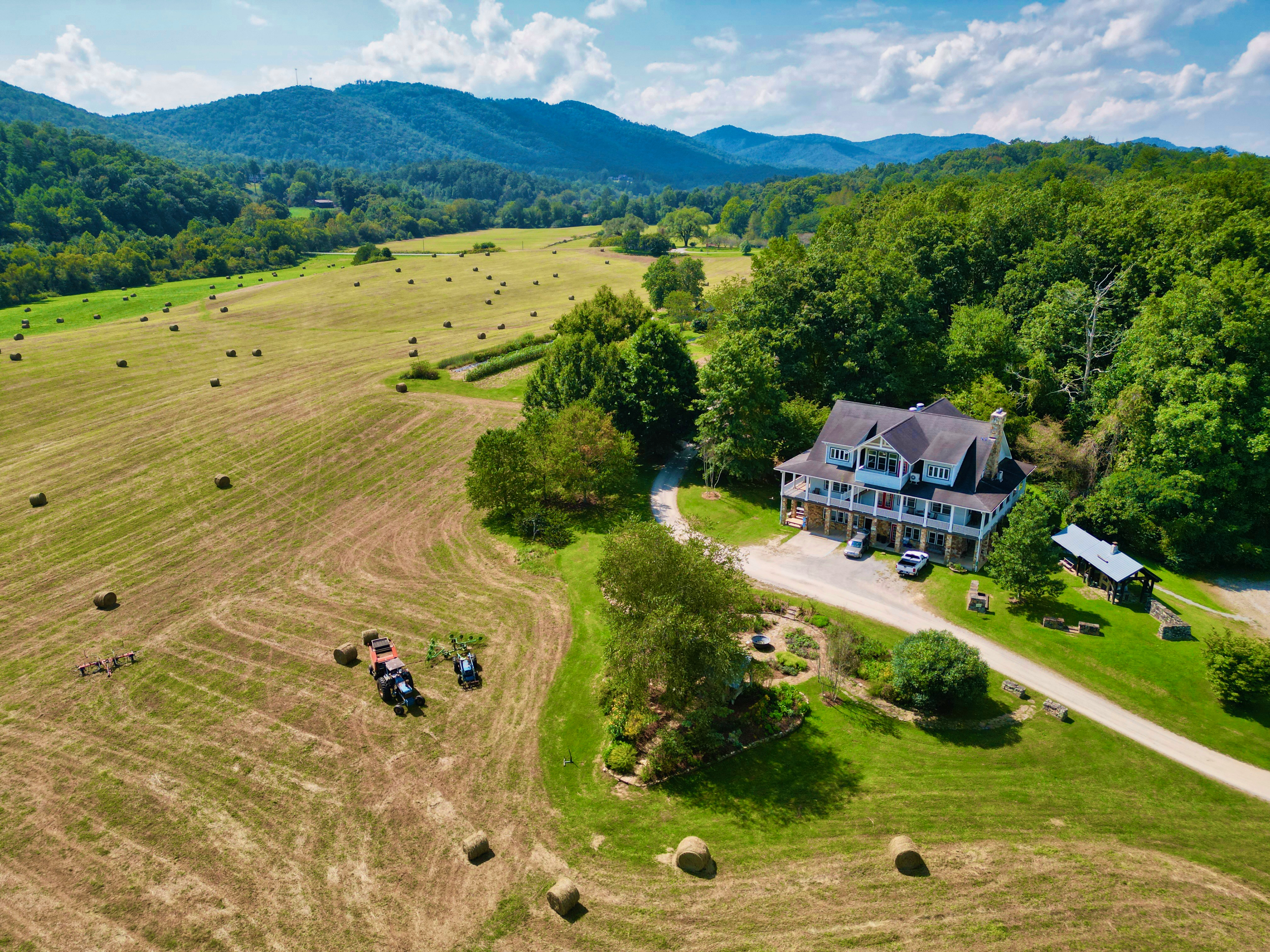
Davidson Hall at the Folk School

Several locations were under consideration for the experimental school. On an exploratory trip, Miss Butler discussed the idea with Fred O. Scroggs, Brasstown's local storekeeper, saying that she would be back in a few weeks to determine if area residents had any interest in the idea. When she returned, it was to a meeting of over 200 people at the local church. The people of far west North Carolina enthusiastically pledged labor, land, building materials and other support. The first structure built on campus after the school's founding in 1925 was the Community Room in 1927. After the Cherokee County Courthouse burned down in 1926, bricks salvaged from the old courthouse were used to build the Community Room chimney. In 1928, the four-story Keith House was added on to the Community Room.

=== Growth, events, and campus development ===
The school was initially geared to students aged 17 to 35 who would study for a year or two at a time. The campus included men's and women's dormitories, a dairy barn, poultry houses, and a saving and loan association. Early classes included gymnastics, public health, history, geography, literature, and folk dancing. The Brasstown Carvers formed at the Folk School in 1929. A wood-carved mule from the Folk School stood on President Franklin D. Roosevelt’s Oval Office desk in the 1930s. The Folk School also operated a creamery in the 1930s. It was equipped to churn 6,000 pounds of butter a week, one-third of which was sold to businesses in Atlanta. The creamery produced ice cream and whole milk as well.

As late as 1934 the Folk School and Brasstown operated in its own time zone. At that time Cherokee County operated on Central time and Clay County ran on Eastern time. Due to frequent gatherings at the Folk School, Brasstown clocks were set half-way in-between to avoid confusion. When it was 1 p.m. in Murphy and 2 p.m. in Hayesville, it was 1:30 p.m. in Brasstown.

Since 1937, the Folk School has also hosted an annual summer arts program for youth called Little Middle. In the early 1940s, the Folk School became one of the first places in the area to receive electricity following the construction of Hiwassee Dam. A dramatic reading of A Christmas Carol has been performed on campus each December since 1949. The annual Fireside Sale launched in 1967. In 1973, the Brasstown Concert Association was founded, hosting its performances at the Folk School's Keith House. That same year the Folk School ended its farming operation and converted farm buildings into craft studios.

The Fall Festival is the Folk School's largest annual event, attracting thousands of people to the campus for crafts, food, and folk demonstrations. The festival has been held every year since 1974, except for 2020 and 2021 during the COVID-19 pandemic. The Folk School has hosted its annual Winter Dance Week between Christmas and New Year's Day since 1979. When the Francis Whitaker Blacksmith Shop opened in 1980, it was the largest teaching blacksmith shop in the United States. During the 1980s, the Folk School had its own theatre guild performing plays on campus. The Brasstown Follies, a community variety show, has been produced on campus every December since at least the early 1990s, hosted by Carl Dreher.

During the tenure of the Folk School's longest-serving director, Jan Davidson, the school changed to a year-round schedule, annual enrollment soared from 2,500 to 6,000 students, and the number of classes offered each year surged from 150 to more than 850. Seven new studios for blacksmithing, cooking, book and paper arts, painting, woodturning, spinning, and music, were constructed during his tenure, along with new student housing. Davidson established the history center and led efforts to restore four historic campus buildings. He also established the institution's endowment. Jan's wife, Nanette, founded the Folk School's cooking program.

In 2003, the Folk School started its Junior Appalachian Musician program, teaching local students how to play folk music throughout the year. Little Brasstown Creek Park opened on the Folk School campus in 2006 next to Brasstown Creek. The park includes multiple nature trails, the Rivercane Walk, and Cherokee history and artwork exhibits. The Folk School launched its annual Friends & Family Day in 2022 for the community to tour studios and see demonstrations. In early 2022 the Folk School opened Olive's Porch, a studio space and retail shop, in downtown Murphy. The Folk School kicked off its 100th anniversary year in 2025 with the restoration and reopening of its log cabin museum and the launch of new campus walking tour experience.

== Class types offered ==
Craft classes include: Basketry; Carpentry; Glass beadmaking; Blacksmithing; Bookbinding; Broom Making; Dollmaking; Dyeing; Felt Making; Furniture Making; Lace; Leather; Metalwork; Needlework; Quilting; Rugs; Sewing; Soap Making; Spinning; Weaving; Woodturning; and Woodworking

Art classes include: Calligraphy; Clay; Drawing; Enameling; Glass; Jewelry; Kaleidoscopes; Knitting; Marbling; Mosaics; Painting; Paper Arts; Photography; Printmaking; Sculpture; and Woodcarving.

Other types of classes include: Baking; Cooking; Dance; Folklore; Gardening; Music; Nature Studies; Storytelling; and Writing.

== Accolades ==
The Folk School was named one of “100 Best Vacations to Enrich Your Life” by National Geographic magazine in 2007 and named “Best of the Road” by Rand McNally Atlas in 2005. In 2024, the Folk School earned the Visit Smokies People’s Choice Award for Cultural & Educational Excellence. In 2025, the Folk School was named "Business of the Year" by the Cherokee County Chamber of Commerce.

== Campus buildings ==
Note: Dates of construction given when known

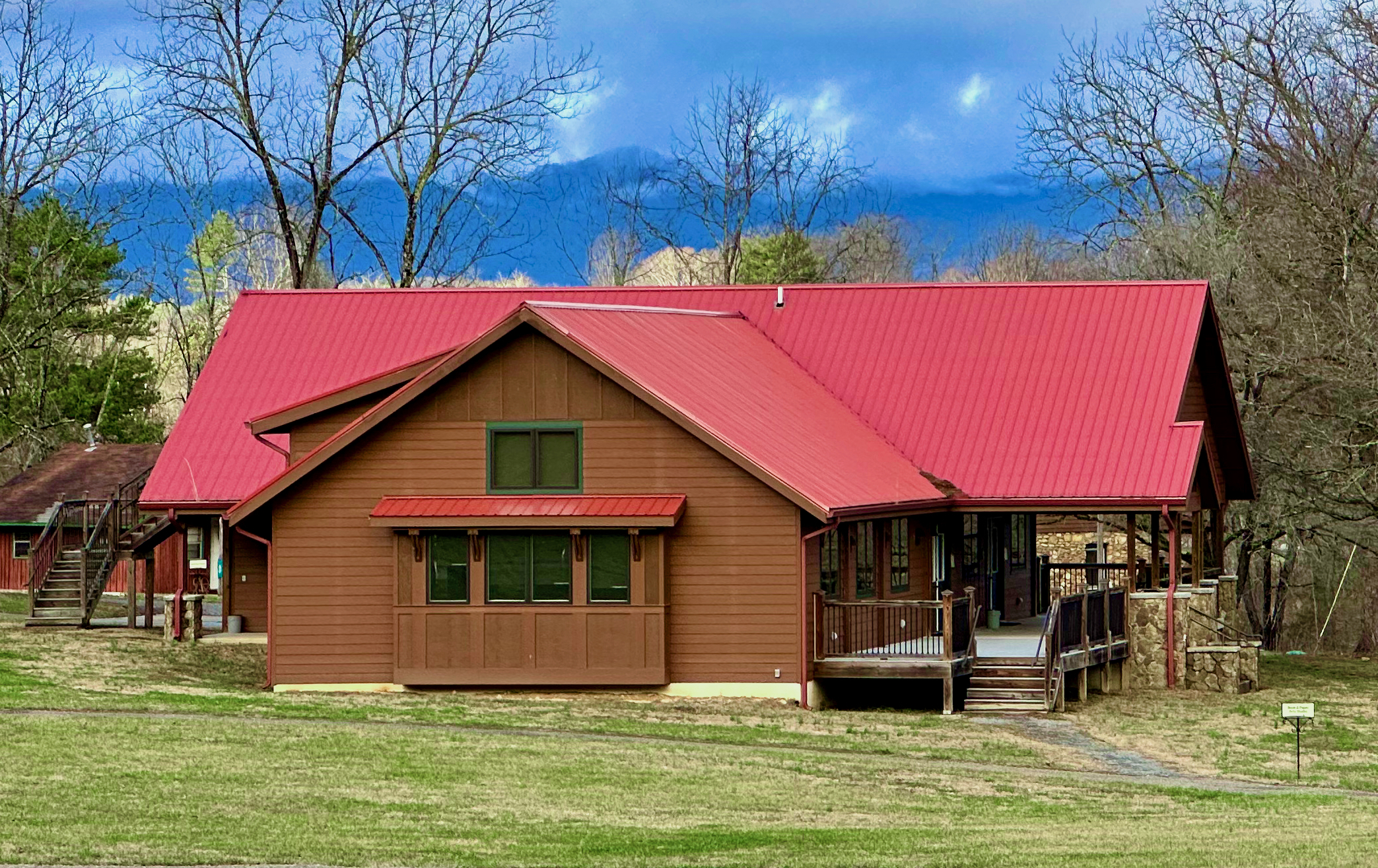
Book & Paper Arts Studio (2019)

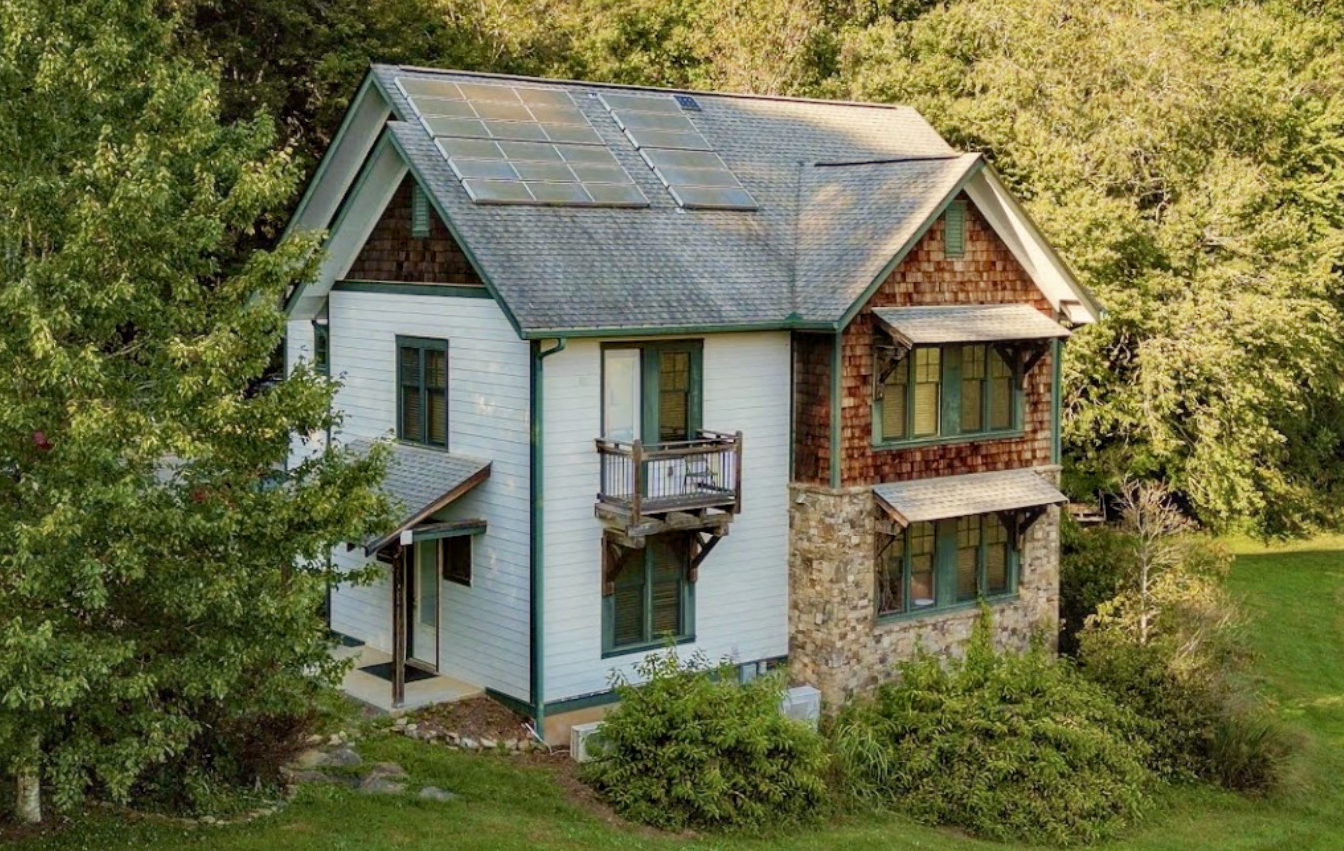
Field House (2008)

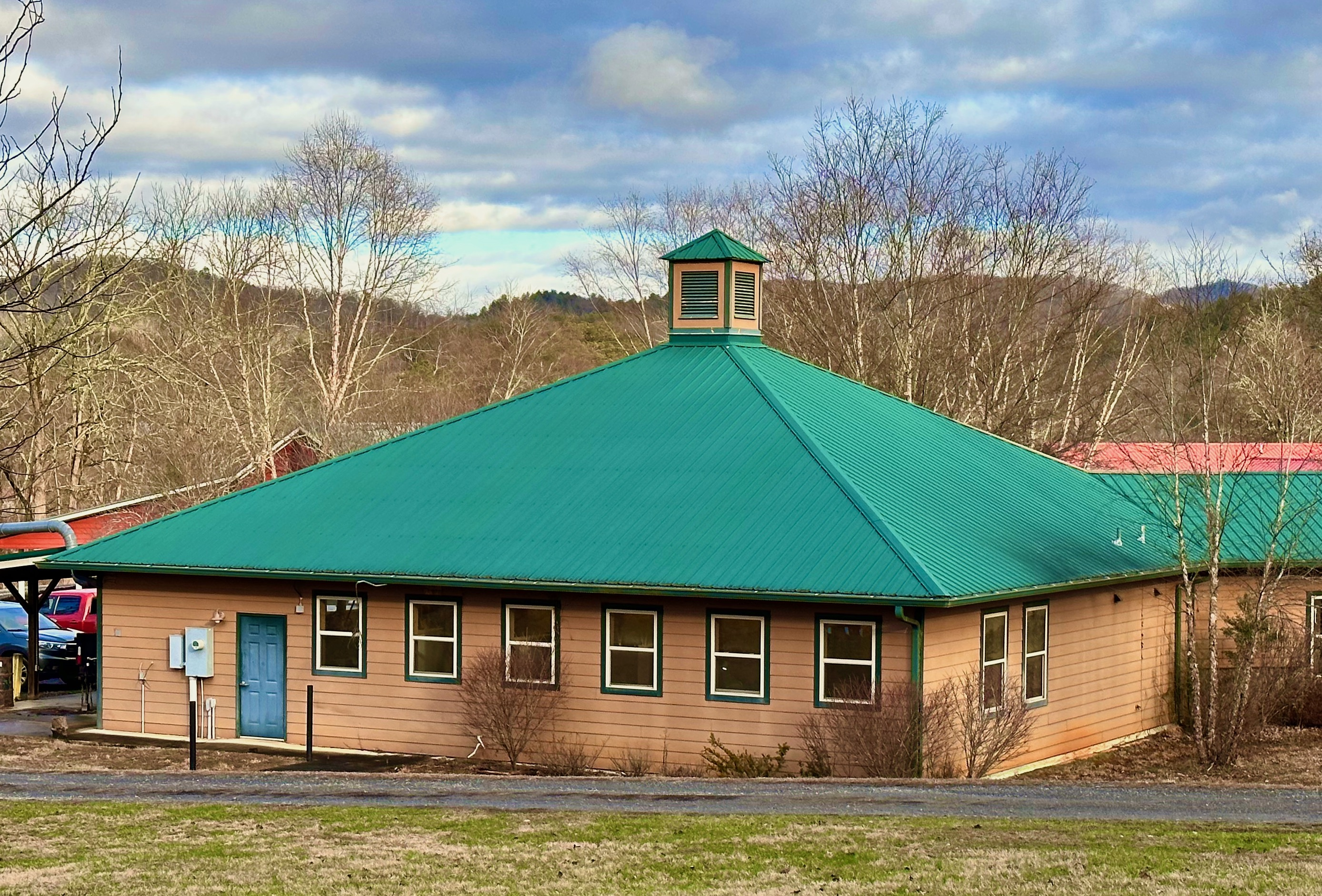
Willard Baxter Woodturning Studio (2006)

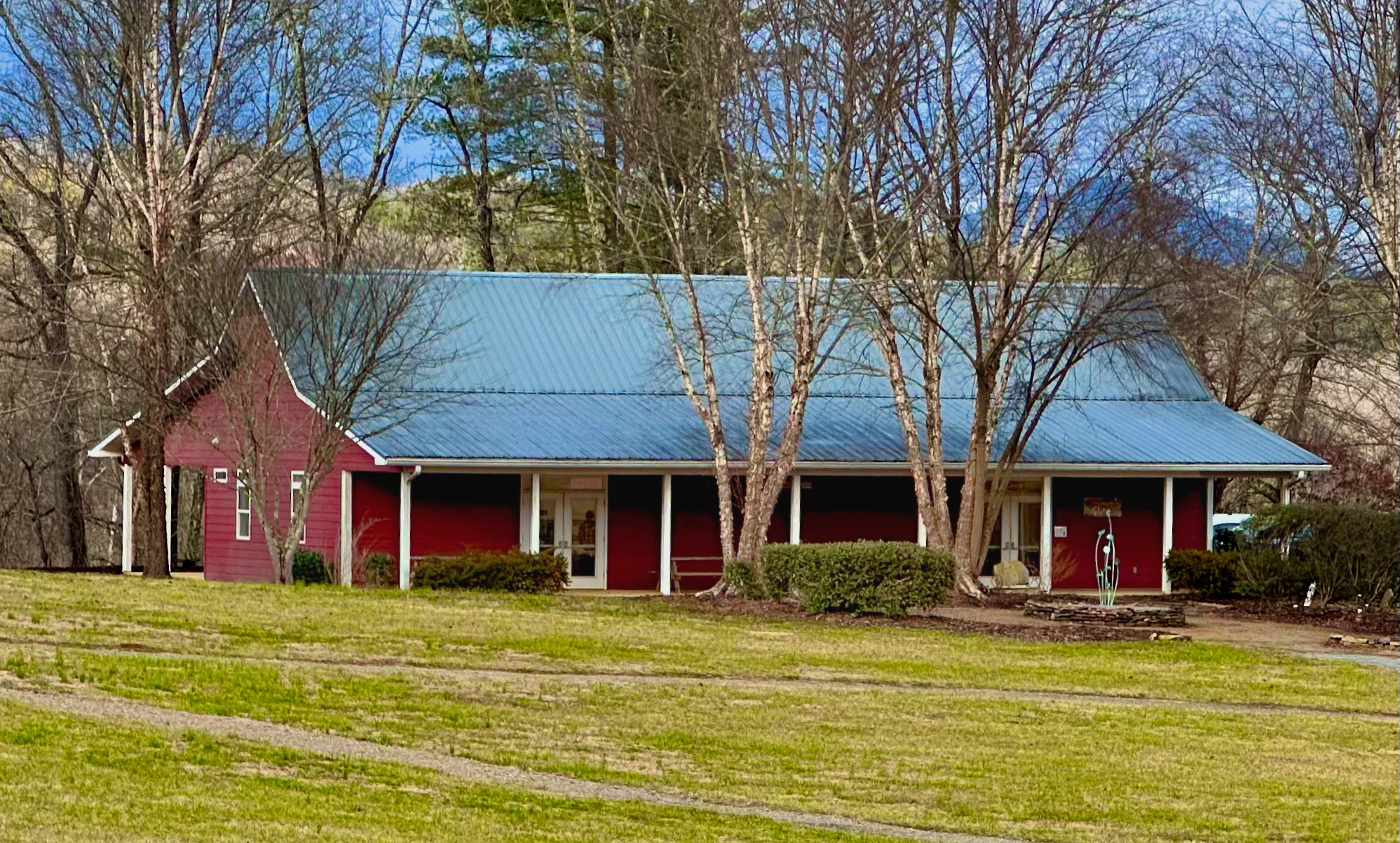
Painting Studio (2005)

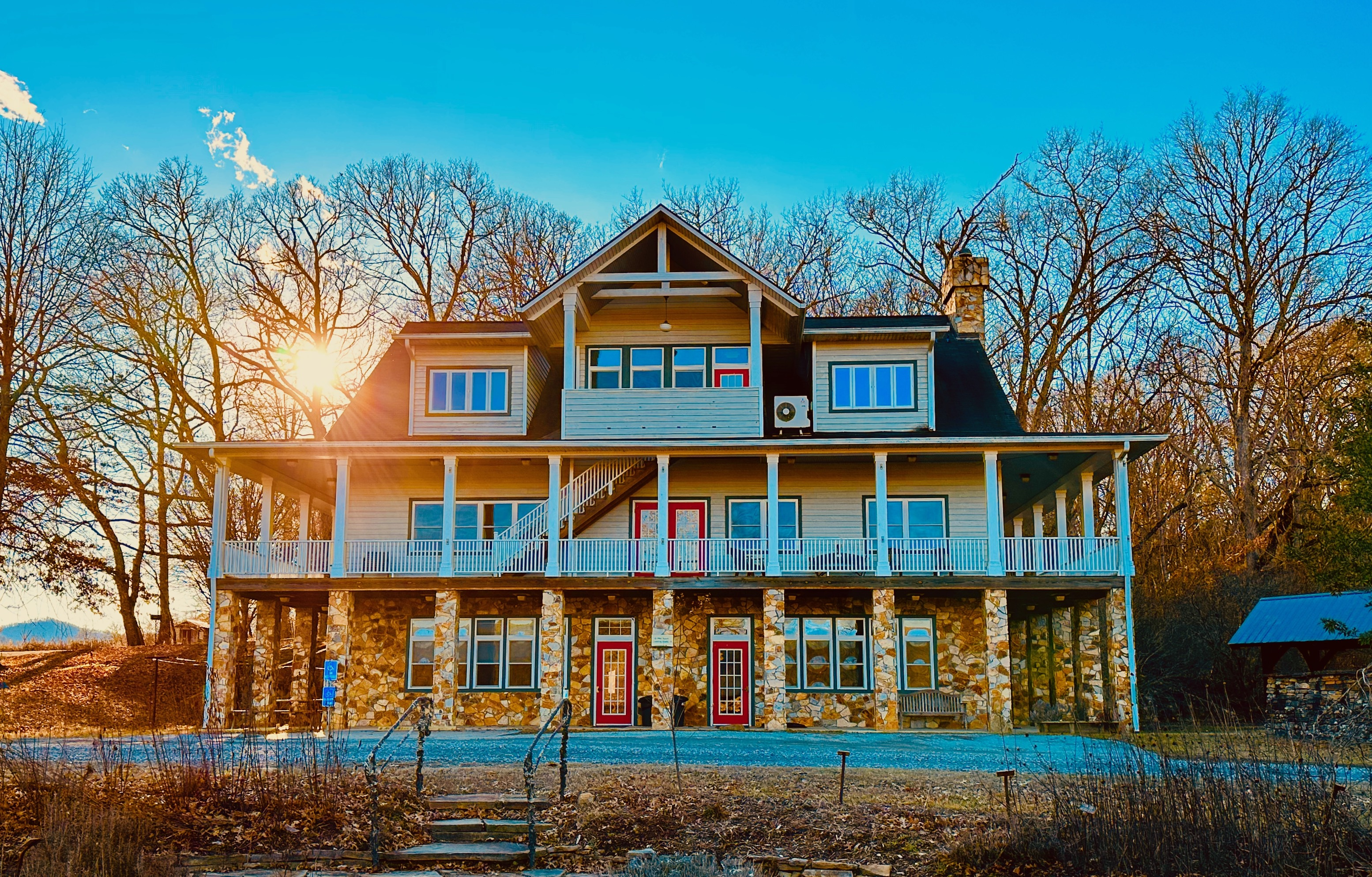
Davidson Hall (1999)

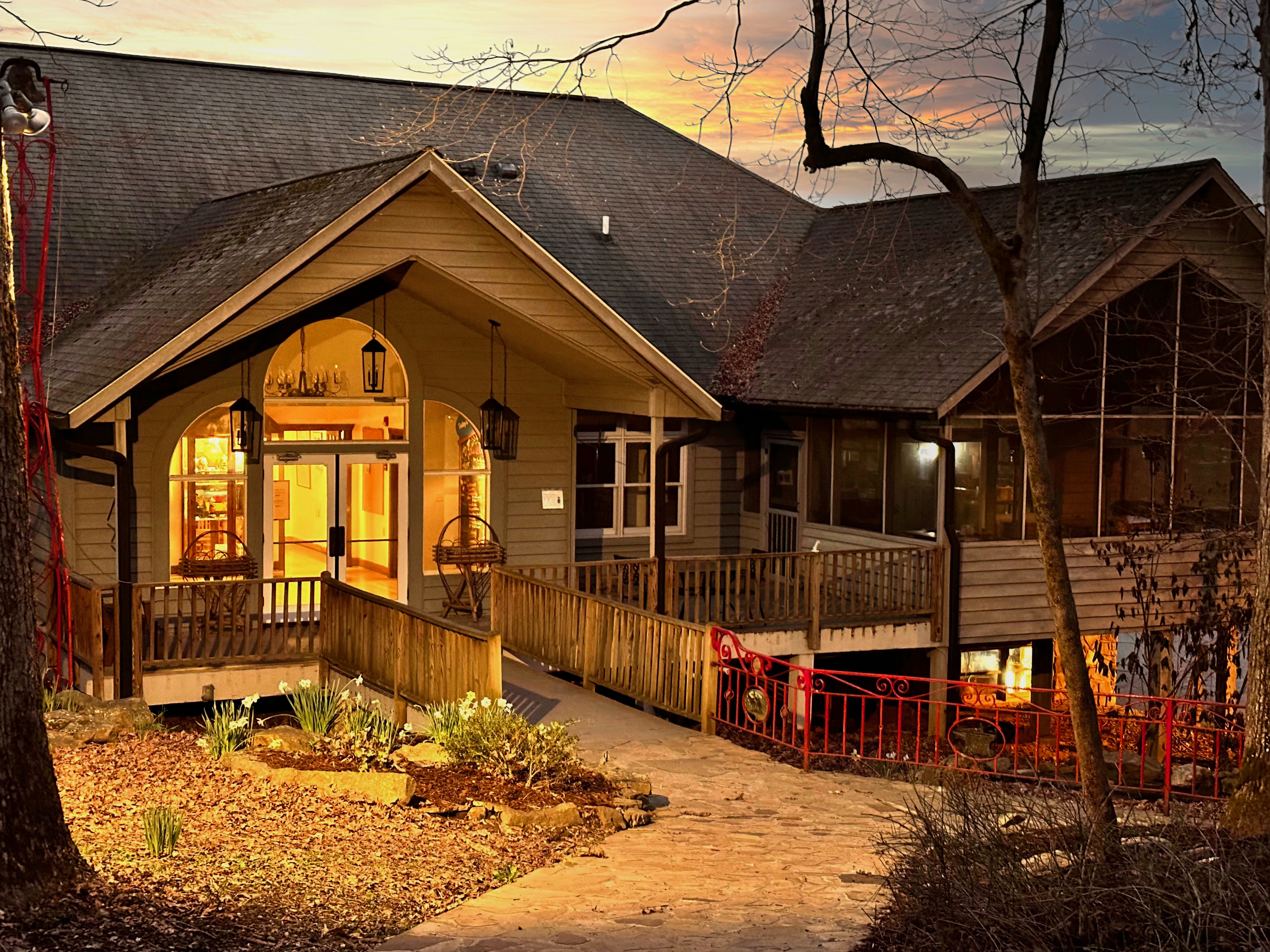
Olive D Campbell Dining Hall and Craft Shop (1992)

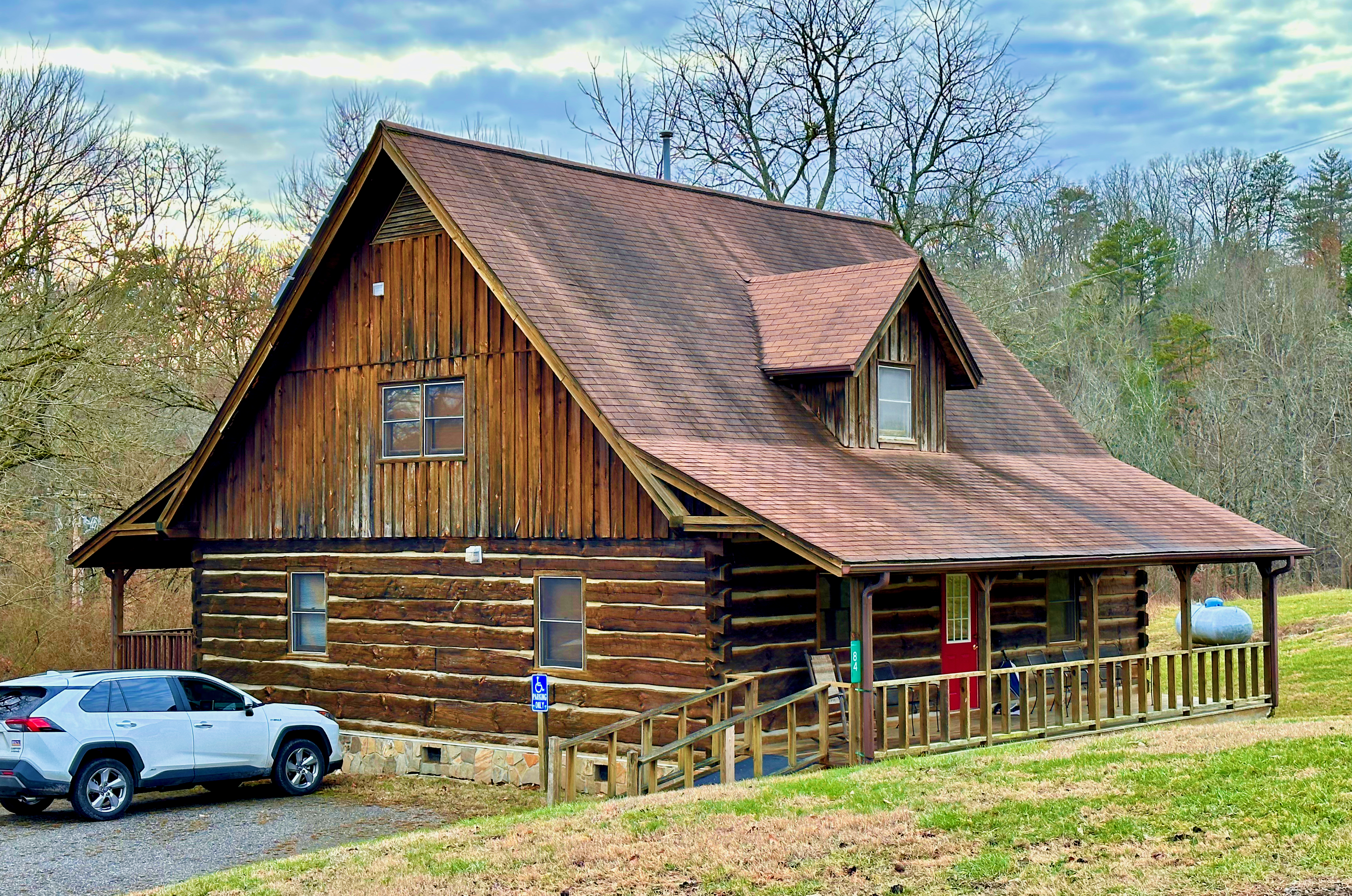
Log House (1988)

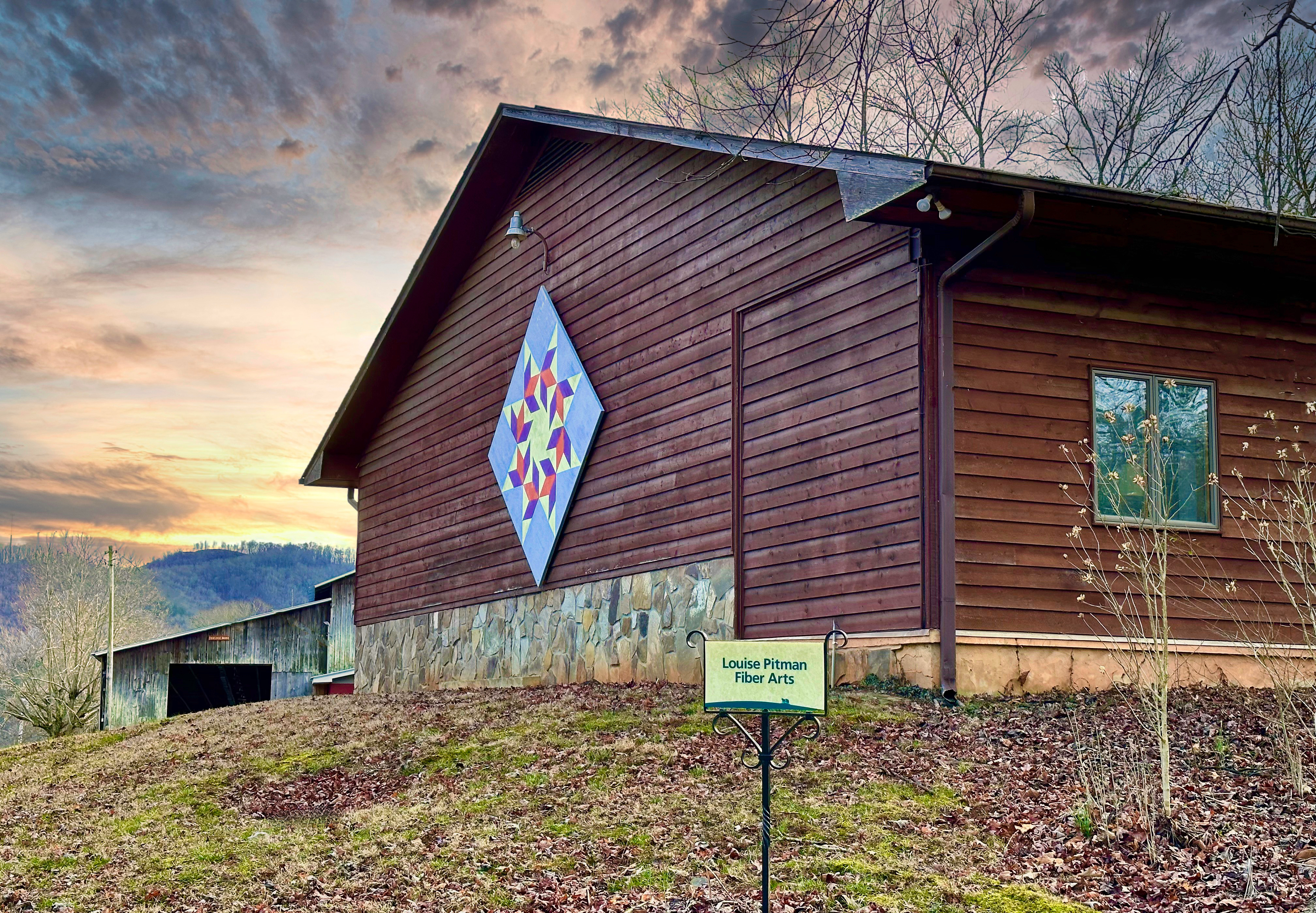
Pitman Fiber Arts Building (1983)

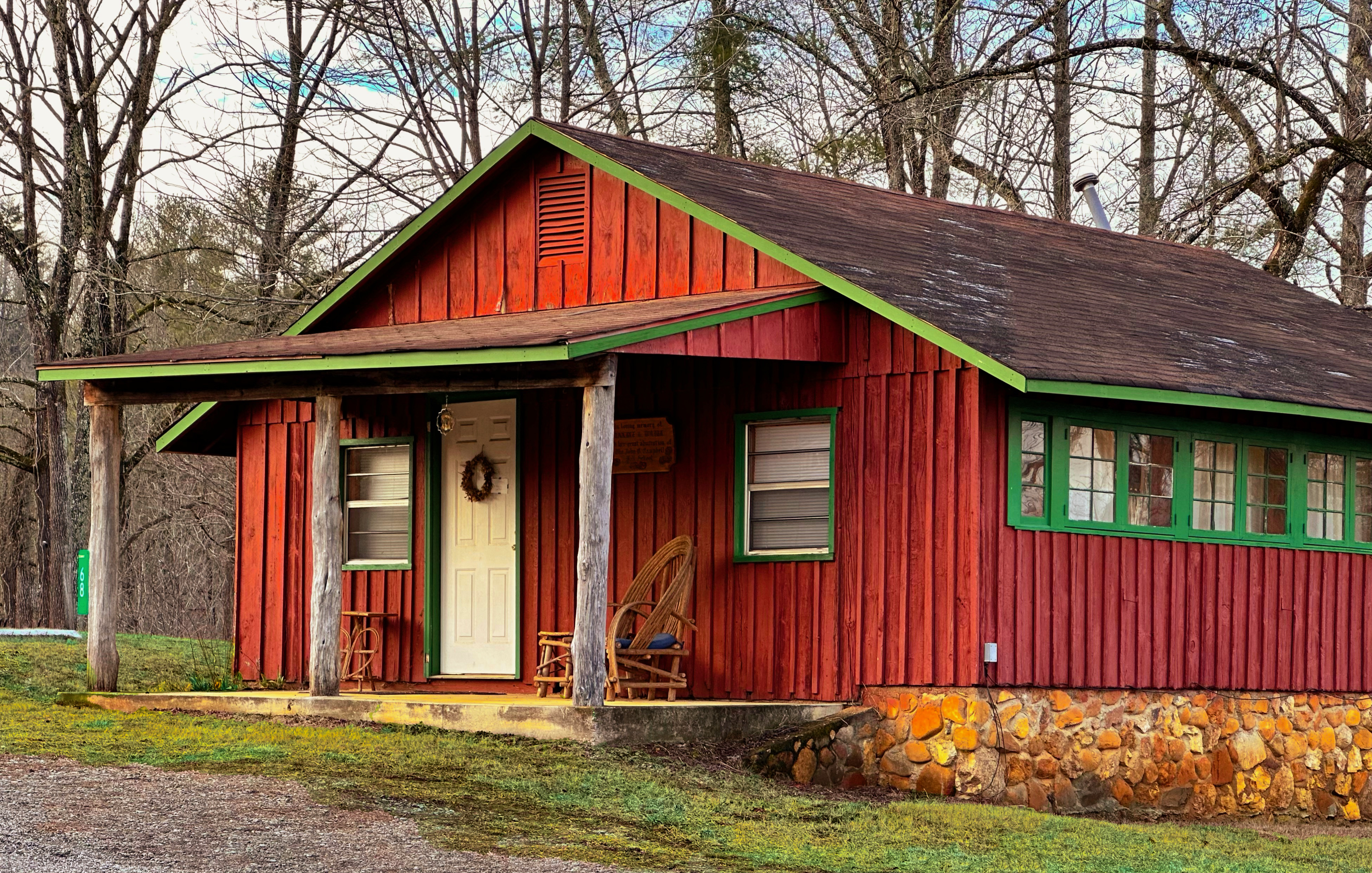
Little Rock (1981)

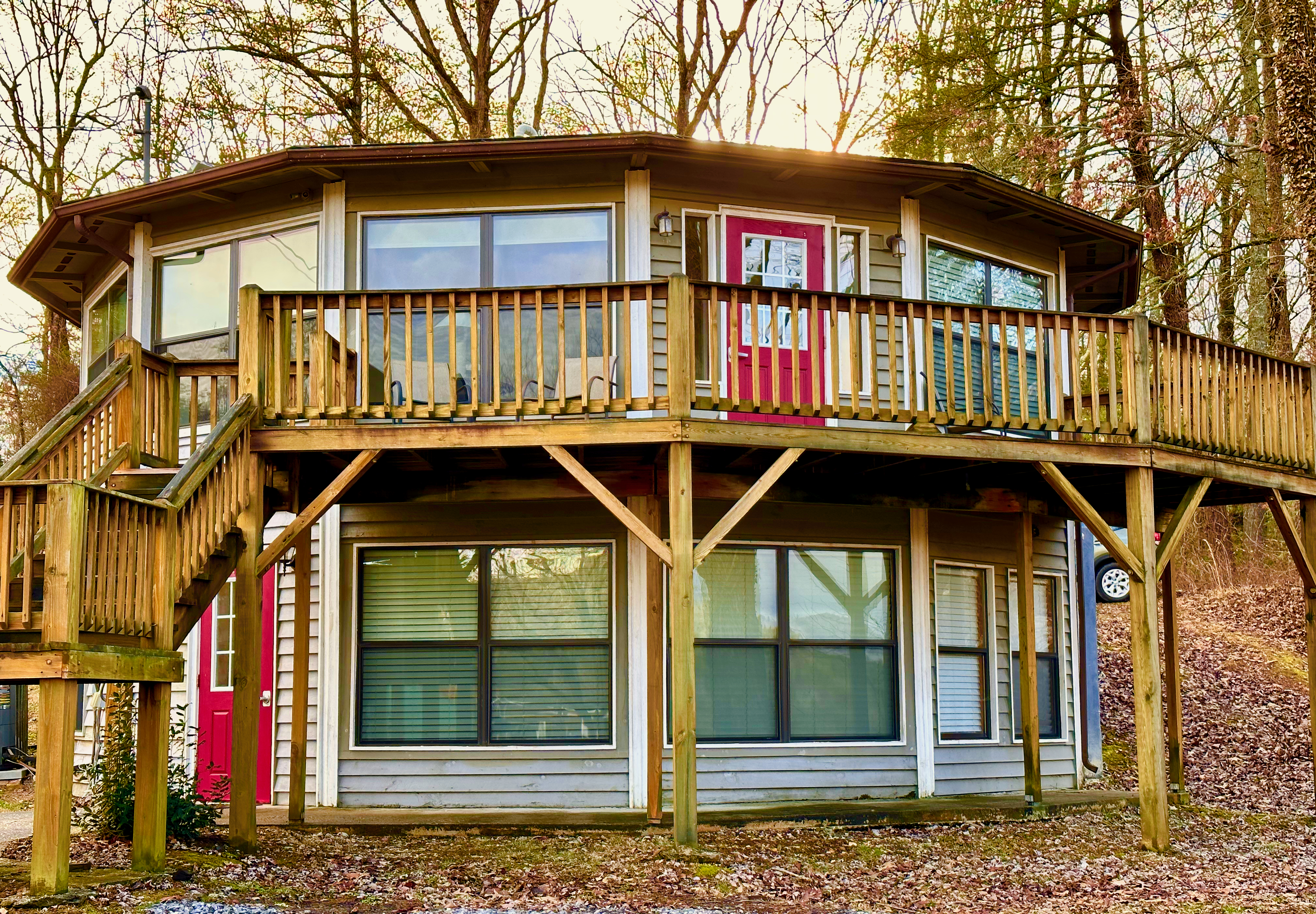
Hubbell House (1972, renovated 2007)

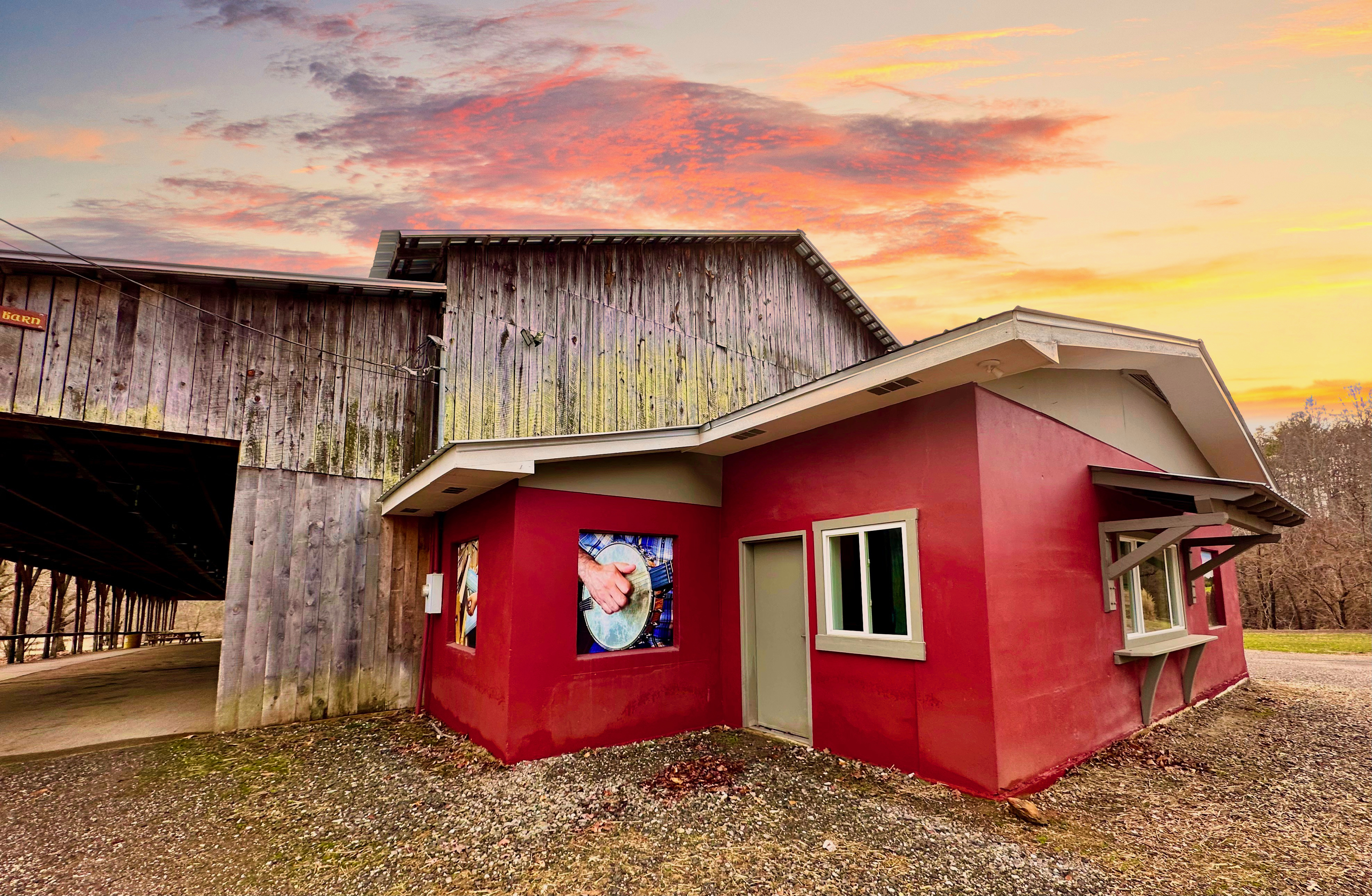
Festival Barn (1971)

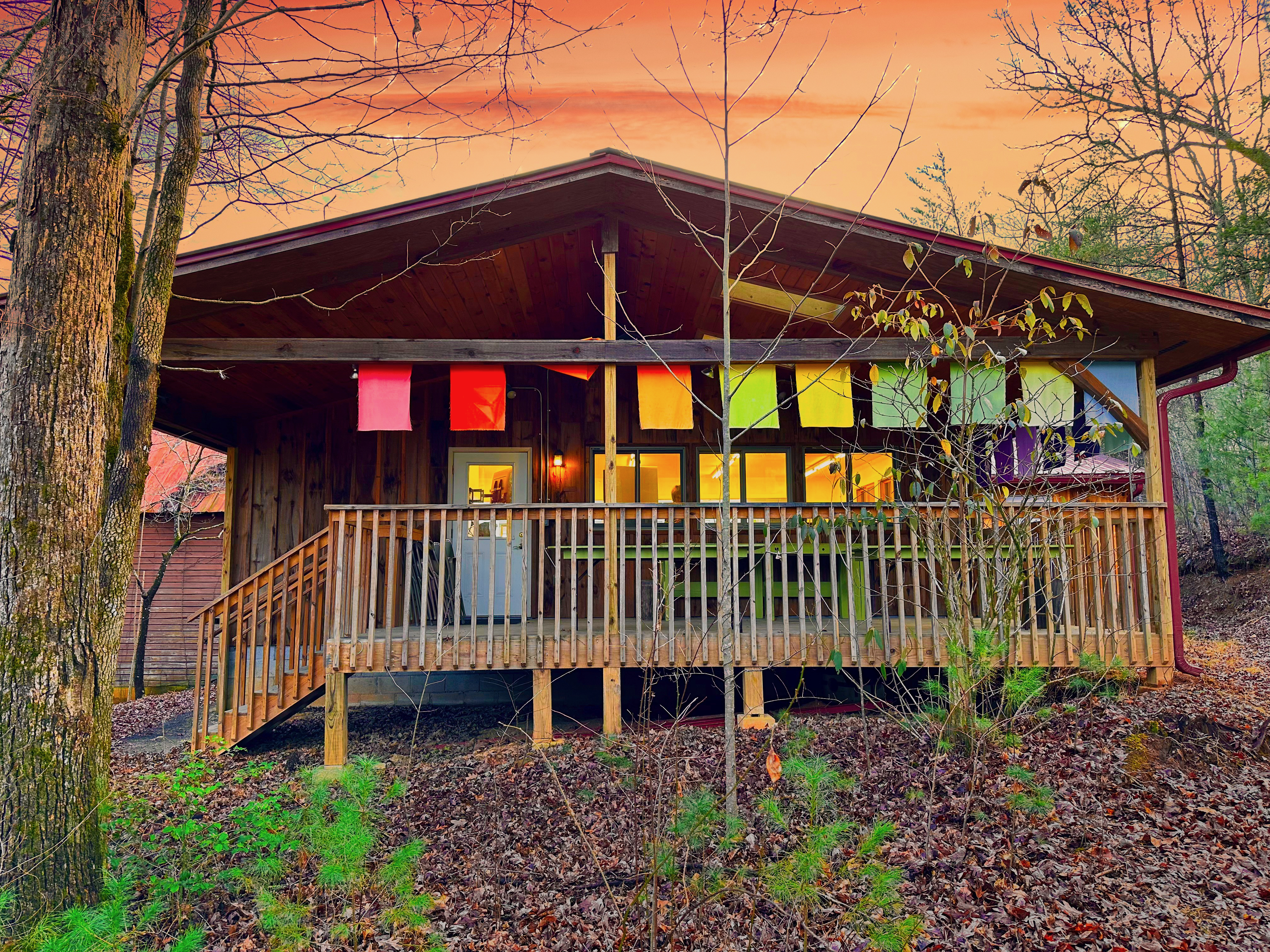
D. X. Ross jewelry & Metals Studio (1970, expanded 2011)

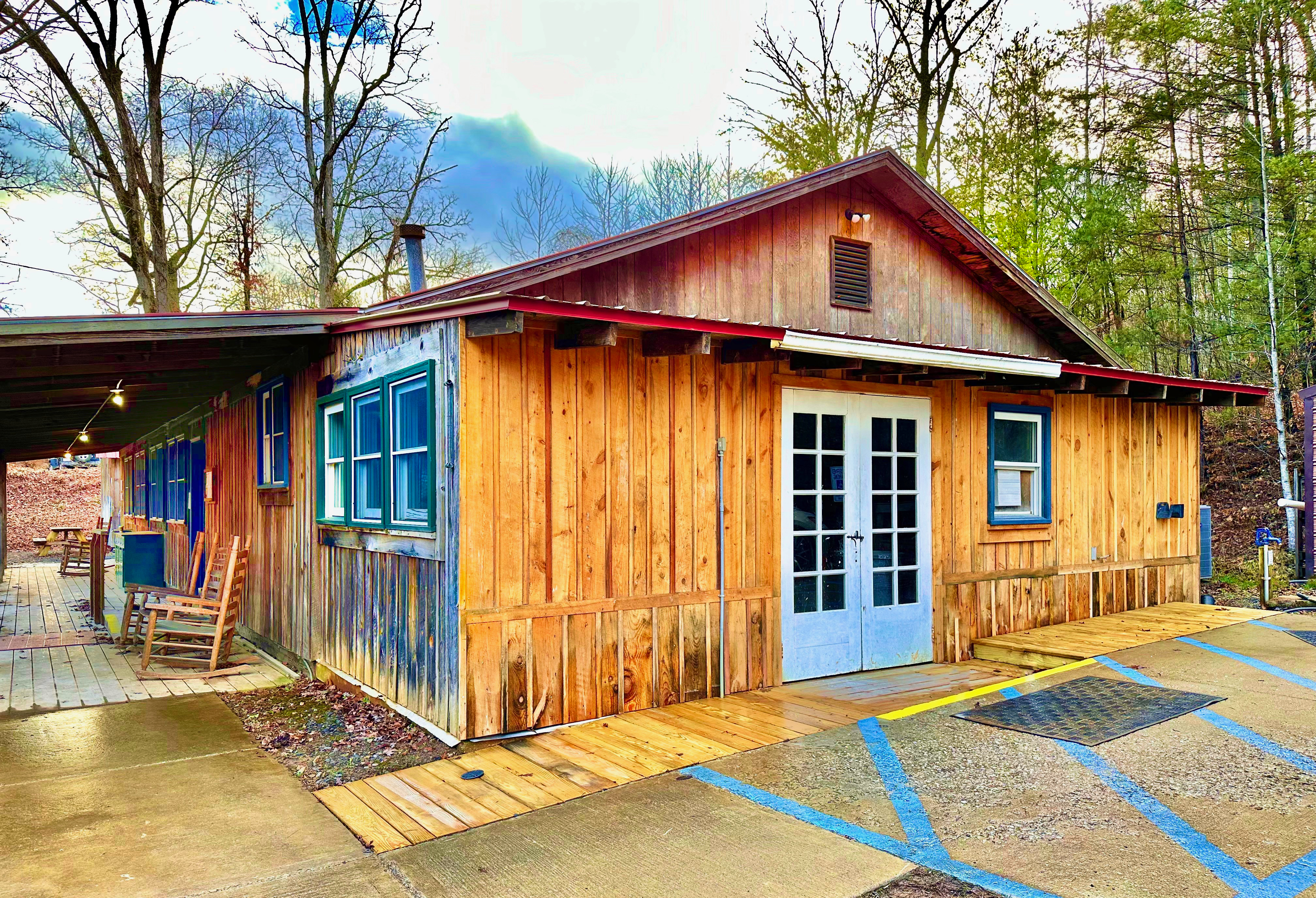
Clay and Enameling Studio (Bef. 1969)

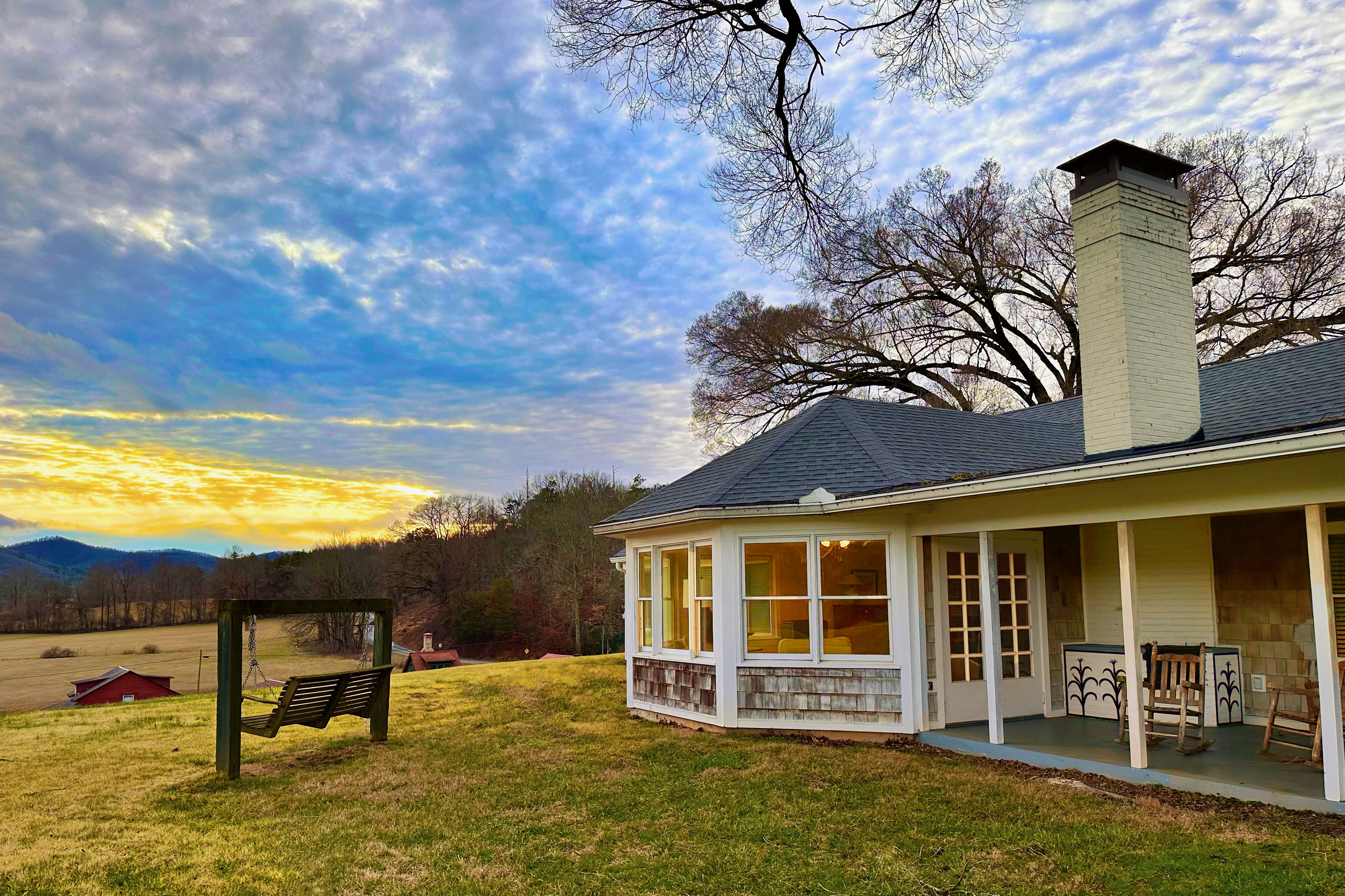
Orchard House (1954)

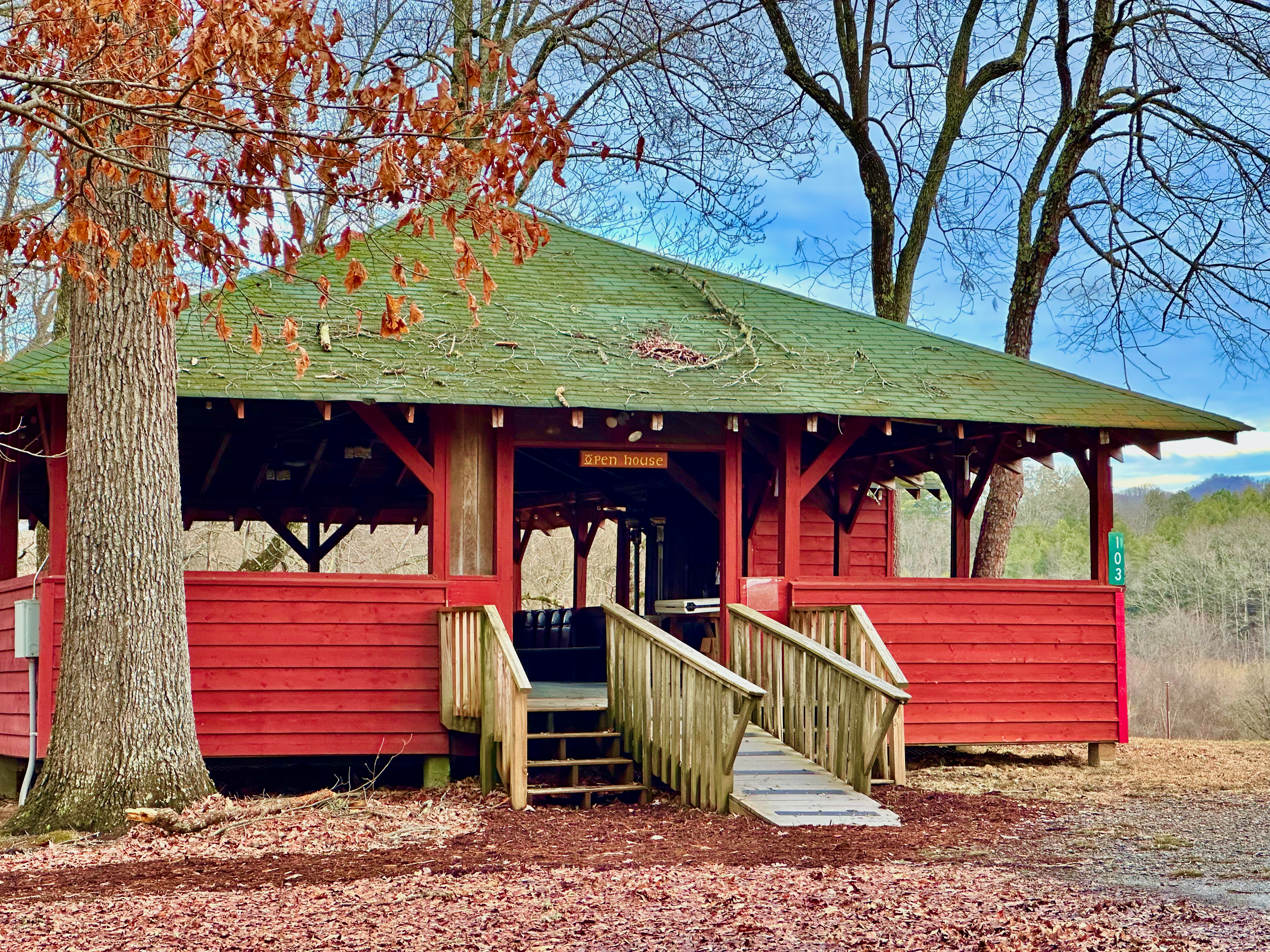
Open House (1947)

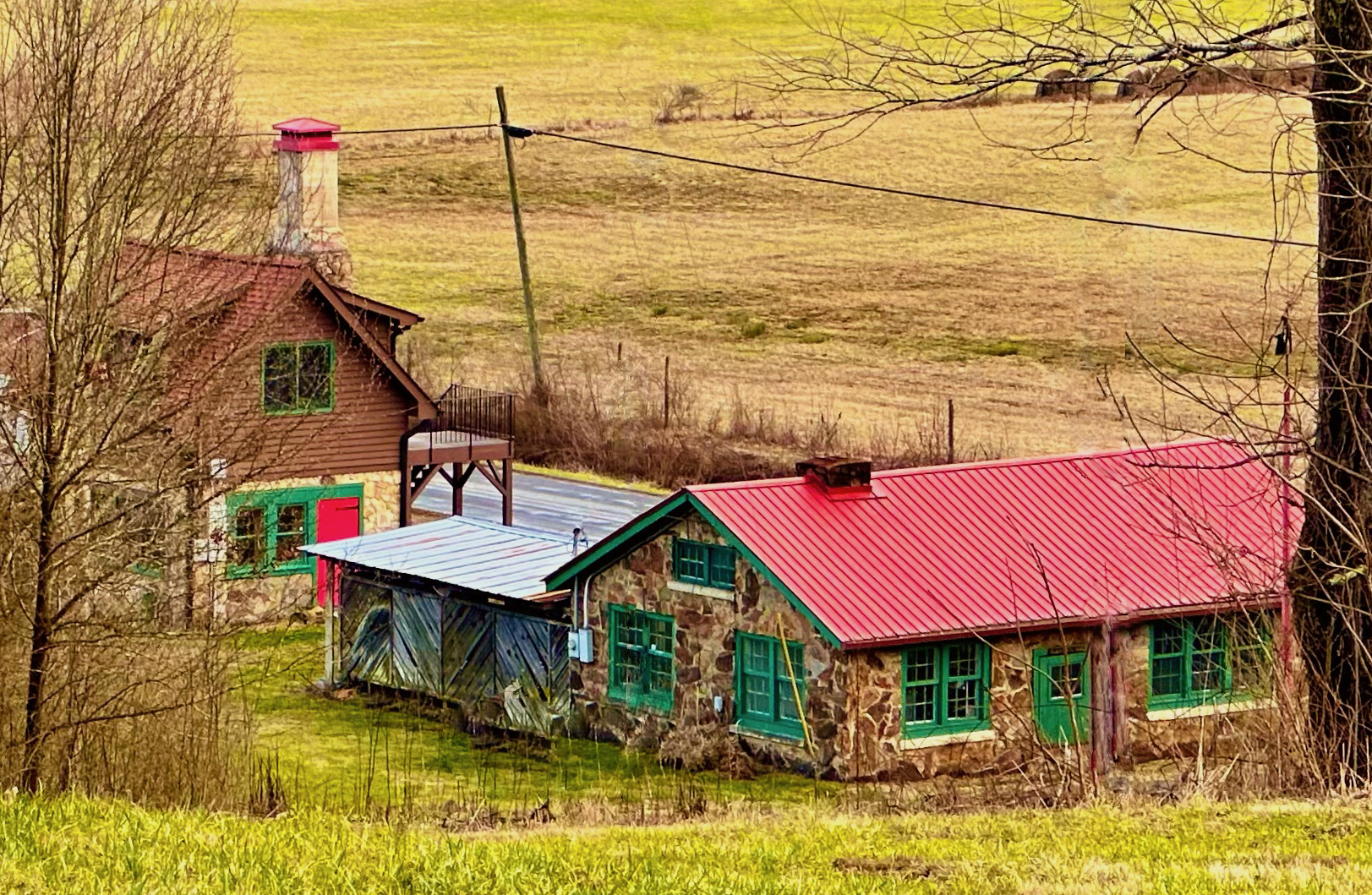
Ironwood Forge (1933–1946)

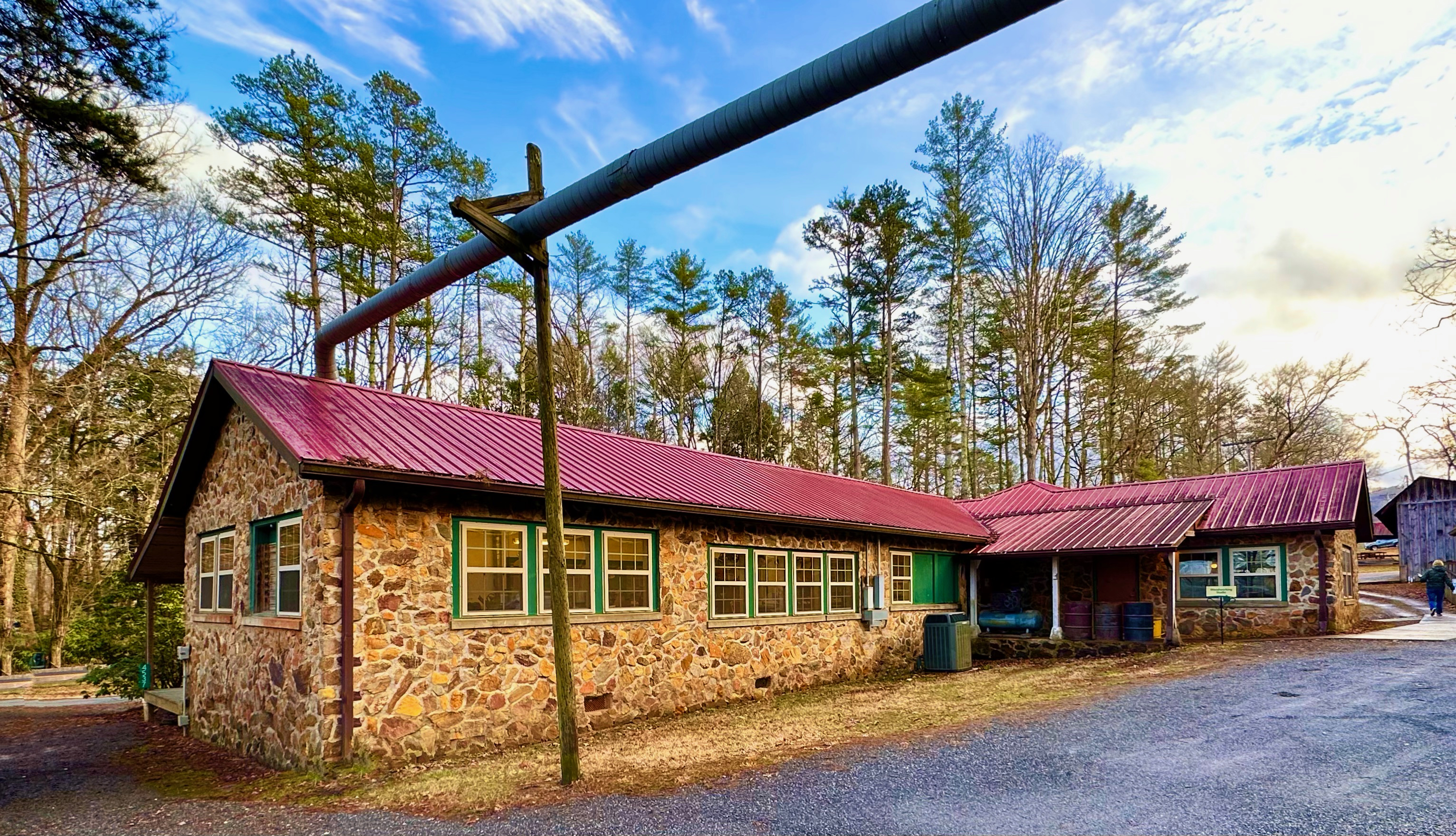
Woodworking Studio (1945, expanded 1997)

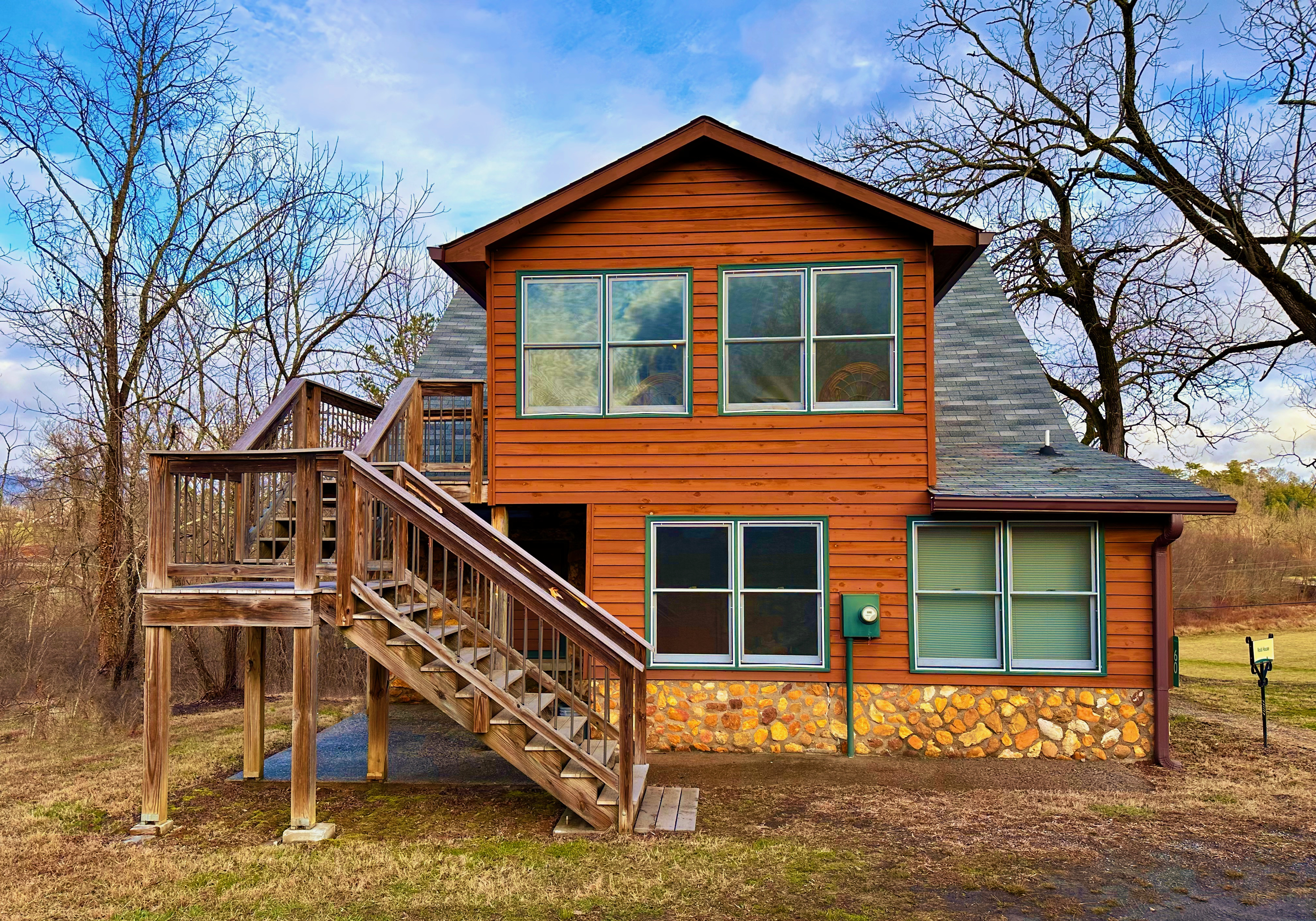
Rock House (C. 1932, remodeled in 1990s)

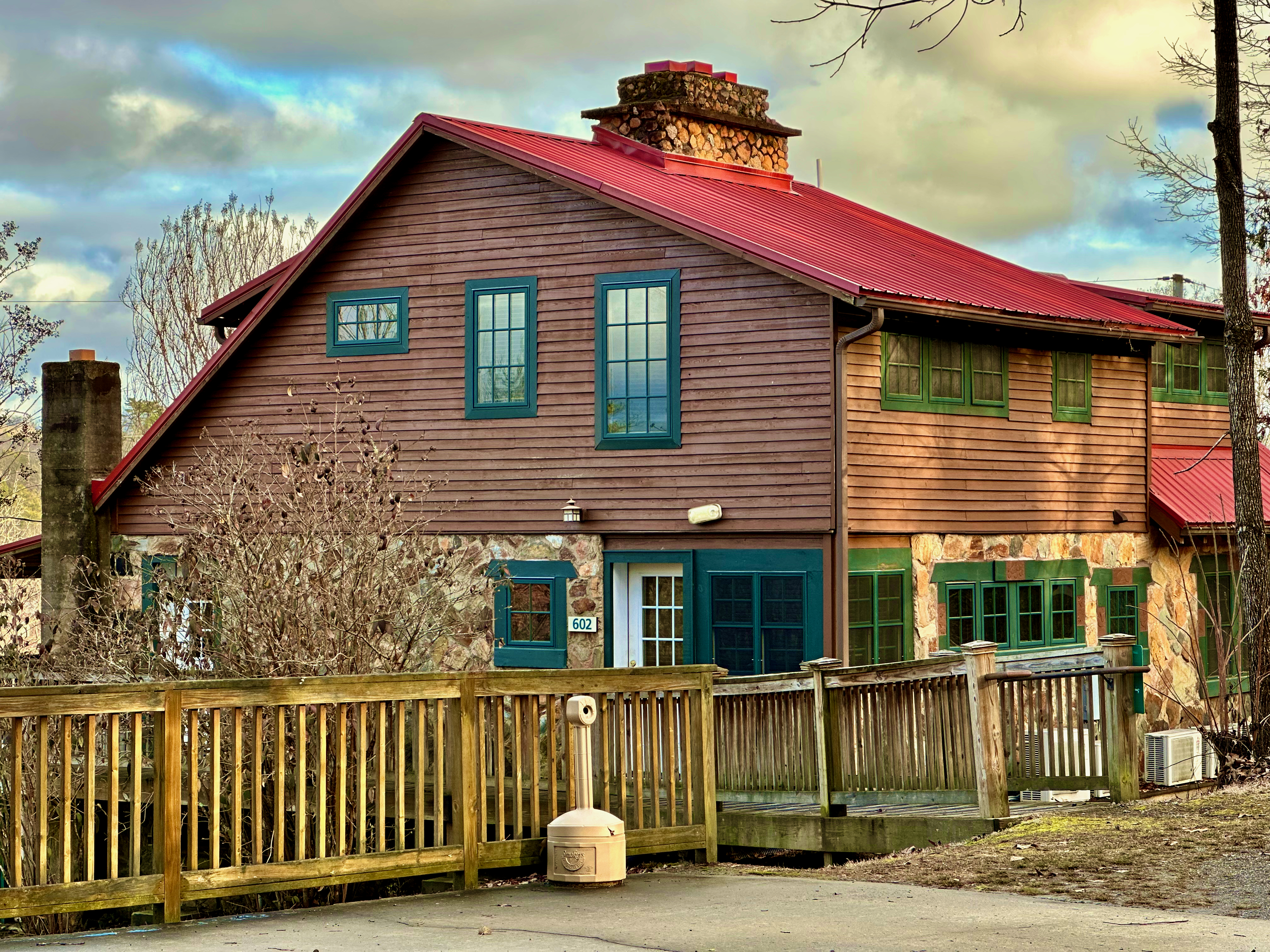
Hill House (C. 1932, renovated 2011)

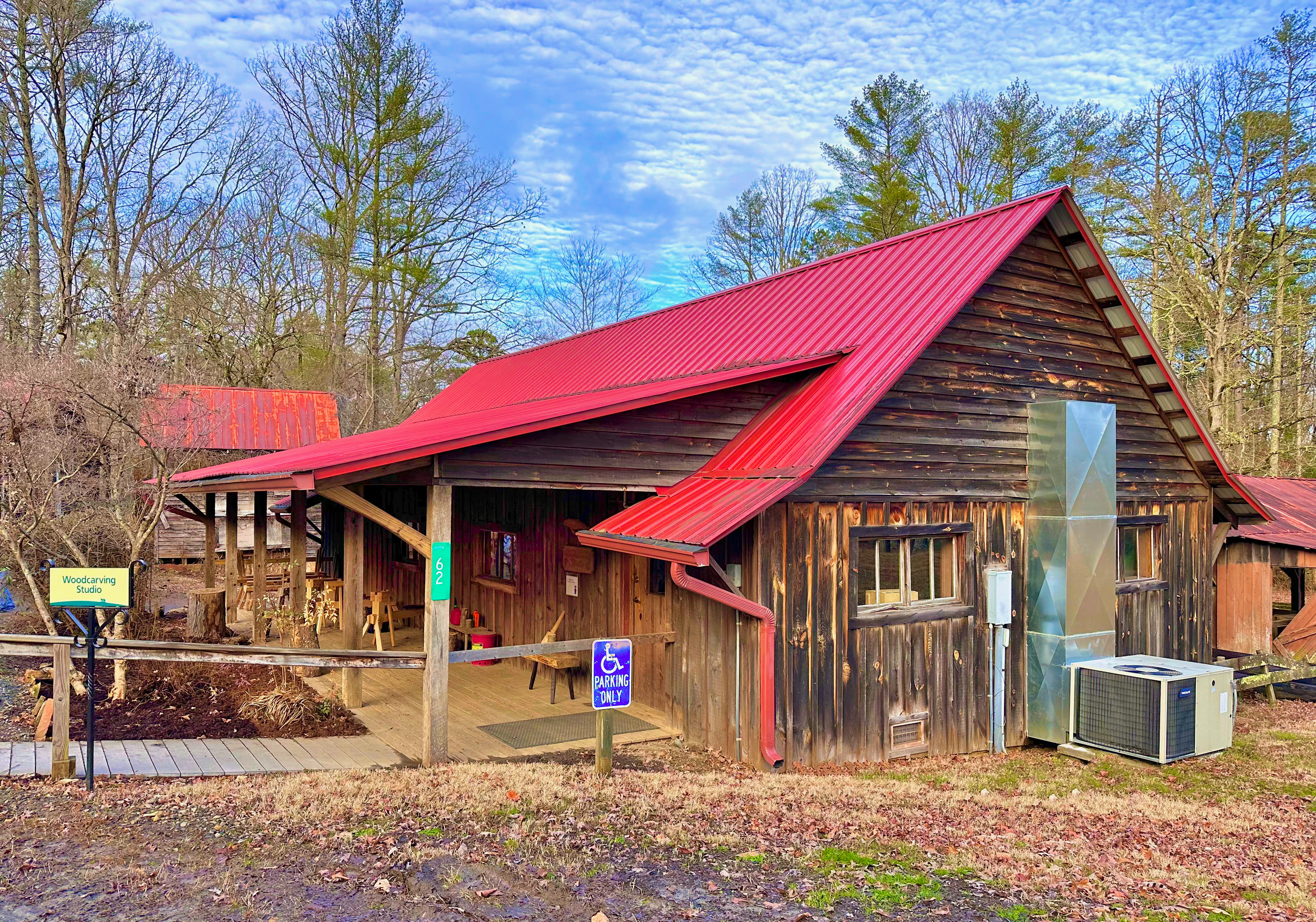
Woodcarving Studio (1932)

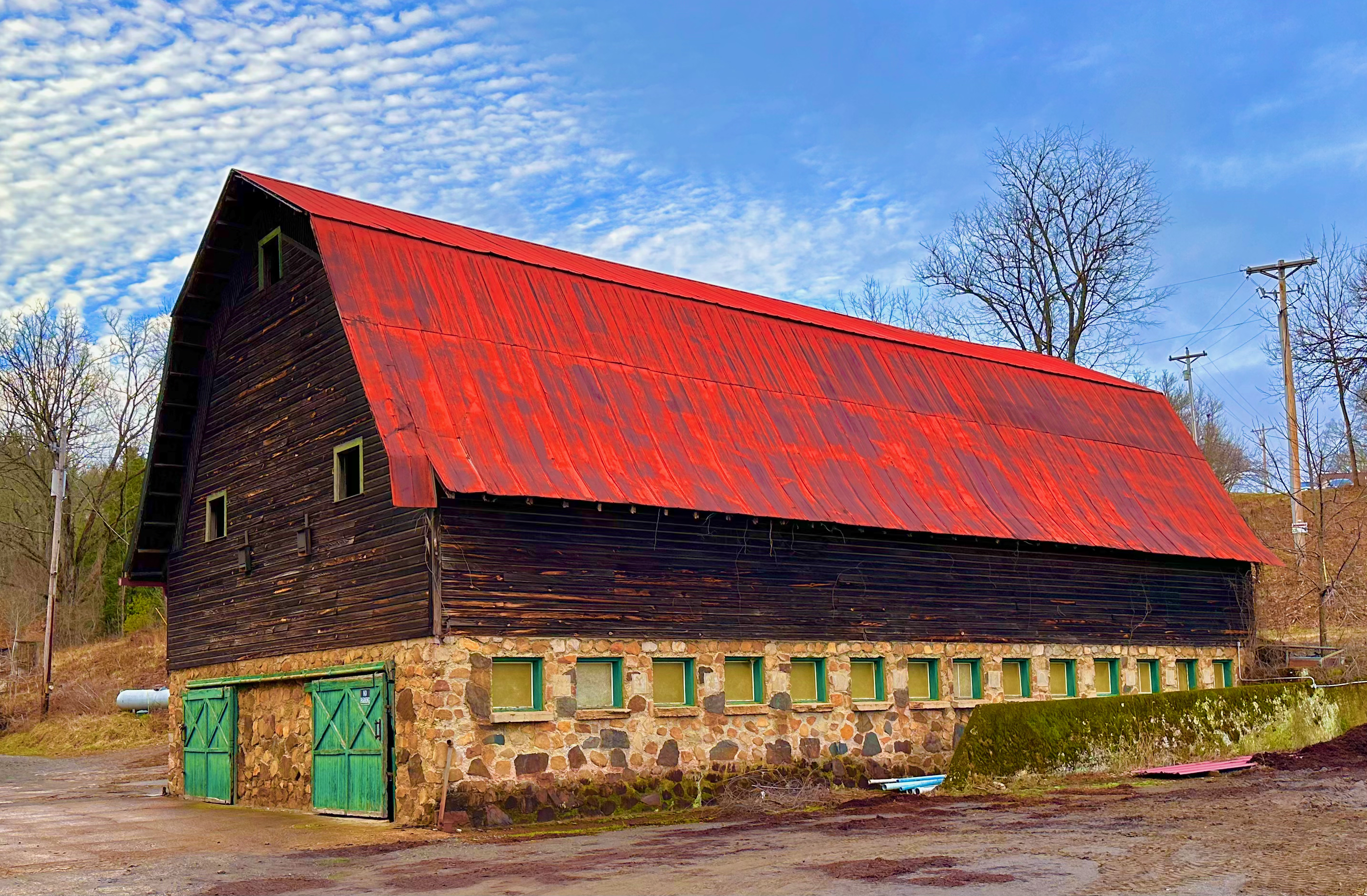
Big Barn (1931)

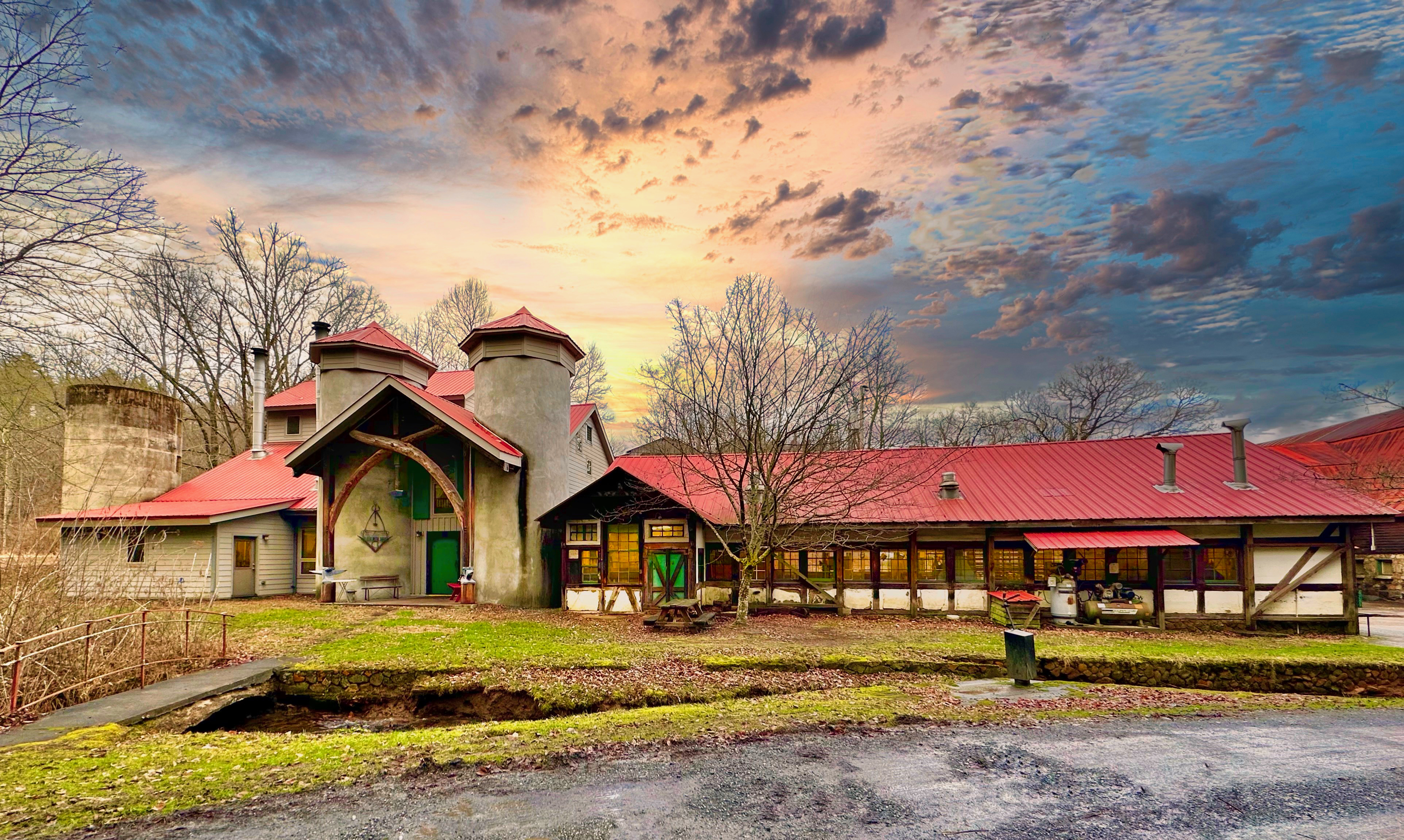
Francis Whitaker Blacksmith Shop (1930, expanded 2010)

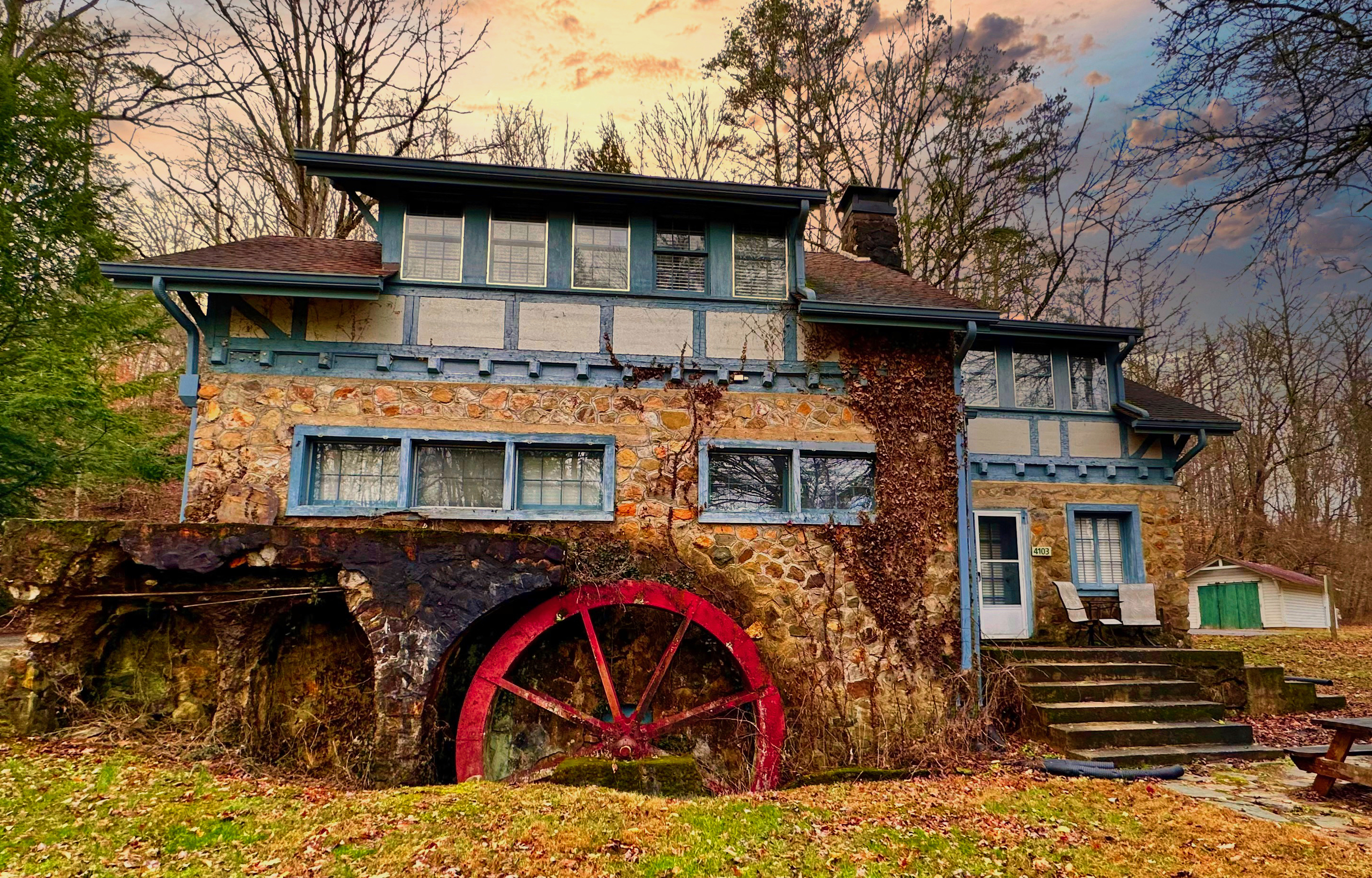
Mill House (1928)

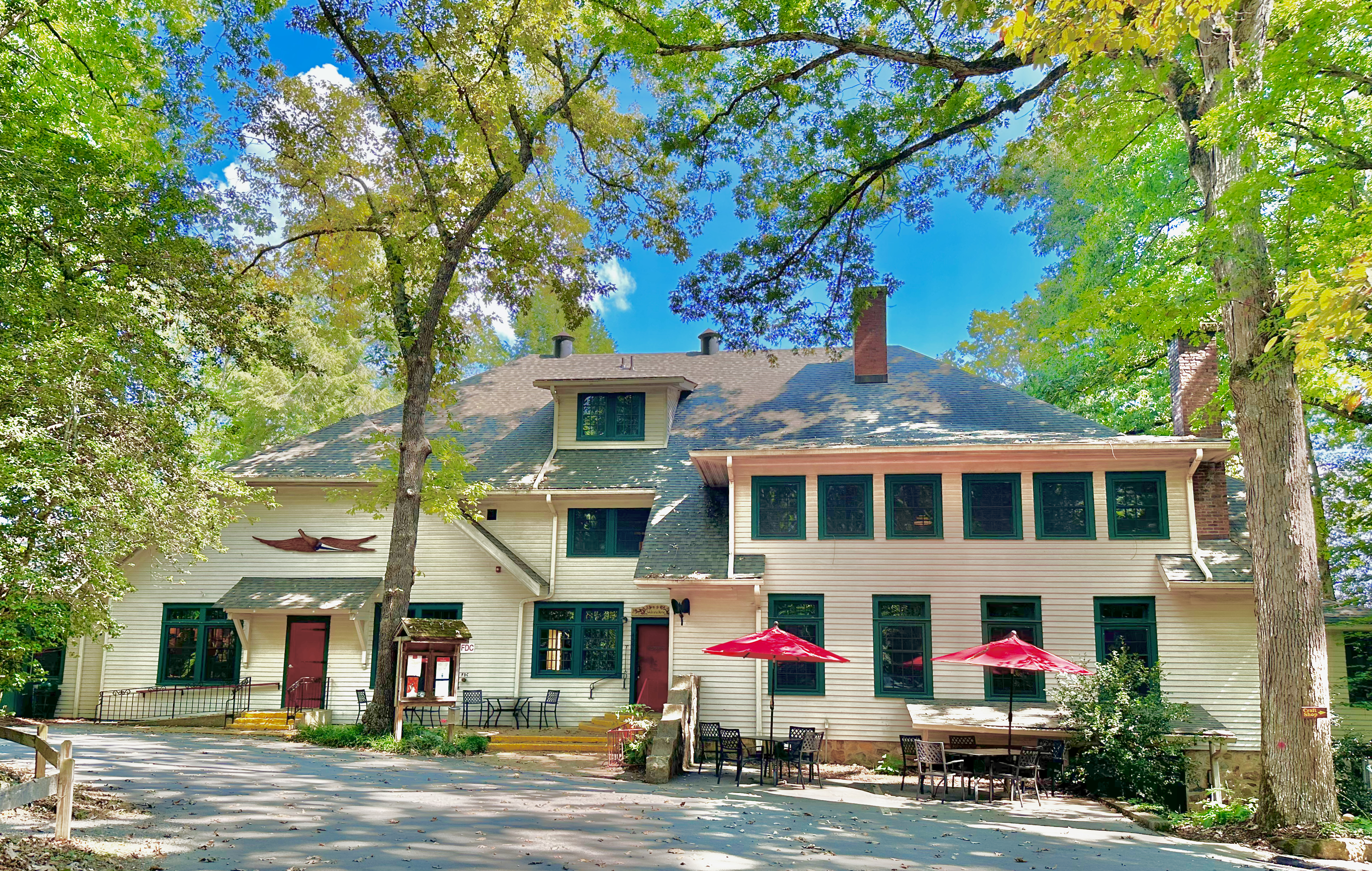
Keith House (1927, expanded 1929)

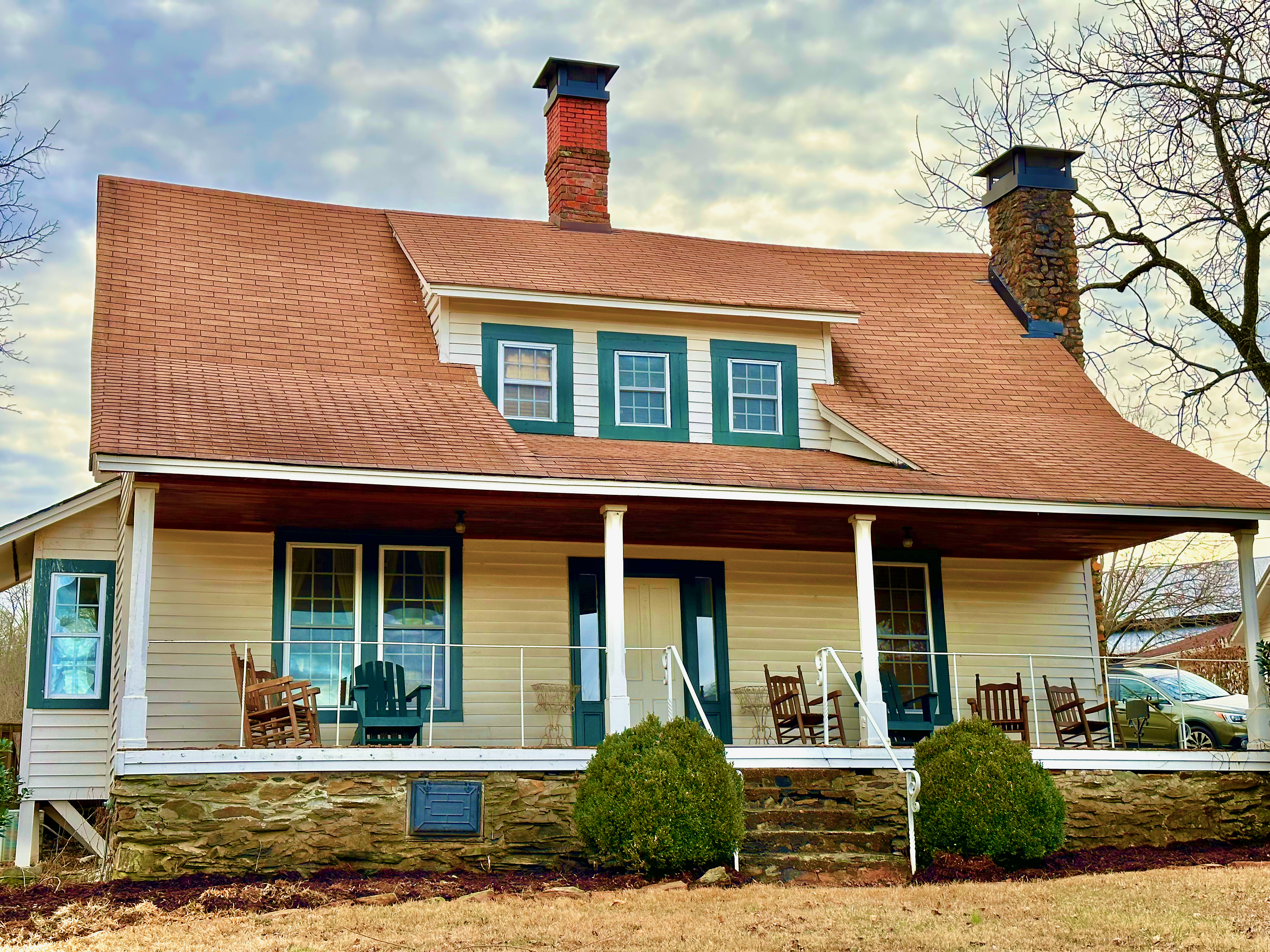
Farm House (Bef.1925, renovated 2002)

=== Other buildings ===
- Maintenance Building (2004)
- Bidstrup House (1982)
- Little House (1981)
- Campground (1970s)
- Log Barn (1970)
- The Cottage (1960s)
- History Center (1939, renovated 2018)
- Log Cabin Museum (1897, reconstructed 1926)

== Directors ==
1. Olive Dame Campbell (1925–1946)
2. Dagnall Folger (1946–1950)
3. Howard Kester (1950–1951)
4. George Bidstrup (1952–1967)
5. John Ramsey (1967–1973)
6. Wayne Kniffen (1973–1974)
7. Gus and Maggie Masters (1974–1976)
8. Esther Manchester (1976–1980)
9. Bob Fink (1980–1985)
10. Bob Grove (Interim) (1985)
11. Ron Hill (1985–1991)
12. Perry Kelley (Interim) (1991–1992)
13. Jan Davidson (1992–2017)
14. Phil Mattox (Interim) (2017)
15. Jerry Jackson (2017–2023)
16. Bethany Chaney (2023–present)

== Notable alumni and educators ==
- Aubrey Atwater – folk musician
- Riley Baugus – folk musician
- Jason Bivens – Forged in Fire champion
- Georgia Bonesteel – quilting teacher
- Frank Brannon – book and paper artist and teacher
- Cynthia Bringle – pottery instructor
- Olive Dame Campbell – founder
- Claire Cunningham – CEO and founder of Lessonface
- Bob Dalsemer – former music and dance coordinator who was an internationally known square and contra dance writer and caller
- Donald Davis – author and storyteller
- Helen Dingman – creator of the Southern Highland Craft Guild
- Rayna Gellert – singer-songwriter
- Phil Jamison – musician and square dance caller
- Loyal Jones – folklorist and writer
- Raymond Kane McLain – bluegrass musician
- Bettye Kimbrell – quilting teacher
- Evie Ladin – musician, singer-songwriter, and dancer
- Homer Ledford – instrument maker and bluegrass musician
- Susan Morgan Leveille – weaving teacher
- Dan Levenson – music instructor
- Deborah Needleman – former editor-in-chief of WSJ and T: The New York Times Style Magazine attended in 2018
- John Jacob Niles – composer and singer who first performed I Wonder as I Wander at the folk school
- David Rakoff – writer, editor, and former board of directors member
- Harley Refsal – wood carver
- Jean Ritchie – singer, songwriter, and Appalachian dulcimer player
- Stephen Seifert – musician
- Heidi Swedberg – actress and musician
- Seth Tepfer – dance caller and writer
- Doris Ulmann – photographer
- Francis Whitaker – blacksmith

== See also ==
- National Register of Historic Places listings in Cherokee County, North Carolina
- Appalachian folk art
