= Raúl Cabrera =

Ecuadorian surfer and movie director (born 1976)

Raúl Cabrera at Ojo Loco Film Festival in Guayaquil, Ecuador on November 14th 2013

Fabricio Raúl Cabrera Orozco (born July 16, 1976), known professionally as Raúl Cabrera, is an Ecuadorian movie director and a frequent traveler, having visited over 80 countries. He has been working on Nómad-A, a documentary, from 2011 to present, in an effort to showcase people leading uncommon lives.

== Early life ==
Cabrera was born in Guayaquil, Ecuador, into a socio-economically privileged family and is the youngest of six children. When Cabrera was 9, he and his parents went to the US to seek medical treatment for his father, who had terminal cancer. After draining the family’s finances, his father died, and his mother was left to raise six children on her own.

Cabrera grew up surfing in Engabao, a small beach town two hours outside of Guayaquil, staying summer after summer earning the nickname “randanjause,” which comes from a surfing maneuver. At 15 he visited Montañita, a popular tourist destination in Ecuador, taking up residence on people’s couches and adopting himself into numerous families. He would introduce himself to strangers he met on the beach, using his already acquired three languages, English, French and Spanish, to communicate with people from all over the world, taking names and numbers to later use in his travels. At the age of 19 he moved out, traveling around Latin America visiting people he met in Montañita.

== Career ==
=== Travel ===
Cabrera was interviewed for Surfer's Path Magazine where he described the difficulties in traveling abroad with an Ecuadorian passport. Although when in New Zealand he worked and studied which enabled him to get citizenship and subsequently a passport that would allow him greater access to the world. With the help of friends he met along the way he was able to obtain visas and visited over 80 countries.

The work was as varied as the countries he visited. He had mastered Japanese, Portuguese, English, Italian, Indonesian, Spanish and French, that being so, being a language teacher came naturally. He worked as a language teacher in Japan, New Caledonia, France and other countries. He was also a bricklayer and seller, motivational speaker, a licensed professional snowboarding instructor and a crewman on the Peace Boat with which he toured the world.

=== Nómad-A ===
Nómad-A is a documentary about 25 ordinary people living uncommon lives from all over the world. Shooting took place from September 2011 through August 2013 and filmed in Andorra, Australia, Chile, Denmark, Ecuador, England, France, Germany, Ireland, Japan, Morocco, Namibia, Netherlands, New Caledonia, New Zealand, Panama, Peru, Portugal, Scotland, Spain, Sweden and the United States.

Although the main thread of the documentary is Cabrera himself, it also shares the stories of a number of other "Nómad-A’s" that Cabrera met throughout his journey.

== Education ==
- 1980-1982: Instituto Particular Abdón Calderón, Guayaquil, Ecuador (Primary School)
- 1983-1990: Unidad Educativa San Agustín, Guayaquil, Ecuador (Primary and Secondary School)
- 1991-1994: Swiss International College, Guayaquil, Ecuador (Computer Science)
- 1995-1997: Universidad Católica de Santiago, Guayaquil, Ecuador (International Business Management Engineering)
- 2000-2002: University of Otago, New Zealand (International Bachelor of Commerce and French)
- 2004-2005: University of Canterbury, New Zealand (Post Graduate Diploma in Education and Pedagogy)
