= John B. Stephenson =

- Born: September 26, 1937; Staunton, Virginia, U.S.
- Died: December 6, 1994 (aged 57)
- Education: College of William and Mary (BA); University of North Carolina at Chapel Hill (MA, PhD)
- Occupations: Sociologist, Educator
- Years active: 1961–1994
- Employers: Lees-McRae College; University of Kentucky; Berea College
- Known for: Appalachian studies, President of Berea College
- Notable work: Shiloh: A Mountain Community (1968); Appalachia in the Sixties (1972); Ford: A Village in the West Highlands of Scotland (1984)
- Title: 7th President of Berea College
- Term: 1984–1994
- Predecessor: Willis D. Weatherford Jr.
- Successor: Larry D. Shinn
- Spouse: Jane Ellen Baucom (m. 1962)
- Awards: American Council on Education Fellow (1973–74); Fulbright Senior Research Scholar (1981)

John B. Stephenson (September 26, 1937 – December 6, 1994) was a sociologist and scholar of Appalachia, a founder of the Appalachian Studies Conference, and president of Berea College from 1984 to 1994.

== Early life and education ==
John B. Stephenson was born in Staunton, Virginia, on September 26, 1937.

He earned a B.A. degree in sociology from the College of William and Mary in Virginia in 1959, and M.A. (1961) and Ph.D. (1966) degrees in sociology from the University of North Carolina at Chapel Hill. His dissertation, a community study of Celo, North Carolina, became his first book, Shiloh: A Mountain Community (1968).

== Teaching career ==
He began his teaching career at Lees-McRae College in Banner Elk, North Carolina, from 1961 to 1964, where he met and married a colleague, Jane Ellen Baucom, in 1962. After returning to Chapel Hill to complete his doctoral studies, he joined department of sociology at the University of Kentucky in Lexington in the fall of 1966. Connecting with the emerging field of Appalachian studies, he co-edited Appalachia in the Sixties (1972) with sociology graduate student David Walls. He served as dean of undergraduate studies from 1978 to 1981, as special assistant to the chancellor in 1983–84, and was the first director of the Appalachian Center, which he was instrumental in helping organize, from 1979 to 1984. During this time he became an incorporator and first chair of the Appalachian Studies Conference (now known as the Appalachian Studies Association).

== President of Berea College ==
In 1984 he was appointed the seventh president of Berea College in Berea, Kentucky, the first president of the liberal arts college to come from a public university. During his tenure as president, Berea College reemphasized its historic commitment to African American and Appalachian students. The college also took initiatives to support women, including Jane Stephenson's New Opportunity School for Women. Faculty and staff salaries were increased significantly.

John Stephenson established ties with a diverse group of notable people whom he brought to speak at Berea College, from Roots author Alex Haley, and Archbishop Desmond Tutu of South Africa, to the Dalai Lama. Stephenson established the Tibetan scholarship program, which supports students at Berea College from the Tibetan exile community in India. He was also a successful fundraiser; during his tenure as president, the Berea College endowment increased from $120 to $360 million. Stephenson retired in July 1994, several years after he was diagnosed with leukemia. He died suddenly after a viral infection in December 1994.

He was selected as an American Council on Education Fellow in 1973–74, and as a Fulbright Senior Research Scholar in 1981, which he used for research in Scotland which was presented in his book, Ford: A Village in the West Highlands of Scotland (1984). He served on boards of the Kentucky Literacy Foundation, the national Elderhostel program, the Frontier Nursing Service, and the Appalachian Regional Hospitals.

== Books by John B. Stephenson ==
- Shiloh: A Mountain Community. Lexington: University of Kentucky Press, 1968.
- Editor, with David S. Walls, Appalachia in the Sixties: Decade of Reawakening. Lexington: University Press of Kentucky, 1972. ISBN 0-8131-0135-2
- Ford: A Village in the West Highlands of Scotland. Lexington: University Press of Kentucky, 1984. ISBN 0-8131-1507-8
- A Scottish Diary. Photographs by J. David Stephenson. San Francisco: Custom and Limited Editions, 1990.
