= David Walls (academic) =

American sociologist and activist

David Walls (born October 21, 1941) is an activist and academic who has made significant contributions to Appalachian studies and to the popular understanding of social movements. He is professor emeritus of sociology at Sonoma State University (SSU) in California, where he was dean of extended education from 1984 to 2000.

== Early life and education ==
Born David Stuart Walls in Chicago, Illinois, he grew up on the Upper Peninsula of Michigan and in Duluth, Minnesota. He finished the last two years of high school in Coral Gables, Florida. He attended the University of California, Berkeley as an undergraduate from 1959 to 1964, earning a bachelor's degree in economics. While at Berkeley, he was active in SLATE, the campus political party, and served a term on the board of directors of the Associated Students of the University of California.

== Work in Washington, DC ==
After graduating from UC Berkeley, he began work in 1964 as a management intern at the Department of Health, Education and Welfare in Washington, DC, serving as an assistant to Mary E. Switzer, commissioner of the Vocational Rehabilitation Administration, and her deputy. In 1965 he transferred to the newly established War on Poverty headquarters, the Office of Economic Opportunity (OEO), where he worked in the Community Action Program, assisting Jule Sugarman with the launch of Project Head Start and funding student volunteer programs.

== Work with Appalachian Volunteers ==
In fall 1966 Walls joined the staff of the Appalachian Volunteers (AV), a nonprofit agency conducting community organizing projects in the central Appalachian coalfields of eastern Kentucky, southern West Virginia, and southwestern Virginia. He moved to Harlan County, Kentucky to supervise VISTA volunteers. A year later he became field coordinator for the AV in the state, and moved to Berea, Kentucky. When founding executive director Milton Ogle resigned in August 1968, Walls became the director for the organization's final year. Although his initial work in Harlan County involved organizing low-income people to demand representation on the Cumberland Valley's community action agency, he soon was drawn into the growing opposition to strip-mining for coal, after a landslide from a strip-mine bench threatened a house at the head of Jones Creek, above Verda on the Clover Fork of the Cumberland River in Harlan County. The AV's support for people opposing strip-mining for coal led to sedition charges in Pike County, Kentucky in August 1967 against an AV staff member and two workers for the Southern Conference Education Fund. Although the sedition charges were quickly dismissed by federal judge and former Kentucky governor Bert T. Combs, the case undermined OEO support for the AV.

After Republican governor Louie B. Nunn was elected in November 1967, the AV faced an investigation by the Kentucky Un-American Activities Committee (KUAC). Walls issued a statement challenging the constitutionality of KUAC and the legality of the hearings. He refused an invitation to appear before the committee, but was not issued a subpoena, which he had hoped to challenge in court. In an interview with the Louisville Courier-Journal, Walls summarized the outlook of the AV staff on the coalfield region:

An impatience with the slowness of change and paternalistic government programs; a distrust of experts who think they can solve the problems of poor people; a disgust with the way corruption is taken for granted in the mountains; a trust in the ability of poor people to solve their own problems, given the proper tools and money; a desire to end the colonialistic exploitation of Appalachia by corporations in Pittsburgh and New York and by small cliques of men in county seats; and a belief that the wealth of the area's mineral resources ought to go toward constructing a better way of life for all the people who live here.

Political pressures to terminate funding for the AV finally took their toll, and no further OEO support was forthcoming. After attempting an orderly spin-off or phase-out of AV staff and programs, Walls resigned as executive director in April 1970.

== Activism and Appalachian studies at the University of Kentucky ==
Walls began graduate work in sociology at the University of Kentucky (UK) in fall 1969, while still working part-time for the AV. In fall 1970 he began full-time studies at UK, moving to Lexington, Kentucky, to live with a group of fellow graduate students in Collective One, a politically progressive household of five men and five women. With an offset press in the basement, Collective One printed leaflets for the local anti-Vietnam War and women's movements. The women in the collective were among the initiators of the women's liberation movement in Lexington. Collective members also helped organize participation in local and national demonstrations against the Vietnam War, and helped elect one of their group, Scott Wendelsdorf, to two terms as student body president. Walls married Lucia Gattone, whom he had met in Prestonsburg, Kentucky while working for the AV, at Collective One on Thanksgiving Day, 1971. He received an MA in sociology in 1972 with a thesis comparing dialectical sociology in Peter Berger and Western Marxism. After two years Collective One broke up as members went their separate ways to jobs and other graduate schools.

Remaining at UK, Walls worked toward a doctorate in sociology and edited Appalachia in the Sixties with his faculty mentor John B. Stephenson. In fall 1974, Walls accepted a faculty position of assistant professor in the social work program at UK. He also worked with a group of colleagues to organize the interdisciplinary Appalachian Center at UK, with a mission of promoting Appalachian studies courses, research on the region, and community service. The Appalachian Center was formally established in 1976, with Stephenson named director, and Walls designated associate director. A meeting between Walls and American studies professor Alessandro Portelli during a visit to Rome, Italy, in 1973 led to a long-term exchange program, involving graduate students and faculty, between the UK Appalachian Center and Sapienza University of Rome.

Walls's doctoral research produced several articles and chapters that contributed to the emerging field of Appalachian studies. At the 1975 Appalachian Symposium held at Appalachian State University to honor Cratis D. Williams, Walls presented his paper "On the Naming of Appalachia", which identified the first appearances of "Appalachia" on the maps of early explorers and mapmakers. This conference served as a catalyst for the Appalachian Studies Association. At UK, Walls elaborated on the application of the internal colonialism model to the Appalachian region, first developed by Helen M. Lewis, and collaborated with sociologist Dwight Billings on the sociology of the southern Appalachians, the structure of the coal industry for the Ohio River Basin Energy Study, and the foundations of the university's Appalachian studies curriculum. His Ph.D. in sociology was awarded in 1978.

== Career at Sonoma State University ==
In 1982 Walls returned to California to take a job at Sonoma State University (SSU) as director of sponsored programs and general manager of the SSU Academic Foundation. In 1984 he became the dean of the school of extended education. During his tenure as dean, SSU introduced a BA degree completion program with a distance learning component, MA degrees in liberal studies and computer and engineering science, and an expanded group of MA degrees in psychology, including organizational development and depth psychology. He received an academic appointment in sociology, and taught classes on the civil rights movement, the environmental movement, and gender and social movements.

Walls authored The Activist's Almanac: The Concerned Citizen's Guide to the Leading Advocacy Organizations in America, interviewing over a hundred leaders of national social movement organizations. After a favorable review of The Activist's Almanac in The Workbook (a quarterly aimed at activists in the Southwest), editor Kathy Cone invited several articles by Walls. These appeared in The Workbook between 1994 and 2000, when the magazine was discontinued by its sponsor. Walls's survey article on community organizing has since been updated online.

In the early 2000s Walls engaged in a dispute with Project Censored over what he saw as a denial of war crimes committed by Serbs in Bosnia and Kosovo, specifically concerning atrocities at Trnopolje camp and Omarska camp near Prijedor in Bosnia, and the Račak massacre in Kosovo. Walls's article in New Politics drew a supportive letter from sociologist Bogdan Denitch and rejoinders from Peter Phillips, Diana Johnstone, and Edward S. Herman and David Peterson, with replies to each by Walls. He was also critical of Project Censored's occasional inability to distinguish between sound and unsound science, as in the case of NASA's Cassini-Huygens mission to Saturn and its promotion of 9/11 conspiracy theories.

Walls stepped down as dean in 2000, and taught part-time at SSU for four years, retiring as emeritus professor in 2005. He has since taught short courses on the sources of social movement success for the Osher Lifelong Learning Institutes (OLLI programs) at SSU and other northern California campuses.

== Selected publications ==
=== Appalachian studies ===
- David S. Walls and John B. Stephenson, eds., Appalachia in the Sixties: Decade of Reawakening (Lexington: University Press of Kentucky, 1972). ISBN 0-8131-0135-2
- "On the Naming of Appalachia", in An Appalachian Symposium, ed. J.W. Williamson (Boone, NC: Appalachian State University. Press, 1977), pp. 56–76.
- David S. Walls and Dwight B. Billings, "The Sociology of Southern Appalachia", Appalachian Journal, 5 (Autumn 1977), 131–144.
- "Internal Colony or Internal Periphery? A Critique of Current Models and an Alternative Formulation", in Colonialism in Modern America; The Appalachian Case, ed. Helen M. Lewis, Linda Johnson, and Don Askins (Boone, NC: Appalachian Consortium Press, 1978), pp. 319–349.
- David S. Walls, Dwight B. Billings, Mary P. Payne, and Joe F. Childers, Jr., "A Baseline Assessment of Coal Industry Structure in the Ohio River Basin Energy Study Region", 2 vol. (Urbana, IL: ORBES, June 1979). NTIS No. PB 82 103615.
- Dwight Billings and David Walls, "Appalachians," in Harvard Encyclopedia of American Ethnic Groups, ed. Stephan Thernstrom (Cambridge: Harvard University Press, 1980), pp. 125–128. ISBN 0-674-37512-2
- "Appalachia," in Encyclopedia of Appalachia, ed. Rudy Abramson and Jean Haskell (Knoxville: The University of Tennessee Press, 2006), pp. 1006–7. ISBN 1-57233-456-8
- "The Appalachian Volunteers in Perspective," review essay of Thomas Kiffmeyer, Reformers to Radicals:The Appalachian Volunteers and the War on Poverty, in Appalachian Journal, vol. 37, nos. 1–2 (Fall 2009/Winter 2010), pp. 100–105.

=== Social theory ===
- "Models of Poverty and Planned Change: A Framework for Synthesis", Journal of Sociology and Social Welfare, 5 (May 1978), 316–326.
- "Dialectical Social Science", in Theoretical Perspectives in Sociology, ed. Scott G. McNall (New York: St. Martins, 1979), pp. 214–231.

=== Social movements ===
- The Activist's Almanac: The Concerned Citizen's Guide to the Leading Advocacy Organizations in America (New York: Simon & Schuster/Fireside Books, 1993). ISBN 0-671-74634-0. Updated overviews of thirteen social movements, with annotated bibliographies are located at: David Walls - Sonoma State University - Biographical Sketch
- "Power to the People: Twenty Years of Community Organizing," in The Workbook, Vol. 19, No. 2 (Summer 1994), pp. 52–55. "Thirty-five Years" update: David Walls - Sonoma State University - Power to the People: Thirty-five Years of Community Organizing
- "Community Organizations," in Encyclopedia of the Consumer Movement, ed. Stephen Brobeck (Santa Barbara: ABC-CLIO, 1997), pp. 120–122. ISBN 0-87436-987-8
- "Marching Song of the First Arkansas Colored Regiment: A Contested Attribution", Arkansas Historical Quarterly, Winter 2007, pp. 401–421.
- Community Organizing: Fanning the Flame of Democracy (Polity Press, 2015), ISBN 978-0-7456-6320-3

=== Human rights ===
- "Dubious Sources: How Project Censored Joined the Whitewash of Serb Atrocities," New Politics, Vol. IX, No. 1 (New Series), Summer 2002, pp. 165–171.
- "Debate: Did Project Censored Whitewash Serbian Atrocities?" New Politics, Vol. IX, No. 2 (New Series), Winter 2003, pp. 88–100 (commentary and responses by Bogdan Denitch, Edward S. Herman and David Peterson, Diana Johnstone, and Peter Phillips, with replies by David Walls).
