= Eula Hall =

Health care clinic founder and community activist (1927–2021)

- Born: October 29, 1927; Pike County, Kentucky
- Died: May 8, 2021 (aged 93); Craynor, Kentucky
- Occupation: health care community activist
- Spouses: McKinley; Oliver Hall
- Children: 5
- Parents: Lee D. Riley; Elizabeth "Nanny" Riley

Eula Hall (October 29, 1927 – May 8, 2021) was an Appalachian activist and healthcare pioneer who founded the Mud Creek Clinic in Grethel in Floyd County, Kentucky.

== Biography ==
A self-described "hillbilly activist", Eula was born on October 29, 1927, the second of seven surviving children of Lee D. and Nanny Elizabeth Riley, tenant farmers living in Joe Boner Hollow near Greasy Creek, Kentucky. At the age of nine she attended Greasy Creek Elementary School in Pike County and graduated from the eighth grade in five years. The local high school, over 20 miles away, was too far away for her to continue her education.

She briefly worked in a World War II canning factory in Ontario, New York, at the age of fifteen, but was sent back to Kentucky on charges of 'inciting a labor riot' concerned with poor working conditions.

Upon returning to the mountains, she moved to Floyd County where she worked as a domestic servant for wealthy families who were boarding mine, oil and drilling workers. It was there she met her first husband, McKinley, a coal miner. They married when she was seventeen and together had five children. All were born at home: one was born premature and deaf, and another died in infancy.

During President Johnson's War on Poverty she joined the VISTA (Volunteers in Service to America) program and later became one of two local Appalachian Volunteers working in the area. She rose to prominence as an activist as a member of the local 979 community group and the Eastern Kentucky Welfare Rights Organization (EKWRO). She created the Mud Creek Water District and served as president of the Kentucky Black Lung Association.

In response to the failed OEO health program in Floyd County, in 1973, she established the Mud Creek Clinic in Grethel, Kentucky.

In 1977, she divorced her first husband and the next year married Oliver Hall, a retired miner.

A biography of Eula Hall, entitled Mud Creek Medicine: The Life of Eula Hall and the Fight for Appalachia, was written by Kiran Bhatraju and published by Butler Books on November 15, 2013.

Hall died on May 8, 2021, at the age of 93.

== Mud Creek Clinic ==
In 1973, Hall opened the doors to The Mud Creek Clinic in Mud Creek, Kentucky, for the uninsured and the under-insured. The clinic was part of the nationwide community health movement, as conceived by the Medical Committee for Human Rights (MCHR). Hall attended one of the early MCHR meetings in 1971, where she met Elinor Graham, one of the first doctors at the Mud Creek Clinic. In the same year, Hall connected with medical students through the Student Health Coalition and organized a one-week health fair in Floyd County, when medical students examined around five-hundred patients. In the summer of 1972, the EKWRO Health Committee began a summer health project that helped lay the groundwork for the future clinic. With a $1,400 donation by the Appalachian Volunteers and the commitment of two local doctors who volunteered from Our Lady of the Way hospital in Martin, Kentucky, the clinic began in a rented trailer on Tinker Fork. It soon outgrew the facility and Hall decided to move her own family into a two-bedroom mobile home and use her own house as the new location for the clinic. She converted the three bedrooms into six exam rooms and the rest of the house into waiting rooms and offices. At the time, the clinic didn't have its own pharmacy and medications had to be delivered from the local hospital after the clinic had closed. Hall would spend half the night delivering medication to patients who had been at the clinic that day.

By 1977, the patient population was so great that Mud Creek Clinic was struggling to meet the needs of the community. Patients often came from as far as Tennessee, West Virginia, and Ohio to get medical care. Mud Creek Clinic then joined forces with Big Sandy Health Care, Inc. (BSHC) a local nonprofit health care organization that operated another community clinic in neighboring Magoffin County. This merger allowed Mud Creek to receive some federal funding and widen its patient care. After the merger, Hall stayed on as a patient advocate for the Mud Creek Clinic and continued to work in that capacity.

=== Clinic rebuilt following arson ===
In 1982, Hall and the Mud Creek community suffered a great loss when the clinic burned down at the hand of a mysterious arsonist. The next morning Hall and the clinic doctor pulled a picnic table under a willow tree and treated patients who had scheduled appointments. She had the telephone company place a telephone on the tree so that patients could call the clinic. Hall then had two used trailers joined to use as a temporary clinic. A few months after the fire, Hall received a letter from the Appalachian Regional Commission (ARC) stating that they would donate funds for a new facility for Mud Creek Clinic. One of the conditions of the funding was that the community would be required to provide $80,000 in matching funds. She called a public meeting and more than 400 people showed up and pledged their support. People gave money and items to be raffled off at auction, Hall organized a two-day radiothon that raised $17,000 and multiple chicken-and-dumpling dinners that earned $1,300 apiece. With Eula's leadership, the community raised $120,000 - $40,000 more than the necessary $80,000 required by the ARC. The extra money paid for new X-ray equipment for the clinic.

The new clinic opened its doors in 1984 as a modern 5,200 square feet (480 m^{2}) brick building. It is still the home of the clinic today. The clinic houses its own laboratory, X-ray machines, and pharmacy. The clinic has expanded to include an adjacent 1,800 square feet (170 m^{2}) building that houses a dental clinic, clothing room, and a food pantry that serves more than 100 families per month.

=== Current operations ===
The Mud Creek Clinic had more than 213,000 patient encounters last year and no one is ever turned away.

As social director, Hall counseled patients on disability claims and Social Security benefits, arranged financial aid for food and drugs, answered questions about food stamps and housing opportunities, and attended civic board meetings and hearings. When patients can't afford lawyers, she often represented them in court. She won approximately four percent of her cases.

== Awards and recognition ==
Hall has received numerous awards for her advocacy work, including honorary doctorates from Berea College - Berea, Kentucky; Midway College - Midway, Kentucky; Pikeville College - Pikeville, Kentucky and Trinity College - Hartford, Connecticut. She was honored at Berea College alongside the Nobel Peace Prize winner Archbishop Desmond Tutu.

In 2004, the Appalachian Ministries Educational Resource Center presented Hall with the Annual David S. Shuller Spirit of AMERC Award. She has received personal letters from President George Bush, Senator Mitch McConnell, and Representative Hal Rogers, among other notables who have recognized the amazing work and the ongoing effort Hall has devoted to the health and well-being of eastern Kentucky.

Highway 979, which runs through the Mud Creek area, was named the Eula Hall Highway in her honor during October 2006.

Big Sandy Healthcare also has started two funds in tribute to Hall. The Eula Hall Patient Assistance Fund will cover healthcare costs for uninsured and indigent patients and the Eula Hall Scholarship Fund will provide financial assistance for area students pursuing careers in healthcare or social services.

The clinic has been visited by former President Bill Clinton, Senator Edward Kennedy, Reverend Jesse Jackson, and John Edwards.

== Resources ==
- Kersey, Cynthia (1998). "The Power of the Creative Spirit: Moving Mountains in the Appalachians, Eula Hall, Founder of Mud Creek Clinic". Unstoppable: 45 Powerful Stories of Perseverance and Triumph from People Just Like You. Naperville, IL: Sourcebooks, Inc. pp. 250–254. ISBN 1-57071-338-3.
- Hall, Eula (2001). "If there's one thing you can tell them, it's that you're free". In Billings, Dwight B.; et al. (eds.). Back talk from Appalachia: Confronting Stereotypes. Lexington: University Press of Kentucky. ISBN 0-8131-9001-0.
- Appalshop, Inc (1983). Five conversations about violence (video, 29 min.). Whitesburg, KY: Appalshop, Inc.. Eula Hall, director of Mud Creek Clinic, is one of the five people from eastern Kentucky interviewed by Appalshop to give their ideas about the causes of violence and offer possible solutions.
