= Appalachian Volunteers =

- Founded: 1964
- Dissolved: 1970
- Purpose: Community organization
- Region served: Central Appalachia
- Method: Organizing, community development

Appalachian Volunteers (AV) was a non-profit organization engaged in community development projects in central Appalachia that evolved into a controversial community organizing network, with a reputation that went "from self-help to sedition" as its staff developed from "reformers to radicals," teaching things from Marx, Lenin and Mao, in the words of one historian, in the brief period between 1964 and 1970 during the War on Poverty.

== Origins ==
The Appalachian Volunteers (AV) began as an activity of the Council of the Southern Mountains (CSM), which had been headquartered in Berea, Kentucky, since 1925. Following President Lyndon Johnson's State of the Union message of January 8, 1964, in which he announced his war on poverty, CSM staff member Milton Ogle organized a group of students from Berea College to help repair a one-room school in Harlan County, Kentucky. During the following two months, students from other eastern Kentucky colleges were involved in similar weekend projects. A meeting was held at the Pine Mountain Settlement School in Harlan County to formally organize the Appalachian Volunteers to expand such efforts. Representatives of the Kentucky Governor's office, the President's Appalachian Regional Commission, and the President's Committee for a war on poverty were present to encourage college and school officials and to promise federal support. A $50,000 grant from the federal Area Redevelopment Administration to the CSM was arranged in March 1964 to fund AV activities during the rest of the year.

== Program expansion ==
During 1964 the AV continued to expand the number of colleges involved in school renovation, cultural enrichment, and recreation programs for children in one and two room schools. A prototype summer project was tested by an AV staff member and three students, who spent eight weeks in Clay County, Kentucky, providing recreation and remedial work for the children in a remote hollow. A "Books for Appalachia" campaign, which collected over a million volumes, was begun in cooperation with the National Parent-Teacher Association.

Following the establishment of the Office of Economic Opportunity (OEO) in fall 1964, the AV applied for a Community Action Program demonstration grant, and was awarded $300,000 in December to expand its program in 1965. The following spring the AV negotiated a $40,000 training grant with VISTA. The new funding allowed Ogle to hire staff, including Gibbs Kinderman, a recent Harvard graduate who had taken part in the Freedom Summer project in Mississippi in 1964. Also in spring 1965 the AVs received a $139,000 community action demonstration grant to support 150 college students for an eight-week summer project in eastern Kentucky. Half the students were recruited from the Kentucky colleges with active AV chapters, and the other half were recruited from colleges and universities in such major cities as Boston, Chicago and New York.

== Break with the Council of the Southern Mountains ==
As the AV students and staff became more deeply involved in poor rural communities, they began to see local politicians and school leaders as part of the problem rather than allies in uplift. The AV began to move from a consensus to a conflict understanding of how social change takes place. In 1966 tensions between the AV and the CSM came to a head when CSM executive director Perley Ayer, who was committed to a nonpolitical, consensus vision of community development, fired AV director Ogle and his assistant director. The remaining 13 AV staff resigned. They quickly moved to incorporate as a separate organization, and OEO promptly transferred its grants to the newly independent AV. To emphasize its separation from the CSM, the AV moved its headquarters from Berea, Kentucky, to Bristol, Tennessee, a location more central to the southern Appalachians into which the AV hoped to expand.

With its new funding the AV greatly expanded its summer program in 1966, placing 500 students with eight-week projects in four states: eastern Kentucky, southern West Virginia, southwestern Virginia, and eastern Tennessee. OEO was becoming unhappy with the failure of many community action agencies (CAAs) in central Appalachia to take seriously its mandate of "maximum feasible participation" of the poor in the administration of the CAAs. OEO encouraged the AV to rally the rural poor for a bigger role in the local CAAs. Conflict in Kentucky's Cumberland Valley was acute, and led to a controversial defunding of its eight-county CAA, which was split into one- and two-county agencies.

== Strip-mining and the sedition controversy ==
As the summer of 1967 approached, the AV made plans for 400 students in three states, (pulling back from a small project in eastern Tennessee). During the previous winter, field coordinator Steve Daugherty became concerned about a landslide from a strip-mine bench that threatened a house at the head of Jones Creek, above Verda on the Clover Fork of the Cumberland River in Harlan County. Daugherty contacted the original Knott County members of the Appalachian Group to Save the Land and People (AGSLP) that had generated widespread publicity when the Widow Combs resisted strip-mine operators, and 80-year-old Dan Gibson threatened the bulldozers with his rifle in 1965. Daugherty helped organize an AGSLP chapter in Harlan County, and encouraged Joe Mulloy, AV field coordinator in Pike County, Kentucky to do the same, as conflict over strip-mining was developing on Island Creek, where Jink Ray was planning to block bulldozers from his land. Mulloy was joined by local activist Edith Easterling, an AV intern and one of several local Kentucky women who became involved in the AV and were fundamental to organizing communities. The stand-off gained statewide publicity, and ended only when Governor Edward T. Breathitt flew to Island Creek in July to see for himself and suspend the coal operator's permit, and on August 1 revoked the permit to strip-mine Ray's property.

On the evening of August 11, 1967, as the AV summer volunteer program was winding down, the Pike County sheriff raided the homes of AV Joe Mulloy and his wife Karen (an AV Vista volunteer) and Alan and Margaret McSurely, who were then working for the Southern Conference Education Fund (SCEF), and confiscated a large quantity of the McSurelys' personal papers and books. (Alan had worked briefly for the AV that spring). Books that supposedly demonstrated their seditious nature included "a large number of works about Communism, including a couple dozen by Marx, Engels, and Lenin," as well as copies of Joseph Heller's novel, Catch-22, and Mao's Red Book. Joe Mulloy and the McSurelys were charged with sedition ("plotting the violent overthrow of Pike County, Kentucky") by Pike County Commonwealth Attorney Thomas Ratliff, who was a Republican candidate for lieutenant governor and president of the Independent Coal Operators Association. SCEF's controversial leaders, Anne and Carl Braden, were also charged, although they resided in Louisville. Three days later federal appeals court judge Bert T. Combs (a former Kentucky governor) declared Kentucky's sedition statute unconstitutional and dismissed the charges.

Although the sedition charges were thrown out of court, the case continued to haunt the AV. The group's opponents were encouraged to go on the attack in hope of cutting off OEO funding. For their part, the McSurelys spent eighteen years in various courts, first to get back their personal papers and books, and then suing for financial damages various individuals who had held them illegally, with only limited success. The AV had supported Joe Mulloy when he was charged with sedition, but later that fall when he announced he would resist being drafted to fight in Vietnam, most of the local AV staff opposed having to defend his position. After bitter discussion and argument, the full staff voted 20 to 19 to fire Mulloy, who then went to work for SCEF.

== Governor Nunn and KUAC ==
Congressional leaders were becoming concerned by the controversies generated by OEO's community action programs across the country, and in 1967 Oregon Representative Edith Green authored an amendment to the Economic Opportunity Act, attached to an appropriation bill, which assured that local political officials would have more influence on CAAs. Knowing its OEO funding was threatened, the AV retrenched and attempted to focus its scattered projects. Needing a more central location for its downscaled programs, now limited to eastern Kentucky and southern West Virginia, the AV moved its central office from Bristol, Tennessee to Prestonsburg, Kentucky in March 1968. In July, Milton Ogle announced that he would resign from his position as executive director of the AV in September. Assistant director David Walls was appointed acting director, and was later confirmed as executive director for the organization's final year.

Adding to the AV's troubles, Louie B. Nunn had been elected governor of Kentucky in November 1967 (the only Republican governor of Kentucky between 1943 and 2003). He moved quickly to support legislation creating the Kentucky Un-American Activities Committee (KUAC), which passed in March 1968. Once KUAC had held hearings on the civil disorders in Louisville, governor Nunn honored his political debts to the independent coal operators by supporting the dispatch of KUAC to Pikeville to investigate alleged "subversive" activities in anti-poverty programs and at Pikeville College. One focus of the hearing was the AV's work for reduced tap-on fees for poor people to a proposed water system along Marrowbone Creek. Walls issued a statement challenging the constitutionality of KUAC and the legality of the hearings, noting the topic of the water system would be better suited for a public utilities commission. The AV senior staff refused invitations to appear, but were not issued subpoenas, which they had hoped to challenge in court. Local AV staff who were subpoenaed, including Edith Easterling, appeared and denounced KUAC and its local political and coal operator allies.

Although the KUAC hearings caused serious difficulties for the AV, the most immediate casualty was Thomas Johns, the liberal president of Pikeville College, who faced what was most likely the only conservative student revolt in the United States in 1968. He resigned not long after.

== AV in West Virginia ==
The AV sent staff to West Virginia in 1966 to prepare for the expanded program of summer volunteers. Unconstrained by the earlier history of one-room schoolhouse service projects in Kentucky, the West Virginia staff moved immediately into the contention over poor people's representation on the county community action agencies. Their greatest success came in Raleigh County, where insurgent groups gained control of the CAA board and named Gibbs Kinderman executive director. In 1968 the AV staff helped form the Fair Elections Committee in Mingo County where voter fraud was rampant, and also supported the Political Action League in Raleigh, Mingo and Wyoming Counties, which ran a slate of reform candidates.

Governor Hulett C. Smith had requested that OEO cease funding the AV, and OEO was not persuaded to continue its program grants. Walls announced that support for AV activity in West Virginia would end on January 1, 1969. Kinderman and Tom Rhodenbaugh formed Designs for Rural Action, which supported the Black Lung Association and the Miners for Democracy movements which helped Arnold Miller become the reform president of the United Mine Workers of America following the murder of Joseph Yablonski. The AV also helped start the legal services group Appalachian Research and Defense Fund (Appalred). Milton Ogle moved to Charleston, West Virginia, and after a year's sabbatical went to work for Appalred. Kinderman became director of the Mountaineer Family Health Plan in Raleigh County. Bill Schechter worked for the successful campaign of Jay Rockefeller, who ran for West Virginia secretary of state in 1968. Schechter and Bruce Boyens later worked for the UMWA in West Virginia. AV staff Tom Bethell, Tom Rhodenbaugh, and Dave Biesmeyer went to work for Arnold Miller's reform team in the UMWA national office in Washington, DC.

== Decline and demise ==
By 1969 the AV was operating on the unexpended funds from previous grants, under extensions from OEO. Despite the endorsement of influential liberals like Robert Coles and a favorable review by the OEO regional office, no more OEO grants were forthcoming. Walls continued to seek private foundation funds, but none were obtained beyond modest support for an orderly close-out. Federal funding for the AV was over, and working part-time, Walls attempted to downsize in a fashion that could successfully spin off legal services to Appalred, the Grassroots Craftsmen co-op to the Commission on Religion in Appalachia (CORA) under Ben Poage, and welfare rights activities to local groups. He also transferred some of the last AV funds to the Mud Creek Clinic, organized by activist Eula Hall. Walls resigned as director at the end of April 1970 to devote full-time to graduate studies at the University of Kentucky, and the AV closed its doors later that year.

== Reunion ==
A reunion of former AVs was held in Richmond, Kentucky, March 11–13, 2011, in conjunction with the 34th annual conference of the Appalachian Studies Association.

== Archives ==
The archives of the AV were donated to the Weatherford-Hammond Mountain Collection of the Hutchins Library at Berea College in 1969. It consists of 146 boxes of correspondence, records, government grants, reports, newspaper clippings, photographs, slides, film, and sound recordings.

== See also ==
- Before the Mountain Was Moved
