= Dingman =

Dingman is a surname. Notable people with the surname include:

- Chris Dingman (born 1976), Canadian ice hockey player
- Craig Dingman (born 1974), American baseball player
- Dean Dingman (born 1968), American football offensive guard
- Helen Dingman (1885–1978), American academic and social worker
- Ian Dingman (born 1982), American lacrosse player
- Mary Dingman (1875–1961), American social and peace activist
- Maurice John Dingman (1914–1992), American Roman Catholic bishop
- Michael D. Dingman (1931–2017), American investor, businessman, and philanthropist

== See also ==
- Dingman Township, Pike County, Pennsylvania
