= Loyal Jones =

Appalachian culture scholar and writer (1928–2023)

Loyal Jones (January 5, 1928 – October 7, 2023) was an American folklorist, Appalachian culture scholar, and writer.

== Biography ==
Loyal Jones was born in Marble, North Carolina, on January 5, 1928, one of eight siblings in a farming family. At the age of 12, his family moved to Brasstown, North Carolina, in proximity to the John C. Campbell Folk School established in 1925. After completing high school, he served in the U.S. Navy towards the end of World War II.

Jones pursued higher education upon recommendation from an individual associated with the folk school. Jones earned his B.A. in English from Berea College and an M.A. from the University of North Carolina. Before joining Berea College as a faculty member, he taught in the U.S. Army and at Jefferson County Public Schools.

Jones began working at the Council of the Southern Mountains in 1958 and served as the organization's executive director from 1967 until 1970. From 1970 to 1993, Jones directed Berea College's Appalachian Center. He was considered the "father of modern Appalachian studies". Jones also led the Celebration of Traditional Music at Berea from 1973 to 1993. In 2008, the center was named the Loyal Jones Appalachian Center after him. Jones was inducted into the Kentucky Writers Hall of Fame in 2022.

Loyal Jones was married to Nancy Swan with whom he had three children.

Loyal Jones died in Black Mountain, North Carolina, on October 7, 2023, at the age of 95.

== Bibliography ==
- Appalachia: A Self-Portrait (1979)
- Radio's 'Kentucky Mountain Boy' Bradley Kincaid (1980)
- Minstrel of the Appalachians: The Story of Bascom Lamar Lunsford (1984)
- Reshaping the Image of Appalachia (1986)
- Appalachian Values (1995)
- Faith and Meaning in the Southern Uplands (1999)
- Country Music Humorists and Comedians (2008)
- My Curious and Jocular Heroes: Tales and Tale-Spinners from Appalachia (2017)
