= Mountain Maternal Health League =

The Mountain Maternal Health League (MMHL) was established in 1936 to provide contraception to women living in rural Appalachian Kentucky.

== League formation and early history ==
In the spring of 1936, an agent working for Clarence Gamble met with social workers and activists from Berea, KY at the Conference of Southern Mountain Workers. Gamble had funded birth control projects through the United States in an effort to discover the effectiveness rate of inexpensive contraceptive methods among rural populations. Activists in Berea decided to form a league with funding from Gamble. Using Gamble's work in Logan, West Virginia as a model, Gamble agreed to provide a vehicle, a salary for a nurse, and contraceptive supplies for the league to operate. The league was initially called the Kentucky Maternal Health League and they hired Lena Gilliam as their first nurse.

Lena Gilliam was from Rockcastle County, Kentucky and league members felt that her familiarity with rural populations would aid in approaching patients and communicating contraceptive information. During the 1930s, a number of clinics has opened across the United States as national organizations such as the American Birth Control League and Birth Control Clinical Research Bureau as well as activists like Margaret Sanger promoted the expansion of birth control services. Since the service area around Berea was rural and isolated, the Kentucky Maternal Health League decided against using a typical clinic-based operation. Using the Gamble-financed vehicle, Gilliam would travel to clients in rural areas and visit them in their homes.

Gilliam would visit the homes and conduct interviews and evaluations with potential clients. If they were interested in contraceptives, Gilliam would answer questions regarding the contraceptive jelly and nozzles she would distribute. Because Gamble wanted to test low-cost contraceptives and their effectiveness in rural populations, the diaphragm was deemed too expensive to distribute. In addition, diaphragms had to be fitted and required frequent follow up visits - a difficult task for rural women due to transportation difficulties. Kentucky Maternal Health clients paid for the supplies if able and additional supplies were sent to a central location where they could pick them up. During this time, the league distributed contraceptive supplies to Appalachian doctors for distribution among their patients and they began coordinating clinic locations in Harlan, KY and Sevierville, TN.

In 1938, satisfied with the results of his study, Gamble began to withdraw his funding. Final results of his tests showed the contraceptive jelly method to be 85% effective. Also in 1938, Lena Gilliam married and left her work with the league. These events would lead to changes within the league which had changed its name to the Mountain Maternal Health League in 1937.

== 1940s–1950s ==
By 1939, Louise Gilman Hutchins had joined the Mountain Maternal Health League and continued to influence it throughout its history. She would serve as medical director and board president for the league for 47 years.

Other changes to the Mountain Maternal organization occurred during this period. After Lena Gilliam left her position as the league nurse, Sylvia Gilliam, her sister, took up the role. In 1940, S. Gilliam conducted more work for Mountain Maternal's branch clinic in Harlan, KY as well as working outside of the state. During 1940, she received a request from the Michigan Maternal Health League. Newly arrived migrant workers in Michigan were seen as a population in need of contraceptive methods and the Michigan league requested that Gilliam institute these measures. Gilliam traveled to Michigan in July and August 1941 to conduct this work. Soon after, Sylvia would leave the MMHL to work with Gamble in Watauga County, North Carolina.

During this period, the work of the Mountain Maternal expanded into new areas of Kentucky as well. A new nurse hired in 1943 began to conduct a clinic amongst African American populations in Richmond, KY. In 1944, Hutchins was instrumental in the establishment of a hospital based clinic in Berea, Kentucky at what was then the Berea College Hospital. Volunteer physicians saw patients who traveled across county lines from rural communities to attend the clinic.

In 1945, the Mountain Maternal would affiliate with the Planned Parenthood Federation of America. It was also during this year that they associated with the Frontier Nursing Service by supporting three graduate nurse midwives in Knott and Knox County, Kentucky.

New services were created and others expanded in 1947 when a new nurse, Gretchen James began work in Garrard, Estill, Jackson, Breathitt Counties.

== 1960s to 2006 ==
Throughout the 1960s, the League expanded their services and fulfilled their goals of incorporating contraception into public health programs. In 1960, under the leadership of Hutchins, the League purchased foaming contraceptive tablets to distribute to rural women without access to plumbing. Soon after, Hutchins convinced the Madison County Board of Health to allow county nurses to distribute those tablets to patients. In 1961, ten more counties were persuaded to provide tablets through their county Health Department nurses.

1962 was a successful year for the League. The State Health Commissioner wrote letters authorizing state Health Departments to include family planning in their work.

Throughout the 1960s, the League continued to expand services. They conducted a birth control pill trial with Mead Johnson in 1963 and were able to distribute supplies to 403 women. The League continued to expand their services by beginning to offer intrauterine devices to women in the 1970s. By this time, the number of patients being served by Mountain Maternal was in the thousands. In 2006, the organization closed due to lack of funding.

== See also ==
- Birth control movement in the United States
