= Cheryl Nixon =

American university administrator and literary scholar

10th President of Berea College
- In office July 1, 2023 – Present
- Preceded by: Lyle Roelofs

Personal details
- Education: Tufts University (BA); Harvard University (MA, PhD)

Cheryl L. Nixon is the 10th president of Berea College in Berea, Kentucky. She is the first woman to serve in this role. Nixon most recently served as Provost and Vice President for Academic Affairs at Fort Lewis College, and Associate Provost at the University of Massachusetts Boston. She has a B.A. degree in English and Political Science from Tufts University and a M.A. and Ph.D. in English from Harvard University.
