= Student Health Coalition =

American healthcare organization

- Successor: Vanderbilt University Center for Health Services
- Formation: 1969
- Founder: Bill Dow
- Founded at: Vanderbilt University
- Type: Nonprofit organization
- Purpose: Health care services, community organizing
- Region served: Appalachia
- Subsidiaries: East Tennessee Research Corporation (1973–78); Coal Employment Program (1978–97); Statewide Organizing for Community eMpowerment (1972–)

The Student Health Coalition (SHC), also known as the Appalachian Student Health Coalition, was an organization founded at Vanderbilt University in 1969 to provide health care to low-income, medically underserved communities in Appalachia, particularly East Tennessee, and later expanded to communities in Nashville and West Tennessee.

As students realized the scope of the problems of the people they served, the effort expanded into providing legal assistance, community organizing, and changing public policies at the county, state, and federal level. The goal of the SHC in the communities with which it worked was to organize community health councils, which could then raise funds to build and staff their own local health clinics.

== Background ==
The organization was founded in 1969 by Bill Dow, then a medical student at Vanderbilt University, with the assistance of the former chairman of pediatrics, Amos Christie and a grant from the Josiah Macy Jr. Foundation. After a year spent visiting a number of communities and speaking with local leaders, in the summer of 1970 six East Tennessee communities invited the SHC to visit and provide health fair screening services. The Tennessee Valley Authority (TVA) donated use of their screening vans and personnel to run them.

Two students were assigned to each community as organizers; their goal was to organize a group of local leaders to form a health council. The students were assigned to live with local families during the week-long health fair, which consisted of providing health screening services. Local churches were asked to participate by preparing lunches for the health fair students. After the health fair was over, community organizers were responsible for finding follow-up care for patients, and assisting the health councils in obtaining funding and resources for local clinics.

Health fairs were set up at either local elementary schools or community centers. The health fair workers included medical students and nursing students who were trained by physicians. Nursing students were trained as physical examiners in an early demonstration of the expanding role of nurses, as the first nurse practitioner program had begun just four years earlier by Loretta Ford and Henry Silver at the University of Colorado.

== Expansion ==
Over subsequent years, the SHC program was expanded in size and scope, as it became clear to the students that improved health care could not be achieved without addressing legal, environmental and economic issues. To foster further development, the Center for Health Services was created at Vanderbilt University to provide an umbrella of support for the various student projects.

Students from many other universities came to work with the SHC, including from Brown, Johns Hopkins, Columbia, Berea College and others. The Vanderbilt Center for Health Services provided support for multiple projects over its 40-year existence, including continuing projects in East Tennessee; and new health care organizing efforts in West Tennessee and Nashville; maternal and infant care programs.

Two Vanderbilt law students started the East Tennessee Research Corporation (ETRC), which operated from 1973–1978. The ETRC provided legal assistance to health councils in navigating health care laws, partnered with Save Our Cumberland Mountains to reduce local environmental damage from coal mining, and monitored the Tennessee Valley Authority, a major coal consumer and political force in the region. The ETRC challenged the appointment of unqualified candidates to the TVA board. It also lobbied the TVA to introduce a “lifeline” rate for low-income customers, and pursued legal action on overweight coal trucks that damaged roads. ETRC lawyer and TVA critic Neil McBride ended up serving on the TVA Board of Directors from 2010 to 2013.

The ETRC spawned the Coal Employment Program (CEP), which existed from 1978 to 1997. The CEP fought gender discrimination in the coal mining industry, filing legal complaints against numerous coal companies and mines. The companies were charged with violating the Civil Rights Act of 1964, which prohibited discriminating on the basis of gender when hiring for companies with federal contracts (most major coal companies had federal contracts).

Save Our Cumberland Mountains (SOCM) was founded in 1972 after research done by SHC students demonstrated a major failure of large absentee land corporations to pay taxes on their coal-bearing land. Joining with local leaders, a settlement was reached. For 36 years SOCM fought to control unregulated and unlicensed strip mining, destruction of mountain roads by overloaded coal trucks, and loss of tax revenue. In 2008 the organization expanded statewide and changed its name to Statewide Organizing for Community eMpowerment.

== Legacy ==
The SHC led directly to the 1972 creation of the student-run Center for Health Services (CHS) at Vanderbilt University. In the mid-1990s, the SHC was absorbed by the CHS. The formal Student Health Coalition designation for projects thus ended. The CHS changed its name to the Vanderbilt Center for Community Health Solutions in 2011–2012. The Vanderbilt Center for Community Health Solutions ceased operations in 2013. At least one of its programs, the Maternal Infant Health Outreach Worker (MIHOW) Program, was moved to the Vanderbilt School of Nursing in 2013.

A number of individual clinics that were organized by the SHC were unable to recruit full-time physicians because of a small population base and inadequate funding; thus they joined together to form clinic groups that could share resources and clinical providers. Three clinic groups that were initially organized in the mid-1970s are still functioning today, although all in different forms than when they opened:

- Dayspring Family Health Center (originally known as United Health Services, and later as the Laurel Fork-Clear Fork Health Centers, Inc.)
- Mountain People's Health Councils, Inc. was formed in 1974 and composed of three clinics (Petros, Tennessee; Stoney Fork, Tennessee; and Norma, Tennessee). Through the National Health Service Corps, former SHC medical students provided care as full-time physicians for more than six years. Over the years, Mountain People's Health Councils became primarily located in Scott County, Tennessee.
- The St. Charles (VA) Clinic was organized by the community following an SHC health fair in 1975. By 1976 the clinic had opened to the public, staffed by a Vanderbilt-trained physician (Wayne A. Van Zee) who remains the primary physician at that clinic. This group provides primary care to 20,000 people in rural southwestern Virginia.

The local clinics were created directly through the efforts of community leaders and health councils in each community. Without their work these clinics never would have been established.

== Archive ==
After the death of Bill Dow in 2012, former SHC members began to collect materials related to the early and ongoing efforts of the SHC. The Southern Historical Collection at the University of North Carolina agreed to provide support for a community-driven archive. The archive includes a timeline of the projects, video clips from the 1970s, and stories from the participants. Associated with the archive are a collection of papers belonging to Bill Dow and a collection of photographs taken by Richard Davidson. Another collection includes a variety of documents and photographs submitted by former members.
