= Louise Gilman Hutchins =

- Born: February 2, 1911; Changsha, China
- Died: 1996 (aged 84–85); Berea, Kentucky
- Known for: Served as President and Board Director for the Mountain Maternal Health League
- Spouse: Francis Stephenson Hutchins
- Medical career
- Profession: Pediatrician, obstetrician

Louise Gilman Hutchins (1911–1996) was president and board director for the Mountain Maternal Health League in Berea, Kentucky for 47 years.

== Family and early life ==
Louise Gilman Hutchins was born February 2, 1911, to Episcopal missionaries in Changsha, Hunan Province, China. The family lived there until 1926, when they returned to the United States, moving to New Jersey. During her time in Changsha, China, Louise would meet Francis Hutchins and the two married in 1934.

In 1932, Hutchins graduated from Wellesley College and in 1936, earned her M.D. in pediatrics and obstetrics from Yale University. Following her graduation from Yale, Dr. Hutchins returned to China to work with her new husband, Francis, who had been engaged in aid work in the region since meeting Louise years earlier. In Changsha, she completed an internship in pediatrics at the Hunan Hospital. Her internship did not last long, as in 1937 Japan invaded China. Louise and her family were forced to evacuate Changsha when the Japanese advanced and destroyed the city. At one point, Louise and her daughter Anne were separated from Francis, but she eventually made it to Shanghai. At this time, Shanghai was considered a safe place by foreigners because there was a lot of foreign military support there. In 1939, Francis Hutchins was offered the presidency of Berea College and after initial reluctance, the couple left China for Kentucky.

== Mountain Maternal Health League ==
In Berea, Hutchins served as the only pediatrician in the community from 1939 to 1967. Soon after her arrival in the community, Hutchins became the board president and medical director for the Mountain Maternal Health League and continued in that role for 47 years. The Mountain Maternal Health League, established in 1936, served rural women in Estill, Harlan, Garrard, Jackson, Lincoln, Madison, Powell, Rockcastle, and Whitley counties. The League offered medical services to women in these communities by traveling to reach geographically isolated patients. Most of their work, however, involved providing contraception information in their clinic while providing refills on contraceptive supplies via mail. During this time, Kentucky law prohibited government officials from funding or disseminating birth control information.

In 1944, the Mountain Maternal Health League established a clinic in Berea Hospital and soon after, became affiliated with Planned Parenthood Federation of America. At some point during her time in Berea, she received an honorary degree from Berea College. In 1967, Francis Hutchins retired from Berea College and the couple moved to Hong Kong for three years. During this time, Louise Hutchins completed a residency in gynecology while working with the city's Family Planning Association. After her residency, Louise returned to Berea with her husband in 1970 and continued her work with women's and children's health. She also continued to look for ways to improve family planning in Berea. This task brought her back to China in 1978, where she spent a month traveling to different hospitals to meet with local doctors. She brought back what she learned and worked to improve women's health and family planning. She died in Berea in 1996 at the age of 85.

== Legacy ==
In 1998, two years after the death of Louise Hutchins, Berea College opened the International Center for students to study abroad. The name remained unchanged until 2006 when it was changed to the Francis and Louise Hutchins Center for International Education(CIE). The college decided to dedicate the center to the Hutchins in November 2006 as a way to recognize their work in China.

== See also ==
- Birth control movement in the United States
