= Helen Dingman =

American academic and social worker

- photograph from the collections of Berea College
- Born: Helen Hastie Dingman; February 5, 1885; Spring Valley, Rockland County, New York
- Died: April 22, 1978 (aged 93); Berea, Kentucky
- Other name: Helen H. Dingman
- Occupations: academic, social worker
- Years active: 1914-1952

Helen Dingman (February 5, 1885 – April 22, 1978) was an American academic and social worker who was one of the central figures in the Progressive and New Deal eras to bring social and economic reform to Appalachia. After teaching in Massachusetts for five years from 1912 to 1917, Dingman moved to Kentucky to establish the Smith Community Life School under the auspices of the United Presbyterian Church. Serving as principal and directing six other schools in Harlan County, Kentucky, she provided both education and social services to the community until 1922. After a two-year placement as an assistant superintendent for the mission board in New York, she was hired as a teacher in the Sociology Department at Berea College. She taught social work courses and trained teachers for the rural schools in the region until 1952. In addition, she served as Executive Secretary of the Conference of Southern Mountain Workers, establishing the professional basis for social workers. The first comprehensive economic and social survey of the Southern Appalachias was spearheaded by Dingman.

== Early life ==
Helen Hastie Dingman was born on February 5, 1885, in Spring Valley, Rockland County, New York, to Nettie Clyde (née Beveridge) and James Alva Dingman. She was the fifth child among ten siblings and was strongly influenced by her father and oldest sibling, Mary's ideas of social responsibility. James, originally from Canada, was a physician and a devout Methodist, who encouraged his children toward humanitarian service, while Mary, a specialist on working conditions for women, would become one of the most-known peace activists in the Inter-War Era.

== Career ==
In 1912, Dingman began her career as a teacher, as her sister had done, at Dana Hall School in Wellesley, Massachusetts, working as an assistant teacher in the art department and teaching Latin. She was interested in reform work and began working for the Presbyterian Board of Home Missions. In 1916, she had an introduction to Appalachia, when she participated in a summer program in Rocky Fork, Tennessee. After the fall term in 1917, she left Dana Hall and moved to Harlan County, Kentucky. She settled in Smith and established a headquarters there for mission work throughout the county. In 1918, she directed the construction of a community center to house social workers and began work at the Smith Community Life School. The school was founded on the principal that the community should direct the development to meet their own needs. While she directed the community center, established nursing care and teaching, and planned a cooperative store, among other community services, she believed that community involvement was essential for sustaining the projects. Acting as principal until 1922, Dingman supervised the school, as well as six other county schools under the sponsorship of the United Presbyterian Church. She was also the leader of a group of temperance women who successfully organized against moonshining in the county.

Dingman returned to New York as the assistant superintendent for the fieldwork of the Mission Board in 1922 and remained for two years, before being recruited to return to Kentucky to teach. In 1924, William J. Hutchins, president of Berea College offered Dingman an appointment as a sociology teacher and trainer for teachers in rural schools. These rural schools, known as Opportunity Schools focused on community involvement, giving students an education, developing community improvement projects and offering adult education exchanges. She instructed her students in providing social services in addition to education, including practical skills like community organization, health and sanitation programs, family counseling, as well as how to build and repair their school facilities.

In 1926, Dingman became the editor of Mountain Life and Work, a journal published by Berea College, which shared progressive reform work being done for the underprivileged mountain communities of Appalachia. Two years later, she became the Executive Secretary of the Conference of Southern Mountain Workers (CSMW), taking over from Olive Dame Campbell, who had managed the CSMW since her husband, John C. Campbell’s death. The CSMW was a professional organization of Progressive Era reformers, designed to allow social workers to meet and share strategies for improvements in the area. From her appointment as Executive Secretary the journal, Mountain Life, became the official publication of the CSMW. During the Great Depression, under Dingman's leadership, the CSMW expanded programs to include recreational activates to offset the stark realities of life. Many of the programs initiated aimed at preserving folk traditions, such as dancing, handicrafts, and music, of mountain people. One of Dingman's most successful ventures was creating the Southern Highland Handicraft Guild during this time. In 1930, Dingman served as an instructor at the John C. Campbell Folk School during its first handcraft-focused session.

Dingman was one of the driving forces in pressing for an economic and social survey of the conditions in the Appalachian region and worked with Dean Thomas P. Cooper from the University of Kentucky to prepare a plan. The first preparatory meeting was held in 1925, at the Russell Sage Foundation in New York City, but the results, Economic and Social Problems and Conditions of the Southern Appalachians, would not be published by the federal government until 1935. The survey, which utilized specialists from state and federal agencies, as well as private organizations, was designed to evaluate availability of educational facilities, land utilization, population distribution and social conditions. The survey was the first of its kind to be made by the federal government for the Appalachian region and immediately effected services in the region, with Dingman offering courses at Berea College to train Federal Emergency Relief Administration workers in Public Welfare and adding birth control clinics throughout the mountain region beginning in 1939.

The Depression brought other changes for Dingman, as her sister Jeanette, mother of future Nobel Prize winner, John B. Fenn, and her family relocated to Kentucky after her husband lost his job in New York. Then in 1939, her sister Mary returned from her work abroad and joined Dingman in Kentucky as well. She resigned from the CSMW at the end of 1941 because of a heart condition she had developed, but continued to work at Berea College until her retirement in 1952.

== Death and legacy ==
Dingman died on April 22, 1978, in Berea, Kentucky, donating her remains to medical study. She is remembered for her pioneering work to professionalize social service in the Appalachias. Dingman's papers are housed in the Hutchins Library of Berea College.
