= Anna Ernberg =

American artist (1874–1940)

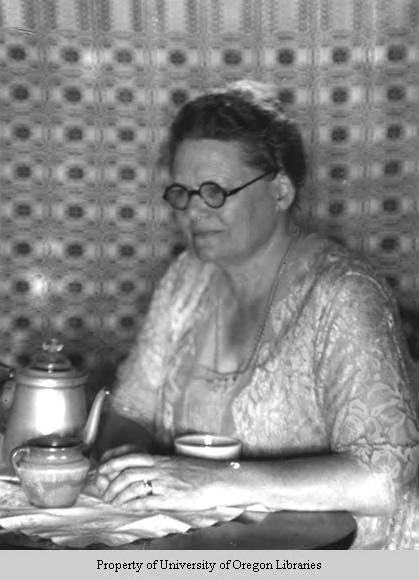
- Born: June 6, 1874; Kristianstad, Sweden
- Died: April 1, 1940 (aged 65); Berea, Kentucky
- Employer: Berea College

Anna Ernberg (6 June 1874 – 1 April 1940) was a Swedish-born American artist, educator, and "one of the most visible proponents of the Appalachian weaving revival in the early 20th century".

== Early life and emigration ==
Anna Ernberg was born on 6 June 1874 in Kristianstad, Sweden. She was educated at the Normal School of Sweden and Sloyd School.

With her husband, Hjalmar, and two sons, Otto and Axel, Ernberg emigrated to America in 1898 while in her 20s. She initially found work at the Pratt Institute and as a weaving instructor at the Teachers College, Columbia University, where she worked for a decade.

In 1911, now a widow, Ernberg wrote to a friend expressing her wish to relocate, and her admiration of Berea College, Kentucky and its mission to revive the mountain weaving traditions of Appalachia. The friend, William Wade, passed her letter to William Goodall Frost, the college's president, who offered Ernberg the role of Superintendent of Fireside Industries, with a mandate to preserve "that which is traditional and familiar to the older women in the mountain."

== Berea College ==
At Berea, Ernberg worked as an instructor, supervisor, and designer, as well as being a tireless fundraiser, traveling widely to sell the products of Fireside Industries.

During her first five years at Berea, Ernberg raised funds towards the construction of a building originally known as the "Log Palace" (later the Log House). Built using the wood of Kentucky's state tree, tulip poplar, the structure was intended to honor the "revival of the colonial arts in the Southern Mountains and the mountain women who weave to educate their families". The three-storey building ultimately housed salesfloors and showrooms, production and finishing rooms, craft storage, and housing for the Ernberg family. The completed building was dedicated on 2 May 1917. Today, it is "the oldest, continually run craft gallery in the state of Kentucky".

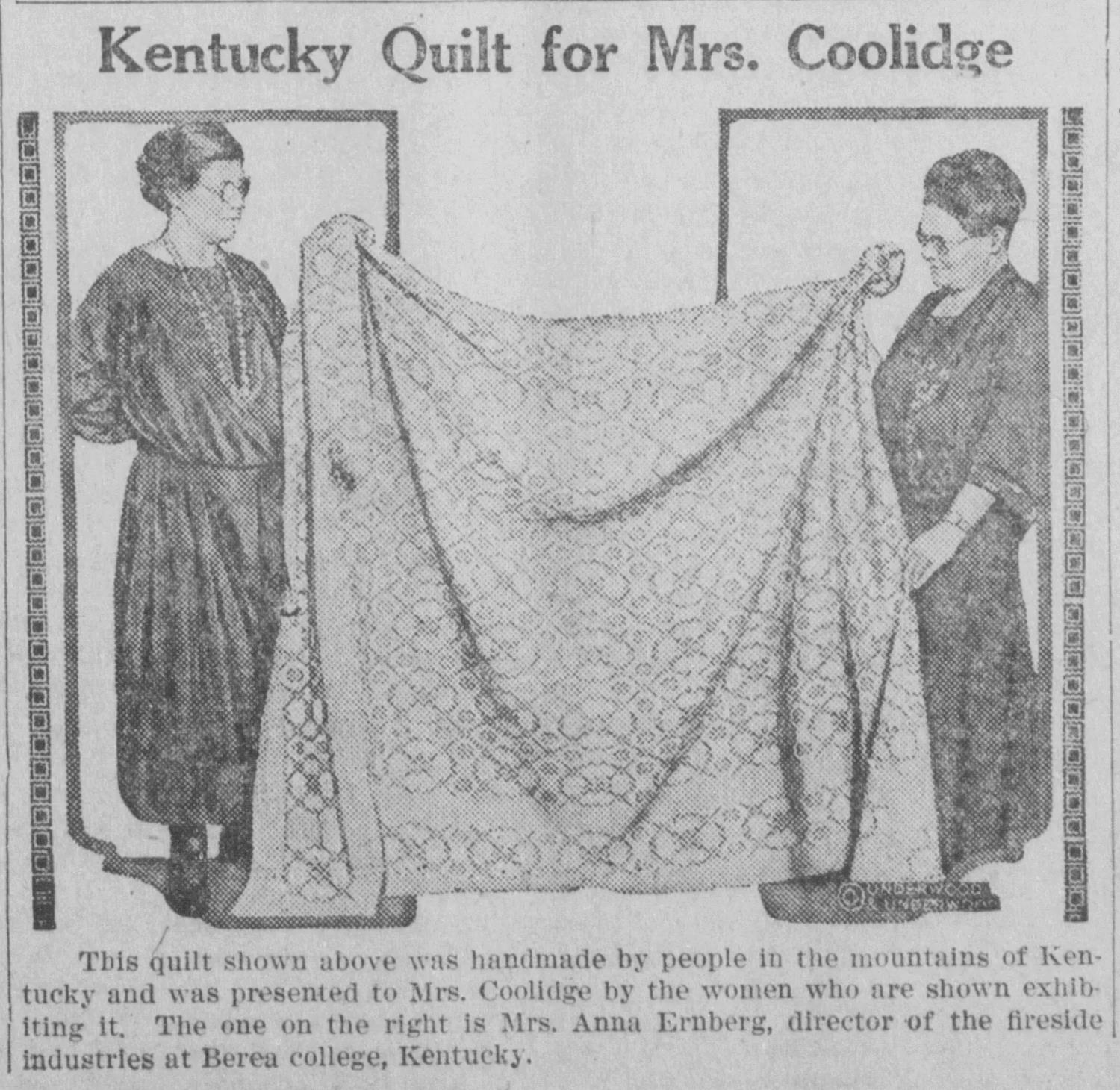
Ernberg presenting a Kentucky Quilt to Grace Coolidge, 1924

Ernberg later undertook further fundraising efforts to expand the space afforded to developing weaving and its tuition, including towards the Sunshine Ballard Cottage. Ernberg also designed a more compact counterbalance loom, better suited to the small cabins from which many craftspeople worked, and intended to put less strain on weavers' bodies.

Noteworthy pupils at Berea under Ernberg included Lucy Calista Morgan, founder of the Penland School of Craft, and Lou Tate, founder of Little Loomhouse in Louisville.

In 1930, Ernberg was named by journalist Ida Tarbell among the "fifty living women who in my judgment have done the most for the welfare of the United States, whether in business, in the arts, professions, social service, or other callings." She has since been called "a central figure in the Appalachian Craft Revival".

Ernberg remained Superintendent of Fireside Industries until her retirement in 1936. She died on 1 April 1940 in the Berea College hospital.
