= Mary Dingman =

American social and peace activist

- Dingman in 1941
- Born: Mary Agnes Dingman; April 9, 1875; Newark, New Jersey
- Died: March 21, 1961 (aged 85); Berea, Kentucky
- Other names: Mary A. Dingman
- Occupations: social activist, peace activist
- Years active: 1917–1954

Mary Dingman (April 9, 1875 – March 21, 1961) was an American social and peace activist, who served as a staff member of the Young Women's Christian Association (YWCA) to develop programs to improve the working conditions of women and children in the workforce. Traveling throughout the world, beginning in 1917, she organized programs in the United States, Europe, and Asia. In 1931, she joined the pacifist movement and serve as chair of the Peace and Disarmament Committee of the Women's International Organisations for a decade. Turning her attention to the need for world cooperation, she pressed for the formalization of the United Nations, serving as a delegate to the first United Nations conference. She was employed as a child welfare advocate by the UN from 1948 until her retirement in 1954.

== Early life ==
Mary Agnes Dingman was born on April 9, 1875 (Note: New Jersey Biographical Dictionary gives Dingman's birth year as 1864. Various other sources indicate 1875. 1875 has been used, as it is confirmed with the 1880 and 1900 US Federal Censuses, showing that Dingman was born in 1875 and that her mother, born in 1854, was unlikely to have had a child when she was ten years old.) in Newark, New Jersey to Nettie Clyde (née Beveridge) and James Alva Dingman. She was the oldest child in the large family which moved to the village of Spring Valley, New York, before her fifth birthday. Her father, originally from Canada was a physician and a devout Methodist, who encouraged his children toward humanitarian service, inspiring Dingman and her younger sister, Helen, in their careers. Dingman was a student at Northfield Seminary in Northfield, Massachusetts, and after graduating in 1895, entered the normal school at New Paltz, New York. Earning her teaching certificate in 1899, she continued her education at Teachers College, Columbia University, attaining her bachelor's degree in 1910.

== Career ==
Upon completion of her education, Dingman moved to Wellesley, Massachusetts, where she was employed at Dana Hall School, as an economics and history teacher from 1910 to 1914. In 1914, she was hired by the YWCA USA to coordinate assistance programs for the Industrial Department, which aided women working in factories. In 1917, she was selected to go to France and assist with surveying and creating a plan to address the concerns of women working in munitions factories. While the women, largely made up of refugees, were provided with food and lodging by the French War Department, they had few conveniences. Dingman established fifteen Foyers des Allies, or social centers, to provide the women workers with books, writing materials and a communal area in which to socialize when they were not working. At the end of World War I, Dingman became responsible for establishing YWCA clubs throughout Belgium and France. Over the next several years, she established organizations in over twenty locations. She was awarded the Adolphe Max Bourgmestre de Bruxelles Medal by Belgium and in 1919 was honored by the French government with the Jeanne D'Arc Liberatrice du Territoire and La Victoire Restaure le Droit plaques for her service.

In 1921, Dingman moved to London and became the Chief Industrial Secretary of the World YWCA. In 1923, she went to China to establish protocols for the Far East and remained there for two years. She found conditions in the textile industry similar to those which had existed in England during the Industrial Revolution, with low wages, unsafe conditions, and a labor force dominated by women and children. Working with a group of women and the Shanghai Municipal Council, regulations were drafted to change the existing labor laws, but they were not adopted because of clashes between the Kuomintang and the civil authorities. In 1930, when the World YWCA relocated to Geneva, Dingman moved to Switzerland and the following year began to work with pacifist organizations. Over the course of her fourteen years as Secretary, she traveled to more than forty countries throughout Australia and New Zealand, East Asia and Europe, creating educational programs for women factory workers. She also trained YWCA personnel to oversee the initiatives, which were developed after analyzing each country's labor regulations and safety measures.

The World YWCA, offered space in its Geneva headquarters to a newly formed umbrella organization, the Peace and Disarmament Committee of the Women's International Organisations (PDCWIO) in 1931 and provided clerical assistance for the committee through Evelyn Beresford Fox. Fox would become Dingman's colleague, as well as her life-long companion. Dingman was elected to head the PCDWIO and represented the organization at the World Disarmament Conference held in 1932. In 1935, she was re-elected to the presidency and resigned her post with the YWCA. She spoke at the League of Nations in 1936 and traveled widely as a lecturer on disarmament. In December 1939, she was arrested in Italy and held without charge for twenty-four hours while US officials sought her release.

With the outbreak of World War II, Dingman returned to the United States in 1939, settling in Berea, Kentucky, near her sisters Helen and Jeanette, mother of future Nobel Prize winner, John B. Fenn. She left the presidency of the PDCWIO, though she continued to lecture and tour, speaking on pacifism and improving international relations on behalf of the YWCA. Beginning in 1944, she worked to establish the United Nations, having advocated for an international body to replace the League of Nations since 1941. As a field worker for the Women's Action Committee for Victory and Lasting Peace, she lectured to bring public awareness for the organization and advocating for congressional authorization. She attended the inaugural conference of the World Federation of United Nations Associations in 1946 and in 1948 was appointed a consultant by the UN to work on behalf of the International Union for Child Welfare. She worked for the UN until 1954, when she officially retired.

== Death and legacy ==
Dingman died on March 21, 1961, in Berea, Kentucky. Her papers form a collection in the Schlesinger Library of the Radcliffe Institute at Harvard University.

== See also ==
- List of peace activists
