= Gyude Moore =

Former Liberian Minister of Public Works, politician, and development policy expert

William Gyude Moore
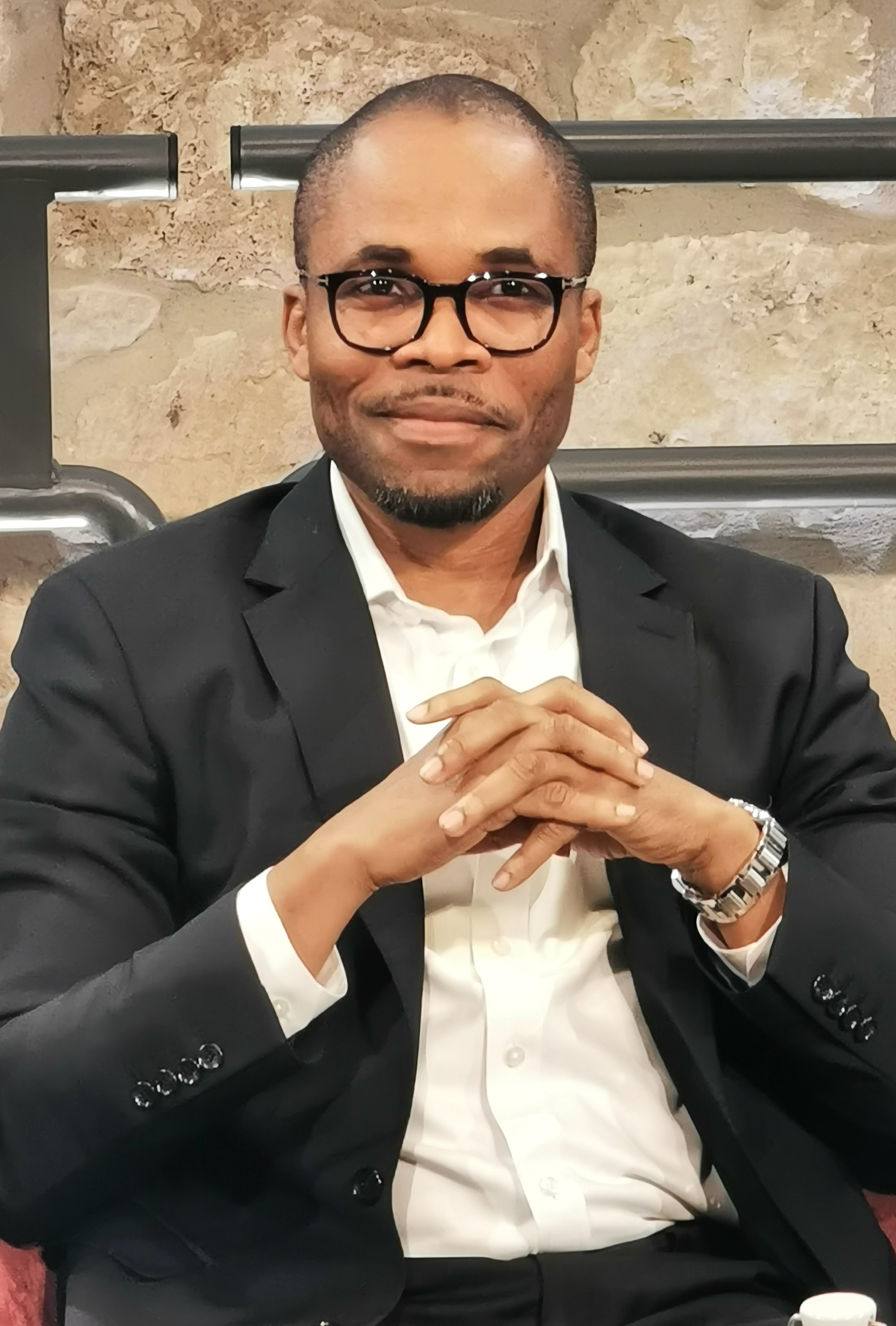

Minister of Public Works of Liberia
- In office 2014–2018
- President: Ellen Johnson Sirleaf
- Preceded by: Antoinette Weeks
- Succeeded by: Mobutu Vlah Nyenpan

Deputy Chief of Staff to the President of Liberia
- In office 2012–2014
- President: Ellen Johnson Sirleaf

Personal details
- Born: Maryland County, Liberia
- Education: Liberia Baptist Theological Seminary; Berea College; Georgetown University

William Gyude Moore is a former minister of public works of Liberia from 2014 to 2018. Before serving as a minister, He was the deputy chief of staff to President Ellen Johnson Sirleaf and head of her Presidential Delivery Unit.

== Early life and education ==
Moore was born in Maryland County, Liberia, before his family moved to Tabou, Ivory Coast, in 1994 during the First Liberian Civil War.

He studied theology at the Liberia Baptist Theological Seminary before moving to the United States to study at Berea College majoring in political science and economics. After graduating from Berea in 2006, he pursued a Master of Science in Foreign Service at Georgetown University's School of Foreign Service. He returned to Liberia as a Scott Fellow and an aide in the office of the president in 2009.

== Career ==
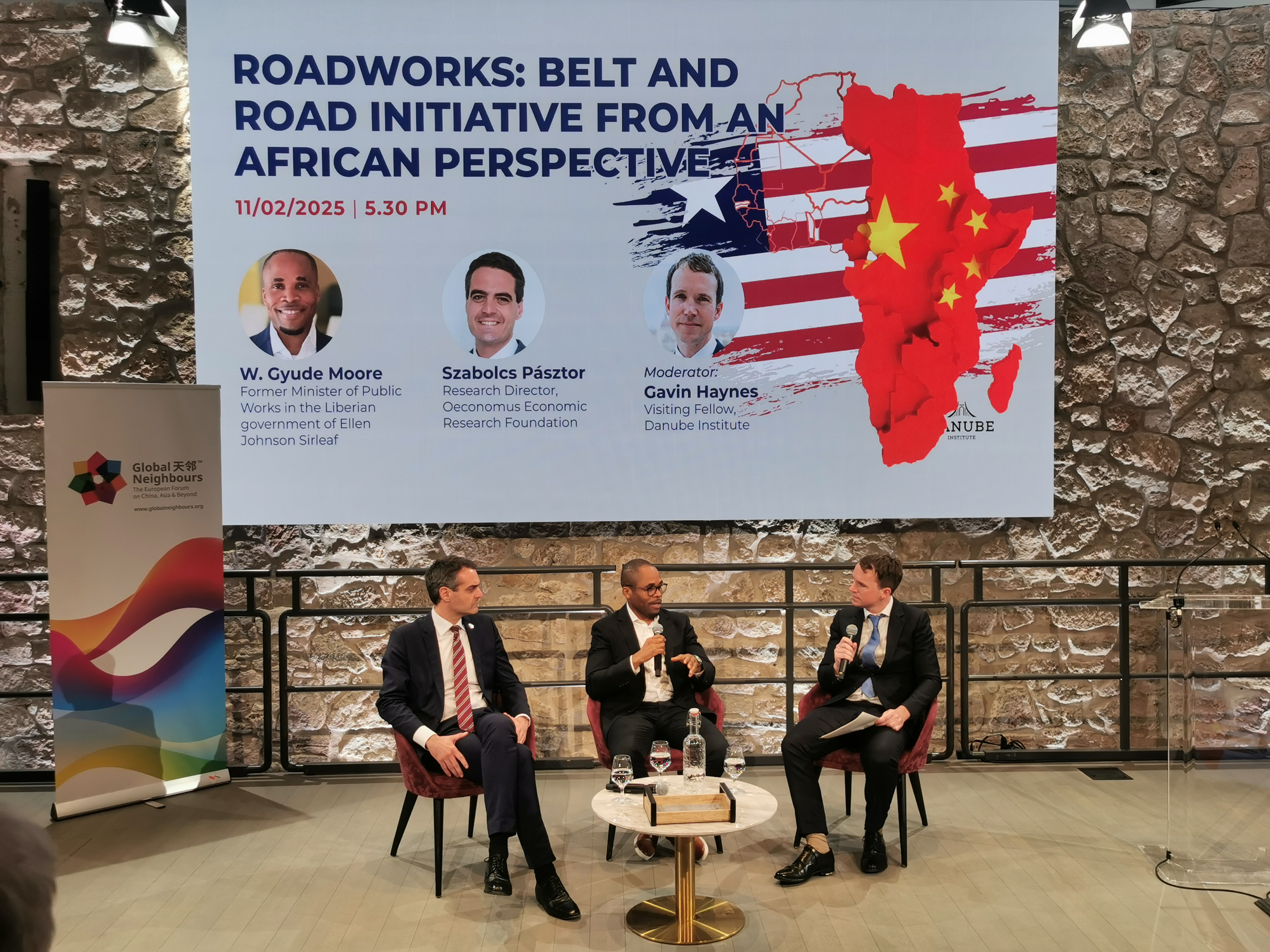
Gyude Moore at the Global Neighbor's Roadworks BRI from an African Perspective conference in 2025

He began his public service career as a Scott Fellow in 2009 in the office of the president, a position he held until 2012. Between 2012 and 2014, he served as the deputy chief of staff and head of the President's Delivery Unit. In December 2014, he was appointed as minister of public works, a position he held until January 2018. His tenure at the ministry was at a critical point that Liberia was dealing with the Ebola outbreak and post-conflict infrastructure development.

After his stint in public service, Moore has spent his time at the Center for Global Development as a senior policy fellow with a focus on infrastructure in fragile states.

He has been a lecturer at the University of Chicago’s Harris School for Public Policy teaching a class on the role of infrastructure in foreign policy and international development. Since 2023, he has taught the same class as a resident Boeing Visiting Chair in International Relations at Schwarzman College, Tsinghua University in Beijing, China.
