= Helen Maynor Scheirbeck =

American educator and activist

Helen Maynor Scheirbeck (August 21, 1935 – December 19, 2010) was a Lumbee educator and activist. Born in Lumberton, North Carolina, she was Assistant Director for Public Programs at the Smithsonian Institution National Museum of the American Indian. Scheirbeck was best known for her work with young Native Americans, training them to work with the United States Congress and other federal agencies in the United States to promote policies that help Indian communities.

Before her work with the Smithsonian Institution, Scheirbeck was the national director for Head Start programs serving American Indian and Alaskan Natives. She has served as a human resources administrator for Save the Children Federation, chairwoman of the U.S. Department of Education Indian Education Task Force, and as a staffer in the U.S. Senate where she helped develop the American Indian Civil Rights Act.

== Professional history ==
=== Early life and education ===
Helen Maynor was born in Lumberton, North Carolina in 1935. Her father, Lacy Maynor, served as a local judge. Scheirbeck earned a Bachelor of Arts in 1957 in education from Berea College in Kentucky. In 1980, she earned a Doctorate in Educational Administration from Virginia Polytechnic Institute and State University.

=== Career ===
Scheirbeck began her professional career as an intern for the National Congress of American Indians, assisting in the founding of the American Indian Higher Education Consortium, which lobbies for tribal colleges and universities on the federal level. She then worked as a staff member for Sam Ervin for the Senate Subcommittee on Constitutional Rights. There she organized the Capitol Conference on Poverty in 1962, where Native American leaders first advocated for Indian participation in the War on Poverty.

She helped establish the Coalition of Indian Controlled School Boards in 1972. She was appointed by President Jimmy Carter to chair the Indian Education Task Force. This body helped define the Indian-controlled schools movement. Scheirbeck was appointed director of the United States Department of Health, Education, and Welfare Office of Indian Education. Here, she developed strategy in 1973 to enable tribal colleges and universities to obtain start-up funds as developing institutions through Title III of the Higher Education Act.

In 1978, Scheirbeck assisted in the development of the Tribally Controlled Community College Assistance Act, and guided it to passage in Congress. This legislation formed the foundation of the tribal college movement in the United States. Scheirbeck was appointed head of the Indian Head Start Program in 1991, where she managed the American Indian and Alaskan Native Head Start Bureau and improved its efficiency nationwide.

From 1987 to 1995, she served on the Board of Trustees of the National Museum of the American Indian, key to its founding. After her term as a trustee ended, she became director of the museum's public programs.
