= Willie Parker (physician) =

American physician

Willie Parker is an American physician, and sits on the board of institutions working in reproductive justice, including as previous member of the Board of Directors of Physicians for Reproductive Health. He "travels to Mississippi every month to the last clinic where women can go to to receive abortions." He has been practicing as an OBGYN for over 20 years, and has drawn acclaim for his book "Life’s Work: A Moral Argument for Choice."

"I was not of the age of accountability during the civil rights movement. I was not born into slavery. I was not born during the labor rebellions of the '20s," Parker said in an interview with NBC News. "In 2017, I'm a women's health provider. This is my time and this is my responsibility.
