= Appalachian Studies Association =

Organization of scholars and activists

The Appalachian Studies Association (ASA) is an organization of scholars and activists interested in Appalachian studies.

According to its web site, “The Appalachian Studies Association (ASA) was formed in 1977 by a group of scholars, teachers, and regional activists who believed that shared community has been and will continue to be important to those writing, researching, and teaching about Appalachia. The Appalachian Studies Association's mission is to encourage study, advance scholarship, disseminate information, and enhance communication between Appalachian peoples, their communities, governmental organizations, and educational institutions.”

The organization hosts an annual academic conference. It also publishes the peer-reviewed Journal of Appalachian Studies, maintains a website, serves as a community for persons interested in writing, researching, and teaching about Appalachia, and acts as a clearinghouse for information about the Appalachian region.

== History ==
Prior to 1977, Appalachian activism, scholarship, and service manifested itself in many ways, including the activities of the Council of the Southern Mountains, an initial “Appalachian Conference” at Clinch Valley College in 1970, and a 1976 gathering at Appalachian State University in Boone, North Carolina, in honor of Appalachian scholar and folklorist Cratis Williams.

The 1976 meeting at Boone, which became known as the Cratis Williams Symposium, gathered scholars from a variety of academic disciplines, and it proved to be a watershed meeting in the development of Appalachian studies. “For the first time,” wrote Appalachian scholar and activist Steve Fisher, “academicians who had felt isolated in fighting the battle for Appalachian Studies…realized that there was a network of people fighting the same battle”.

The Cratis Williams Symposium led to a planning session the following year at Berea College in Berea, KY. This meeting identified seven objectives for future conferences:

1. To encourage Appalachian studies through an annual conference, newsletter, and ad hoc meetings.
2. To provide a forum for exchange of research information.
3. To coordinate analysis across interdisciplinary lines.
4. To increase and spread the knowledge of things Appalachian.
5. To be an advocate for Appalachian research.
6. To relate scholarship to regional needs and concerns of the Appalachian people.
7. To support other organizations’ efforts in harmony with the purposes of the conference.

The first conference was held in 1978 at Berea College, and Appalachian studies conferences have been held every year since. Founded as the “Appalachian Studies Conference” in December 1978, the organizational name was changed to its current “Appalachian Studies Association” in 1993. A parallel effort was launched in 2002 with Wheeling Jesuit University's Appalachian Institute, in accord with the goals set out in two pastoral letters of the United States Conference of Catholic Bishops.

A timeline of the ASA’s history is available on the Appalachian Studies Association website.
