= SOCM =

- Statewide Organizing for Community eMpowerment
- Abbreviation: SOCM
- Formation: 1972; 54 years ago
- Type: Nonprofit
- Tax ID no.: 23-7264556
- Legal status: 501(c)(4)
- Headquarters: Knoxville, Tennessee
- Board President: Erica Davis
- Executive Director: Austin Sauerbrei
- Website: https://www.socm.org/
- Formerly called: Save Our Cumberland Mountains

SOCM stands for Statewide Organizing for Community eMpowerment (previously Save Our Cumberland Mountains) and is a Tennessee community organizing group best known for its opposition to strip mining. It was founded in 1972 to oppose what the organization said were unfair imbalances in property taxes, described by a group of Vanderbilt University students, between small and large landowners in the rural coal mining counties of East Tennessee. SOCM's focus later grew beyond the Cumberland Plateau and Cumberland Mountains regions, to include all of Tennessee. In 2008, SOCM changed its name from Save Our Cumberland Mountains to Statewide Organizing for Community eMpowerment to reflect its growing work in social, economic, and environmental justice. SOCM now has chapters in the cities of Jackson and Knoxville, and Bedford County, Maury County, Rutherford County and Cumberland County. The Roaring River Chapter is made up of residents of Putnam County, Jackson County, and Overton County, Tennessee.

J. W. Bradley of Petros, Tennessee, is a cofounder and longtime leader of the group.

== See also ==
- I Love Mountains
