= Council of the Southern Mountains =

- Founded: 1913
- Dissolved: 1989
- Purpose: Community development
- Region served: Southern Appalachia
- Method: research, education, technical assistance

The Council of the Southern Mountains (CSM) was a non-profit organization, active from 1912 to 1989, concerned with education and community development in southern Appalachia.

== Origins ==
Formally organized as the Conference of Southern Mountain Workers in 1913, for most of the years from 1925 until 1972 the CSM was headquartered in Berea, Kentucky, where it had a close relationship with Berea College. The membership of the CSM had traditionally been drawn from faculty and administrators of mountain colleges and settlement schools, agricultural extension workers, public school administrators, field staff of church home mission boards, and students of Appalachian folk arts. The CSM held an annual conference for its 300 members; published a quarterly magazine, Mountain Life & Work (ML&W), from 1925 to 1989; and organized commissions in which members could meet occasionally to discuss such subjects as health, education, and rural religion. The Conference changed its name in 1944 to Council of Southern Mountain Workers, and in 1954 to Council of the Southern Mountains.

== Expansion ==
Until the 1950s, the CSM's activities were conducted by a volunteer staff headed by an executive secretary who usually held at least a part-time position with Berea College. John C. Campbell was the first executive secretary until his death in 1919. His widow, Olive Campbell, occupied the position until 1928. Helen Dingman, of Berea College's sociology department, served as part-time executive secretary and editor of ML&W until 1942. She was followed by Alva Taylor and Glyn Morris in the 1940s. Financial support from the Russell Sage Foundation and Berea College was cut off in 1949, and the office was closed until 1951.

The CSM began a new phase in 1951 with the hiring of Perley Ayer as executive director. His energetic fund-raising increased the CSM budget from less than $5,000 a year to more than $25,000 by 1956. Two new staff, including Milton Ogle, were hired in 1958. The Ford Foundation transformed the CSM into a substantial organization with a $250,000 grant for community development and education in October 1962. Following President Lyndon Johnson's declaration of the War on Poverty in January 1964, Ogle organized college student volunteers into what would become the Appalachian Volunteers (AV). The new Office of Economic Opportunity gave substantial grants to support rapid expansion of the AV program. By 1966 tension between the CSM's cooperative community development strategy and the emerging conflict orientation of the AV led Ayer to fire Ogle and his top assistant; the rest of the AV staff resigned and incorporated as a separate nonprofit organization. OEO transferred its grants to the new AV organization, which moved its headquarters to Bristol, Tennessee. The CSM continued its community action technician programs, providing technical assistance to anti-poverty groups.

== Urban Appalachian programs ==
The CSM was involved with programs to assist the adjustment of Appalachian migrants to urban areas in the Midwest from the mid-1950s to the early 1970s. Berea College sociologist Roscoe Giffin conducted summer workshops in Berea, with support from the Ford Foundation, on Appalachian culture and spoke at training sessions for social workers in such cities as Chicago, Illinois, and Cincinnati, Dayton and Columbus, Ohio. In 1961 the CSM began its "Hands-Across-the-Ohio" program to follow up the workshops and coordinate its efforts in the Midwest. With financial help from Chicago insurance executive and philanthropist W. Clement Stone, the CSM opened the Chicago Southern Center on Montrose Avenue in the Uptown neighborhood in 1963; it remained an important center for work among Appalachian and Southern migrants until it closed in 1971. Urban renewal and demographic changes scattered the Southern and Appalachian whites from Uptown, and Stone withdrew his support.

== Conflict and decline ==
The departure of the AV staff did not end conflicts within the CSM. As staff grew more critical of Ayer's insistence on strict neutrality on the politics of anti-poverty efforts and economic development in southern Appalachia, the pressure grew on Ayer to step down. In 1966 Loyal Jones replaced Ayer as executive director, but internal controversies were just getting started. The issues came to a head at the annual meetings at Fontana, North Carolina in 1969, and at Lake Junaluska, North Carolina in 1970. A vote at Fontana approved a proposal to require the CSM board of directors to include 51 percent poor people within three years, and resolutions were passed in favor of a guaranteed annual income and opposing the Vietnam War. Conservative critics charged the meeting had been packed with radical outsiders. Conservatives' fears were reinforced the next year at Lake Junaluska, when the meeting voted to oppose strip-mining for coal and took other controversial positions. Funding sources began to withhold grant money, and several weeks later Jones resigned as executive director.

The reorganized CSM board of directors chose Warren Wright, a farmer and self-educated minister, as its new executive director, assisted by CSM staff Isaac Vanderpool and Julian Griggs, but a year later Wright resigned. A new egalitarian model of staff decision-making was instituted. In fall 1972 the CSM moved out of Berea to Clintwood, in the coalfields of Dickenson County, Virginia. A lean staff, often working for subsistence wages, managed to continue CSM activities for another decade and a half, continuing to publish ML&W, giving publicity and support to Black Lung Associations, welfare rights groups, mine health and safety programs, and miners' strikes. The CSM also maintained the Appalachian Bookstore and Record Shop in Berea, and a mobile bookstore that traveled to regional events. The CSM closed its doors in 1989.

== Archives ==
The archives of the CSM were transferred to the Weatherford-Hammond Mountain Collection of the Hutchins Library at Berea College in two collections. The first, covering 1912 to 1970, was received by the college in 1970; it consists of 295 boxes of correspondence, records, newspaper clippings, and photographs. It was catalogued by volunteers and staff and made available for research in 1978. The second collection, covering 1970 to 1989, was received in several batches from 1984 to 1995. The 1970-1989 materials, comprising 268 boxes, were organized and indexed with a grant from the National Historical Publications and Records Commission, with work completed and opened for research in 2006.
