= Appalachian studies =

Academic area studies field concerned with the Appalachian region of the United States

Appalachian studies is the area studies field concerned with the Appalachian region of the United States.

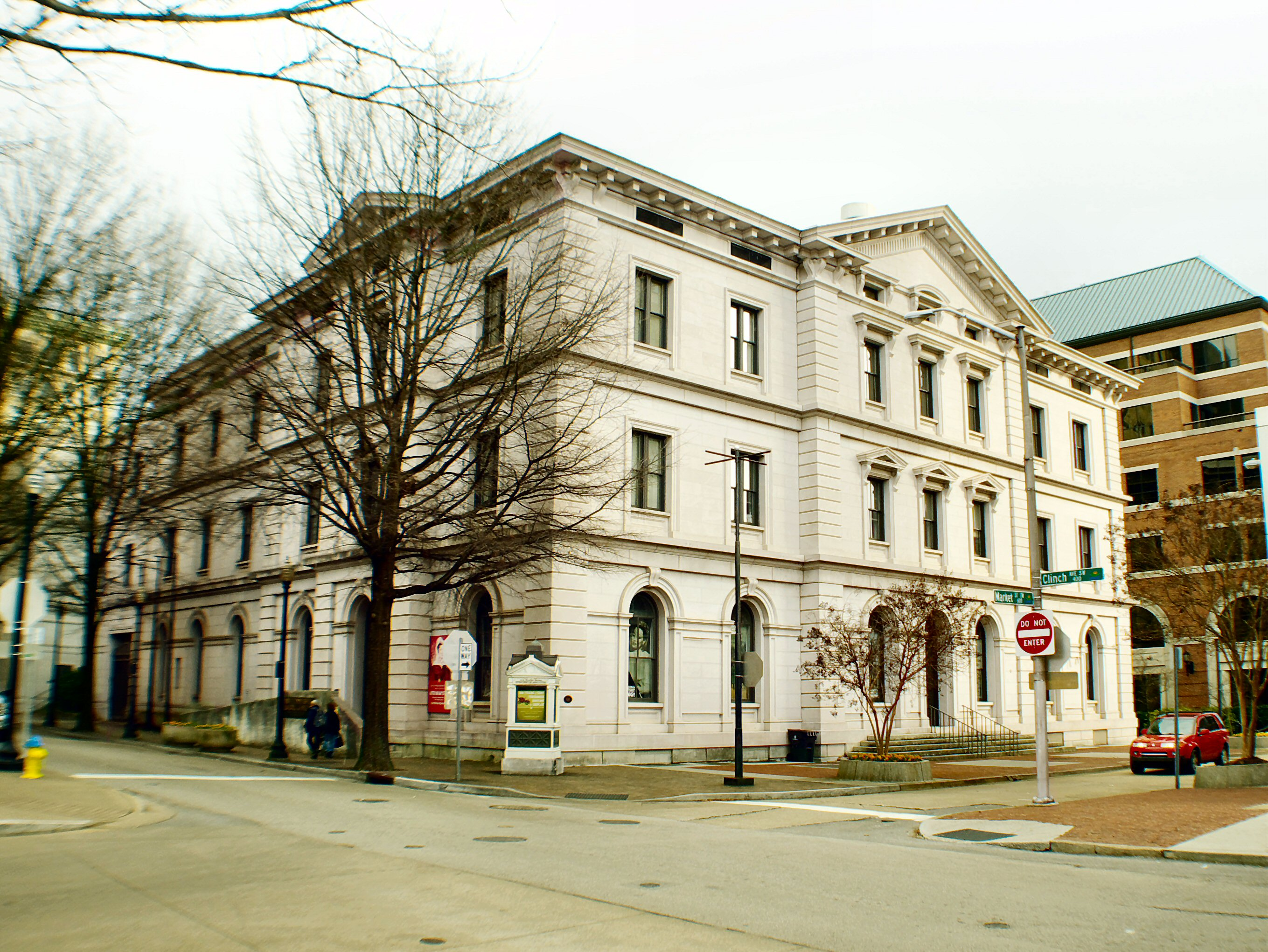
The Old Customs House in Knoxville, Tennessee, United States; the building is now home to the Knox County Library's McClung Collection

== Scholarship ==
Some of the first well-known Appalachian scholarship was done by Cratis D. Williams. His 1937 MA thesis in English from the University of Kentucky focused on 471 ballads and songs from eastern Kentucky and his 1961 PhD dissertation at New York University was called "The Southern Mountaineer in Fact and Fiction" with part of it appearing in The Appalachian Journal 1975–76.

Berea College president W.D. Weatherford received a Ford Foundation grant in 1957 to underwrite an exhaustive regional study, The Southern Appalachian Region: A Survey, published in 1962, which many see as the beginning of the modern Appalachian studies movement.

In 1966, West Virginia University librarian Robert F. Munn noted that "more nonsense has been written about the Southern Mountains than any comparable area in the United States." He also observed that there was "distressingly little in the way of useful primary and secondary materials" available for historical research on Appalachia".

Over the four decades since Munn's comments, much Appalachian scholarship has been published. Appalachian Studies is interdisciplinary, matching the study of the diverse region and its people. Appalachian Studies includes topics such as history, literature, anthropology, music, religion, economics, education, environment, folklore and folk customs, labor issues, women's issues, ethnicity, health care, community organizing, economic development, coal mining, tourism, art, demography, migration, urban planning, and rural planning. Appalachian scholarship has addressed various issues within all of these topics.

Several academic journals are dedicated to Appalachian Studies, including Appalachian Journal, published by Appalachian State University, Journal of Appalachian Studies, published by the Appalachian Studies Association, Now & Then, published by East Tennessee State University, and Appalachian Heritage, published by Berea College.

Much of the scholarship and research about Appalachia is done by scholars who are members of the Appalachian Studies Association.

== Academics ==
A number of colleges and universities in and around Appalachia offer courses and degrees in Appalachian Studies. These range from a Master of Arts in Appalachian Studies offered at Appalachian State University, Shepherd University, and East Tennessee State University, to undergraduate minors at a dozen schools. Many schools also have Appalachian Studies collections and archives in their libraries.

== Brief bibliography ==
The following is a brief list of important books in the Appalachian Studies canon that would serve as a good introductory reading list. These titles were culled from a poll of members of the Steering Committee of the Appalachian Studies Association taken in the Spring of 2007.

- Abramson, Rudy; Haskell, Jean, eds. (2006). Encyclopedia of Appalachia. Knoxville: University of Tennessee Press.
- Biggers, Jeff (2006). The United States of Appalachia: How Southern Mountaineers Brought Independence, Culture and Enlightenment to America. Emeryville, CA: Shoemaker and Hoard.
- Billings, Dwight B.; Norman, Gurney; Ledford, Katherine, eds. (2001). Back talk from Appalachia : Confronting Stereotypes. Lexington: University Press of Kentucky.
- Edwards, Grace Toney; Asbury, JoAnn Aust; Cox, Ricky, eds. (2006). A Handbook to Appalachia: an Introduction to the Region. Knoxville: University of Tennessee Press.
- Fisher, Stephen L., ed. (1993). Fighting Back in Appalachia: Traditions of Resistance and Change. Philadelphia: Temple University Press.
- Inscoe, John C., ed. (2000). Appalachians and Race: the Mountain South from Slavery to Segregation. Lexington: University Press of Kentucky.
- Obermiller, Phillip J.; Maloney, Michael E., eds. (2007). Appalachia: Social Context Past and Present (5th ed.). Kendall Hunt Publishers.
- Pudup, Mary Beth; Billings, Dwight B.; Waller, Altina L., eds. (1995). Appalachia in the Making: the Mountain South in the Nineteenth Century. Chapel Hill: University of North Carolina Press.
- Shapiro, Henry D. (1978). Appalachia on Our Mind: the Southern Mountains and Mountaineers in the American Consciousness, 1870-1920. Chapel Hill: University of North Carolina Press.
- Straw, Richard A.; Blethen, H. Tyler, eds. (2004). High Mountains Rising: Appalachia in Time and Place. Urbana: University of Illinois Press.
- Williams, John Alexander (2002). Appalachia: A History. Chapel Hill: University of North Carolina Press.

== See also ==
- Bluegrass in Baltimore

== Sources ==
- Appalachian Studies Association, "Appalachian Libraries and Archives," Appalachian Studies Association Website. 2007. Accessed May 4, 2007
- Appalachian Studies Association, "Appalachian Studies Syllabi," Appalachian Studies Association Website. 2007. Accessed May 9, 2007
- Appalachian Studies Association, "Marie Tedesco's Selected Bibliography," Appalachian Studies Association Website. 2007. Accessed April 22, 2007
- Appalachian Studies Association, "Programs in Appalachian Studies," Appalachian Studies Association Website. 2007. Accessed May 22, 2007
