= Berea College =

Work college in Berea, Kentucky, US

- Motto: God has made of one blood all peoples of the earth.
- Type: Private liberal arts work college
- Established: 1855; 171 years ago
- Religious affiliation: Christianity
- Academic affiliations: Space-grant
- Endowment: $1.83 billion (2025)
- President: Cheryl L. Nixon
- Faculty: 139
- Undergraduates: 1,454
- Location: Berea, Kentucky, United States; 37.573°N 84.292°W
- Campus: Exurban (140 acres)
- Colors: (Blue and white)
- Nickname: Mountaineers
- Sporting affiliations: NCAA Division III—HCAC
- Website: berea.edu
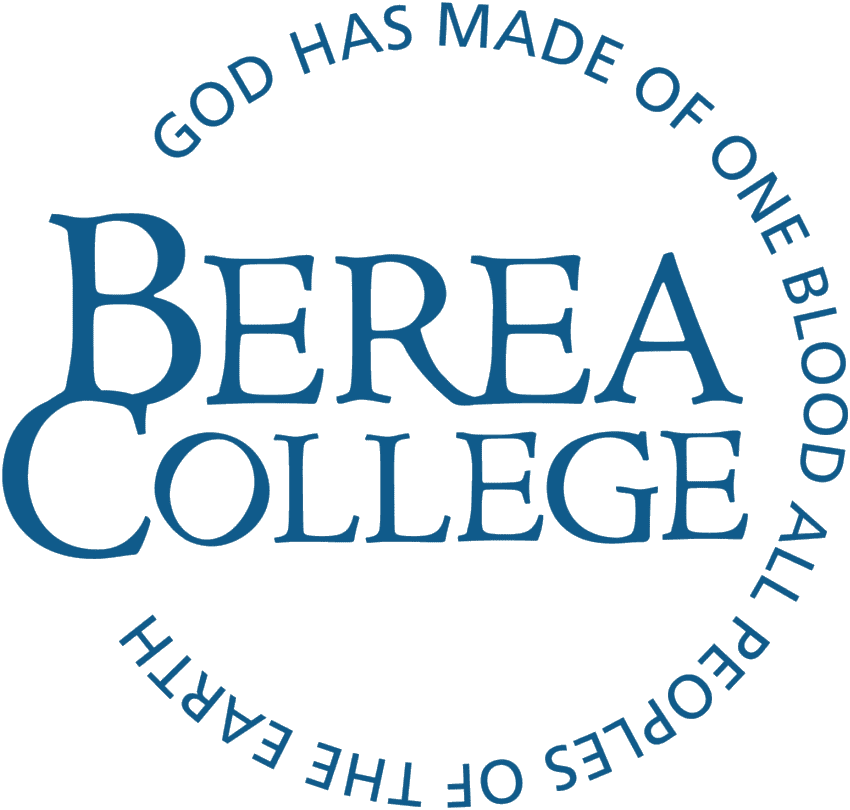

Berea College is a private liberal arts work college in Berea, Kentucky, United States. Founded in 1855, it was the first college in the Southern United States to be coeducational and racially integrated. It admitted non-White students from as early as 1866 until 1904, and again after 1954.

The college participates in federal work-study and work college programs that cover the remaining tuition fees after subtracting the total sum a student receives from Pell Grant, other grants, and scholarships. Most of the college's students come from southern Appalachia but students come from more than 40 states in the United States and 70 other countries. Approximately half of them identify as people of color.

Berea offers bachelor's degrees in 33 majors. It incorporates a mandatory work-study program in which students do a minimum of 10 hours per week of work for the college.

== History ==
Founded in 1855 by the abolitionist and Augusta College graduate John Gregg Fee (1816–1901), Berea College admitted both black and white students in a fully integrated curriculum, making it the first non-segregated, coeducational college in the South and one of a handful of institutions of higher learning to admit both male and female students in the mid-19th century. The college began as a one-room schoolhouse that also served as a church on Sundays on land that was granted to Fee by politician and abolitionist Cassius Marcellus Clay. Fee named the new community after the biblical Berea. Although the school's first articles of incorporation were adopted in 1859, slavery supporters forced Fee and the teachers out of the area that year.

Fee spent the Civil War years raising funds for the school, trying to provide for his family in Cincinnati, and working at Camp Nelson. He returned afterward to continue his work at Berea. He spent nearly 18 months working mostly at Camp Nelson, where he helped provide facilities for the freedmen and their families, as well as teaching and preaching. He helped get funds for barracks, a hospital, a school, and a church.

In 1866, Berea's first full year after the war, it had 187 students, 96 Black and 91 white. It began with preparatory classes to ready students for study at the college level. In 1869, the first college students were admitted, and the first bachelor's degrees were awarded in 1873. Almost all the South's private and state colleges were racially segregated. Berea was the main exception until a new state law in 1904 forced its segregation. The college challenged the law in state court and appealed to the U.S. Supreme Court in Berea College v. Kentucky. When the challenge failed, the college had to become an all-white school, but it raised funds to establish the Lincoln Institute in 1912 in Simpsonville, Kentucky, to educate Black students. In 1950, when the Day Law was amended to allow integration of schools at the college level, Berea resumed its integrated policies.

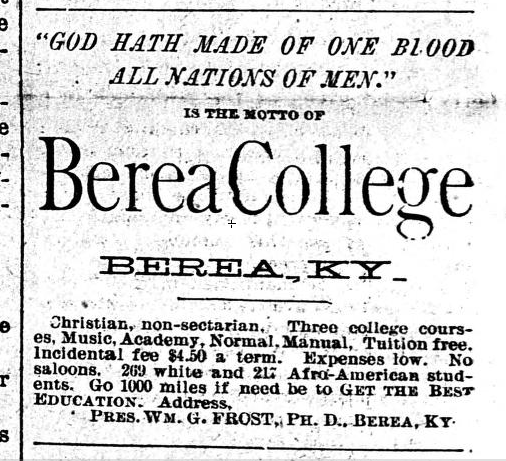
An advertisement for Berea College from 1900, placed in a Black newspaper in Minnesota

In 1911, the college restricted students to eating at college-owned facilities. A local businessman sued but the Kentucky Court of Appeals upheld a lower court ruling that the college's restriction was legal (Gott v. Berea College).

In 1925, advertiser Bruce Barton, a future congressman, sent a letter to 24 wealthy men in America to raise funds for the college. Every letter was returned with a minimum of $1,000 in donation. During World War II, Berea was one of 131 colleges nationally that took part in the V-12 Navy College Training Program, which offered students a path to a navy commission.

Until 1968, Berea provided pre-college education in addition to a college-level curriculum. That year, the elementary and secondary schools (Foundation School) were discontinued in favor of focusing on undergraduate college education.

=== Presidents ===
Presidents of the college have included:

| | Name | Years as president |
|---|---|---|
| 1 | Henry Fairchild | (1869–1889) |
| 2 | William Boyd Stewart | (1890–1892) |
| 3 | William Goodell Frost | (1892–1920) |
| 4 | William J. Hutchins | (1920–1939) |
| 5 | Francis S. Hutchins | (1939–1967) |
| 6 | Willis D. Weatherford | (1967–1984) |
| 7 | John B. Stephenson | (1984–1994) |
| 8 | Larry Shinn | (1994–2012) |
| 9 | Lyle D. Roelofs | (2012–2023) |
| 10 | Cheryl Nixon | (2023–present) |

== Academics ==
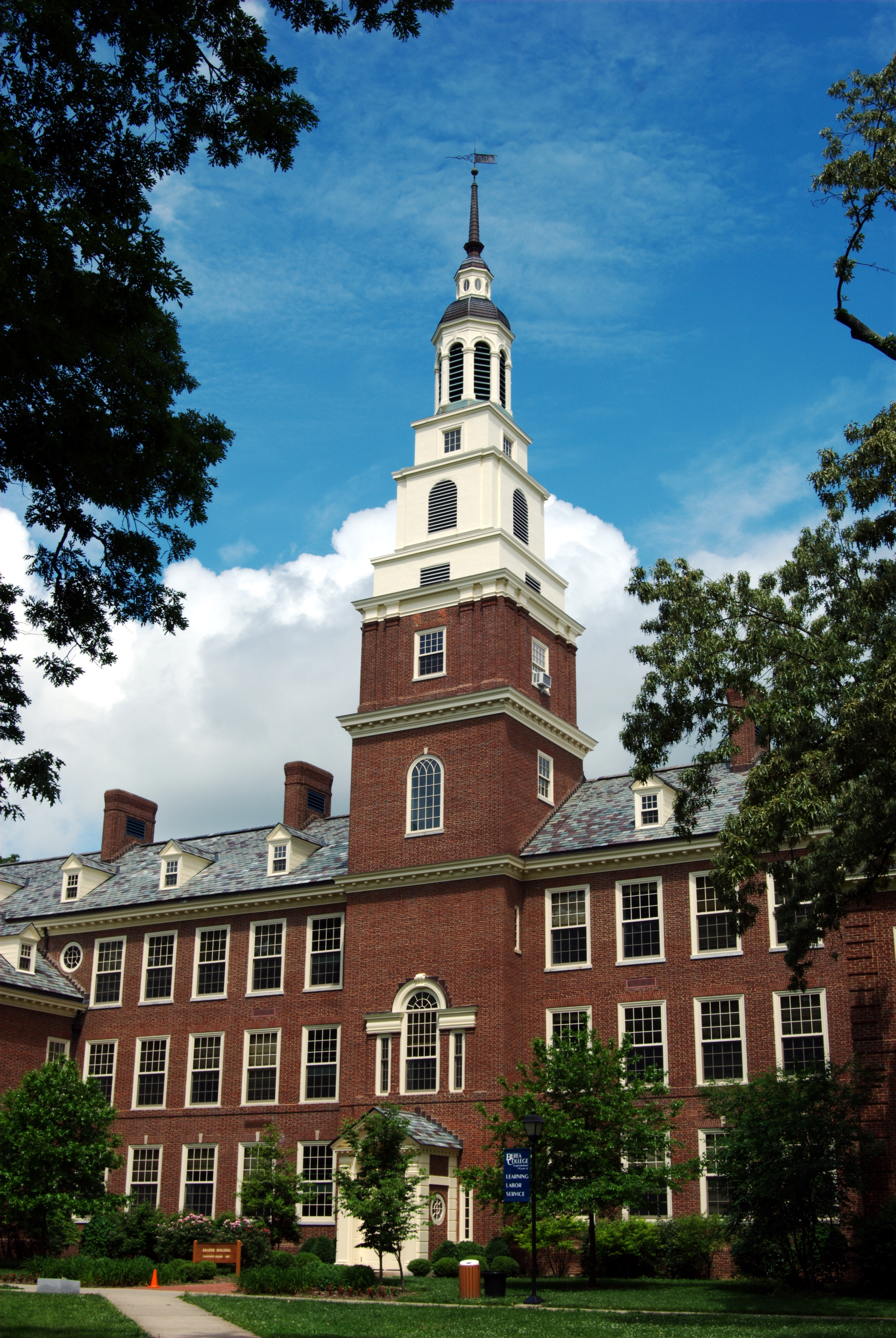
Draper Building

Berea College offers 33 majors and 39 minors from which its 1,600 students can choose. Students who wish to pursue a field of study that cannot be met through an established major may propose an independent major, provided they meet the criteria in the college catalog's definition of a major. The student must secure independent major advisers (primary and secondary). Its most popular majors, based on 2021 graduates, were:

- Business Administration and Management (30)
- Computer and Information Sciences (28)
- Biology/Biological Sciences (21)
- Psychology (20)
- Human Development and Family Studies (19)
- Mass Communication/Media Studies (16)
- Engineering Technologies/Technicians (14)
- Political Science and Government (14)

To ensure every student has access to fully experience a liberal arts education, the college provides significant funding to assist students in studying abroad. Berea students are also eligible for the Thomas J. Watson Fellowship, which provides funding for a year of study abroad after graduation.

All students are required to attend the college on a full-time basis. They are also required to attend at least six convocation events each semester and receive academic credit. The convocations are designed as a supplement to the curriculum by encouraging educational experience and cultural enrichment. Topics range across academic fields and include lectures, symposia, concerts, and the performing arts. These events are free to Berea College students and open to the public.

=== Rankings and outcomes ===
Academic rankings

Liberal arts
- U.S. News & World Report: 40
- Washington Monthly: 2

National
- Forbes: 453
- WSJ/College Pulse: 311

In 2024, Washington Monthly ranked Berea College first in the U.S. among national liberal arts colleges based on its contribution to the public good, as measured by social mobility, research, and promoting public service. The New York Times also ranked Berea first in its 2023 College Access Index based on economic diversity. The 2025 annual ranking of U.S. News & World Report categorizes Berea as "more selective" and rates it 40th overall, first in "Service Learning," second for "Most Innovative Schools," tied for 9th in "Best Undergraduate Teaching", and fifth in "Top Performers in Social Mobility" among U.S. liberal colleges. Kiplinger's Personal Finance placed Berea 35th in its 2019 ranking of 149 best-value U.S. liberal arts colleges.

According to 2022 data from College Scorecard, Berea College graduates earn a median salary of $40,000 ten years after their entry into the institution. Mathematics majors earn around $18,000, biology $29,000, psychology $35,000, and nursing $57,000. 51% of Berea graduates earn higher than a typical high school graduate of the corresponding area.

=== Scholarships and work program ===
About 75% of the college's incoming class is drawn from the Appalachian region of the South and some adjoining areas, and about 8% are international students. Generally, no more than one student is admitted from a given country in a single year. This policy ensures that 70 or more nationalities are usually represented in the student body of Berea College. All international students are admitted on full scholarships with the same regard for financial need as U.S. students.

Beginning in the fall semester of 2027, Berea College will meet all demonstrated financial need of admitted students, without requiring loans. To support its extensive scholarship program, Berea College has one of the largest financial reserves of any American college when measured on a per-student basis. The endowment was $1.6 billion as of June 30, 2021. The base of Berea College's finances is dependent on substantial contributions from alumni and from individuals, foundations, and corporations that support the mission of the college. The endowment increased from $150 million (~$381 million in 2025) in 1985.

In 2017, the Tax Cuts and Jobs Act enacted an excise tax of 1.4% of endowment incomes that exceed net assets of at least $500,000 per student. Due to the size of Berea's endowment and number of full-time enrolled students, this tax bill would have reduced the number of students it could serve. The Bipartisan Budget Act of 2018 provided an exemption for colleges and universities with fewer than 500 tuition-paying students, making Berea College exempt as it provides tuition-free education to all students.

As a work college, Berea has a student work program in which all students work on campus 10 or more hours per week. Berea is one of nine federally recognized work colleges in the United States and one of two in Kentucky (Alice Lloyd College being the other) to have mandatory work study programs. Employment opportunities range from busing tables at the Boone Tavern Hotel, a historic business owned by the college, to leading campus tours for visitors and prospective students, or making brooms, ceramics and woven items in Student Craft. Other job duties include campus photographer, building management, resident assistant, teaching assistant, food service, gardening and grounds keeping, information technology, woodworking, and secretarial work.

As of 2022, students were paid an hourly wage from $5.60 to $8.60 by the college, based on the WLS ("Work, Learning, and Service") level attached to individual labor positions. The college regularly increases student pay on a yearly basis, but it has never been equivalent to the federal minimum wage in the school's history. Because of the scheduling demands of both an academic requirement and a labor requirement, students are not allowed to work at off-campus jobs.

=== Folk dance ===
Berea is widely known as a folk dance hub, teaching square, contra, English, and other kinds of movement. The college offers community folk dances most weekends. The campus has ten dance groups (including Middle Eastern, Swing, Latino, African, and hip hop), a minor in dance, and 25 dance classes.

Physical education instructor Oscar Gunkler brought folk dance to Berea in the 1920s. The Berea College Country Dancers were founded in 1938 by Frank Smith. Berea's annual Christmas Country Dance School was started the same year by Smith and May Gadd, the first director of the Country Dance and Song Society.

Berea's Country Dancers go on tour each semester and danced at the White House in 1963. In 1970, Raymond Kane McLain of The McLain Family Band joined the faculty. He directed the Country Dancers, taught Appalachian music and dance courses, and offered the first bluegrass music course in the United States. Dance programs were established as part of the college's Health and Human Performance Department in 1995 by Susan Spalding. International dance caller and writer Bob Dalsemer is one of many who got his start at a Berea dance.

=== Christian identity ===
Berea College was founded by Protestant Christians. It maintains a Christian identity separate from any particular denomination. The college's motto, "God has made of one blood all peoples of the earth", is from Acts 17:26. The college's modern religious identity has been described as influenced by Christian egalitarianism and progressive theology. Religious life on campus is centered around the Willis D. Weatherford Jr. Campus Christian Center, which "provides opportunities for students, faculty and staff to participate in worship, prayer and meditation, devotional study of Christian scripture and interfaith conversation." In an effort to be sensitive to the diverse preferences and experiences of students and faculty, courses are designed to be taught with respect for each student's spiritual journey, regardless of religious identification.

=== Library collections ===
The Hutchins Library maintains an extensive collection of books, archives, and music pertaining to Southern Appalachian history and culture. The Southern Appalachian Archives contain organizational records, personal papers, oral histories, and photographs, including the papers of the Council of the Southern Mountains (1912–1989) and the Appalachian Volunteers (1963–1970).

== Student life ==
Student body composition as of September 2024
| Race and ethnicity | Total |
|---|---|
| White | 44% |
| Black | 19% |
| Hispanic | 15% |
| Other (Note: Other consists of Multiracial Americans & those who prefer to not say.) | 10% |
| Foreign national | 8% |
| Asian | 4% |
Economic diversity
| Low-income (Note: The percentage of students who received an income-based federal Pell grant intended for low-income students.) | 82% |
| Affluent (Note: The percentage of students who are a part of the American middle class at the bare minimum.) | 18% |

Since 2002, all students at Berea have received laptops that they keep upon graduation. Students are not required to pay for the computers, but do provide a small fee to support the technological infrastructure. Students must have a parking decal to have a car on campus.

Since 1875, Berea College celebrates Mountain Day, a holiday set aside to enjoy being together in nature. Students take off from classes for a sunrise hike to the top of the Pinnacle Mountain and engage in games, performances, food, and other festivities. Another unique holiday to Berea College is Labor Day, where the campus takes a break from classes to recognize and celebrate the value of student work. Established in 1921, it has expanded to help students find labor placements for the following academic year and soon-to-be graduates prepare for life after college.

== Athletics ==
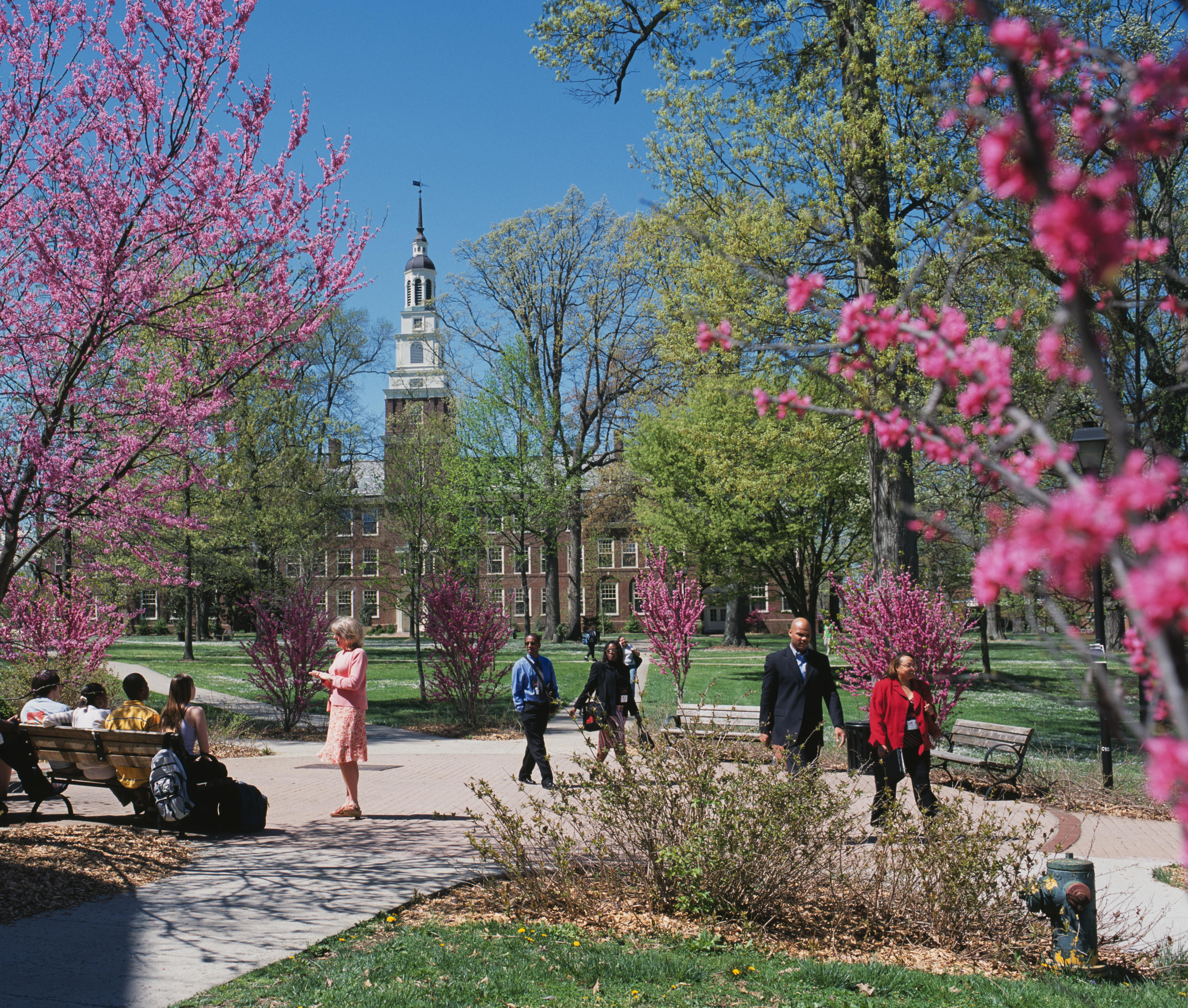
College grounds

The Berea athletic teams are called the Mountaineers. The college is a member of Division III of the National Collegiate Athletic Association (NCAA), and joined the Heartland Collegiate Athletic Conference (HCAC) in July 2024 after two years in the Collegiate Conference of the South (CCS). They were also a member of the United States Collegiate Athletic Association (USCAA). The Mountaineers previously competed in the USA South Athletic Conference (USA South) from 2017–18 to 2021–22; as an NCAA D-III Independent from 2014–15 to 2016–17; and in the Kentucky Intercollegiate Athletic Conference (KIAC; now currently known as the River States Conference (RSC) since the 2016–17 school year) of the National Association of Intercollegiate Athletics (NAIA) from 1916–17 to 2013–14.

Berea competes in 14 intercollegiate varsity sports: Men's sports include baseball, basketball, cross country, golf, soccer, tennis and track & field; while women's sports include basketball, cross country, soccer, softball, tennis, track & field and volleyball.

=== Move to NCAA Division III ===
On February 20, 2012, the NCAA announced it had granted Berea permission to begin a one-year period exploring membership in its Division III, non-scholarship athletic program.

On May 4, 2016, the USA South announced that Berea would join the league effective in the 2017–18 school year.

=== Joining the CCS ===
The USA South announced in February 2022 that it would split into two leagues the following July, with eight of its then 19 members, including Berea, establishing the new Collegiate Conference of the South.

=== Move to the HCAC ===
On June 1, 2023, Berea and the Heartland Collegiate Athletic Conference announced that the Mountaineers would join that league after the 2023–24 school year.

=== Men's basketball ===
On February 4, 1954, Irvine Shanks played for Berea against Wilmington College, breaking the color barrier in college basketball in Kentucky.

== Notable alumni and faculty ==
- Daniel S. Bentley (1850–1916), American minister, writer, newspaper founder
- A. A. Burleigh (c. 1845–1938) American minister, soldier; the first African American adult to attend and graduate in 1875 from Berea College
- John "Bam" Carney – educator; member of the Kentucky House of Representatives from Campbellsville
- Dean W. Colvard – former president of Mississippi State University, notable for his role in a 1963 controversy surrounding the participation of the university's basketball team in the NCAA Tournament
- Frances Berry Coston (1876–1960), journalist, suffragist, educator
- John Courter – educator; an American composer, organist, and carillonneur, considered one of the leading contemporary composers for the carillon
- Anna Ernberg (1874–1940) – Superintendent of Fireside Industries and key figure in the Appalachian Craft Revival
- John Fenn – recipient of 2002 Nobel Prize in Chemistry. Despite his future success, Fenn always felt that he was limited by the lack of meaningful math education in his undergrad years
- Finley Hamilton – United States Representative from Kentucky
- Alix E. Harrow — science fiction writer and winner of a 2019 Hugo Award
- James Shelton Hathaway (1859–1930) newspaper publisher educator, academic administrator, college president and former classics and mathematics faculty at Berea College
- bell hooks (Gloria Jean Watkins) – Distinguished Professor in Residence in Appalachian Studies, author of over thirty books
- Julia Britton Hooks – second African-American woman in the United States to graduate from college and paternal grandmother of Benjamin Hooks
- Silas House – NEH Chair in Appalachian Studies, author and activist
- Akilah Hughes – Writer, comedian, YouTuber, podcaster, and actress
- George Samuel Hurst, health physicist and professor of physics at the University of Kentucky
- Juanita M. Kreps – U.S. Secretary of Commerce under President Jimmy Carter
- W. Gyude Moore – Liberian Minister of Public Works under President Ellen Johnson Sirleaf
- C.E. Morgan – author of All the Living and The Sport of Kings
- Tharon Musser – Tony Award-winning lighting designer known especially for her work on A Chorus Line
- Rude Osolnik (1915–2001) woodturner, educator
- Willie Parker – abortion provider and reproductive rights activist
- K.C. Potter – academic administrator and LGBT rights activist
- Jeffrey Reddick – American screenwriter, best known for creating the Final Destination series
- Jack Roush – founder, CEO, and owner of Roush Fenway Racing, a NASCAR team
- Green Pinckney Russell (1861–1939), American school administrator, college president, and teacher
- Tijan Sallah - Gambian poet, short story writer, biographer and economist at the World Bank
- Helen Maynor Scheirbeck – Assistant Director for Public Programs at the Smithsonian Institution's National Museum of the American Indian
- Chasteen C. Stumm (1848–1895) minister, newspaper journalist, publisher, teacher; attended Berea but did not graduate
- Djuan Trent – Miss Kentucky 2010
- Horace M. Trent – American physicist
- Rocky Tuan – Vice-chancellor of The Chinese University of Hong Kong
- C. C. Vaughn - Kentucky educator and minister
- Muse Watson – American actor
- Billy Edd Wheeler – songwriter, performer and writer
- Carter G. Woodson – African American historian, author, journalist and co-founder of Black History Month
- Frank Lunsford Williams (1864–1953) head teacher and educator in St. Louis

== Bibliography ==
- Adams, John D (2012). "The Berea College Mission to the Mountains: Teacher Training, The Normal Department, and Rural Community Development". Register of the Kentucky Historical Society. 110 (1): 33–66. doi:10.1353/khs.2012.0005. S2CID 154827109.
- Burnside, Jacqueline Grisby. "Philanthropists and politicians: A sociological profile of Berea College, 1855-1908" (PhD dissertation, Yale University) ProQuest Dissertations Publishing, 1988. 8917149.
- Harris, Adam (October 2018). "The Little College Where Tuition Is Free and Every Student Is Given a Job". The Atlantic.
- Lucas, Marion B. "Berea College in the 1870s and 1880s: Student Life at a Racially Integrated Kentucky College." Register of the Kentucky Historical Society 98.1 (2000): 1–22. online
- Nelson, Paul David. "Experiment in interracial education at Berea College, 1858–1908." Journal of Negro History 59.1 (1974): 13–27.
- Peck, Elizabeth. Berea's First Century, 1855–1955. Lexington: University of Kentucky Press, 1955.
- Wilson, Shannon H. Berea College: An Illustrated History. (Lexington: University Press of Kentucky, 2006). ISBN 978-0-8131-2379-0 online
