= Berea, Kentucky =

- City
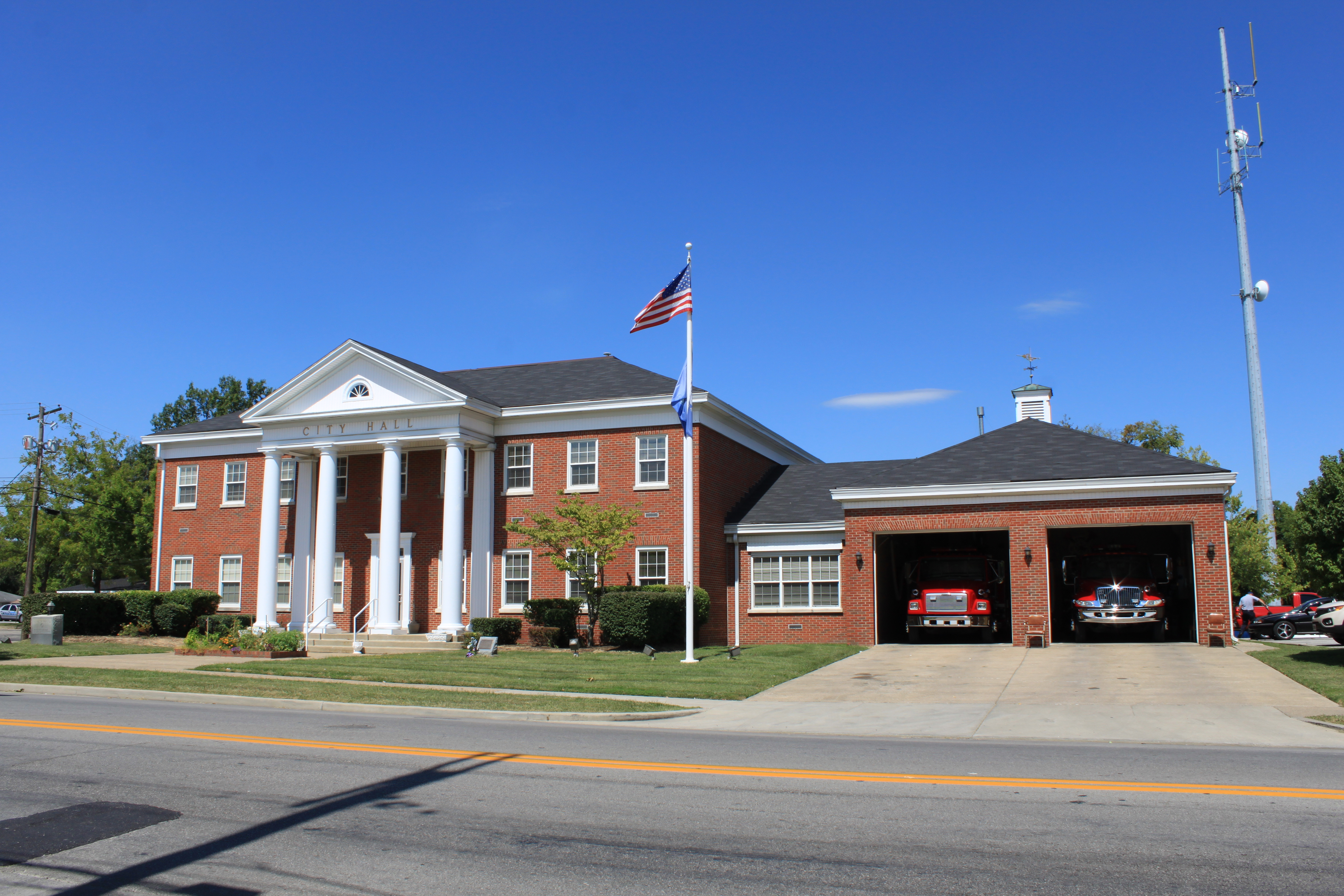
- Berea City Hall

- Flag Seal
- Nickname: The Folk Arts And Crafts Capital Of Kentucky
- Motto: "Where Art's Alive"
- Location of Berea in Madison County, Kentucky.
- Coordinates: 37°35′25″N 84°17′23″W
- Country: United States
- State: Kentucky
- County: Madison

Government
  - Mayor: Bruce Fraley

Area
  - Total: 16.58 sq mi (42.95 km^{2})
  - Land: 16.51 sq mi (42.76 km^{2})
  - Water: 0.073 sq mi (0.19 km^{2})
- Elevation: 958 ft (292 m)

Population (2020)
  - Total: 15,539
  - Estimate (2022): 15,494 ▼
  - Density: 941.1/sq mi (363.36/km^{2})
- Demonym: Berean
- Time zone: UTC−5 (Eastern (EST))
  - Summer (DST): UTC−4 (EDT)
- ZIP codes: 40403-40404
- Area code: 859
- FIPS code: 21-05842
- GNIS feature ID: 2403858
- Website: bereaky.gov

Berea (/bəˈriːə/ bə-REE-ə) is a home rule-class city in Madison County, Kentucky, in the United States. The city is best known for its art festivals, historic restaurants and buildings, and as the home to Berea College, a private liberal arts college. The population was 15,539 at the 2020 census. It is one of the fastest-growing cities in Kentucky, having increased by 27.4% since 2000. Berea is a principal city of the Richmond−Berea Micropolitan Statistical Area, which includes Madison and Rockcastle counties. It was formally incorporated by the state assembly in 1890.

== History ==
The history of Berea is tied with the history of Berea College, which was founded in 1855. The Berea railway station was created in 1882 as part of the Kentucky Central Railroad, and later the Louisville and Nashville Railroad (L&N). Berea was formally incorporated by the state assembly in 1890.

In April 1996 a tornado went through the city, causing damage to about 800-1000 homes, with 20 percent of those being destroyed.

== Geography ==
According to the United States Census Bureau, the city has a total area of 9.4 square miles (24 km^{2}), of which 9.3 square miles (24 km^{2}) is land and 0.04 square miles (0.10 km^{2}) (0.32%) is water. The city is located along Interstate 75, which runs to the west of downtown, with access from exits 76 and 77. Via I-75, Lexington is 40 mi (64 km) north, and Knoxville, Tennessee is 134 mi (216 km) south. U.S. Route 25 is the main highway through the center of city, leading north 14 mi (23 km) to Richmond, the Madison County seat, and south 17 mi (27 km) to Mount Vernon. Kentucky Route 21 also runs through the city as well, leading east 6 mi (9.7 km) to Bighill and northwest 10 mi (16 km) to Paint Lick.

Berea is located on the border of the Cumberland Plateau. The area has a mountainous appearance, but most outcroppings in the area have a maximum elevation of 2,500 feet or 760 metres.

=== Climate ===
Berea has a humid subtropical climate, with hot summers and relatively cold winters. Summers tend to be humid and sunny, with occasional storms, while winters are generally cold with many milder periods.

Climate data for Berea, Kentucky
Month	Jan	Feb	Mar	Apr	May	Jun	Jul	Aug	Sep	Oct	Nov	Dec	Year
Record high °F (°C)	77 (25)	80 (27)	85 (29)	90 (32)	92 (33)	98 (37)	104 (40)	102 (39)	104 (40)	93 (34)	82 (28)	78 (26)	104 (40)
Mean daily maximum °F (°C)	45 (7)	50 (10)	60 (16)	70 (21)	77 (25)	85 (29)	87 (31)	87 (31)	80 (27)	69 (21)	58 (14)	47 (8)	68 (20)
Mean daily minimum °F (°C)	28 (−2)	31 (−1)	38 (3)	47 (8)	56 (13)	64 (18)	67 (19)	66 (19)	59 (15)	49 (9)	41 (5)	31 (−1)	48 (9)
Record low °F (°C)	−21 (−29)	−10 (−23)	−3 (−19)	21 (−6)	27 (−3)	39 (4)	47 (8)	42 (6)	31 (−1)	22 (−6)	−3 (−19)	−17 (−27)	−21 (−29)
Average precipitation inches (mm)	2.91 (74)	3.56 (90)	4.11 (104)	3.71 (94)	5.26 (134)	4.65 (118)	4.74 (120)	3.58 (91)	3.58 (91)	3.29 (84)	3.81 (97)	4.09 (104)	47.29 (1,201)
Source: The Weather Channel.

== Demographics ==
Historical population
Census	Pop.	Note	%±
1880	580		—
1900	762		—
1910	1,510		98.2%
1920	1,640		8.6%
1930	1,827		11.4%
1940	2,176		19.1%
1950	3,372		55.0%
1960	4,302		27.6%
1970	6,956		61.7%
1980	8,226		18.3%
1990	9,126		10.9%
2000	9,851		7.9%
2010	13,561		37.7%
2020	15,539		14.6%
2024 (est.)	16,436		5.8%
U.S. Decennial Census

=== 2020 census ===
As of the 2020 census, Berea had a population of 15,539. The median age was 33.5 years. 21.5% of residents were under the age of 18 and 15.1% of residents were 65 years of age or older. For every 100 females there were 88.2 males, and for every 100 females age 18 and over there were 84.1 males age 18 and over.

92.6% of residents lived in urban areas, while 7.4% lived in rural areas.

There were 5,938 households in Berea, of which 31.3% had children under the age of 18 living in them. Of all households, 43.3% were married-couple households, 17.3% were households with a male householder and no spouse or partner present, and 31.6% were households with a female householder and no spouse or partner present. About 29.5% of all households were made up of individuals and 11.7% had someone living alone who was 65 years of age or older.

There were 6,449 housing units, of which 7.9% were vacant. The homeowner vacancy rate was 1.8% and the rental vacancy rate was 7.8%.

Racial composition as of the 2020 census
Race	Number	Percent
White	13,514	87.0%
Black or African American	677	4.4%
American Indian and Alaska Native	47	0.3%
Asian	191	1.2%
Native Hawaiian and Other Pacific Islander	16	0.1%
Some other race	214	1.4%
Two or more races	880	5.7%
Hispanic or Latino (of any race)	624	4.0%

=== 2010 census ===
At the 2010 census, there were 13,561 people, 5,119 households and 3,382 families residing in the city. The population density was 1,458.2 inhabitants per square mile (563.0/km^{2}). There were 5,633 housing units at an average density of 612.3 per square mile (236.4/km^{2}). The racial makeup of the city was 90.7% White, 4.00% African American, 0.5% Native American, 1.2 percent Asian, 0.1% Pacific Islander, 0.9% from other races, and 2.6% from two or more races. Hispanics or Latinos of any race were 2.7% of the population.

There were 5,119 households, of which 31.2% had children under the age of 18 living with them. 47.1% were married couples living together, 4.5% had a male householder with no wife present, 14.4% had a female householder with no husband present, and 33.9% were non-families. 28.9% of all households were made up of individuals, and 22.9% had someone living alone who was 65 years of age or older. The average household size was 2.39 and the average family size was 2.92.

The age distribution was 22.7% under the age of 18, 8.6% from 18 to 21, 53.2% from 21 to 62, 2.8% from 62 to 65, and 12.7% who were 65 years of age or older. The median age was 32.4 years. The population was 53.4% female and 46.6% male (81 males per 100 females).

The median household income was $38,333 and the median family income was $45,541. Males had a median income of $28,304 compared $12,163 for females. The per capita income for the city was $18,003. About 27.0% of the population were below the poverty line, including 39.6% of those under age 18 and 7.0% of those age 65 or over.

== Economy ==
In July 2023, Hitachi Astemo Americas Inc., announced it will expand its existing automotive manufacturing operations in Berea, with a new $153 million investment, creating 167 new full-time jobs.
In September 2026, Astemo announced that it will initially invest more than $112 million in its Berea operations, creating 114 jobs, primarily to increase production of hybrid/EV powertrain components. The potential full scope is $379 million, and up to 282 jobs, which would make it the largest private-sector investment in Madison County in roughly 20 years.

== Education ==
Berea's school district is known as Berea Independent Schools, which is distinct from the surrounding Madison County School District.

Prior to the 1960s, the city featured schools from both the Berea Independent Schools district, which at that point included Berea Elementary School and Berea High School, and the Berea College-owned schools of Knapp Hall and Berea Foundation School. These high schools were all consolidated into Berea Community High School, under Berea Independent Schools, which opened for the 1969–1970.

Berea has a lending library, a branch of the Madison County Public Library.

== Arts and culture ==
Due to the high number of arts and crafts produced, Berea is a tourist attraction. It hosts several crafts festivals throughout the year. Berea also hosts a Spoonbread Festival in mid-September, which features a cornmeal bread traditionally served with a wooden spoon. The annual Berea College Celebration of Traditional Music, started in 1974, takes place in mid-October and features traditional music as passed down by people in the Appalachian region.

== Transportation ==
Foothills Express, operated by the Kentucky River Foothills Development Council, provides the Berea Bus Service bus service within Berea, Madison County Connector service to Richmond, and local and intercity demand-responsive transport.

== Notable people ==
- Sue Draheim, fiddler, lived in Berea in her later years until her death in 2013.
- John Gregg Fee (1816–1901), minister, abolitionist, founder of Berea College
- John Fenn, recipient of 2002 Nobel Prize in Chemistry; grew up in Berea.
- Red Foley, singer, musician, and radio and TV personality; raised in Berea and graduated from Berea High School.
- Damien Harris, college football player at the University of Alabama; graduated from Madison Southern High School, former running back for the New England Patriots and Buffalo Bills.
- bell hooks, author, radical feminist, and social activist; lived in Berea until her death in 2021.
- Silas House, writer and novelist lives in Berea.
- Louise Gilman Hutchins (1911–1996), pediatrician and president of Berea's Mountain Maternal Health League.
- Ashley Judd, actress, humanitarian and political activist; briefly lived and attended school in Berea
- Naomi Judd, country music singer; briefly lived in Berea.
- Wynonna Judd, country music singer; briefly lived and attended school in Berea.
- Lily May Ledford, banjo player, member of the Coon Creek Girls; lived in Berea and is buried in the Berea cemetery.
- J.P. Pennington, musician, son of Lily May Ledford; born in Berea.
- Jean Ritchie, musician, "Mother of Folk"; resided in Berea until her death in 2015.
- Anne Shelby, children's book writer; born in Berea
- Tony Snow, former White House press secretary; born in Berea.
- Luke Stocker, NFL player, tight end, Tampa Bay Buccaneers, Tennessee Titans, Atlanta Falcons, Minnesota Vikings; graduated from Madison Southern High School.

== See also ==
- Bobtown, Kentucky, a nearby hamlet
