= Country Dance =

A country dance is a social dance form in which two or more couples dance together in a set.

Country Dance may also refer to:

- Country–western dance, dances performed to country music in the United States
- Country Dance (film), a 1970 British drama film
- The Country Dance, a painting by Jean-Antoine Watteau
- "Country Dance", a 2023 song by Aaron Goodvin

== See also ==
- Scottish country dance, the distinctively Scottish form of country dance
- Country Dance and Song Society
