= Mary Carr (disambiguation) =

Mary Carr may refer to:

- Mary Carr (1874–1973), American actress
- Mary Carr Moore (1873–1957), American composer and teacher
