= CDSS =

CDSS may refer to:

- Centre for Defence and Strategic Studies at the Australian Defence College
- Clinical decision support system
- California Department of Social Services
- Country Dance and Song Society, a nonprofit organization that seeks to promote participatory dance, music, and song with English and North American roots
