= Sarah Carr =

Sarah Carr may refer to:

- Sarah Pratt Carr (1850–1935), American minister and writer
- Sarah Carr (politician), British Liberal Democrat politician who stood as a candidate for Hereford and South Herefordshire at the 2010 general election
- Sally Carr, born Sarah Cecilia Carr, lead singer of the 1970s pop group Middle of the Road
- Sarah E. Kellogg (1870–1957), née Carr, American politician, postmaster, and real estate agent

== See also ==
- Carr (surname)
