= May Gadd =

American folk dance leader

May Gadd was an internationally known expert on American and English country dance. Gadd was born in Chichester, England in 1890. She became a physical education instructor but after seeing a dance in a London theatre, attended Cecil Sharp's summer camp in 1915.

== Career ==
Gadd came to the United States in 1927 to work with the New York branch of the English Folk Dance Society in New York City. She transformed it into the Country Dance and Song Society and was appointed as the society's first national director. She worked for the society for 46 years, retiring in 1973. Under her leadership, the society expanded to more than 80 chapters across the U.S. and established Pinewoods Camp in Plymouth, Massachusetts. Gadd was also the editor of the society's The Country Dancer magazine and in 1938 helped to establish the Christmas Country Dance School at Berea College.

Gadd assisted Agnes de Mille in choreographing shows and ballets including the 1943 premiere of Oklahoma! and Brigadoon. In 1951 she authored the book Country Dances of Today. She received the Gold Badge Award from the English Folk Dance and Song Society in 1961.

Her students included dance writer and caller Bob Dalsemer. She continued dancing and teaching until 1976 and died January 27, 1979, at the age of 89. CDSS established an endowment fund in her name.
