= Bob Dalsemer =

American folk singer and dance leader

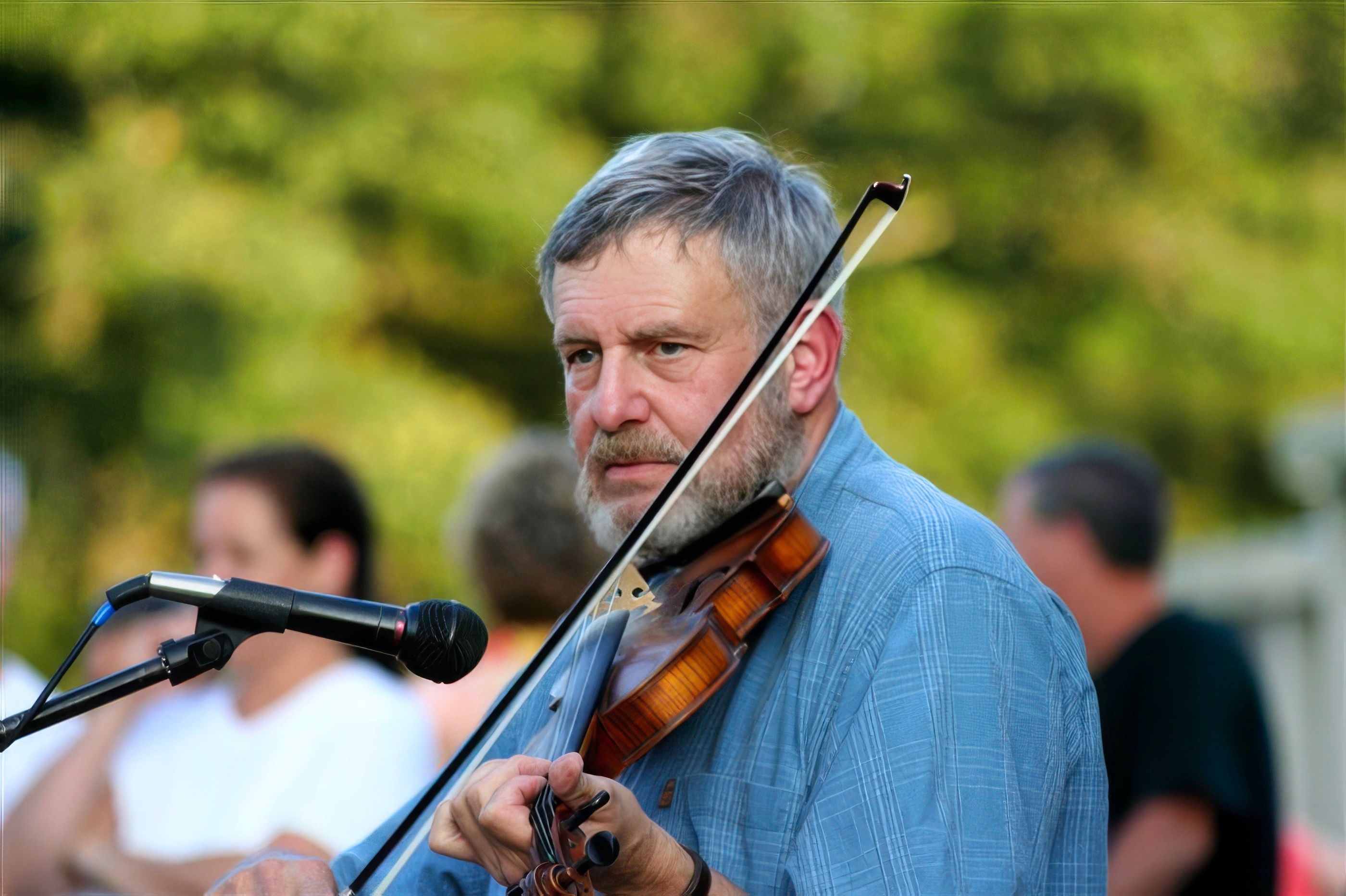

Background information
- Birth name: Robert G. Dalsemer
- Born: October 18, 1943 (age 81); Baltimore, US
- Genres: Folk
- Occupation(s): Musician, singer, folk dance caller/writer
- Instrument(s): Vocals, fiddle, guitar, mandolin, and piano accordion
- Years active: 1971–present
- Website: http://www.bobdalsemer.com/

Bob Dalsemer (born 1943) is a square and contra dance writer and caller. He has called dances for more than 50 years and in more than 33 states, plus internationally in Canada, the Czech Republic, Britain, Belgium, Denmark and Russia. He began writing dances in the mid-1970s. He wrote the book West Virginia Square Dances (CDSS, 1982) and Folk Dance Fun for Schools and Families (John C. Campbell Folk School, 1995). He has also compiled the cassette/book compilations Smoke On the Water: Square Dance Classics and When The Work's All Done: A Square Dance Party For Beginners and Old Hands.

== Career ==
Dalsemer was born and raised in Baltimore. He studied dance under May Gadd and co-founded the Baltimore Folk Music Society. He served as president of the Country Dance and Song Society from 1990 to 1996. He was honored with the society’s Lifetime Contribution Award in 2011.

In 1991, Dalsemer became Music and Dance Coordinator at the John C. Campbell Folk School. While there, he developed the Folk School's first website and launched the weeklong dance caller and musician courses. He retired from the Folk School in April 2013.

Dalsemer was principal caller for the Mountain Folk Festival at Berea College from 2000 to 2015.

== Personal life ==
In 2014 he underwent quadruple bypass surgery. In December 2020, he moved to Black Mountain, North Carolina. The following year he was diagnosed with pulmonary fibrosis.

== See also ==
- Callerlab, the International Association of Square Dance Callers
- Square dance program
