= William Benton Overstreet =

American songwriter and pianist (1888–1935)

William Benton Overstreet (April 3, 1888 – June 23, 1935) was an American songwriter, bandleader and pianist in the early twentieth century.

== Biography ==
Overstreet was born in Atchison, Kansas. He directed McCabe's Georgia Troubadours in 1910, and by the mid-1910s was working in Kansas City, Missouri, directing the Lyric Theatre Orchestra. A prominent bandleader of the period, he also ran a group backing the "Rag Shouters" with singer Estelle Morris in Chicago. By that time, he was using the word "jass" to describe his music. He worked at the Grand Theatre in Chicago between 1916 and 1922, and then worked in Harlem and in touring shows in the 1920s.

As a songwriter, Overstreet was rated by Langston Hughes as one of the "better poets of jazz". He wrote the tune "The 'Jazz' Dance" (or "That 'Jazz' Dance"), published by Will Rossiter in 1917, and recorded by W. C. Handy's Orchestra the same year, the first known occurrence of the word in a song title. He also collaborated on songs with James "Slap Rag" White, and with Billy Higgins, with whom he composed the hit song "There'll Be Some Changes Made", published in 1921 and first recorded by Ethel Waters. The song was widely recorded, by Marion Harris, Fats Waller, Benny Goodman, Bob Wills, Peggy Lee, Billie Holiday, and others.

Overstreet was working as a music teacher in Milwaukee, Wisconsin, in 1930, and continued to make recordings as a piano accompanist into the early 1930s.

He died on June 23, 1935, in New York.
