= Wade H. Hammond =

American conductor and political organizer (1879–1957)

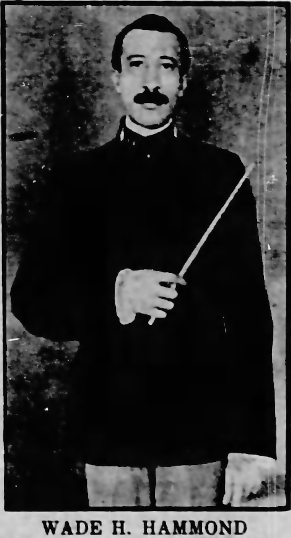
Wade H. Hammond, circa 1911

Wade H. Hammond (1879–January 15, 1957), born in Huntsville, Alabama, was an American musician who became one of the first African American bandmasters in the United States military in 1909, (Note: Some contemporary news articles report the year as 1908) for the 9th Cavalry. Hammond enlisted in the service during the Spanish-American War (c. 1898), where he was the bandmaster for the 3rd Alabama Volunteer Infantry Regiment. Hammond’s military career extended from the Spanish American War to World War I, and the beginning of World War II.

Hammond served as bandmaster of Alabama A&M College in Normal, Alabama, and was a band instructor for two years at Western University in Quindaro, Kansas before being appointed to the 9th Cavalry band, by order of President Theodore Roosevelt. Bishop William Tecumseh Vernon, president of Western University and Register of the Treasury, successfully lobbied for Hammond's appointment to the 9th Cavalry band. Hammond has been widely praised for his accomplishments as a bandmaster.

== Early life and education ==
Hammond was born in 1879 in Huntsville, Alabama, to parents Calib and Sarah Hammond. His father was a farmer, and his mother was a housekeeper. Hammond graduated in 1895 from Alabama A&M College, with a Bachelor of Arts degree. He also briefly attended Kittrell College in Kittrell, North Carolina, leaving the school in 1898 to enlist in the Army at the outbreak of the Spanish American War. His wife Leah née Fitzgerald, was a graduate of Kittrell College. Her father was the first African American to build and operate a textile mill in the United States. The couple were married in 1899, and had one daughter born in 1911.

Prior to his appointment to the 9th Cavalry, he was a band instructor at Western University in Quindaro, Kansas, where he also taught tailoring. In December 1912, he took an extended leave of absence from the military, and traveled abroad to study for six months at the Royal Military School of Music in London, England. The funds for his travel and studies were raised by the 9th Cavalry. The Argonaut opined at the time that his acceptance to the British Military School was "unparalleled in the history of Army Bands of either race and the more remarkable that the recipient of the honor is a Negro."

== Bandmaster career ==
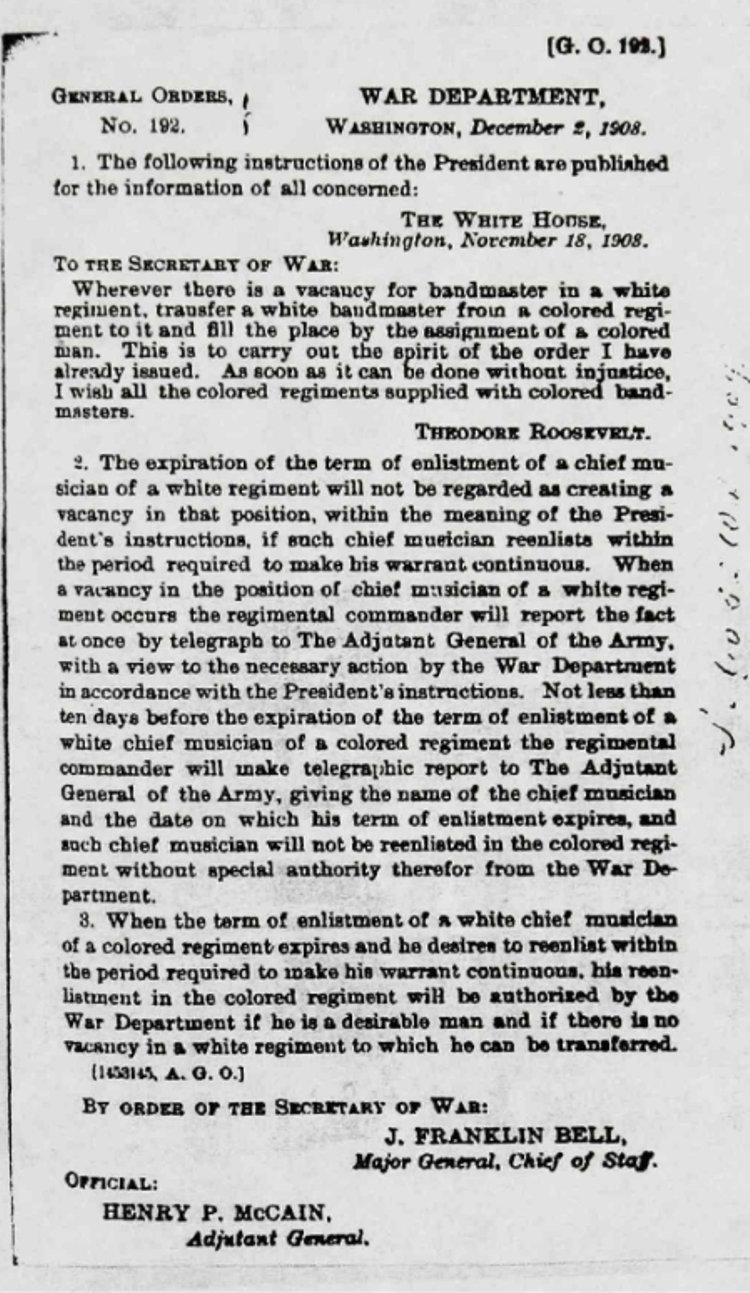
1908 War Department General Order No. 192 by President Theodore Roosevelt

The 9th Cavalry was one of the first military units of the United States Army that was designated for Black enlisted men. There were six Black regiments in total that came about as an act of Congress in July 1866. Colonel Edward Hatch was the 9th’s first commander.

By 1909, Hammond was appointed Chief Musician for the 9th Cavalry by a special order of President Theodore Roosevelt. The order directed that White bandmasters of Black regiments be transferred to White regiments, and their replacements should be Black bandmasters. Hammond's salary for Chief Musician was $75 a month, equivalent to $2,687 in 2025. In 1909, the 9th Cavalry was stationed at Fort D. A. Russell, Cheyenne, Wyoming.

In 1911, tensions started to flare along the southern border between the United States and Mexico, and in 1912, the 9th Cavalry was sent to Camp Harry J. Jones, near Douglas, Arizona. Hammond remained there until 1922, when he was appointed Chief Musician to the 10th Cavalry Regiment at Fort Huachuca, Arizona. The fort was the base for the Buffalo Soldiers of the 10th Cavalry. In 1925, Hammond took a temporary leave of absence and traveled to the Tuskegee Institute, a private, historically black university in Tuskegee, Alabama, to instruct the 50 piece Tuskegee Band.

By 1934, Hammond had been appointed as Chief Musician of the 25th Infantry Regiment. In 1935, Hammond and his band traveled to San Diego, California for a ten day engagement at the California Pacific International Exposition. Hammond remained with the 25th Regiment until his retirement in 1942.

== Reception ==
In 1915, The Topeka Plaindealer, said of the 9th Calvary band under Hammond's direction; "competent critics pronounce the organization a marvel in tone, tune, balance, precision and technique, these accomplishments contributing in a large measure to the intelligent rendition of the fine classical programs for which this organization is noted".

The Denver Star wrote in 1915: "Hammond's rare native ability, supplemented by the best American and European training, eminently fits him for his regimental duties, while his thoroughness and skill as a conductor of the masterworks entitle him to a place as a bandmaster of the first rank."

After a performance for the community of Douglas, Arizona in 1915, the mayor of Douglas went on stage and presented a diamond encrusted gold medal to Hammond, for the "excellent work he accomplished with his organization."

Hammond and his band played popular music of the era, including classical tunes and patriotic songs, but was reluctant to play Ragtime music. He was quoted saying:

Ragtime is popular, but that is not enough justification for an army band. A ragtime selection is all right now and then for an encore, but that is as far as I care to go. We feel it is the duty of a United States Army band to furnish the public really good music, and to try to educate the public taste rather than destroy it.

== Retirement in Arizona ==
Hammond moved to Phoenix in 1942, after serving 35 years in the U.S. Army. He became a prominent civic leader in Phoenix's African American community. Hammond organized the Urban League of Phoenix, Arizona, and became a member of the National Association of Housing Officials and the Phoenix Housing Authority. Hammond was the first African American to be appointed to the Housing Authority Board, and never took any pay for his work with the board.

He was instrumental in reorganizing the Black Soldiers Center in Phoenix so that Black soldiers could have more of the services that other soldiers were receiving. He also established the first band at Phoenix's Carver High School in 1945, where he instructed the students for free until a band director was hired.

Hammond died at his home in Phoenix in 1957.

== See also ==
- Buffalo Soldier
- Military history of African Americans

== Sources ==
- Southern, Eileen (1997) [1971]. The Music of Black Americans: A History. New York: W.W. Norton & Co. ISBN 0393038432.
