= The Country Dance =

Painting by Antoine Watteau

- La Danse Champetre (French)
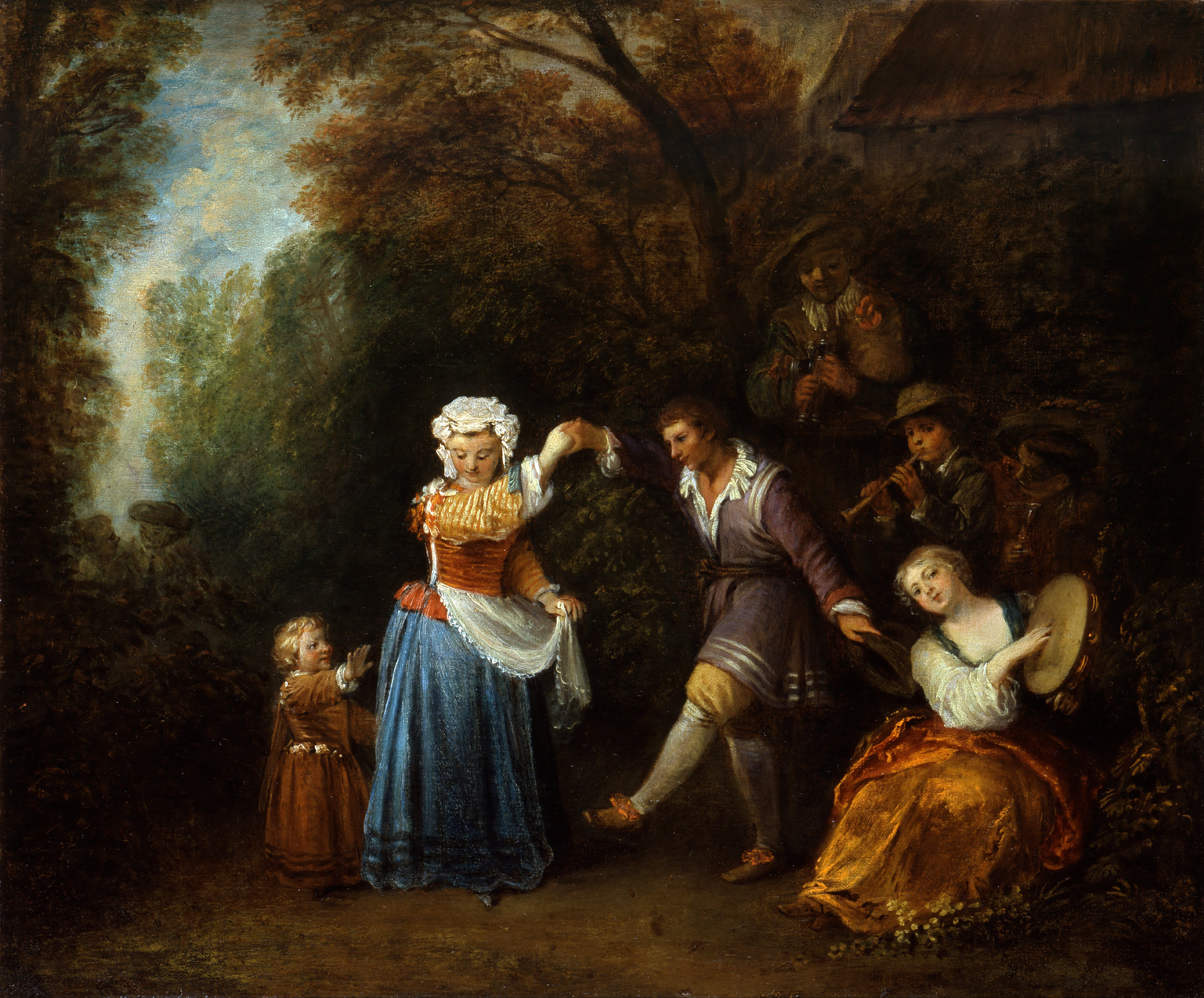
- Artist: Jean-Antoine Watteau
- Year: c. 1706-1710
- Type: Oil painting on canvas
- Dimensions: 50 cm × 60.01 cm (19.5 in × 23.625 in)
- Location: Indianapolis Museum of Art, Indianapolis
- Accession: 74.98

The Country Dance is an oil painting by French artist Jean-Antoine Watteau, located in the Indianapolis Museum of Art, which is in Indianapolis, Indiana. Probably one of Watteau's earliest painting, created roughly 1706-1710, it depicts a group of quite courtly peasants dancing among the trees.

== Description ==
Amid the trees, a group of villagers play music while a couple dances. A toddler copies the lady's motions, entertaining the company. Rather than the usual contemporary association with debauchery, music here alludes to social harmony and order. The musicians glance coyly at the viewer, actors very aware of their spectators. This sort of interaction is one of Watteau's hallmarks.

It is an image of visual extremes: the dark forest background brings the peasants' bright clothing into sharp contrast. The rustic setting and the dancers' formal attire channel both the fête galante and a formal court celebration in the countryside.

== Historical information ==
This is Watteau's earliest known painting, but already he had developed his own style. Painted shortly after he moved from Valenciennes to Paris, Watteau took the merry rustic scenes favored by his Flemish antecedents like Pieter Bruegel and Peter Paul Rubens, but gave them unprecedented grace, nobility, and style. Though painting a standard northern European subject, he drew heavily on Venetian landscapes, particularly in the atmospheric effects. It is, in effect, a declaration in favor of the Rococo movement with which Watteau would become so heavily associated.

=== Acquisition ===
The Country Dance was acquired by the IMA in 1974, a gift of Mrs. Herman C. Krannert. It hangs in the Charles O. McGaughey Gallery and has the accession number 74.98.

== See also ==
- The Embarkation for Cythera
