= Buddy Gilmore =

US jazz drummer (deceased)

Buddy Gilmore, sometimes spelled Buddie Gilmore, (born 1880) was a jazz drummer. He deployed a greatly expanded drum kit as part of his vaudeville performances and was a showman as part of popular orchestras. The Prince of Wales took lessons from him and performed with him.

He was born in North Carolina.

Victor Talking Machine Company recorded him as part of the Europe's Society Orchestra performing "Castle House Rag".

The Whitney Museum of American Art has a photograph of him. John Gutmann painted a portrait of him in 1925.
