= Pinewoods Camp =

Traditional dance and music camp in Plymouth, Massachusetts, United States

- U.S. National Register of Historic Places
- U.S. Historic district
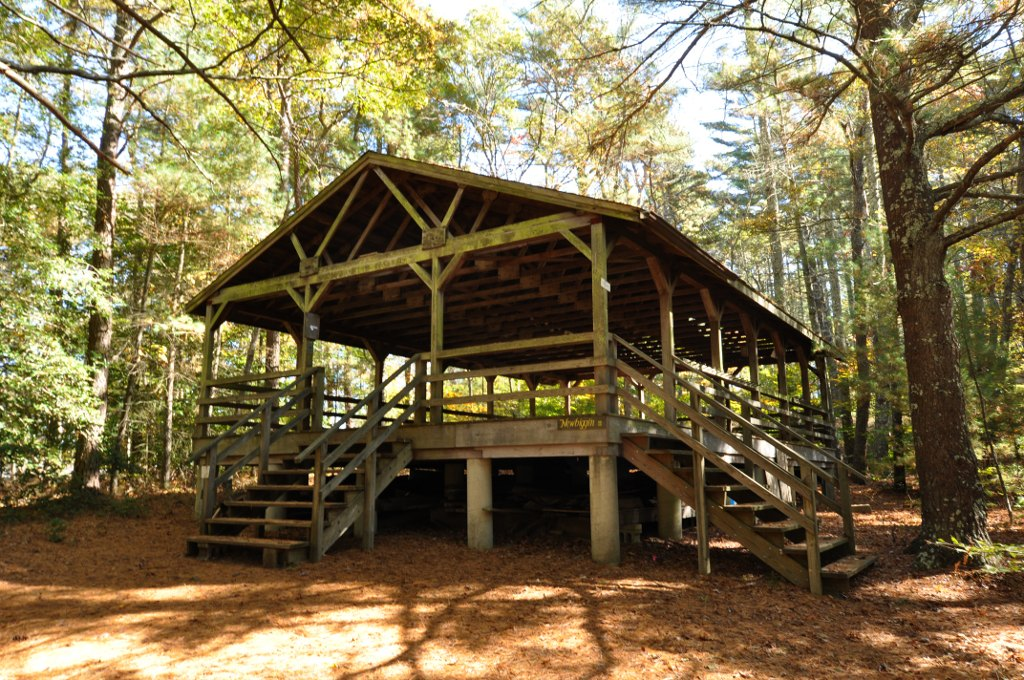
- Newbiggin dance pavilion at Pinewoods

- Location within Massachusetts Location within the United States
- Location: 80 Cornish Field Rd., Plymouth, Massachusetts
- Coordinates: 41°51′16″N 70°36′15″W
- Area: 32 acres (13 ha)
- Built: 1919
- Built by: Raymond Bros.
- Architectural style: Bungalow/craftsman
- NRHP reference No.: 09001151
- Added to NRHP: December 16, 2009

Pinewoods Camp is a traditional dance and music camp located on 31 acres (13 ha) of woodland between Long Pond and Round Pond in Plymouth, Massachusetts. It is the oldest continuously run folk dance camp in the U.S., and is arguably the most popular and well-known camp of its type.

== History ==
Initially known as "Pine Tree Camp", Pinewoods was founded in 1919 by Helen Osborne Storrow as the first National Girl Scout Leadership Training School. In 1933, the facility was converted for use as a dance camp. The name was changed to Pinewoods Camp in 1935. Storrow died in 1944, and left the property to Lily and Rick Conant, who operated the property until 1976. At that time, the Conants transferred its ownership to a newly created nonprofit organization, Pinewoods Camp, Inc., that now runs the facility. Pinewoods was added to the National Register of Historic Places in 2009.

== Activities ==
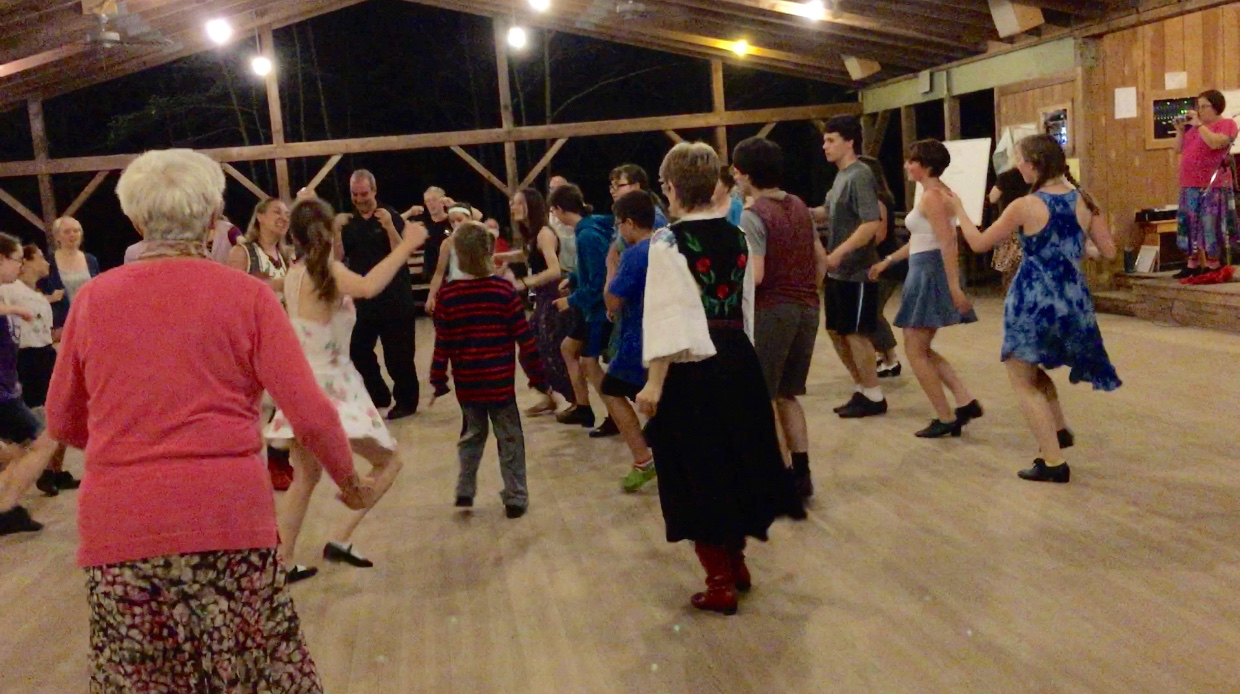
Romanian dance instructors Sonia Dion and Cristian Florescu review a dance in pavilion C# during the Folk Arts Center of New England session in 2015.

Each summer, Pinewoods Camp hosts over a dozen sessions, some of which are a week long, and others of which take place over a weekend. Each session features music and dancing educational programs for adults and is run by one of five Program Providers:

- The Country Dance and Song Society
- The Country Dance Society, Boston Centre
- The Folk Arts Center of New England
- The Folk Music Society of New York
- Royal Scottish Country Dance Society, Boston Branch

Pinewoods has played a central role in the development of country dance traditions in the United States.

== Grounds and facilities ==
Pinewoods's facilities include four open-sided dance pavilions (Hands Across, Pine Hollow, Ampleforth and Newbiggin), (Note: "Hands Across" and "Pine Hollow" were originally named "C#" and "C# Minor" respectively, references to Cecil Sharp. In 2023, the names were changed due to concerns about Sharp's legacy.) a dining hall and kitchen, a camp house, and rustic cabins for up to 140 campers (plus offices, staff housing, and support facilities). Three of the pavilions and the dining hall were renovated as part of a recent capital campaign and are handicapped accessible, although some other facilities are not.

Pinewoods grounds

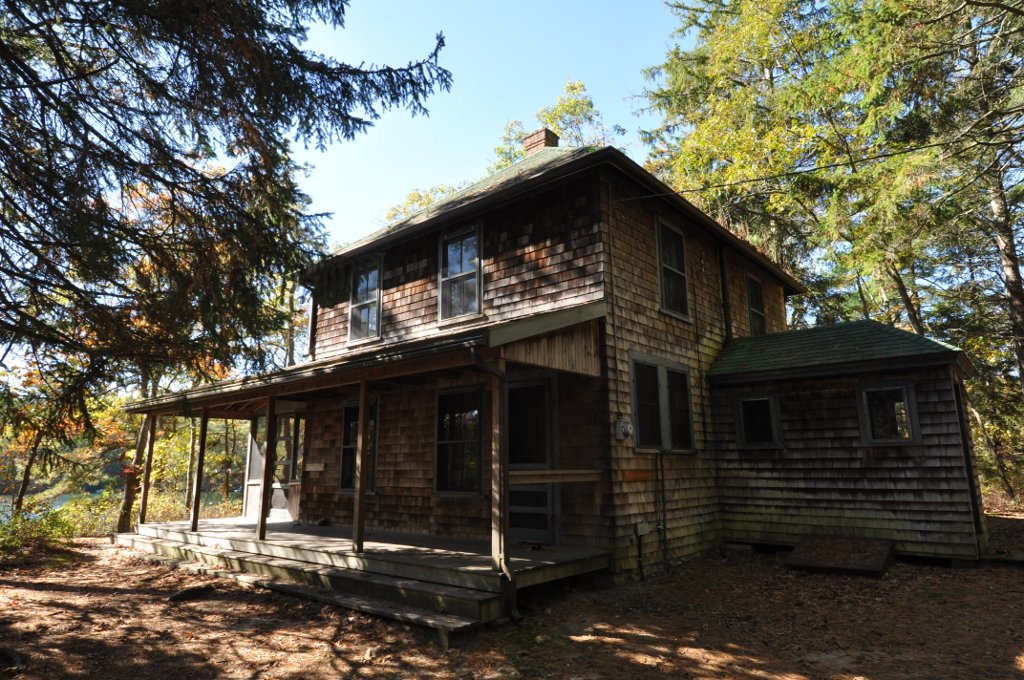
Hunsdon House, a house with several rooms for campers

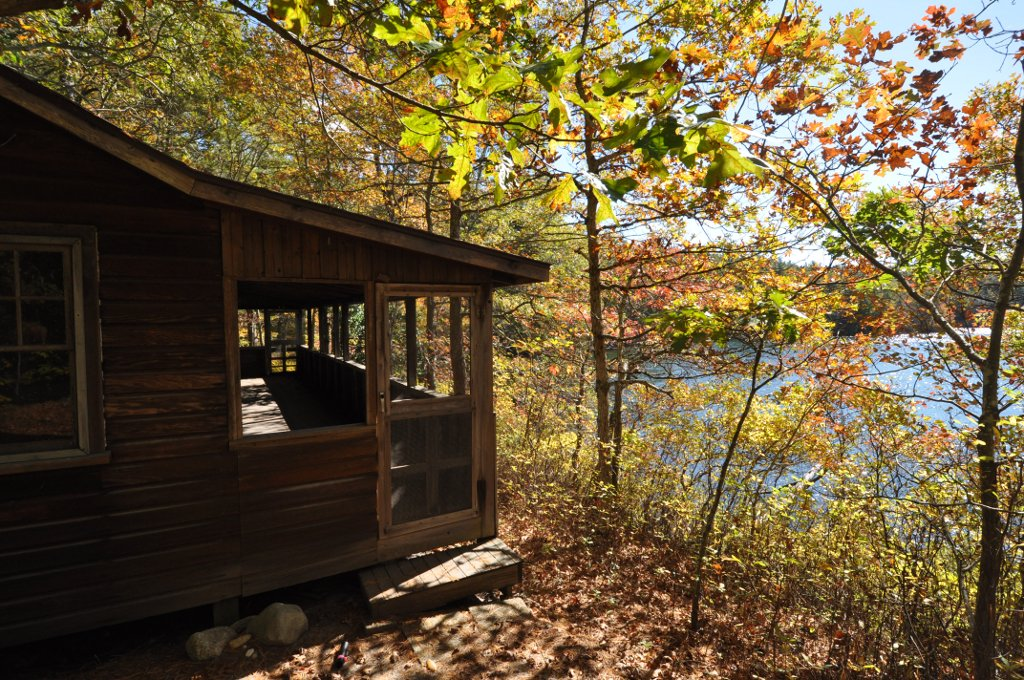
Nonesuch, a cabin on the shore of Round Pond

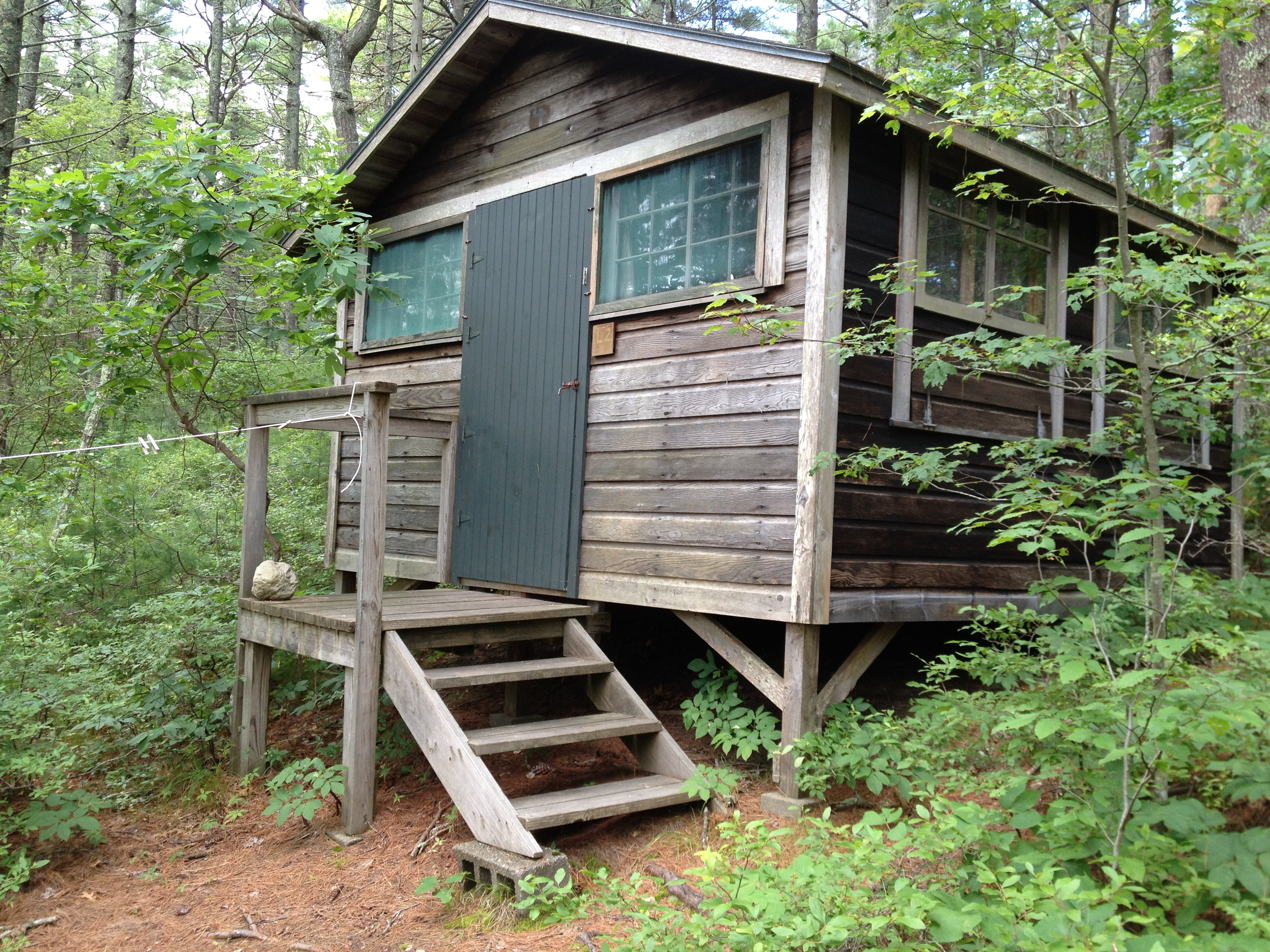
Lads 2, a two-person cabin

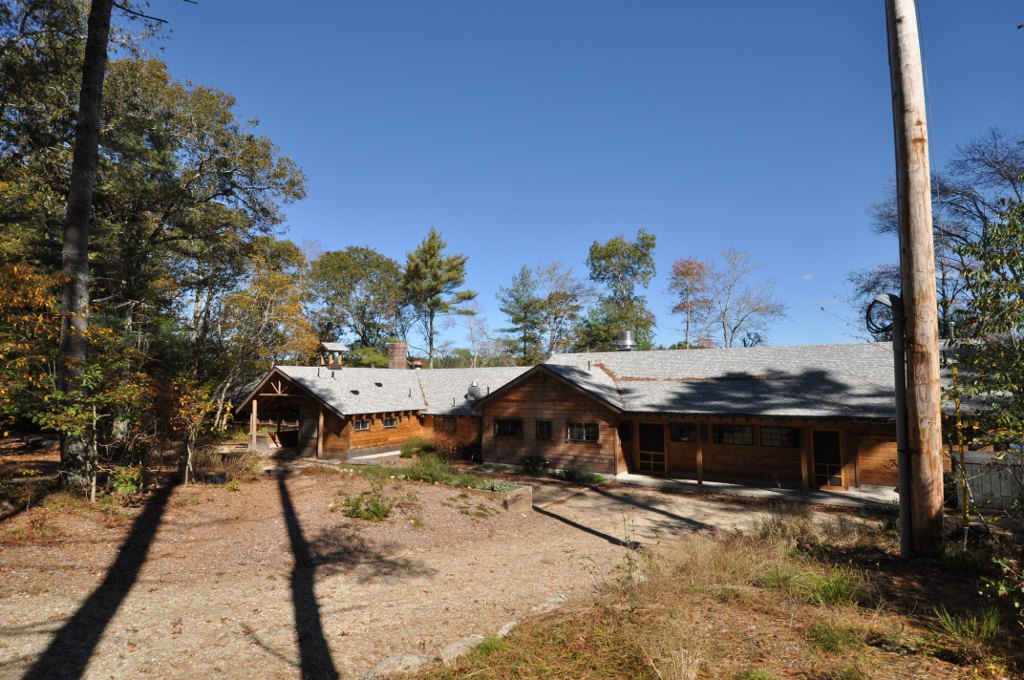
Dining hall and kitchen

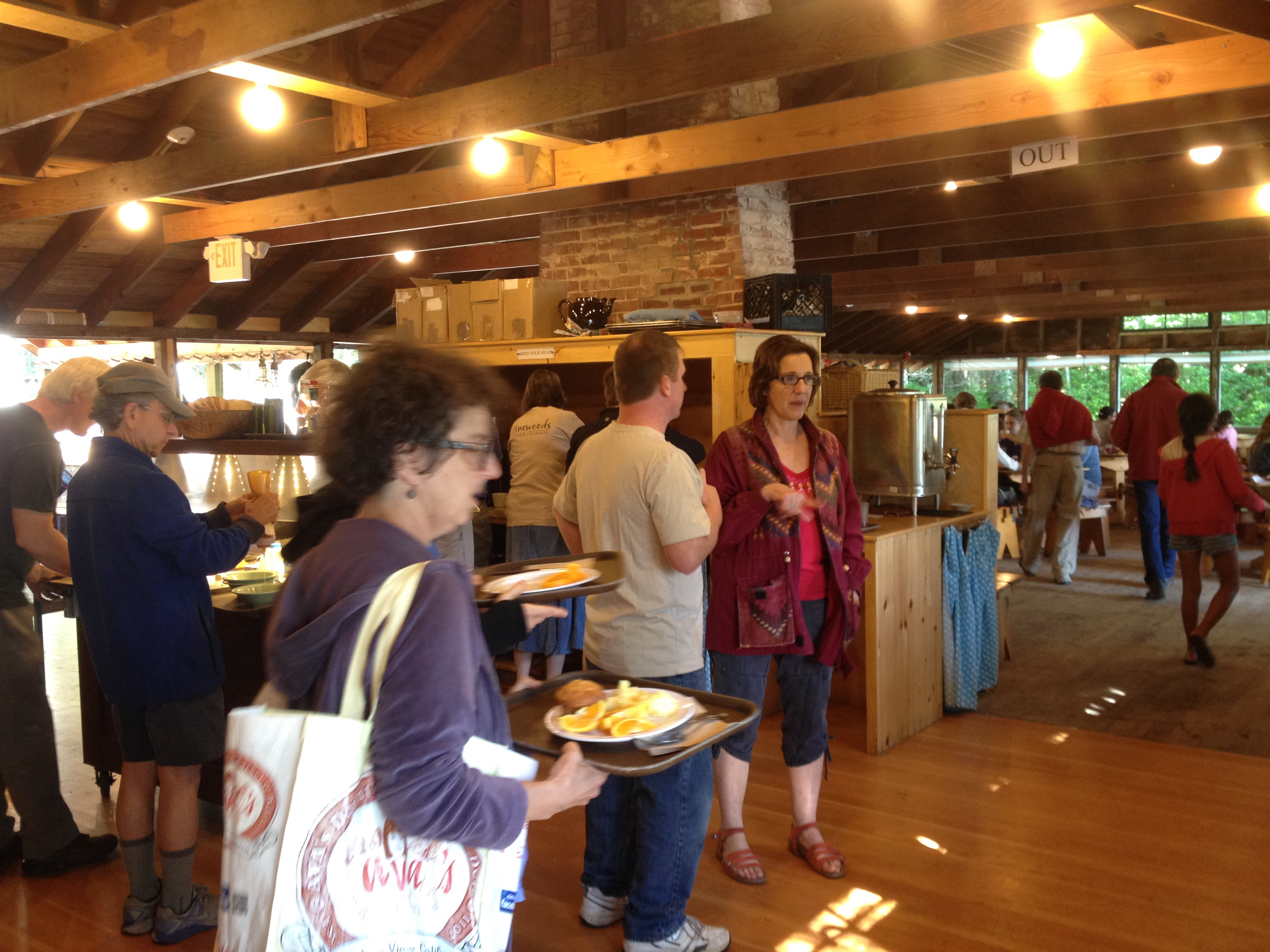
Serving area in dining hall

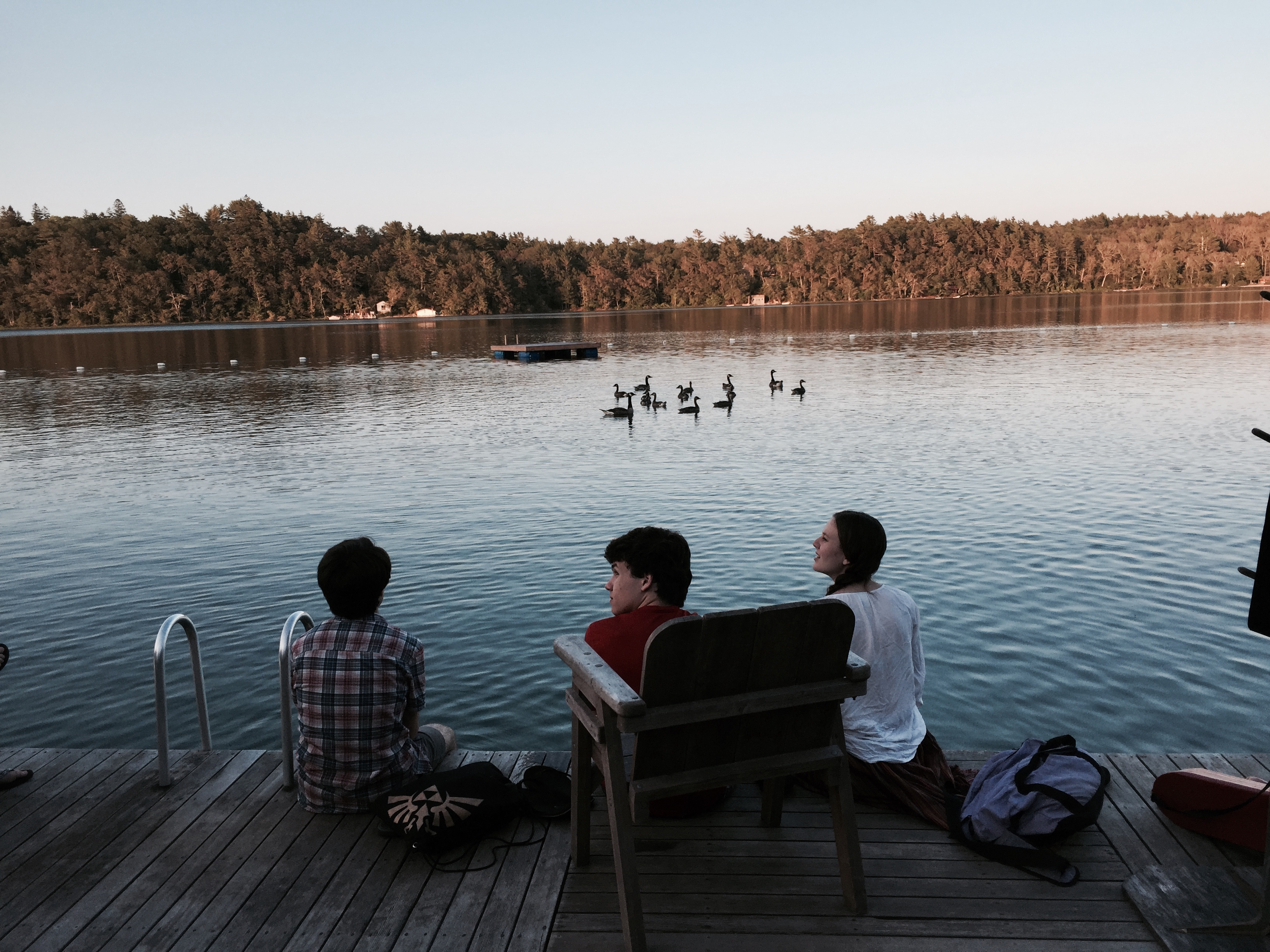
Ducks invade the swimming area on Long Pond

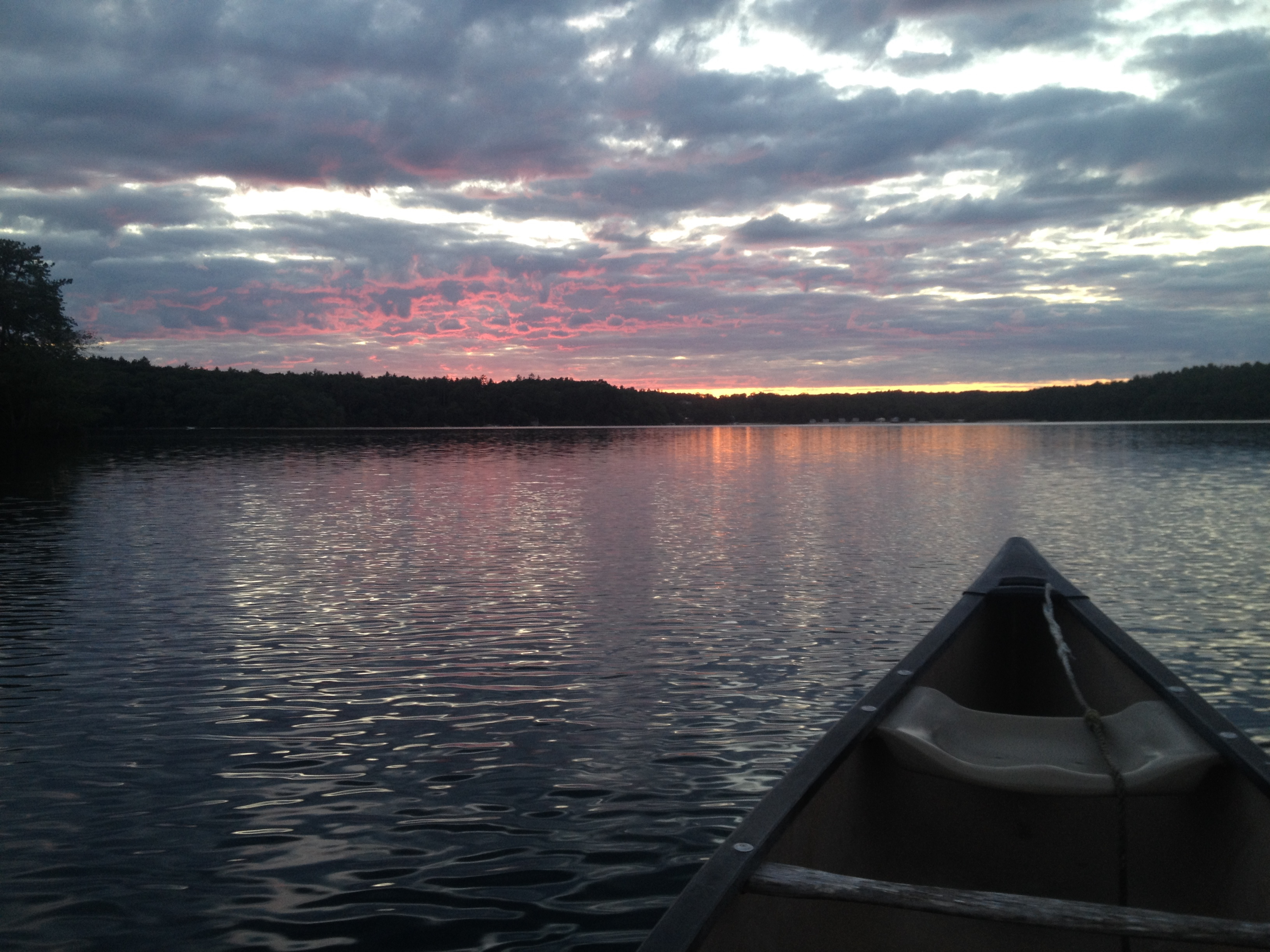
Sunset on Long Pond

== See also ==
- Country dance
- Contra dance
- Folk music
- International folk dance
