= Sarah Pratt Carr =

American minister and writer (1850–1935)

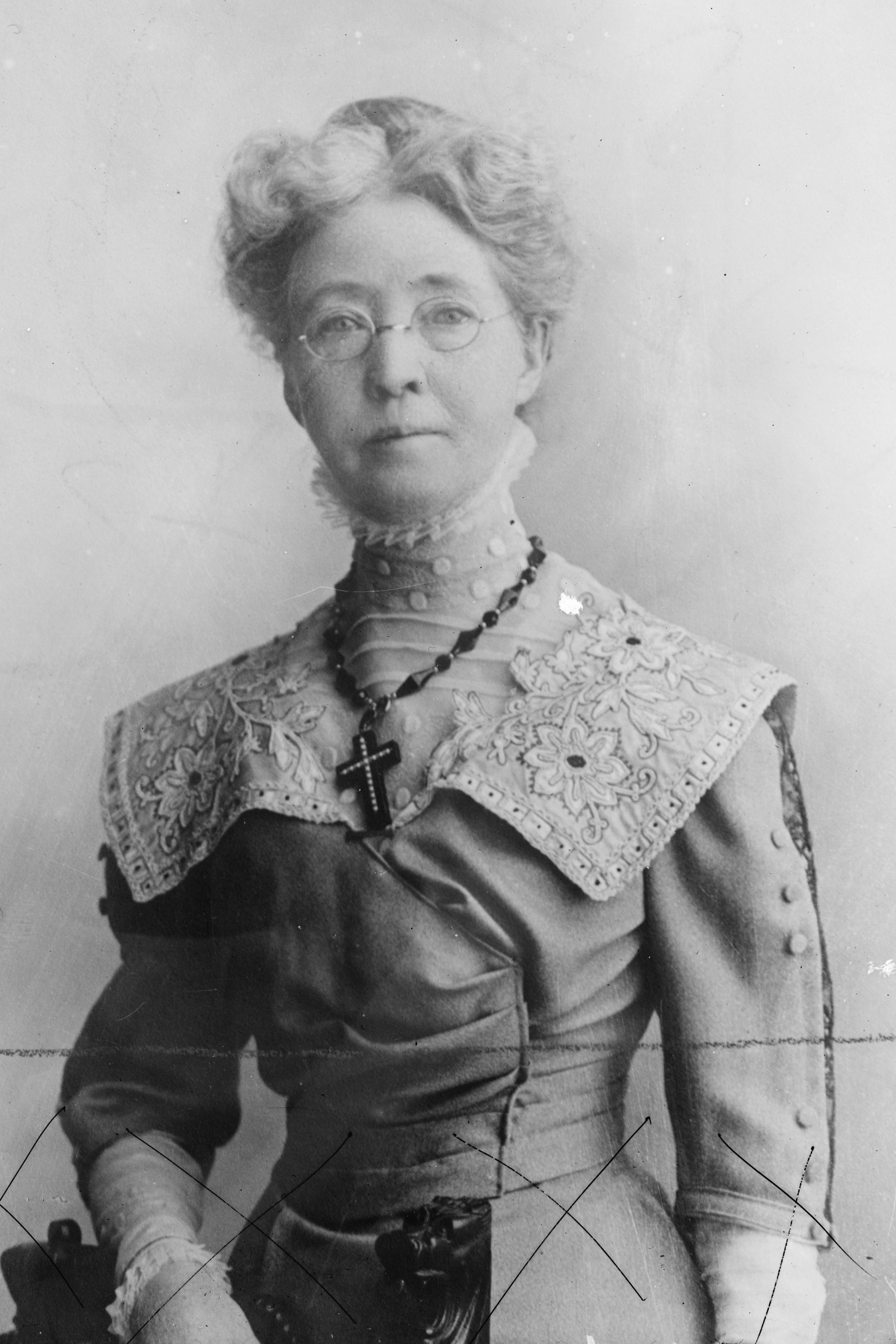
- Undated photograph of Sarah Pratt Carr
- Born: July 17, 1850; Freeport
- Died: December 24, 1935; Los Angeles
- Children: Mary Carr Moore

Sarah Amelia Pratt Carr (July 17, 1850 – December 24, 1935) was an American minister and writer.

Sarah Amelia Pratt was born on July 17, 1850, in Freeport, Maine, to Louisa (Merrill) and Robert Henry Pratt. Sarah married Byron Oscar Carr in Carlin, Nevada, on February 15, 1872. She was ordained as a Unitarian minister in Lemoore, California, on April 24, 1896, and worked as a missionary in California thereafter.

As a writer, Carr published several children's books in the 1910s and The Iron Way: A Tale of the Builders of the West (1907), a historical novel about the Central Pacific Railroad.

Mary Carr Moore was her daughter. Sarah wrote the libretto to Mary's opera Narcissa (1911). Carr died on December 24, 1935, in Los Angeles.

== Sources ==
- Smith, Catherine Parsons; Richardson, Cynthia S. (1987). Mary Carr Moore, American Composer. University of Michigan Press. ISBN 0-472-10082-3. OCLC 14359121.
