= Grand Theatre (Wheaton, Illinois) =

- U.S. National Register of Historic Places
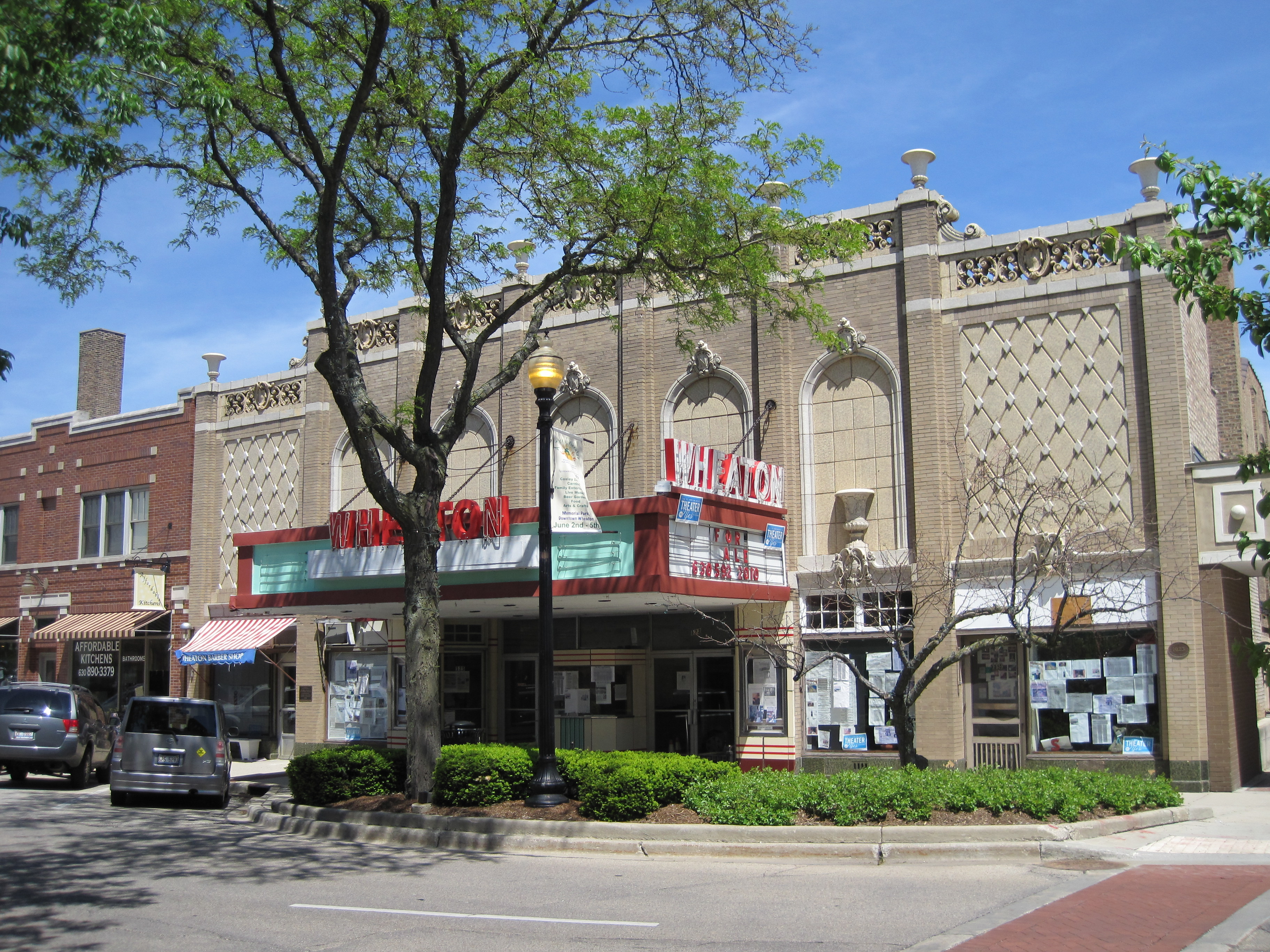
- Grand Theatre in 2011

- Location within Illinois Location within the United States
- Location: 123 N. Hale St. Wheaton, DuPage County, Illinois, U.S.
- Coordinates: 41°52′2″N 88°6′29″W
- Built: 1925
- Architect: Norman Brydges
- Architectural style: Late 19th And 20th Century Revivals
- NRHP reference No.: 05000872
- Added to NRHP: August 12, 2005

The Grand Theatre is a historic theater located in Wheaton, Illinois. It opened on May 25, 1925, with 1,000 seats, and hosted live drama, silent films, and vaudeville performances. The theater changed hands many times in the 20th century, and at various times was known as the Paramount Theatre and The Wheaton Theatre. In the late 1990s, the theater was used for second-run films, and more recently, as a small concert hall for rock and roll bands. The theater was donated to the non-profit Grand Theater Corporation in October 2001. In the fall of 2005, the building was added to the National Register of Historic Places. It was closed in 2006 for a full renovation of the property and the Grand Theater Corporation was anticipating to re-open it as a single screen theater in late 2011. However, Wheaton rejected a plan to allocate $19.3 million to finance the renovation and the theater's debts. Wheaton Park District is currently considering a $10 million plan that would reopen the theater with 860 seats. The theater will feature a donated Morton organ from the 1920s, originally from one of the Loew's Wonder Theatres.
