= Mary Carr Moore =

American classical composer

- Mary Carr Moore, from a 1933 publication.
- Born: 6 August 1873; Memphis, Tennessee
- Died: 9 January 1957 (aged 83); California
- Occupations: Composer, conductor, music educator, vocalist

Mary Carr Moore (6 August 1873 – 9 January 1957) was an American composer, conductor, vocalist, and music educator of the twentieth century. She is best remembered today for her association with the musical life of the West Coast.

== Early life ==
Moore was born Mary Louise Carr on August 6, 1873, in Memphis, Tennessee, to Unitarian minister Sarah Pratt Carr and her husband Byron Oscar Carr. She passed her childhood in Memphis and Louisville, Kentucky, until the age of ten, when her family moved to the West Coast. Here she would live for the rest of her life. Gifted musically from an early age, Moore began her studies in San Francisco, taking composition lessons from J. H. Pratt and studying singing with H. B. Pasmore. She had begun teaching and composing by 1889; a song she wrote that year was later published. In 1894 she took the lead in her first operetta, The Oracle, when it was premiered by an amateur group in San Francisco. The following year, she gave up singing to devote herself fully to teaching and composition. In 1895 she began teaching in Lemoore, California, moving to Seattle in 1901.

== Narcissa ==
While in Seattle, Moore began work on her second, and most ambitious, stage work. Titled Narcissa, or The Cost of Empire, the four-act grand opera told the story of Marcus and Narcissa Whitman and the attack on their mission in Walla Walla in 1847. Sarah Carr wrote the libretto. Several distinguished artists were imported from New York City to perform in the premiere, held in Seattle in 1912. No conductor was available; consequently, Moore herself took to the podium. The opera failed to gain a place in the repertory, and soon disappeared, although Moore conducted revivals in San Francisco in 1925 and Los Angeles in 1945.

== David Rizzio ==
In 1932, Moore was commissioned to compose an opera for production in Venice; she chose as her subject an episode in the life of Mary, Queen of Scots. David Rizzio, a grand opera in two acts, was Moore's only work written to an Italian libretto. When the performance in Venice fell through, a group of amateur organizations banded together and produced the work in Los Angeles.

== Later career ==
Moore continued composing operas after David Rizzio, although none met with much success. She had moved to Los Angeles in 1926, and was to remain there for the rest of her life; from 1928 to 1947 she taught theory and composition at Chapman College in Orange, and from 1926 to 1943 she was on the faculty of the Olga Steeb Piano School. She also worked to promote American music, organizing an American Music Center in Seattle in 1909 and aiding from 1936 to 1942 in the performance of music by local composers in Los Angeles; this last was done under the auspices of the Federal Music Project. In 1930, Narcissa belatedly won a Bispham Memorial Medal Award; in 1936 Moore was awarded an honorary doctorate in music from Chapman. She died on January 9, 1957, in Inglewood, California, and is interred at Inglewood Park Cemetery.

== Personal life ==
Moore married in her early twenties, but the marriage lasted just over a decade. It produced one daughter, Marian Hall Moore, and sons Byron Carr Moore and John Wesley Moore. In 1920 the census lists her as remarried, but that relationship, too, ended in divorce. Her son, Dr. John Wesley Moore died in an airplane crash in 1944 while serving as a military doctor in the US Air Force. She maintained close family ties, in later life supporting for some time her divorced daughter, her mother, and two grandsons.

== Compositional style ==
Moore was a conservative composer, writing music that was largely Romantic in cast. Some of her songs contain impressionistic qualities, and are reminiscent of Debussy. In later works, such as David Rizzio, Moore made greater use of the whole tone scale, yet her style remained basically tonal until the end of her career. She was violently anti-modernist; supposedly, she once left a performance of an avant-garde piece because it was making her physically ill.

Moore was sometimes[where?] classed as a member of the First Los Angeles School of composers.

== Legacy ==
Mary Carr Moore is remembered today primarily for her efforts on behalf of the musical life of the West Coast. She was among the first composers to promote opera in Seattle, and would often promote the work of her peers alongside her own. As a teacher, too, she promoted her students' work, even founding a manuscript club for regular performance of their music. Her students included composer Addie Anderson Wilson.

== Recordings ==
A handful of Moore's songs were recorded by Evelyn de la Rosa and David Rudat for Cambria Records in 1984.

== Operas ==
- The Oracle (1894)
- Narcissa, or The Cost of Empire (1911)
- The Leper (written 1912)
- Memories (1914)
- Harmony (1917)
- The Flaming Arrow, or, The Shaft of Ku' Pish-ta-ya (1922)
- David Rizzio (1928)
- Los Rubios (1931)
- Flutes of Jade Happiness (1933)
- Légende Provençale, unperformed, orchestral score lost
