= Country Dance and Song Society =

American nonprofit organization

- Abbreviation: CDSS
- Formation: 1915; 111 years ago
- Type: Nonprofit organization
- Headquarters: Easthampton, Massachusetts
- Region served: United States and Canada
- Members: 2400 individuals and 260 affiliate groups
- Executive Director: Katy German
- Budget: $1.2 million (2021)
- Staff: 12
- Website: www.cdss.org

The Country Dance and Song Society (abbreviated CDSS) is a nonprofit organization that seeks to promote participatory dance, music, and song with English and North American roots.

== History ==
CDSS began in 1915 as a series of American chapters of the English Dance and Folk Society established by Cecil Sharp.

Several US branches united under the English Folk Dance and Song Society of America in 1933, and May Gadd was appointed as its first national director. The organization consolidated in 1940. In 1949, its name was changed to Country Dance Society; “and Song” was added in 1967.

CDSS moved its office from New York City to western Massachusetts in 1987 and started a mail-order store for books, recordings, and supplies around the same time. Its website was launched in 2009. Today, CDSS supports more than 260 local affiliate groups.

== Leadership ==
- Bob Dalsemer, (1990-1996)

== Activities ==
The English country dance "Sapphire Sea" being danced at a CDSS session at Pinewoods Camp

CDSS promotes a number of types of participatory dance, including contra dance, English country dance, square dance, morris dance, rapper sword, and clogging.

CDSS runs several week-long summer camps at Pinewoods Dance Camp (MA), Camp Cavell (MI), Agassiz Village (ME), and Camp Louise (MD). They also run web chats and other online programs year-round.
