= List of Jim Crow law examples by state =

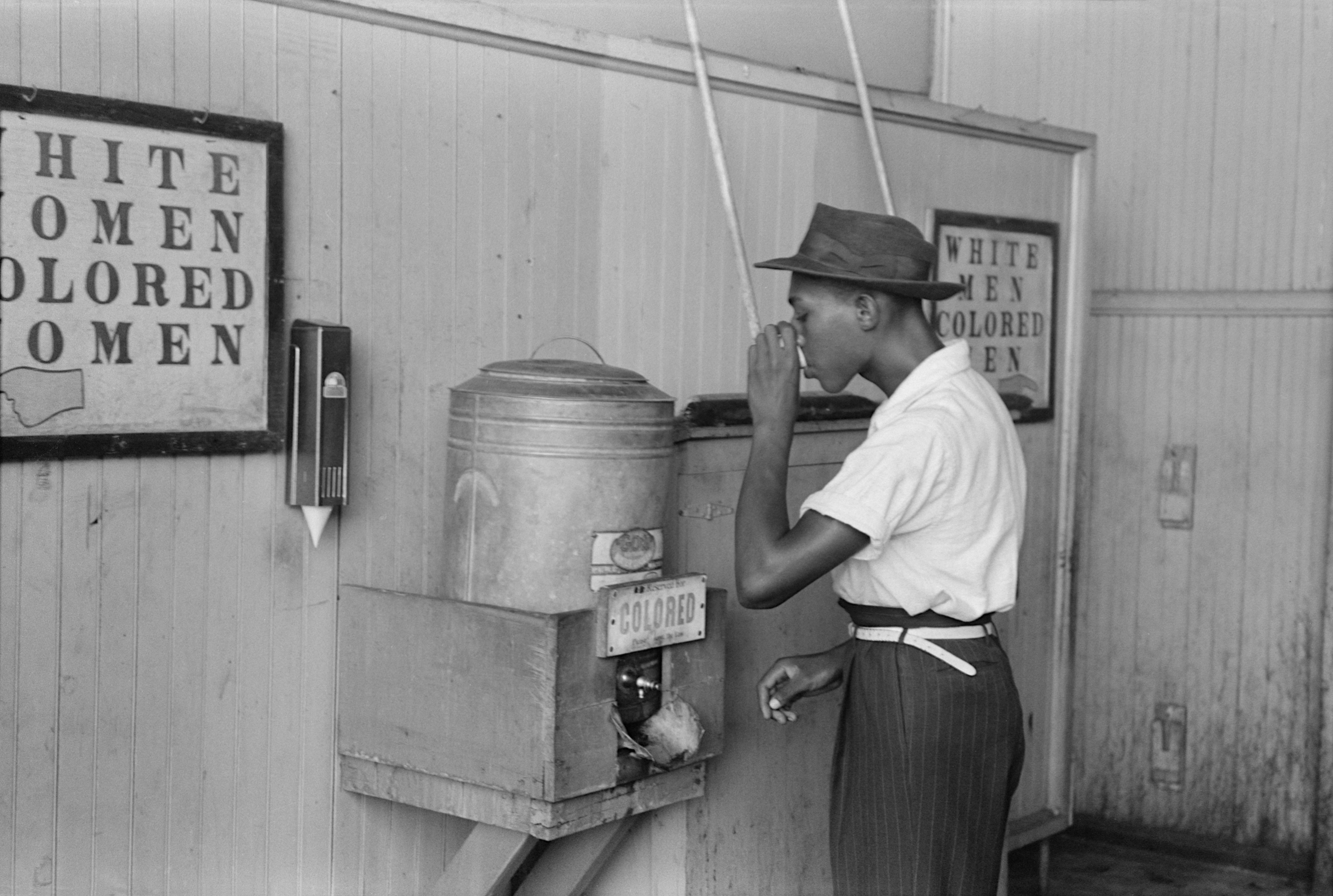
A Black American drinks from a segregated water cooler in 1939 at a streetcar terminal in Oklahoma City.

This is a list of examples of Jim Crow laws, which were state, territorial, and local laws in the United States enacted between 1865 and 1965. Jim Crow laws existed throughout the United States and originated from the Black Codes that were passed from 1865 to 1866 and from before the American Civil War. They mandated de jure segregation in all public facilities, with a supposedly "separate but equal" status for Americans of African descent. In reality, this led to treatment that was usually inferior to that provided for Americans of European descent, systematizing a number of economic, educational and social disadvantages.

State-sponsored school segregation was repudiated by the Supreme Court of the United States in 1954 in Brown v. Board of Education. Anti-miscegenation laws were repudiated in 1967 by Loving v. Virginia. Generally, segregation and discrimination were outlawed by the Civil Rights Act of 1964.

== Alabama ==
- "It shall be unlawful to conduct a restaurant or other place for the serving of food in the city, at which white and colored people are served in the same room unless such white and colored persons are effectually separated by a solid partition extending from the floor(s) upward to a distance of seven feet or higher, unless a separate entrance from the street is provided for each compartment." This law was put in place in 1934.
- The Alabama constitution of 1901 separated school houses for African Americans and White people.

== Arizona ==
1864: Miscegenation [Statute]. Marriages between whites with "Black People, Indians" were declared illegal and void. The word "Descendants" does not appear in the statute.

1901: Miscegenation [Statute] Revision of the 1864 statute which added the word "descendants" to the list of minority groups. The revised statutes also stated that marriages would be valid, if legal, where they were contracted; but noted that Arizona residents could not evade the law by going to another state to perform the ceremony.

1909: Education [Statute] School district trustees were given the authority to segregate black students from white children, only where there were more than eight Negro pupils in the school district. The legislature passed the law over a veto by the governor.

1911–1962: Segregation, miscegenation, voting [Statute] Passed six segregation laws: four against miscegenation and two school segregation statutes, and a voting rights statute that required electors to pass a literacy test. The state's miscegenation laws prohibited blacks as well as Indians and Asians from marrying whites, and were not repealed until 1962.

1927: Education [Statute] In areas with 25 or more black high school students, an election would be called to determine if these pupils should be segregated in separate but equal facilities.

1928: Miscegenation [State Code] Forbid marriages between persons of the Caucasian, Asian and Malay races.

1942: Miscegenation [Judicial Decision] Supreme Court of Arizona interprets anti-miscegenation statute in a manner which prohibits persons of mixed racial heritage from marrying anyone. Court acknowledges that its interpretation is "absurd" and recommends that Legislature pass amendment thereto.

1956: Miscegenation [Statute] Marriage of person of "Caucasian blood with Negro, Mongolian, Malay, or Hindu" void. Native Americans were originally included in an earlier statute, but were deleted by a 1942 amendment.

== California ==
In this state, concern about Asian immigration produced more legislation against Chinese immigrants than against African Americans.

In 1850 California statute provided that "no black, mulatto person, or Indian, shall be allowed to give evidence in favor of, or against a white man." In 1854, the Supreme Court of California held that the statute precluded persons of Chinese descent from testifying for or against a white man. "It can hardly be supposed that any Legislature would . . exclud[e] domestic negroes and Indians, . . . and turn loose upon the community the more degraded tribes of the same species, who have nothing in common with us."

California's constitution stated that "no native of China" shall ever exercise the privileges of an elector in the state." Similar provisions appeared in the constitutions of Oregon and Idaho...

1866–1947: Segregation, voting [Statute] Enacted 17 Jim Crow laws between 1866 and 1947 in the areas of miscegenation (6) and education (2), employment (1) and a residential ordinance passed by the city of San Francisco that required all Chinese inhabitants to live in one area of the city. Similarly, a miscegenation law passed in 1901 broadened an 1850 law, adding that it was unlawful for white persons to marry "Mongolians."

1860–1880; 1885: Education [Statute] Children of "Negroes, Mongolians, and Indians" must attend separate schools. Later amended in 1864 to enable a separate school to be established upon the written request of the parents of ten such children. "A less number may be provided for in separate schools in any other manner." Enrollment in public schools restricted to white children only in 1866, and the first mention of separate but equal was made. In 1870, the requirement to educate Chinese children was dropped entirely and separate schools were repealed in 1880, but reestablished for Chinese students in 1885.

1872: Alcohol sales [Statute] Prohibited the sale of liquor to Indians. The act remained legal until its repeal in 1920, when Prohibition made it redundant.

1879: Voter rights [Constitution] "No native of China" would ever have the right to vote in the state of California. Repealed in 1926.

1879: Employment [Constitution] Prohibited public bodies from employing Chinese and called upon the legislature to protect "the state…from the burdens and evils arising from" their presence. A statewide anti-Chinese referendum was passed by 99.4 percent of voters in 1879.

1880: Miscegenation [Statute] Made it illegal for white persons to marry a "Negro, mulatto, or Mongolian."

1890: Residential [City Ordinance] The city of San Francisco ordered all Chinese inhabitants to move into a certain area of the city within six months or face imprisonment. The Bingham Ordinance was later found to be unconstitutional by a federal court.

1891: Residential [Statute] Required all Chinese to carry with them at all times a "certificate of residence." Without it, a Chinese immigrant could be arrested and jailed.

1894: Voter rights [Constitution] Any person who could not read the Constitution in English or write his name would be disfranchised. An advisory referendum indicated that nearly 80 percent of voters supported an educational requirement.

1901: Miscegenation [Statute] The 1850 law prohibiting marriage between white persons and Negroes or mulattoes was amended, adding "Mongolian."

1909: Miscegenation [Statute] Persons of Japanese descent were added to the list of undesirable marriage partners of white Californians as noted in the earlier 1880 statute.

1913: Property [Statute] Known as the "Alien Land Laws," Asian immigrants were prohibited from owning or leasing property. The California Supreme Court struck down the Alien Land Laws in 1952.

1931: Miscegenation [State Code] Prohibited marriages between persons of the Caucasian and Asian races.

1933: Miscegenation [Statute] Broadened earlier miscegenation statute to also prohibit marriages between whites and Malays.

1945: Miscegenation [Statute] Prohibited marriage between whites and "Negroes, mulattos, Mongolians and Malays."

1947: Miscegenation [Statute] Subjected U.S. servicemen and Japanese women who wanted to marry to rigorous background checks. Barred the marriage of Japanese women to white servicemen if they were employed in undesirable occupations.

== Colorado ==
1864: Miscegenation [Statute] Marriage between Negroes and mulattoes, and white persons "absolutely void." Penalty: Fine between $50 and $550, or imprisonment between three months and two years, or both.

1864–1908: [Statute] Passed three Jim Crow laws between 1864 and 1908, all concerning miscegenation. School segregation was barred in 1876, followed by ending segregation of public facilities in 1885. Four laws protecting civil liberties were passed between 1930 and 1957 when the anti-miscegenation statute was repealed.

1908: Miscegenation [Statute] Marriage between Negroes and mulattoes, and whites prohibited. Penalties: Punishable by imprisonment from three months to two years, or a fine of between $50 and $500. Performing a marriage ceremony punishable by a fine of $50 to $500, or three months to two years' imprisonment, or both.

1930: Miscegenation [Statute] Miscegenation declared a misdemeanor.

== Connecticut ==
1879: Military [Statute] Authorized state to organize four independent companies of infantry of "colored men". Companies were to receive same pay as other companies, including one company parade in the Spring and one in September.

1935: Education [Statute] Upheld school segregation as originally authorized by statute of 1869.

== Florida ==
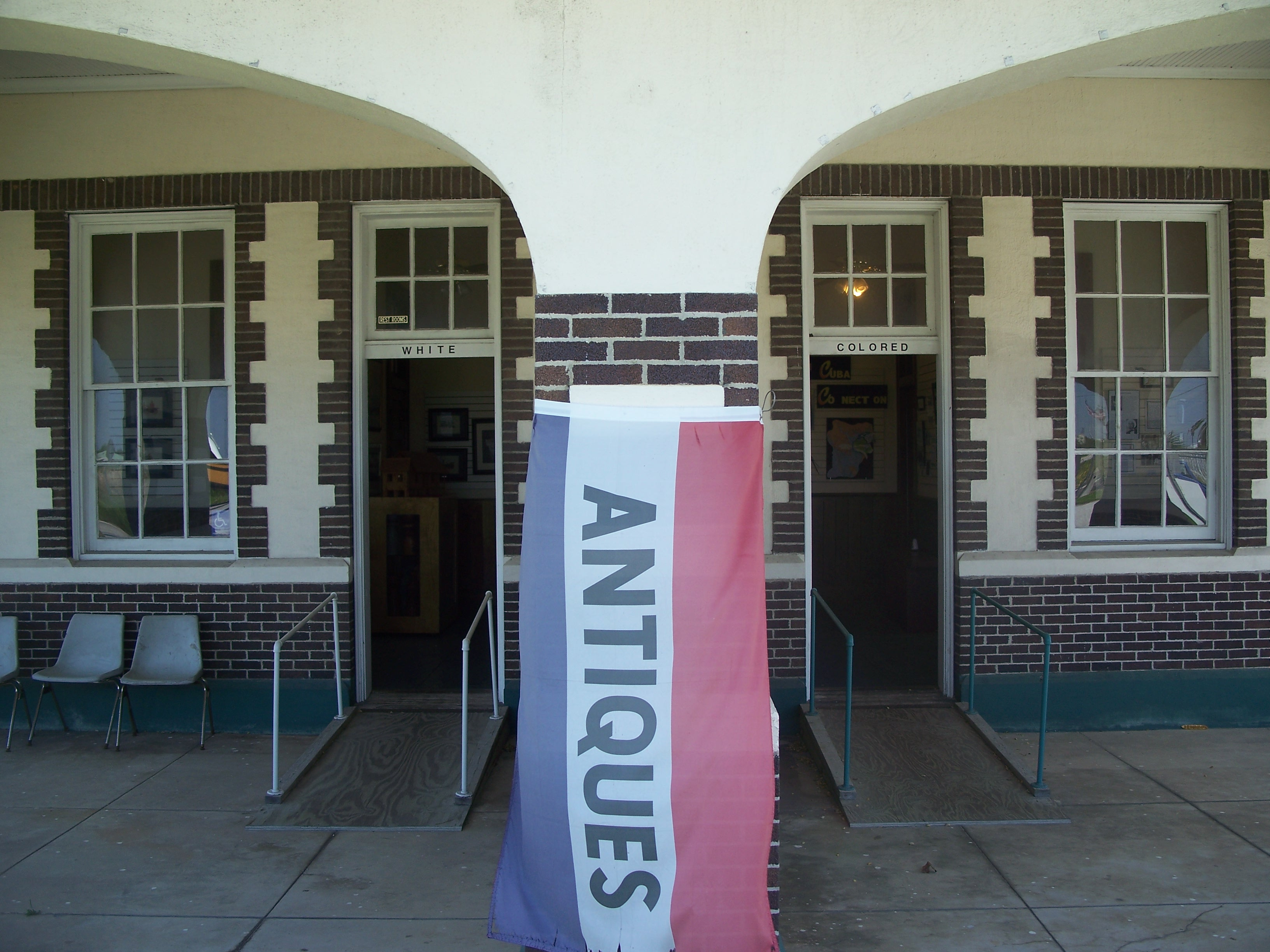
Preserved 1928-built railroad station in Punta Gorda with separate White and "Colored" entrances, a common feature among railroad stations in the Southeast US during the Jim Crow period.

- "All courtships between a white person and a Negro person, or between a white person and a person of Negro descent to the fourth generation inclusive, are hereby forever prohibited"
- "Any Black man and white woman, or any white man and/or Negro woman, who are not married to each other, who shall habitually live in and occupy in the nighttime the same room shall each be punished by imprisonment not exceeding twelve (12) months, or by fine not exceeding five hundred ($500.00) dollars."
- "The schools for white children and the schools for Negro children shall be conducted separately." Integrated education was prohibited in Florida's Constitution of 1885.
- The following is a list of legislation and penalties dealing with racial relations in Florida, some of which were in effect until passage of Florida's current Constitution in 1967:
  - 1865: Railroad statute – "Negroes or mulattoes who intruded into any railroad car reserved for white persons would be found guilty of a misdemeanor." Whites faced the same penalty for entering a car reserved for persons of color.
  - 1873: Barred public accommodation segregation statute – prohibited discrimination on account of race in the full and equal enjoyment of public accommodations such as inns, public transportation, theaters, schools, cemeteries and places of public amusement. This did not include private schools or cemeteries established exclusively for white or colored persons. (See Reconstruction Era.)
  - 1885: Education (constitution) – "White and colored children shall not be taught in the same school."
  - 1887: Railroads statute – "All respectable Negro persons" to be sold first-class tickets at the same rates as white passengers and shall be provided a separate car "equally as good and provided with the same facilities for comfort as for white persons." Conductors and railroad companies violating the provisions of the law faced a fine up to $500.
  - 1887: Education (constitution) – white and colored children were prohibited from being taught in the same schools.
  - 1895: Education [Statute] – a Penal offense for any persons to conduct any school, any grade, either public or private where whites and blacks are instructed or boarded in the same building or taught in the same class by the same teachers. Penalty: Between $150 and $500 fine, or imprisonment in the county jail between three and six months.
  - 1905: Streetcars [Statute] – Separation of races required on all streetcars.
  - 1907: Railroads [Statute] – Separate waiting rooms for each race to be provided at railroad depots along with separate ticket windows. Also called for a separation of the races on streetcars.
  - 1909: Railroads [Statute] – Separate accommodations required by race.
  - 1913: Education [Statute] – Unlawful for white teachers to teach Negroes in Negro schools, and for Negro teachers to teach in white schools.
  - 1927: Education [Statute] – a Criminal offense for teachers of one race to instruct pupils of the other in public schools.
  - 1958: Education [Statute] – County boards of education may adopt a regulation for closing schools during emergencies. Schools to close automatically when federal troops used to prevent violence.
  - 1958: Public Carrier [Statute] – Races to be segregated on public carriers.
  - 1967: Public accommodations [City Ordinance] – Sarasota passed a city ordinance stating that "Whenever members of two or more races shall be upon any public...bathing beach within the corporate limits of the City of Sarasota, it shall be the duty of the Chief of police or another officer...in charge of the public forces of the city... with the assistance of such police forces, to clear the area involved of all members of all races present.

== Illinois ==
1927: Housing [Municipal Code]

- Chicago adopted racially restrictive housing covenants beginning in 1927. In 1948, the United States Supreme Court ruled that enforcement of racial restrictive covenants was unconstitutional.

1953: Housing In August 1953, the first black family moved into Trumbull Park, a formerly all-white project of the Chicago Housing Authority.

== Indiana ==
Enacted seven Jim Crow laws in the areas of education and miscegenation between 1869 and 1952. Persons who violated the miscegenation law could be imprisoned between one and ten years. The state barred school segregation in 1877, followed by a law giving equal access to public facilities in 1885.

1869: Education [Statute] Separate schools to be provided for black children. If not a sufficient number of students to organize a separate school, trustees were to find other means of educating black children.

1905: Miscegenation [Statute] Miscegenation prohibited.

1952: Miscegenation [Statute] Marriage between whites and Negroes void.

1955: Adoption [Statute] Required that due regard be given to race on adoption petition.

== Kansas ==
Segregation laws in Kansas dealt primarily with education. The state constitution of 1859 specified separate African American schools. This practice continued until 1954.

== Kentucky ==
1866: Miscegenation
This law prohibited whites from marrying any African American who is more than 12% African American (meaning having a blood relation up to the third generation to an African American). Penalty of not following this law was a felony that was punishable by imprisonment in the state penitentiary up to five years.

1866: Education
This gave all school district trustees the right to create separate schools for African American children.

1873: Education
It was unlawful for a black child to attend a white school, and vice versa. No separate colored school was allowed to be located within 1 mile (1.6 km) of a separate white school. This law excluded schools in cities and towns but did not allow the schools in those areas within six hundred feet of the other.

1890: Railroads
All railway companies were required to provide separate but equal accommodations for white and colored passengers. Penalty to do so resulted in the passengers or conductors receiving a fine of $25 or imprisonment for 20 days. Any officers and directors of railway companies that fail to follow this law were found guilty of a misdemeanor and could be fined between $100 and $500. This law excluded streetcars.

1892: Railroads
Railroads were to provide separate coaches for white and colored passengers. Signs stating the race for each car must be posted. Penalty to do so was railway companies that failed could be fined from $500 to $1,500. Any conductors who failed to enforce the law were to be fined from $50 to $100.

1893: Miscegenation
Any marriage between a white person and an African American or mixed citizen was prohibited.

1894: Railroads
Railroad stations must provide separate but equal waiting rooms for the white and colored passengers. A sign posting what race was in what room was to be seeable by everyone. Penalty to do so would end in a fine $25 or imprisoned up to 30 days. Any agents failing to enforce the law were found guilty of misdemeanor that was punishable by a fine of $25 to $50.

1894: Miscegenation
Any marriage between a person of color and a white person was prohibited.

1902: Streetcars
All streetcars must provide separate but equal accommodations to a passenger of any race. The failure to do so ended with such penalties as passengers or conductors could receive a fine of $25 or imprisonment up to 30 days. Any railway company that refused to follow could receive a fine of $100 or imprisonment between two and six months.

1904: Education
It was unlawful to maintain or operate any college, school, or institution where persons of the white and African American races are both allowed to attend. This law did not prohibit private schools or colleges from maintaining a segregated school in a different location for each race no less than 25 miles (40 km). The penalty for not following this law resulted in any violators receiving a $1,000 fine. The United States Supreme Court upheld the constitutionality of the statute in Berea College v. Kentucky.

1908: Public Accommodation
It was unlawful for whites and blacks to purchase and consume alcohol on the same location. Penalty for this act was a misdemeanor punishable by a fine from $50 to $500 or an imprisonment in the parish prison or jail up to two years.

1908: Miscegenation
Cohabitation of a white person and an African American without legal marriage is a felony. Penalty for committing such an act resulted in imprisonment from one month to one year, with or without hard labor.

1909: Health Care
An institution for the education of colored deaf mutes was to be established. But segregation in this school was to still be enforced.

1912: Residential
Building permits for building Negro houses in white communities, or any portion of a community inhabited principally by white people, and vice versa prohibited. Penalty: violators fined from $50 to $2,000, "and the municipality shall have the right to cause said building to be removed and destroyed."

1914: Public Accommodation
All circuses, shows and tent exhibitions were required to provide two ticket offices with individual ticket sellers and two entrances to the performance for each race.

1915: Education
No white children were allowed to attend any graded common school for colored children and vice versa.

1918: Prisons
This law allowed the segregation of races in all municipal, parish, and state prisons.

1921: Education
This law called for separate public schools for the education of white and black children between the ages of six and eighteen.

1921: Housing
This prohibited African American and white families from living in the same home.

1928: Education
This gave separate textbooks for white and African American school children.

1928: Public Carrier
Separate but equal accommodations were required to be provided on all forms of public transportation.

1932: Residential
No person or businesses were allowed to rent an apartment in an apartment complex or other housing buildings to a person who differs in race from the other occupants.

1932: Miscegenation
All interracial marriages were outlawed. Invalidated interracial marriages if the parties went to another legal power where such marriages were legal. Marriages between African Americans and Native Americans were also prohibited.

1933: Public Accommodations
Establishment of segregated libraries for different races was authorized.

1934: Education
All schools were required to be racially segregated.

1942: Health Care
There were to be separate but equal accommodations for whites and African Americans provided in nursing homes.

1944: Miscegenation
Any marriage between a white person and an African American or racially mixed citizen was prohibited. Penalty to follow this law was a fine of $500 to $5,000. If the people continued to be interracially married the result would be imprisonment in prison from three to twelve months.

1944: Railroads
Separate coaches for white and African American passengers were required.

1948: Barred School Segregation
This law did not allow African American physicians and nurses to take postgraduate courses in public hospitals and Louisville.

1950: Barred School Segregation
African Americans were allowed to attend colleges and universities under two conditions. These conditions are that if comparable courses were not available at Kentucky's African American College in Frankfort, KY and the school's governing body had to approve of this act.

1951: Miscegenation
Any intimate relation between whites and African Americans was illegal. Failure to follow this law ended in fines up to $1,000, up to five years in prison, or both.

1951: Adoption
Interracial adoptions were banned.

1952: Miscegenation
Interracial marriages were prohibited. Penalty of failing to follow this law was Up to $1,000 and/or five years in prison.

1953: Health Care
It was required to establish separate tuberculosis hospitals for each race. This law was then repealed in 1954.

1956: Public Carriers
This law revised older laws that required common carriers to provide separate waiting rooms for white intrastate passengers and for African American intrastate passengers.

1956: Employment
Provided that all persons, firms, or corporations create separate bathroom facilities for members of the white and African American races employed by them or allowed to come into the business. In addition, separate rooms to eat in as well as separate eating and drinking utensils were required to be provided for members of the white and African American races. Not following this law gave to offender a misdemeanor, a fine of $100 to $1,000, or 60 days to one year in prison.

1956: Recreation
All businesses were prohibited from permitting any dancing, social functions, entertainments, athletic training, games, sports or contests on their premises in which the participants are members of the white and African American races.

1956: Public Accommodations
All public parks, recreation centers, playgrounds, etc. were required to be segregated.

1956: Public Carrier
All forms of public transportation were to be segregated.

1957: Education
All public schools were required to be racially segregated.

1957: Education
There were to be no state funds to non-segregated schools.

1960: Voting Rights
The races of all candidates were to be written on the ballots.

== Louisiana ==
1890 Separate Car Act, violations of the law were a misdemeanor crime punishable by a fine of at most $25 or twenty days in jail

1900 "Any person who shall rent any part of any such building to a Negro person or a Negro family when such building is already in whole or in part in occupancy by a white person or white family, or vice versa when the building is in occupancy by a Negro person or Negro family, shall be guilty of a misdemeanor, and will be fined $2,000."]

== Maryland ==
- 1904: "All railroad companies and corporations, and all persons running or operating cars or coaches by steam on any railroad line or track in the State of Maryland, for the transportation of passengers, are hereby required to provide separate cars or coaches for the travel and transportation of the white and colored passengers."

== Massachusetts ==
The term "Jim Crow Law" was first used in 1841 in reference to a Massachusetts law that required the railways to provide a separate car for black passengers and the "separate but equal" doctrine, Massachusetts.

- 1705: The Massachusetts colonial legislature passes law prohibiting marriage and fornication between negroes or mulattoes and whites. In 1786, the ban on fornication was removed, but the ban on mixed marriages was expanded to include Indians.
- 1840–1850: Public schools in the communities of Salem, Nantucket, and Boston, Massachusetts, were separated on racial criteria. In 1855 segregation in public education was officially abolished with a law by the Massachusetts legislature.

== Mississippi ==
- "printed, typewritten or written matter urging or presenting for public acceptance or general information, arguments or suggestions in favor of social equality or of intermarriage between whites and Negroes, shall be guilty of a misdemeanor and subject to fine not exceeding five hundred (500.00) dollars or imprisonment not exceeding six (6) months or both
- "Every person... operating... any public hall, theater, opera house, motion picture show or any place of public entertainment or public assemblage which is attended by both white and colored persons, shall separate the white race and the colored race and shall set apart and designate... certain seats therein to be occupied by white persons and a portion thereof, or certain seats therein, to be occupied by colored persons."
- "The conductors or managers on all such railroads shall have power, and are hereby required, to assign to each white or colored passenger his or her respective car, coach or compartment. If the passenger fails to disclose his race, the conductor and managers, acting in good faith, shall be the sole judges of his race."
- Racial Integrity Act of 1924

== Missouri ==
- "Separate free schools shall be established for the education of children of African descent; and it shall be unlawful for any colored child to attend any white school, or any white child to attend a colored..."

== Montana ==
Four Jim Crow laws were enacted in Montana between 1871 and 1921. The school segregation act was repealed in 1895. A 1909 miscegenation law prohibited marriage between Caucasians and blacks as well as Chinese and Japanese.

1871: Education [Statute] Children of African descent would be provided separate schools.

1897: Voting rights [Statute] Excluded "any person living on an Indian or military reservation" from residency, unless that person had acquired a residence in a county of the state and is in the employment of the government while living on a reservation. Without residency, a person could not vote.

1897: Residency [Statute] An 1897 statute excluded "any person living on an Indian or military reservation" from residency, unless that person had acquired a residence in a county of MT and is in the employ of the government while living on a reservation."

1909: Miscegenation [Statute] Prohibited intermarriage between whites and Negroes, Chinese and Japanese. Penalty: Misdemeanor, carrying a fine of $500 or imprisonment of one month, or both.

1921: Miscegenation [State Code] Miscegenation prohibited. Nullified interracial marriages if parties went to another jurisdiction where legal. Also prohibited marriages between persons of the Caucasian and Asian races.

== Nebraska ==
1865: Miscegenation [Statute] Declared marriage between whites and a Negro or mulatto as illegal. Penalty: Misdemeanor, with a fine up to $100, or imprisonment in the county jail up to six months, or both.

1911: Miscegenation [Statute] Marriages between a white and colored person declared illegal. Also noted that marriages between whites and those persons with one-quarter or more Negro blood were void.

1929: Miscegenation [Statute] Forbid marriages between persons of the Caucasian race and those persons with one eighth or more Asian blood.

1943: Miscegenation [Statute] Prohibited marriage of whites with anyone with one-eighth or more Negro, Japanese or Chinese blood.

== Nevada ==
Enacted four miscegenation laws and a school segregation statute between 1865 and 1957. The education statute declared that blacks, Asians and Indians were prohibited from attending public schools, and that a separate school would be established for them if "deemed advisable." The state's miscegenation law offered an extensive list of inappropriate marriage candidates by race and color for Caucasians, including blacks, "Malay or brown race, Mongolian or yellow race, or Indian or red race." The miscegenation statute was repealed in 1959.

1865: Education [Statute] Negroes, Asians, and Indians prohibited from attending public schools. The Board of Trustees of any district could establish a separate school for educating Negroes, Asians, and Indians, if deemed advisable.

1912: Miscegenation [Statute] Unlawful for a white person to intermarry with any person of "Ethiopian or black race, Malay or brown race, Mongolian or yellow race, or Indian or red race, within the State." Penalty: Misdemeanor for participants and the minister who performs such a ceremony. White persons found to be living with the above-mentioned groups would be fined between $100 and $500, or confined in the county jail from six months to one year, or both.

1929: Miscegenation [Statute] Miscegenation declared a misdemeanor. Also forbade marriages between persons of the Caucasian, Asian and Malay races.

1955: Miscegenation [Statute] Miscegenation illegal. Penalty: $500 to $1,000 and/or six months to one year imprisonment.

1957: Miscegenation [Statute] Gross misdemeanor for white to marry person of black, brown, or yellow race.

== New Mexico ==
- "Separate rooms [shall] be provided for the teaching of pupils of African descent, and [when] said rooms are so provided, such pupils may not be admitted to the school rooms occupied and used by pupils of Caucasian or others descent."

== North Carolina ==
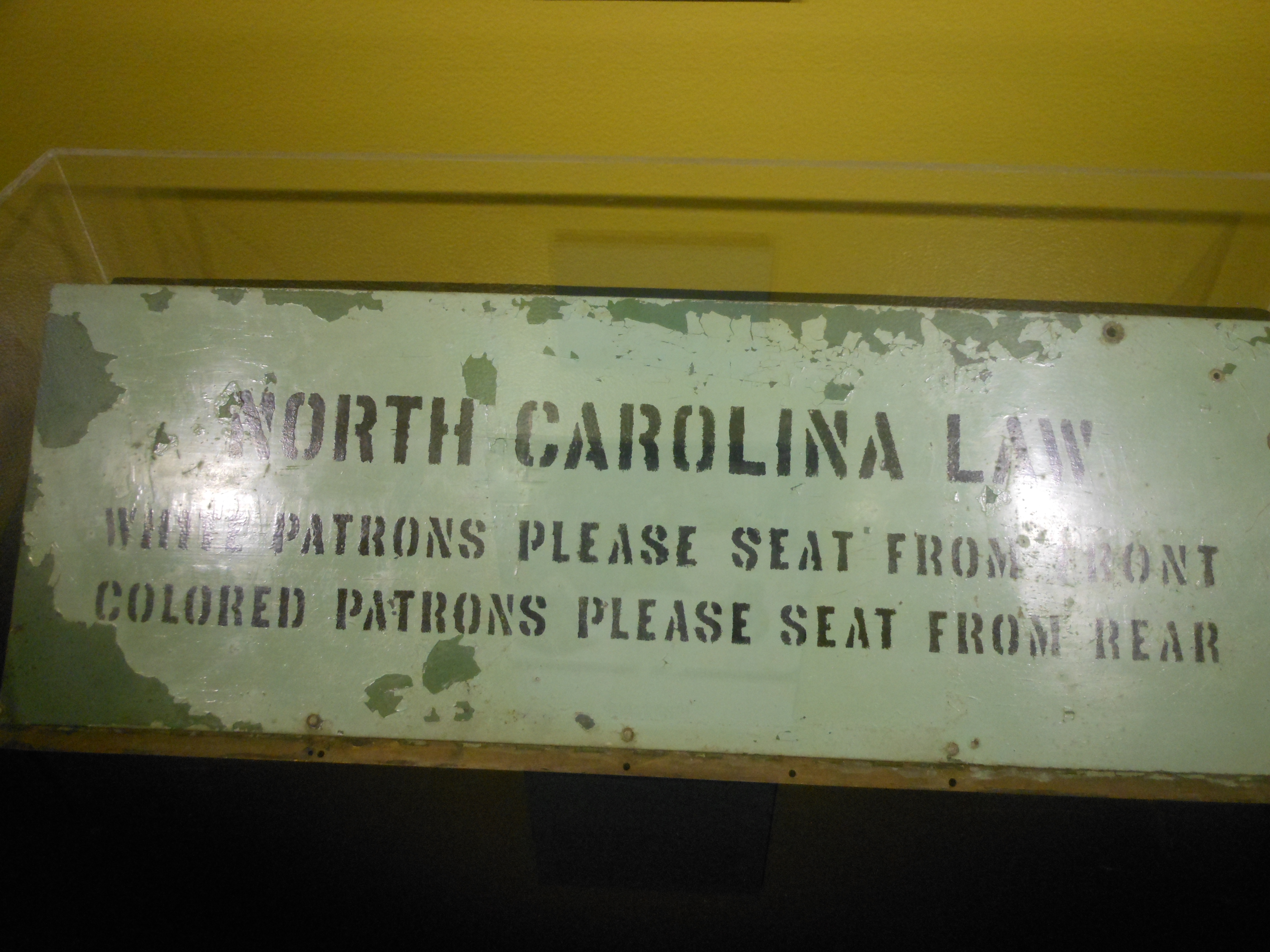
Sign for bus segregation in North Carolina.

- "Books shall not be interchangeable between the white and colored schools but shall continue to be used by the race first using them." (written in 1889)
- "The state librarian is directed to fit up and maintain a separate place for the use of the colored people who may come to the library to read books or periodicals."

== North Dakota ==
The state passed three Jim Crow laws. A 1943 statute barring miscegenation was repealed in 1955. An 1899 Constitutional amendment gave the legislature authority to implement educational qualifications for electors.

1933: Education [Statute] Law stated that "it would not be expedient to have the Indian children mingle with the white children in our educational institutions by reason of the vastly different temperament and mode of living and other differences and difficulties of the two races.

1943: Miscegenation [State Code] Cohabitation between blacks and whites prohibited. Penalty: 30 days to one year imprisonment, or $100 to $500 fine.

== Ohio ==
Enacted a miscegenation statute in 1877 and a school segregation law in 1878. Segregation of public facilities was barred in 1884, and the earlier miscegenation and school segregation laws were overturned in 1887. In 1953, the state enacted a law requiring that race be considered in adoption decisions which was supplanted in 1996 by Ohio's implementation of the federal multiethnic placement act (MEPA), by an administrative rule which is still in place as of February, 2021.

1877: Miscegenation [Statute] Unlawful for a person of "pure white blood, who intermarries, or has illicit carnal intercourse, with any Negro or person having a distinct and visible admixture of African blood." Penalty: Fined up to $100, or imprisoned up to three months, or both. Any person who knowingly officiates such a marriage charged with misdemeanor and fined up to $100 or imprisoned in three months, or both.

1878: Education [Statute] School districts given discretion to organize separate schools for colored children if "in their judgment it may be for the advantage of the district to do so."

1953: Adoption [Statute] Race to be taken into account on adoption petitions.

== Oklahoma ==
1903: Mining-bath facilities [Statute] 1908: Voting [State Code] In 1907, inmates of institutions were excluded from voting. "Any person kept in a poorhouse at public expense, except federal, Confederate, and Spanish-American ex-soldiers or sailors."

1928: Recreation—Fishing, Boating, and Bathing [Statute] "The [Conservation] Commission shall have the right to make segregation of the white and colored races as to the exercise of rights of fishing, boating and bathing." (Martin Luther King Jr. NHS)

1937: Telephone Booths [Statute] "The Corporation Commission is hereby vested with power and authority to require telephone companies...to maintain separate booths for white and colored patrons when there is a demand for such separate booths. That the Corporation Commission shall determine the necessity for said separate booths only upon complaint of the people in the town and vicinity to be served after due hearing as now provided by law in other complaints filed with the Corporation Commission." (Martin Luther King Jr. NHS)

== Oregon ==
Enacted two miscegenation laws in 1867 and 1930 prohibiting intermarriage between whites and blacks, Chinese, Kanakas or any person having more than one half Indian blood. A 1953 statute required that adoption petitions note the race of prospective adopting parents. A 1924 statute required electors to read the Constitution in English.

1867: Miscegenation [Statute] Unlawful for any white person to intermarry with any "Negro, Chinese, or any person having one-quarter or more Negro, Chinese or kanaka blood, or any person having more than one-half Indian blood." Penalty: Imprisonment in the penitentiary or the county jail for between three months and one year. Those who licensed or performed such a ceremony could be jailed for three months to one year, or fined between $100 and $1,000.

1924: Voting rights [State Code] Required electors to read the Constitution in English and write their name.

1924: Voting [Statute] Statute and constitutional amendment passed in 1924 required electors to read the constitution in English and write their name.

1930: Miscegenation [State Code] Miscegenation declared a felony. Also forbid marriages between persons of the Caucasian race and those persons with one fourth or more Chinese or Kanaka blood.

1953: Adoption [Statute] Adoption petition must state race or color of adopting parents.

== Pennsylvania ==
1869: Education [Statute] Black children were prohibited from attending Pittsburgh schools.

== Rhode Island ==
1872: Miscegenation [State Code] Prohibited intermarriage. Penalty: $1,000 fine, or up to six months' imprisonment.

== South Carolina ==
- "No persons, firms, or corporations, who or which furnish meals to passengers at station restaurants or station eating houses, in times limited by common carriers of said passengers, shall furnish said meals to white and colored passengers in the same room, or at the same table, or at the same counter."
- "Electric railways outside of the corporate limits of cities and towns shall have authority to separate the races in their cars, and the conductors in charge of said cars are hereby authorized and directed to separate the races in said cars under their charge and control."
- "Any circus or other such traveling show exhibiting under canvas or out of doors for gain shall maintain two main entrances to such exhibition, and one shared persons attending such show or traveling exhibition shall pass in and out of the entrance provided for colored persons."
- "That it shall be unlawful for any person, firm or corporation engaged in the business of cotton textile manufacturing in this State to allow or permit operatives, help and labor of different races to labor and work together within the same room, or to use the same doors of entrance and exit at the same time, or to use and occupy the same pay ticket windows or doors for paying off its operatives and laborers at the same time, or to use the same stairway and windows at the same time, or to use at any time the same lavatories, toilets, drinking water buckets, pails, cups, dippers or glasses:"
- "It shall be unlawful for any parent, relative, or other white person in this State, having the control or custody of any white child, by right of guardianship, natural or acquired, or otherwise, to dispose of, give or surrender such white child permanently into the custody, control, maintenance, or support, of a negro."
- "It shall be unlawful for any white man to intermarry with any woman of either the Indian or negro races, or any mulatto, mestizo, or half breed, or for any white woman to intermarry with any person other than a white man, or for any mulatto, half-breed, Indian, negro or mestizo to intermarry with a white woman; and any such marriage, or attempted marriage, shall be utterly null and void and of none effect;"

== South Dakota ==
Enacted three miscegenation laws between 1809 and 1913, and a 1952 statute that required adoption petitions to state the race of both the petitioner and child. A 1913 miscegenation law broadened the list of races unacceptable as marriage partners for whites to include persons belonging to the "African, Korean, Malayan, or Mongolian race." This law reflected the nation's growing tension over the massive waves of immigrants entering the country during the early twentieth century. The miscegenation law was repealed in 1957.

1909: Miscegenation [nemkns] Intermarriage or illicit cohabitation forbidden between blacks and whites. Penalty: Felony, punishable by a fine up to $1,000, or by imprisonment up to ten years, or both.

1913: Miscegenation [Statute] Law expanded to prohibit marriage between whites and persons belonging to the "African, Corean [Korean], Malayan, or Mongolian race." Penalty: Felony, punishable by a fine up to $1,000, or by imprisonment in state prison up to ten years, or both.

1929: Miscegenation [Statute] Miscegenation declared a felony. Also forbid marriages between persons of the Caucasian, Asian and Malay races.

1952: Adoption [State Code] Adoption petitions must state race of petitioner and child.

== Tennessee ==
The state of Tennessee enacted 20 Jim Crow laws between 1866 and 1955, including six requiring school segregation, four which outlawed miscegenation, three which segregated railroads, two requiring segregation for public accommodations, and one which mandated segregation on streetcars. The 1868 law declared that no citizen could be excluded from the University of Tennessee because of race or color but then mandated that instructional facilities for black students be separate from those used by white students. As of 1954, segregation laws for miscegenation, transportation and public accommodation were still in effect.

1866: Education [Statute] Separate schools required for white and black children.

1869: Barred school segregation [Statute] While no citizen of Tennessee could be excluded from attending the University of Tennessee on account of his race or color, "the accommodation and instruction of persons of color shall be separate from those for white persons."

1870: Miscegenation [Constitution] Intermarriage prohibited between white persons and Negroes, or descendants of Negro ancestors to the third generation.

1870: Miscegenation [Statute] Penalty for intermarriage between whites and blacks was labeled a felony, punishable by imprisonment in the penitentiary from one to five years.

1870: Education [Statute] Schools for white and colored children to be kept separate.

1873: Education [Statute] "White and colored persons shall not be taught in the same school, but in separate schools under the same general regulations as to management, usefulness and efficiency."

1875: Public accommodations [Statute] Hotel keepers, carriers of passengers and keepers of places of amusement have the right to control access and exclude persons as "that of any private person over his private house."

1881: Railroads [Statute] Railroad companies required to furnish separate cars for colored passengers who pay first-class rates. Cars to be kept in good repair, and subject to the same rules governing other first-class cars for preventing smoking and obscene language. Penalty: If companies fail to enforce the law required to pay a forfeit of $100, half to be paid to the person suing, the other half to be paid to the state's school fund.

1882: Railroads [Statute]

1881: law amended to state that railroads required to supply first-class passenger cars to all persons paying first-class rates. Penalty: $300 fine payable to the public school fund.

1885: Public accommodations [Statute] All well-behaved persons to be admitted to theaters, parks, shows, or other public amusements, but also declared that proprietors had the right to create separate accommodations for whites and Negroes.

1891: Railroads [Statute] Railways to provide equal but separate accommodations for the white and colored races. Penalty: Railroad companies that failed to comply with law guilty of a misdemeanor and subject to fines from $100 to $500. Conductors could be fined from $25 to $50.

1901: Education [Statute] Unlawful for any school or college to permit white and colored persons to attend the same school. Penalty: $50 fine, or imprisonment from 30 days to six months, or both.

1905: Streetcars [Statute] All street cars required to designate a portion of each car for white passengers and also for colored passengers. Required signs to be posted. Special cars could be run for one race exclusively. Penalty: Streetcar companies could be fined $25 for each offense. Passengers who refused to take the proper seat could be fined $25.

1925: Education [Statute] Separate elementary and high schools to be maintained for white and Negro children.

1932: Race classification [State Code] Classified "Negro" as any person with any Negro blood.

1932: Miscegenation [State Code] Miscegenation declared a felony.

1932: Education [State Code] Required racially segregated high schools.

1953: Voting rights protected [Constitution] Repealed poll tax statute.

1955: Public carriers [State Code] Public carriers to be segregated.

1955: Employment [State Code] Separate washrooms in mines required.

1955: Health Care [State Code] Separate buildings for black and white patients in hospitals for the insane.

1955: Miscegenation [State Code] Prohibited marriage or living together as man and wife between racially mixed persons. Penalty: One to five years imprisonment in county jail, or fine.

== Texas ==
Twenty-nine Jim Crow laws were passed in Texas. The state enacted one anti-segregation law in 1871 barring separation of the races on public carriers. This law was repealed in 1889.

1865: Juneteenth [Constitution] The people of Texas are informed that, in accordance with a proclamation from the Executive of the United States, all slaves are free. This involves an absolute equality of personal rights and rights of property between former masters and slaves, and the connection heretofore existing between them becomes that between employer and hired labor. The freedmen are advised to remain quietly at their present homes and work for wages. They are informed that they will not be allowed to collect at military posts and that they will not be supported in idleness either there or elsewhere.

1866: Education [Constitution] All taxes paid by African Americans go to maintaining African schools. Duty of the legislature to "encourage colored schools."

1866: Railroads [Statute] All railroad companies shall attach one passenger car for the special accommodation of freedmen.

1871: Barred segregation on public carriers [Statute] Public carriers prohibited from making any distinctions in the carrying of passengers. Penalty: Misdemeanor punishable by a fine from $100 to $500, or imprisonment from 30 to 90 days, or both.

1876: Voting rights [Constitution] Required electors to pay poll tax

1879: Miscegenation [Statute] Confirmed intermarriage law passed in 1858. Penalty applied equally to both parties.

1889: Railroads [Statute] Railroad companies required to maintain separate coaches for white and colored passengers, equal in comfort. Penalty: Passengers refusing to sit where assigned were guilty of a misdemeanor, and could be fined between $5 and $20.

1891: Railroads [Statute] Separate coach laws strengthened. Separate coaches for white and Negro passengers to be equal in all points of comfort and convenience. Designed by signage posted in a conspicuous place in each compartment. Trains allowed to carry chair cars or sleeping cars for the exclusive use of either race. Law did not apply to streetcars. Penalty: Conductors who failed to enforce law faced misdemeanor charge punish able by a fine from $5 to $25. The railroad company could be fined from $100 to $1,000 for each trip. Passengers who refused to sit in designated areas faced fines from $5 to $25.

1907: Streetcars [Statute] Required all streetcars to comply with the separate coach law passed in 1889. Penalty: Streetcar companies could be fined from $100 to $1,000 for failing to enact law. A passenger wrongfully riding in an improper coach was guilty of a misdemeanor, and faced fines from $5 to $25

1909: Railroads [Statute] Depot buildings required to provide separate waiting areas for the use of white and Negro passengers.

1914: Railroads [Statute] Negro porters shall not sleep in sleeping car berths nor use bedding intended for white passengers.

1915: Miscegenation [State Code] The penalty for intermarriage is imprisonment in the penitentiary from two to five years.

1919: Public accommodations [Statute] Ordered that Negroes were to use separate branches of county free libraries.

1922: Voting Rights [Statute] "...in no event shall a Negro be eligible to participate in a Democratic party primary election held in the State of Texas. " Overturned in 1927 by U.S. Supreme Court in Nixon v. Herndon.

1925: Education [Statute] Required racially segregated schools.

1925: Public accommodations [Statute] Separate branches for Negroes to be administered by a Negro custodian in all county libraries.

1925: Miscegenation [Penal Code] Miscegenation declared a felony. Nullified interracial marriages if parties went to another jurisdiction where such marriages were legal.

1926: Public carriers [Statute] Public carriers to be segregated.

1935: Health Care [Statute] Established a state tuberculosis sanitarium for blacks.

1935: Public carriers [State Code] Directed that separate coaches for whites and blacks on all common carriers.

1943: Public carriers [State Code] Ordered separate seating on all buses.

1949: Employment [Statute] Coal mines required to have separate washrooms.

1950: Public accommodations [Statute] Separate facilities required for white and black citizens in state parks.

1951: Voting rights [Constitution] Required electors to pay poll tax.

1951: Miscegenation [Statute] Unlawful for person of Caucasian blood to marry person of African blood. Penalty: Two to five years' imprisonment.

1952: Health Care [Statute] Establishment of TB hospitals for blacks.

1953: Public carriers [Penal Code] Public carriers to be segregated.

1956: Public accommodations [Municipal Ordinance] Abolished previously required segregation in the city of San Antonio's swimming pools and other recreational facilities.

1958: Education [Statute] No child compelled to attend schools that are racially mixed. No desegregation unless approved by election. Governor may close schools where troops used on federal authority.

1960: Miscegenation [State Code] Strictly Prohibited marriage or living together as man and wife between racially mixed persons. Penalty: One to ten years imprisonment in county jail, or fine

== Utah ==
Five miscegenation laws were passed in Utah between 1851 and 1953, prohibiting intermarriage between whites and those of African or Asian descent. School segregation was barred in 1895. The state's miscegenation law was repealed in 1963.

1851: Miscegenation [An Act in Relation to Service, Sec. 4, Acts of the Territory of Utah, 1851.] Prohibited sexual intercourse between any white person and "any of the African race".

1888: Miscegenation [Chapter XLV, Laws of Utah, 1888.] Intermarriage prohibit between a Negro/colored and a white person, and between a "Mongolian" and a white person.

1907: Miscegenation [Chapter 29, Laws of Utah, 1907. Amended 1184, Revised Statutes of Utah, 1898] Marriage laws amended, with earlier intermarriage provision remaining the same.

1933: Miscegenation [Revised Statute, 1933. Statute 40–1–2.] Prohibited marriages between persons of the Caucasian and Asian races.

1953: Miscegenation [State Code] Marriage between "white and Negro, Malayan, mulatto, quadroon, or octoroon void."

== Virginia ==
1. Be it enacted by the (general) assembly of Virginia, That the State registrar of vital statistics may, as soon as practicable after the taking effect of this act, prepare a form whereon the racial composition of any individual, as Caucasian, Negro, Mongolian, American Indian, Asiatic Indian, Malay, or any mixture thereof, or any other non-Caucasic strains, and if there be any mixture, then, the racial composition of the parents and other ancestors, in so far as ascertainable, so as to show in what generation such mixture occurred, may be certified by such individual, which form shall be known as a registration certificate. The State registrar may supply to each local registrar a sufficient number of such forms for the purpose of this act; each local registrar may; personally or by deputy, as soon as possible after receiving such forms, have made thereon in duplicate a certificate of the racial composition, as aforesaid, of each person resident in his district, who so desires, born before June 14, 1912, which certificate shall be made over the signature of said person, or in the case of children under fourteen years of age, over the signature of a parent, guardian, or other person standing in loco parentis. One of said certificates for each person thus registering in every district shall be forwarded to the State registrar for his files; the other shall be kept on file by the local registrar. Every local registrar may, as soon as practicable, have such registration certificate made by or for each person in his district who so desires, born before June 14, 1912, for whom he has not on file a registration certificate, or a birth certificate.
2. It shall be a felony for any person willfully or knowingly to make a registration certificate false as to color or race. The willful making of a false registration or birth certificate shall be punished by confinement in the penitentiary for one year.
3. For each registration certificate properly made and returned to the State registrar, the local registrar returning the same shall be entitled to a fee of twenty-five cents, to be paid by the registrant. Application for registration and for transcript may be made direct to the State registrar, who may retain the fee for expenses of his office.
4. No marriage license shall be granted until the clerk or deputy clerk has reasonable assurance that the statements as to color of both man and woman are correct. If there is reasonable cause to disbelieve that applicants are of pure white race, when that fact is stated, the clerk or deputy clerk shall withhold the granting of the license until satisfactory proof is produced that both applicants are "white persons" as provided for in this act. The clerk or deputy clerk shall use the same care to assure himself that both applicants are colored, when that fact is claimed.
5. It shall hereafter be unlawful for any white person in this State to marry any save a white person, or a person with no other admixture of blood than white and American Indian. For the purpose of this act, the term "white person" shall apply only to the person who has no trace whatsoever of any blood other than Caucasian; but persons who have one-sixteenth or less of the blood of the American Indian and have no other non-Caucasic blood shall be deemed to be white persons. All laws heretofore passed and now in effect regarding the intermarriage of white and colored persons shall apply to marriages prohibited by this act.
6. For carrying out the purposes of this act and to provide the necessary clerical assistance, postage and other expenses of the State registrar of vital statistics, twenty percent of the fees received by local registrars under this act shall be paid to the State bureau of vital statistics, which may be expended by the said bureau for the purposes of this act.
7. All acts or parts of acts inconsistent with this act are, to the extent of such inconsistency, hereby repealed.

== Washington State ==
Enacted a miscegenation statute in 1866 forbidding marriage between whites and Negroes or Indians. This law was repealed in 1887.

Six civil rights laws barring segregation were passed between 1890 and 1956.

1866: Miscegenation [Statute] Prohibited marriage between white persons and Negroes, Indians, or a person of half or more Negro or Indian blood.

1887: Barred anti-miscegenation [Statute] Repealed anti-miscegenation law.

1896: Voting rights [Constitution] "Indians not taxed shall never be allowed the elective franchise."

1896: Voting [Constitution] A constitutional passed in 1896 requiring electors to read and speak English. In 1912 a statute was passed noting, "If naturalized, must furnish satisfactory evidence that he is capable of reading and speaking the English language so as to comprehend the meaning of ordinary English prose."

1920: Restrictive Housing Covenants [Municipal Code] Beginning in the 1920s, Seattle realtors frequently discriminated against minorities. In November 1927 the Capitol Hill development used a covenant that read: "The parties...agree each with the others that no part of the lands owned by them shall ever be used or occupied by or sold, conveyed, leased, rented or given to Negroes or any person of Negro blood." An April 1928 covenant for the Broadmoor subdivision read: "No part of said property hereby conveyed shall ever be used or occupied by any Hebrew or any person of the Ethiopian, Malay or any Asiatic race..."

Until 1950, Article 34 of the Code of Ethics for realtors in Seattle included the following clause: "A Realtor should never be instrumental in introducing into a neighborhood a character of property or occupancy, members of any race or nationality, or any individual whose presence will clearly be detrimental to property values in that neighborhood." Voluntary agreements between realtors and homeowners continued well into the 1960s.

In 1964, Seattle voters rejected a referendum that prohibited housing discrimination. In April 1968, the city council passed an open housing ordinance, making restrictive covenants illegal.

== West Virginia ==
1863: Anti-miscegenation law included in the state constitution. Overturned by Loving v Virginia in 1967.

1872: "White and colored persons shall not be taught in the same school." This point-blank requirement for segregated schools was proclaimed in West Virginia's State Constitution as Article XII Section 8. In a remarkable show of the persistence of such attitudes extending to the highest levels of state government, numerous attempts to remove this from the constitution were defeated in the state legislature until it was finally repealed in November 1994.

1873: Black citizens are prohibited from serving on juries. Overturned by Strauder v West Virginia in 1880.

== Wyoming ==
1887: Education [Statute] Separate schools could be provided for colored children when there were fifteen or more colored children within any school district.

1889: Voting rights [Constitution] Required electors to read the state Constitution.

1908: Intermarriage [Statute] All marriages of white persons with Negroes, Mulattos, Mongolians, or Malaya hereafter contracted in the State of Wyoming are and shall be illegal and void. (Martin Luther King Jr. NHS)

1931: Education [Statute] Schools to be segregated only when fifteen or more colored children were in a district.

1931: Miscegenation [Statute] Declared miscegenation a misdemeanor. Also prohibited marriages between persons of the Caucasian, Asian and Malay races.

1945: Miscegenation [Statute] Marriage of whites to Negroes, mulattoes, Mongolians, Malayans void. Penalty: $100 to $1,000 and/or one to five years imprisonment.

== Bibliography ==
- Brogan, Hugh (1999). The Penguin History of the USA (2nd ed.). London: Penguin. ISBN 978-0-14-025255-2.
