= William Goodell Frost =

American scholar (1854–1938)

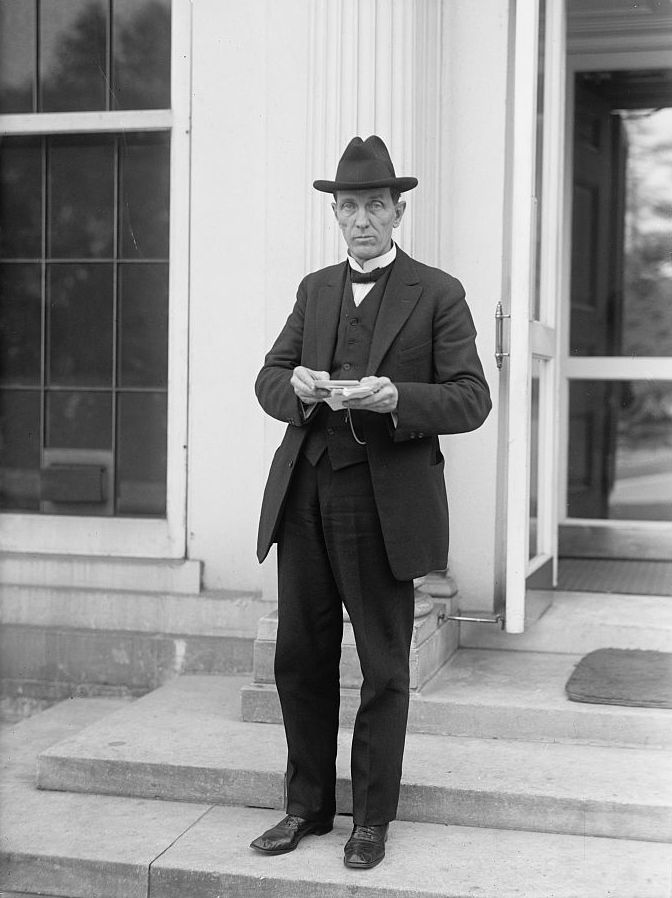

3rd President of Berea College
- In office 1890–1920
- Preceded by: William Boyd Stewart
- Succeeded by: William J. Hutchins

Personal details
- Born: July 2, 1852 Le Roy, New York, U.S.
- Died: September 11, 1938 (aged 86) Berea, Kentucky, U.S.
- Relations: William Goodell (grandfather); Lavinia Goodell (aunt)
- Education: Oberlin College (AB)

William Goodell Frost (July 2, 1854 – September 11, 1938) was an American educator who served as the third president of Berea College from 1890 to 1920, and a scholar of the Greek language. He is credited with coining the phrase "Appalachian American."

== Biography ==
William Goodell Frost was born in Le Roy, New York on July 2, 1854, to Rev. Lewis P. Frost, and Maria Goodell Frost, abolitionist conductors on the Underground Railroad. His grandfather William Goodell was also a notable abolitionist and temperance supporter, and Frost's aunt, Lavinia Goodell, was the first woman licensed to practice law in Wisconsin.

Graduated from Oberlin College in Ohio in 1876, Frost served as a professor of Greek at Oberlin and was ordained as a Congregationalist minister. Frost turned down the presidency of Berea College in 1889 before accepting in 1892. While serving as president, Frost coined the term "Appalachian American" when the school changed its mission from educating black and white students together to simply educating "Appalachian Americans" in response to the segregationist 1904 Day Law and Supreme Court ruling in Berea College v. Kentucky. Berea then formed and funded the Lincoln Institute in Louisville for African American students. Frost stepped down as president of Berea in 1920.

He died at his home on the college campus on September 11, 1938, and was buried at Berea Cemetery.
