= Gott v. Berea College =

- Court: Kentucky Court of Appeals
- Full case name: Gott v. Berea College et al.
- Decided: December 11, 1913
- Citation: 161 S.W. 204, 156 Ky. 376, 1913 Ky. LEXIS 441

Case history
- Appealed from: Circuit Court of Madison County

Case opinions
- Decision by: Thomas Jefferson Nunn

Gott v. Berea College, 161 S.W. 204 (Ky. 1913), was a case heard before the Kentucky Court of Appeals wherein J. S. Gott—a restaurant owner—sued the private institution of Berea College when they issued a new policy in their 1911 student manual that forbid their students from patronizing establishments not owned by the college. Gott believed that the college and its officers had purposely acted unlawfully to injure his business and reputation by enforcing their new policy. The Kentucky Court of Appeals upheld the decision of the lower court of appeals and sided completely with Berea College in this case on the bases of in loco parentis. This was one of the earliest uses of in loco parentis by a private institution and would establish a precedent for decades to come.

== Background ==
Berea College is located in Berea, Kentucky and is a private liberal arts college that falls into the category of work colleges. It was founded in 1855 as the first Southern United States college to be coeducational as well as racially integrated. They would typically release a new Student manual as they saw a need for it when governing their students. Over the 1911 summer vacation, the administration revised the student code. Previously, the student code had forbidden students from entering "any place of ill repute, liquor saloons, gambling houses" or similar places. Beginning with the fall semester, which started September 11, 1911, the college promulgated the updated student code, which forbade students from entering "eating houses and places of amusement in Berea not controlled by the college". The punishment for any violation against the new code was immediate dismissal.

J. S. Gott was a Kentucky Businessman who was born Sep. 1st, 1876 in Virginia and moved to Berea, Kentucky sometime between their birth and 1910 as they are reported to be living in Berea at that time. The exact date is unclear, but around Sep. 1st, 1911, Gott purchased a restaurant across the street from Berea College. This establishment had existed at this location for some years before Gott acquired it. It had sustained itself on the business of the students of the college up till then. Within the coming weeks, this source of business would be forcefully taken away by the updated Student code. This was because of an incident between Sep. 11th and Sep. 20th, where several students were dismissed for patronizing the Gott's establishment. So, on Sep. 20th, Gott would file suit against the college, obtaining an injunction to enjoin enforcement of the rule and initially seeking $500 in damages. He later requested an additional $1,500, claiming that the college had slandered him by telling the student body that Gott was a bootlegger. In the following proceedings, the injunction was dissolved, and Gott's petition was ultimately dismissed. He appealed the dismissal.

== Judgment ==
The court acknowledged that Gott's business had been greatly injured after the rule was effected, but the question was whether the college's actions were unlawful and unreasonable. The court laid out a multipoint conclusion deeply interconnected they came to when analyzing the evidence of the case. First, the court reviewed the question of unreasonable, malicious, or wrongful restraint of trade by the actions of the college. They found no evidence to prove it was anything of the sort. Determined that Berea College was not liable for any of the damages done to Gott's business considering they had made a lawful act in the proper manner.

Next, considering Berea College was acting in loco parentis, the college did have the authority to issue the rule, and students at the college were obligated to conform their behavior to the rule since a "...college or university may prescribe requirements for admission and rules for the conduct of its students, and one who enters as a student impliedly agrees to conform to such rules of government." The court noted that if Berea was a public institution, one supported "from the public treasure" the case would be quite different, but since Berea College was a private institution, the above-implied contract between student and college was sufficient.

Lastly, the court reviewed the relationship between Gott and Berea College to determine if there was any contractual relationship that the college had failed to uphold toward Gott. They found nothing of the sort, they further noted that Gott was not a student of the college nor did he have a child attending the college. The rule was directed at and intended to govern the student body and only the student body. Hence gave him no right to complain nor meant the college owed him any special duty. He had simply been injured by a rule not meant for him. Berea had proven themselves not liable for any of it and acting in a completely lawful and reasonable manner in line with in loco parentis. The court upheld the verdict of the lower court of appeals.

== Significance ==
Gott v. Berea College set a precedent for the use of in loco parentis by Private universities and colleges. There were previous cases that were cited in the case that helped lay some of the grounds that Berea built its defense on, but this case would be looked back at for decades to come. In loco parentis doctrines would stand strong as private and public education's defense for any rules or regulations that would be challenged by students and outside agents.

== See also ==
- Berea College v. Kentucky
- Dixon v. Alabama
