= Bishop State Community College =

College in Mobile, Alabama, U.S.

- Former names: Alabama State College - Mobile Center; Mobile State Junior College; S.D. Bishop State Junior College
- Type: Public historically black community college
- Established: 1927; 99 years ago
- Affiliations: Alabama Community College System
- President: Olivier Charles
- Dean: Dr. Kathryn Pavey
- Location: Mobile, Alabama, United States; 30°41′39″N 88°3′27″W
- Campus: Main Campus Southwest Campus Carver Campus Baker-Gaines Central Campus City of Semmes Training Center Theodore Oaks Shopping Center - Suite B Truck Driving Site
- Nickname: Wildcats
- Sporting affiliations: NJCAA; ACCC
- Website: www.bishop.edu

Bishop State Community College is a public, historically black community college with campuses and facilities throughout Mobile and Washington Counties in Alabama. The college was founded in Mobile, Alabama, in 1927, and is accredited by the Southern Association of Colleges and Schools Commission on Colleges. It offers more than 50 associate degree and certificate programs.

Bishop State's athletic teams compete in the Alabama Community College Conference (ACCC) of the National Junior College Athletic Association (NJCAA). They are collectively known as the Wildcats.

== History ==
Bishop State Community College was founded in 1927 as the Mobile, Alabama, extension of Alabama State College, and initially offered courses to African-American certified teachers. In 1936, it was organized into a two-year college and renamed Alabama State College - Mobile Center, with O.H. Johnson serving as the first dean. In 1965, Alabama legislation officially declared Bishop State Community College a state junior college independent from Alabama State College, and it was renamed Mobile State Junior College. The Alabama State Board of Education renamed the college S.D. Bishop State Junior College for its first president, Dr. Sanford D. Bishop, in 1971. In 1989, the board renamed it Bishop State Community College due to its expanded career, vocational, transfer and community service offerings.

Historically, Bishop State has primarily served the inner-city residents of Mobile and Prichard, Alabama to prepare them for open industry positions and career advancement.

== Campus ==
Bishop State has one on-site campus and several on-site instructional sites in Mobile County. Its five off-site locations are high schools throughout Mobile and Washington Counties.

=== Mobile Campuses ===
==== Main Campus ====
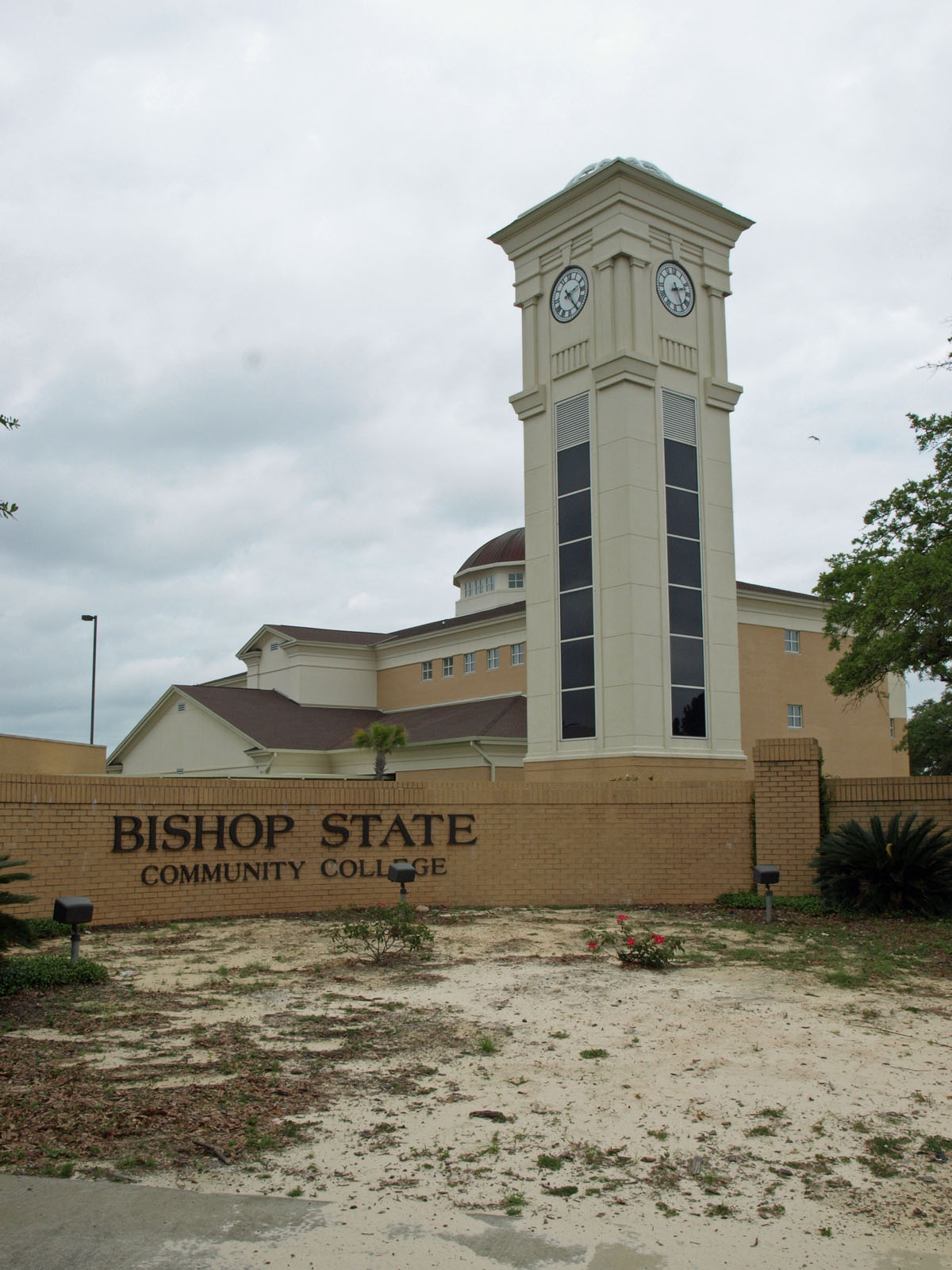
The campus in 2012

Main Campus is located at 351 North Broad Street. It contains 14 buildings and covers 15 acres (0.061 km^{2}). The campus was acquired in 1942, making it Bishop State's original building when the college was first established.

As of February 2021, the Mobile County Commission approved $350,000 to fund the construction of the Advanced Manufacturing Center and Health Sciences Facility on Main Campus. The 80,000-square-foot (7,400 m^{2}) Advanced Manufacturing Center is designed for skilled workforce development training grounds for careers in process technology, industrial maintenance, electronics engineering technology and robotics, among others. The Health Sciences Facility will include a 1,150 square foot (107 m^{2}) nursing simulation site to train nursing students in patient care. Both buildings were scheduled to open in fall 2021.

==== Southwest Instructional Site ====
Southwest Campus is located at 925 Dauphin Island Parkway. Established in 1947 as Southwest State Technical College, a vocational school, it was consolidated into Bishop State Community College in 1991. The campus covers 42 acres (0.17 km^{2}) and contains seven buildings.

==== Carver Instructional Site ====
Carver Campus is located at 414 Stanton Road. Established in 1962 as Carver State Technical College, a vocational school, it was consolidated into Bishop State Community College in 1991. The campus covers 9 acres (0.036 km^{2}) and contains six buildings.

==== Formerly Baker-Gaines Central Campus ====
The Former Baker-Gaines Central Campus is located at 1365 Dr. Martin Luther King, Jr. Avenue. In 1995, the Mobile County School Board sold the campus, formerly Central High School, to Bishop State for one dollar. The two-story building sits on 5 acres (0.020 km^{2}). It is home to the Division of Health Related Professions, a museum with Central High School and early Bishop State artifacts, a child-care center, bookstore, multimedia center, cafeteria facilities and a 1,200-seat auditorium.

==== City of Semmes Training Center ====
The Semmes location is at 9010 Forest Street in Semmes, Alabama. The facility offers Art, English, Math, Psychology and Speech Communication program courses.

==== Theodore Oaks Shopping Center - Suite B ====
The Theodore location is at 5808 US-90 in Theodore, Alabama. The facility offers Art, English, Math, Psychology and Speech Communication program courses.

==== Truck Driving Site ====
The Truck Driving Site is located at 4551 Halls Mill Road in Mobile. It houses Bishop State's commercial driver's license training program.

== Administration and organization ==
Bishop State operates under five divisions: Academic Transfer (general education), Health Science Professions, Career Technical Education, Adult Education/GED and Workforce Development.

A typical academic year contains two 15-week terms during the fall (August–December) and spring (January–May). Within the terms are two four-week accelerated sessions or mini terms. The full summer term is ten weeks long (May-August). An academic year begins on the first day of the fall term and ends on the last day of the summer term.

Bishop State's endowment had a market value of approximately $152,000 in the fiscal year that ended in 2019.

== Academics and programs ==
Bishop State has an open admissions policy. The college offers dual enrollment programs to local high school students. In addition to its associate and certificate degree programs, Bishop State offers personal enrichment, professional enhancement and career training courses.

Bishop State has transfer agreements with every public four-year institution in Alabama. The agreements allow students to automatically transfer after completing an associate degree at Bishop State Community College.

Bishop State is a Student Support Services TRIO program participant. The government-funded program helps educationally disadvantaged and disabled students graduate from college and supports low-income and first-generation college students in achieving their career and economic goals.

== Student Life ==
=== Student body ===
As of fall 2020, Bishop State's student body consists of 2,176 students. There are 35 percent full time and 65 percent part time students.

Demographics of student body in fall 2020
	Full and Part Time Students	U.S. Census (Note: People who identify as Hispanic/Latino are included in applicable race categories.)
International	2%	N/A
Multiracial American	4%	2.8%
Black/African American	57%	13.4%
American Indian and Alaska Native	1%	1.3%
Asian	2%	5.9%
Non-Hispanic White American	29%	60.1%
Hispanic/Latino American	2%	18.5%
Native Hawaiian and Other Pacific Islander	0%	0.2%
Other/Unknown	3%	N/A

=== Organizations ===
Several student clubs and organizations operate at Bishop State Community College, including honors societies and student government, special interest and service organizations. Campus groups include: Barbering and Hair Styling Association, College Choir, International Student Organization, Pep Squad and STEM Club.

=== Athletics ===
The Bishop State athletic association chairs six varsity athletic programs. The teams are collectively known as the Wildcats, and belong to the Alabama Community College Conference (ACCC) and Region 22 of the National Junior College Athletic Association (NJCAA). Men's sports include: basketball, baseball and golf. Women's sports include: basketball, fast-pitch softball and volleyball.

== Notable alumni ==
- Thomas Figures first African American assistant district attorney and assistant United States Attorney
- Mel Showers, retired WKRG news anchor
- Jessie Tompkins, former nationally-ranked track & field athlete who led lawsuit against Whites-only scholarships at Alabama State University

== See also ==
- List of historically black colleges and universities
