= Day Law =

Former Kentucky segregation law

The Day Law mandated racial segregation in educational institutions in Kentucky. Formally designated "An Act to Prohibit White and Colored Persons from Attending the Same School," the bill was introduced in the Kentucky House of Representatives by Carl Day (D) in January 1904, and signed into law by Governor J.C.W. Beckham in March 1904. As well as prohibiting students of color from attending the same school as white students, the law prohibited individual schools from operating separate black and white branches within 25 miles of each other.

Berea College at the time was the only integrated college in Kentucky. As the bill was being debated in the Kentucky House of Representatives Committee on Education, two groups came to Frankfort to lobby the legislators. One group was led by Berea College President William G. Frost and his wife to protest the bill while the other group was led by Berea's Democrat Club president, J.M. Early, to speak in support of the bill. State Superintendent of Education Harry McChesney also spoke in favor of the bill.

Berea College was criminally convicted and fined $1,000. The Court of Appeals of Kentucky denied Berea College's appeal, agreeing with the Kentucky General Assembly on the law's purpose, that of preventing racial violence and interracial marriage.

In 1908, the US Supreme Court affirmed the legitimacy of Commonwealth's right to prohibit individuals and corporations from operating integrated schools. The decision in Berea College v. Kentucky extended the 1896 opinion in Plessy v. Ferguson to include colleges and universities specifically on the grounds that they were charted by the state. The Kentucky Justice John Marshall Harlan dissented, as he had done with Plessy v. Ferguson, as he thought that it was unconstitutional under the Fourteenth Amendment's Due Process Clause and was a governmental intrusion on citizens' private lives. The Supreme Court, fifty years later, took a position similar to Justice Harlan in its ruling on Brown v. Board of Education, Topeka.

The trustees of Berea College worked to build a new college that would serve the needs of Kentucky's black students seeking higher education. With a challenge grant of $200,000 from Andrew Carnegie, the trustees raised the matching funds and purchased 444.4 ac of farmland in Shelby County. By the fall of 1912, the Lincoln Institute opened its doors to its first students. By the 1930s, however, the junior college courses were no longer offered. The historically black college in Frankfort, which eventually would become Kentucky State University, had taken on a stronger role in black higher education. Lincoln Institute's students could take only vocational and college preparatory courses until it closed in 1966.

The Kentucky Department of Education created in 1924 a Division of Negro Education.

The Day Law became illegal upon the Supreme Court's decision in 1954 in the landmark case, Brown v. Board of Education, Topeka.

== See also ==
- Berea College v. Kentucky
- Judicial aspects of race in the U.S.: the civil rights movement
- List of Jim Crow law examples by State: Kentucky
- Racial segregation in the United States
- Timeline of the civil rights movement
