= Mel Showers =

American journalist and news presenter (1946–2024)

- Born: 1946; Mobile, Alabama, U.S.
- Died: October 19, 2024 (aged 78)
- Education: Central High School, Mobile, AL, Military Intelligence Academy, Bishop State Community College, Career Academy of Broadcasting, University of South Alabama
- Occupations: Journalist; news presenter
- Years active: 1969–2019

Melvin J. Showers (1946 – October 19, 2024) was an American journalist and news presenter. He is best known for his work at WKRG-TV in his hometown of Mobile, Alabama. In his early life, Showers worked in the military as an Intelligence Analyst in the Far East, Middle East, and other territories. Upon his return stateside, he started his broadcasting career at WKRG in 1969. He served in several different roles, including announcer and reporter, before becoming a lead news anchor in 1980.

Showers was among the first people of color to anchor a newscast on the Gulf Coast, breaking racial barriers. He retired from full-time work at WKRG in 2019 after fifty years. For his career in broadcasting, he was inducted into Alabama's Broadcasting Hall of Fame, and named a "Journalist of Distinction" by the National Association of Black Journalists.

== Early life and career ==
Showers was born on the north side of Mobile, Alabama in 1946. After graduating high school, he joined the United States Air Force, where he served as a Military Intelligence Analyst in the Far East, Middle East, and other territories.

He joined the team at local television station WKRG-TV in 1969, working part-time. He began employment full-time in March 1970, working as a booth announcer, providing live station identification and reading live commercials. In 1974, he transitioned to become a reporter for the station's newscast, Newscenter 5. As a reporter, he covered the police, the school board, and local government. He was, according to the Lagniappe, often the first individual on the scene of large news stories. Among the major stories he covered in Mobile during that era were Hurricane Frederic in 1979 and the lynching of Michael Donald in 1981.

That year, Showers was named co-anchor of the morning edition of Newscenter 5. By 1990, he moved to the evening newscasts, anchoring the 6pm and 10pm broadcasts. In 2019, he announced his retirement; his final broadcast took place on May 22, 2019. He will take the title of "Anchor Emeritus", returning for "occasional special reports. He will also provide his unique perspective on events impacting the Gulf Coast."

== Personal life and death ==
Showers was married to Linda Reed Showers from 1968 until her death in 2012. He died on October 19, 2024, at the age of 78.

== Education ==
- Central High School, Mobile, AL
- Military Intelligence Academy, San Angelo, TX
- Bishop State Community College, Mobile, AL
- Career Academy of Broadcasting, Houston, TX
- University of South Alabama, Mobile, AL

== Awards and recognition ==
Showers was a winner of the Mobile Press Club Lifetime Achievement Award, and was inducted into Alabama's Broadcasting Hall of Fame in 2015. He was named a "Journalist of Distinction" by the National Association of Black Journalists in 2019, with the press release detailing Showers' history in broadcasting:

Showers is celebrated for breaking down barriers for journalists of color in his region, as he [was] the first black, full-time anchor to appear on WKRG. Although some in the community did not initially welcome the station's first black evening news anchor with open arms, his endearing smile, passionate reporting and engagement with the community allowed him to turn hate mail into fan mail, according to the Alabama Broadcasters Association. Today, he is beloved by viewers across the Gulf Coast.
