= Jessie Tompkins =

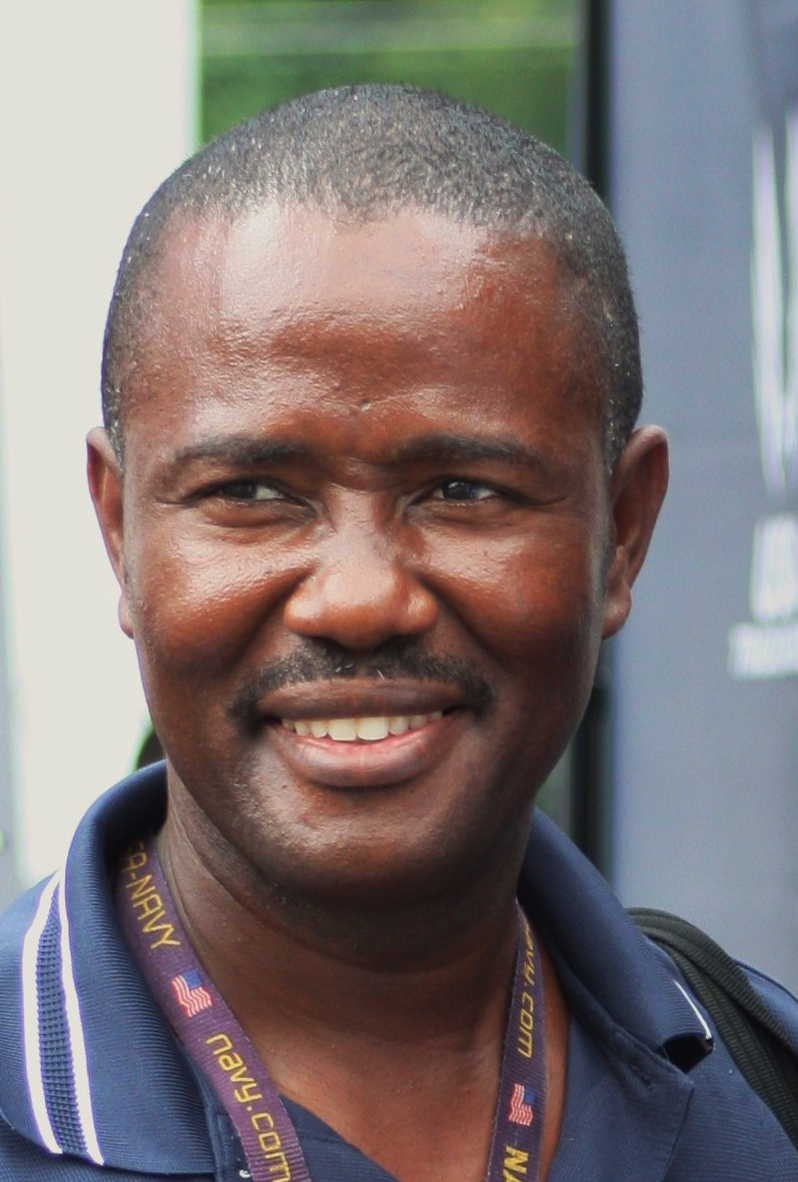
- Tompkins in 2009

Sport
- College team: South Alabama Jaguars

Jessie Tompkins is a US athlete and educator from Bessemer, Alabama. Jesse Tompkins attended and ran track for the University of South Alabama in Mobile, Alabama and later graduated from Bishop State Community College in Mobile, Alabama and the United States Sports Academy in Daphne, Alabama and later from Alabama State University in Montgomery.

== Track and field career ==
Tompkins led the nation in the indoor 50-yard hurdles (42-inch) and the outdoor 400-meter hurdles in 1979 in high school. He led the nation in the junior college 400-meter hurdles and ranked among the top 50 U.S hurdlers in 1981, according to Track and Field News. He organized and developed the East Montgomery Track Club for youths in rural Montgomery, Alabama.

=== Personal best marks ===
- 50-yard hurdles: 6.35, 1979
- 60-meter hurdles: 7.51 s, 1982
- 500 m dash 63.4 s, 1984
- Long jump: 7.56 meters (24 ft, 8.25 in), 1980
- 110 m hurdles: 14.0 s, 1984
- 400 m hurdles: 50.6 s, 1981
- 4 × 400 m relay: 45.08 s, 1982

== Alabama State scholarship controversy ==
In 1997, he was the lead plaintiff in the Tompkins v. Alabama State University lawsuit, and one of four African American students who filed a lawsuit to eliminate racial requirements for the all-white scholarship program at Alabama State University.

Tompkins's case was featured in the Wall Street Journal in an article presented by an American journalist, June Kronholz.
