= Carl Day =

American politician

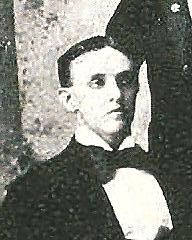
- Day, c. 1898

Member of the Kentucky House of Representatives from the 92nd district
- In office January 1, 1904 – April 12, 1904
- Preceded by: John P. Adams
- Succeeded by: John C. Griffith

Personal details
- Born: April 1875 Frozen Creek, Kentucky
- Died: April 12, 1904 Lexington, Kentucky
- Resting place: Day Cemetery; Jackson, Kentucky
- Party: Democratic
- Relations: Walter R. Day (brother)
- Education: Central University

Carl Day (April 1875 – April 12, 1904) was an American politician who represented Breathitt, Lee, and Magoffin Counties in the Kentucky House of Representatives for three months in 1904 before dying in office. He is known for introducing the Day Law, which mandated racial segregation in privately owned educational institutions.

== Early life and education ==
Prior to running for office, Day grew up in Frozen Creek, Kentucky located in Breathitt County. Day's father was Judge Nathan B. Day. In 1900, his brother Walter R. Day served as Kentucky State Treasurer under Governor William S. Taylor.

In 1895, Day began attending Central University. He was a member of Sigma Nu as well as various other student organizations, and was compared to Demosthenes in his freshman yearbook for his apparent oratorical abilities.

By 1901, Day was serving as Frozen Creek's postmaster.

== Political career ==
=== Day Law ===
Day claimed to have been motivated by a November 1903 trip to Berea, Kentucky — home of Berea College, which was Kentucky's only racially integrated educational institution — where he witnessed an interracial embrace between two female students.

Historian T. R. C. Hutton has noted that, although "various commentators [have] blamed" the Day law on "Carl Day's egregious personal racism or his personal vendetta towards Berea College," it may also — or instead — have been a ploy meant to increase the influence of Day's extended family in Breathitt County: "more a cynical political maneuver than a sincere attack on integration." Hutton has also pointed out that Day's only other bill was one which allowed timberland owners to deny right of way to adjoining lands, thereby making it impossible for smaller landowners to reach markets or bodies of water — a "final nail in the coffin for the (...) free-ranging mountain economy".

== Death ==
In March 1904, Day began experiencing symptoms of "inflammatory rheumatism" and was hospitalized. He died of pneumonia on April 12, 1904. His funeral was conducted by the Elks Lodge and Knights of Pythias, after which he was interred in his family's cemetery in Breathitt County.
