= Frozen Creek, Kentucky =

Unincorporated community in Kentucky, United States

Frozen Creek
- Unincorporated community
- Location within the state of Kentucky Frozen Creek (the United States)
- Coordinates: 37°35′28″N 83°25′19″W
- Country: United States
- State: Kentucky
- County: Breathitt
- Elevation: 725 ft (221 m)
- Time zone: UTC-6 (Central (CST))
  - Summer (DST): UTC-5 (CST)
- ZIP codes: 41326
- GNIS feature ID: 508046

Frozen Creek is an unincorporated community in Breathitt County, Kentucky, United States. Its post office closed in 1983.

The first post office was established in the community in 1850. It was likely named Frozen Creek for a section of the local creek of the same name that early settlers often found treacherous in the winter.
