= Berea College v. Kentucky =

- Supreme Court of the United States

Argued April 10, 13, 1908 Decided November 9, 1908
- Full case name: Berea College, Plaintiff in Error, v. Commonwealth of Kentucky
- Citations: 211 U.S. 45 (more) 29 S. Ct. 33; 53 L. Ed. 81

Case history
- Prior: Affirmed, 123 Ky. 209, 94 S.W. 623. Reviewed by the Supreme Court on writ of error.

Holding
- States can legally prohibit private educational institutions chartered as corporations from admitting both black and white students.

Court membership
- Chief Justice Melville Fuller Associate Justices John M. Harlan · David J. Brewer; Edward D. White · Rufus W. Peckham; Joseph McKenna · Oliver W. Holmes Jr. William R. Day · William H. Moody

Case opinions
- Majority: Brewer, joined by Fuller, White, Peckham, McKenna
- Concurrence: Holmes (in the judgment of the court only)
- Concurrence: Moody (in the judgment of the court only)
- Dissent: Harlan
- Dissent: Day
- Overruled by
- Brown v. Board of Education (1954)

Berea College v. Kentucky, 211 U.S. 45 (1908), was a significant case argued before the United States Supreme Court that upheld the rights of states to prohibit private educational institutions chartered as corporations from admitting both black and white students. Like the related Plessy v. Ferguson case, it was also marked by a strongly worded dissent by John Marshall Harlan. The ruling also is a minor landmark on the nature of corporate personhood.

== Background ==
Berea College is a private liberal arts work college in Berea, Kentucky. It was founded in 1855 as a coeducational and desegregated school, admitting both black and white students and treating them without discrimination. In 1904, the "Day Law" (named for Carl Day, a Democrat from Breathitt County, Kentucky who had introduced the bill in the Kentucky House of Representatives) was passed by the Kentucky legislature, prohibiting any person, group of people, or corporation from the teaching of black and white students in the same school, or from running separate branches of a school for the teaching of black and white students within twenty-five miles of each other. Since at the time Berea was the only such integrated school in Kentucky (and the only such college in the South), it was clearly the target of this law. After Berea College's challenge to the law failed before the Kentucky Court of Appeals (although the distance provision was struck down), the case was appealed to the U.S. Supreme Court.

== Opinion of the Court ==
The Supreme Court ruled in favor of the state. Justice Brewer delivered the main opinion that as the corporation in question was chartered under the laws of the state of Kentucky, it was within the rights of the state to make such prohibition to the college. While the state might not have the right to thus restrict the actions of private individuals, that portion of the law was a separate issue, and not under direct consideration; and that the rights and restrictions on individuals were not necessarily the same as for corporations.

Justice Harlan vigorously dissented, arguing that the formal title of the law, "An Act to Prohibit White and Colored Persons from Attending the Same School," and the nature of its provisions made clear that no such distinction between individual and corporate restriction existed in the intentions of the legislators, and that the separate consideration of those aspects of the law was not appropriate. Harlan furthermore declared, "The capacity to impart instruction to others is given by the Almighty for beneficent purposes and its use may not be forbidden or interfered with by Government—certainly not, unless such instruction is, in its nature, harmful to the public morals or imperils the public safety. The right to impart instruction, harmless in itself or beneficial to those who receive it, is a substantial right of property—especially, where the services are rendered for compensation. But even if such right be not strictly a property right, it is, beyond question, part of one's liberty as guaranteed against hostile state action by the Constitution of the United States."

Justice Day also dissented, separately from Harlan, but did not write a dissenting opinion.

== Subsequent developments ==
The result of the ruling was to allow states to prohibit integrated schooling in private institutions, as well as in public schools. Kentucky eventually amended the Day Law in 1950 to allow voluntary integration, shortly prior to the Brown v. Board of Education case which struck down racial segregation.

== See also ==
- Civil Rights Cases, 109 U.S. 3 (1883)
- Gott v. Berea College
