= Dixon v. Alabama =

Federal court case about due process for students

- Court: United States Court of Appeals for the Fifth Circuit
- Full case name: St. John Dixon, et al. v. Alabama State Board of Education, et al.
- Decided: August 4, 1961
- Citation: 294 F.2d 150

Case history
- Prior history: Dixon v. Alabama, 186 F. Supp. 945 (M.D. Ala. 1960)

Holding
- That students at public institutions of higher education cannot be disciplined without due process, including notice of their alleged violations and an opportunity to be heard.

Court membership
- Judges sitting: Benjamin Franklin Cameron, Richard Rives, John Minor Wisdom

Case opinions
- Majority: Rives, joined by Wisdom
- Dissent: Cameron

Laws applied
- 14th Amendment to the United States Constitution

Dixon v. Alabama, 294 F.2d 150 (5th Cir. 1961) was a landmark 1961 U.S. federal court decision that spelled the end of the doctrine that colleges and universities could act in loco parentis to discipline or expel their students. It has been called "the leading case on due process for students in public higher education".

The case arose when Alabama State College, a then-segregated black college, expelled six students, including the named appellant, John Dixon, for unspecified reasons, but presumably because of their participation in demonstrations during the Civil Rights Movement. The college, acting in loco parentis, expelled them without a hearing. The case was appealed to the Fifth Circuit, which held that a public college could not expel students without at least minimal due process.

The case was heard by a panel of John Minor Wisdom, Richard Rives, and Benjamin Franklin Cameron. Cameron dissented from the opinion of the court.

Thurgood Marshall, Fred Gray, Derrick Bell and Jack Greenberg were among the counsel for the appellants.

== See also ==
- Tompkins v. Alabama State University

== Bibliography ==
- Hoover, Eric (September 5, 2008), "'Animal House' at 30: O Bluto, Where Art Thou?", The Chronicle of Higher Education, vol. 55, no. 2, pp. 1, 34–35
- Smith, Wilson; Bender, Thomas (2008), American Higher Education Transformed, 1940–2005, JHU Press, p. 521, ISBN 978-0-8018-8671-3
