= In loco parentis =

Legal term – "in the place of a parent"

The term in loco parentis, Latin for "in the place of a parent", refers to the legal responsibility of a person or organization to take on some of the functions and responsibilities of a parent.

Originally derived from English common law, the doctrine is applied in two separate areas of the law. First, it grants educational institutions such as colleges and schools discretion to act in the best interests of their students, although not allowing what would be considered violations of the students' civil liberties. Second, this doctrine may allow a non-biological parent to exercise the legal rights and responsibilities of a biological parent if they have held themselves out as the parent.

The in loco parentis doctrine is distinct from the doctrine of parens patriae, the psychological parent doctrine, and adoption.

== Situation specific ==
=== Education ===
==== Primary and secondary education ====
Cheadle Hulme School, originally known as the Manchester Warehousemen and Clerks Orphans Schools, formed in 1855, adopted in loco parentis as its motto, well before the world's first public education act, the Elementary Education Act 1870 (33 & 34 Vict. c. 75).

The first major limitation to this came in the U.S. Supreme Court case West Virginia State Board of Education v. Barnette (1943), in which the court ruled that students cannot be forced to salute the American flag. More prominent change came in the 1960s and 1970s in such cases as Tinker v. Des Moines Independent Community School District (1969), when the Supreme Court decided that "conduct by the student, in class or out of it, which for any reason – whether it stems from time, place, or type of behavior – materially disrupts classwork or involves substantial disorder or invasion of the rights of others is, of course, not immunized by the constitutional guarantee of freedom of speech." Adult speech is also limited by "time, place and manner" restrictions and therefore such limits do not rely on schools acting in loco parentis.

In Tinker v. Des Moines Independent Community School District (1969), the Supreme Court held that for school officials to justify censoring speech, they "must be able to show that [their] action was caused by something more than a mere desire to avoid the discomfort and unpleasantness that always accompany an unpopular viewpoint," allowing schools to forbid conduct that would "materially and substantially interfere with the requirements of appropriate discipline in the operation of the school." The court found that the actions of the Tinkers in wearing armbands did not cause disruption and held that their activity represented constitutionally protected symbolic speech.

In New Jersey v. T. L. O. (1985) Justice White wrote:

In carrying out searches and other disciplinary functions pursuant to such policies, school officials act as representatives of the State, not merely as surrogates for the parents, and they cannot claim the parents' immunity from the strictures of the Fourth Amendment.

The case upheld the search of a purse while on public school property based upon reasonable suspicion, indicating there is a balancing between the student's legitimate expectation of privacy and the public school's interest in maintaining order and discipline. However, in Hazelwood School District v. Kuhlmeier (1987) the Supreme Court ruled that "First Amendment rights of students in public schools are not automatically coextensive with the rights of adults in other settings, and must be applied in light of the special characteristics of the school environment" and schools may censor school-sponsored publications (such as a school newspaper) if content is "...inconsistent with its basic educational mission." Other student issues such as school dress codes along with locker, cell phone, and personal laptop computer searches by public school officials have not yet been tested in the Supreme Court.

Private institutions are given significantly more authority over their students than public ones, and are generally allowed to arbitrarily dictate rules. In the Kentucky State Supreme Court case Gott v. Berea College (1913), it was upheld that a "college or university may prescribe requirements for admission and rules for the conduct of its students, and one who enters as a student implicitly agrees to conform to such rules of government", while publicly funded institutions could not claim the same ability.

In Morse v. Frederick (2007) Justice Clarence Thomas, concurring with the majority, argued that Tinker's ruling contradicted "the traditional understanding of the judiciary's role in relation to public schooling," and ignored the history of public education. He believed the judiciary's role to determine whether students have freedom of expression was limited by in loco parentis. He cited Lander v. Seaver (1859), which held that in loco parentis allowed schools to punish student expression that the school or teacher believed contradicted the school's interests and educational goals. This ruling declared that the only restriction the doctrine imposed were acts of legal malice or acts that caused permanent injury. Neither of these was the case with Tinker.

==== Higher education ====
Though in loco parentis continues to apply to primary and secondary education in the U.S., application of the concept has largely disappeared in higher education. This was not always the case.

Prior to the 1960s, undergraduates were subject to many restrictions on their private lives. Women were generally subject to curfews as early as 10 pm, and dormitories were sex-segregated. Some universities expelled students—especially female students—who were deemed "morally" undesirable. More importantly, universities saw fit to restrict freedom of speech, on campus, often forbidding organizations out of favor or with different views from speaking, organizing, demonstrating, or otherwise acting on campus. These restrictions were severely criticized by the student movements of the 1960s, and the Free Speech Movement at the University of California, Berkeley formed partly on account of them, inspiring students elsewhere to step up their opposition.

The landmark 1961 case Dixon v. Alabama was the beginning of the end for in loco parentis in U.S. higher education. The United States Court of Appeals for the Fifth Circuit found that Alabama State College could not summarily expel students without due process. However, that still does not prevent students who exercise their rights from being subject to legal action for violation of institutional rules.

=== Hospital and nursing homes ===
Caregivers and management have the duty of care in place of the parent.

In the absence of parents, another relative or person in loco parentis can give consent for children. For children in care, the local authority usually has full parental rights and the director of social services or deputy needs to sign the consent form. If the child is in voluntary care, the parents still act as guardians and their consent should be obtained.

In law, parents have responsibility for their child. Staff have an ethical duty to ensure that the care of the child is equally good no matter the educational attainments of the parents. On rare occasions, however, physician is faced with parents whose level of literacy or understanding prevents them from properly grasping what is happening. Sometimes other members of the family may be able to act in loco parentis, and it is reassuring to have supportive grandparents who can make rational suggestions in the best interests of all concerned. Occasionally, it may be necessary to formalize this arrangement. If there is any doubt about who carries parental responsibility, or competence, the child-safeguarding team must be involved.

== Country specific ==
=== India ===
Indian law has provision for in loco parentis. Under Indian law non-human entities such as animals, trusts (including those established for estate planning), charitable organizations, corporations, managing bodies, etc. and several other non-human entitles have been given the status of "legal person" with legal rights and duties, such as to sue and be sued, to own and transfer the property, to pay taxes, etc. In court cases regarding animals, the animals have the status of "legal person" and humans have the legal duty to act as "loco parentis" towards animals welfare like a parent has towards the minor children. In a case of cow-smuggling, the Punjab and Haryana High Court mandated that "entire animal kingdom including avian and aquatic" species has a "distinct legal persona with corresponding rights, duties, and liabilities of a living person" and humans are "loco parentis" while laying out the norms for animal welfare, veterinary treatment, fodder and shelter, e.g. animal drawn carriages must not have more than four humans, and load carrying animals must not be loaded beyond the specified limits and those limits must be halved when animals have to carry the load up a slope.

== See also ==
- Locum
- Next friend
- Babysitting
