= Tompkins v. Alabama State University =

Legal case involving affirmative action

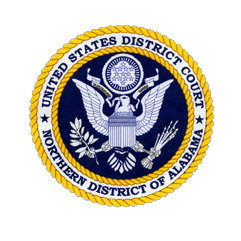
- Court: United States District Court for the Northern District of Alabama
- Full case name: Jesse Tompkins, Audra Beasley, James W. Scott, Rodney Smith v. Alabama State University, Alabama State University Board of Trustees, State of Alabama, Dr. William H. Harris, President of Alabama State University, Dr. Roosevelt Steptoe, President of Academic Affairs, Director of Student Activities, Governor Fob James, Ex–Officio President, Joe L. Reed, Chairman, Frankye U. Underwood, Vice Chairwoman, Richard Arrington, Jr., B. Maxine Corley, James C. Cox, LaRue W. Harding, Toreatha M. Johnson, Larry H. Keener, Patsy D. Parker, Donald V. Watkins
- Decided: May 1, 1998
- Docket nos.: 97-M-1482-S
- Citation: 15 F. Supp. 2d 1160

Case history
- Subsequent actions: Affirmed, 174 F.3d 203 (11th Cir. 1999); cert. denied, 120 S. Ct. 55 (1999).
- Related actions: Knight v. Alabama, 787 F. Supp. 1030 (N.D. Ala. 1991); 900 F. Supp. 272 (N.D. Ala. 1995).

Court membership
- Judge sitting: Harold Lloyd Murphy

Tompkins v. Alabama State University, 15 F. Supp. 2d 1160 (N.D. Ala. 1998), was a legal case involving affirmative action, that was decided in a United States Federal Court.

This was the first case filed by an African American student to challenge the existing race-based affirmative action admission policy at Alabama State University (ASU) in Montgomery, Alabama. In Tompkins, four black applicants who had been rejected for the Alabama State University white-only scholarship program filed suit to challenge the institution's admissions policy on equal protection grounds, and their case prevailed. To Tompkins, the issue was a simple one: "They said I have to be white and I can't be." "It's strange," says Tompkins. "You have a historically black institution giving scholarships to whites to remedy discrimination."

== History ==
=== The Knight litigation ===
Knight v. Alabama commenced on January 15, 1981, when John F. Knight Jr., and a class of other alumni, students, and faculty members of Alabama State University (ASU) filed suit in the Northern District of Alabama to attack alleged vestiges of segregation in public higher education. The court held two trials, resulting in the 1991 Knight I opinion and 1995 Knight II opinion.

=== The Tompkins litigation ===
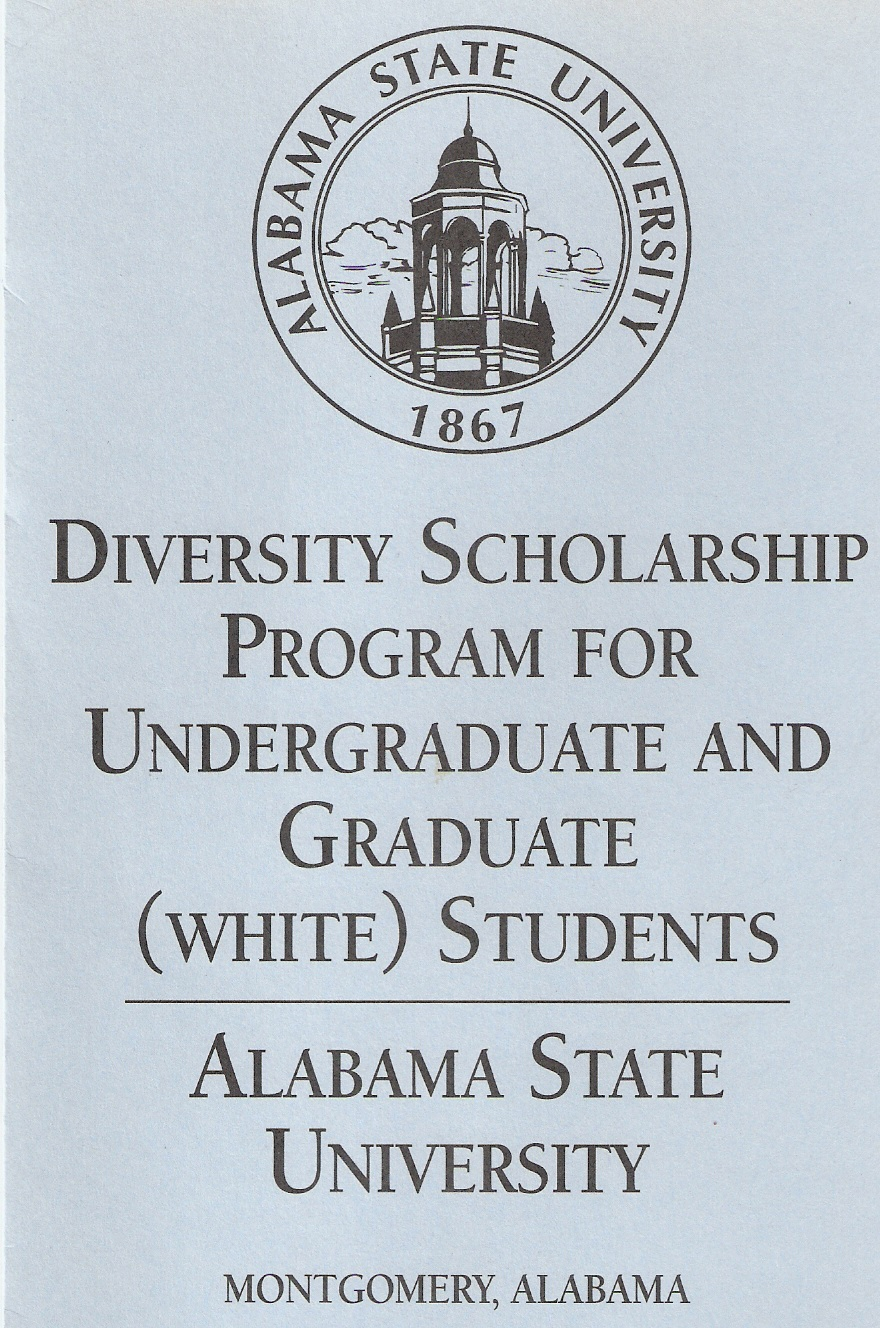
White-Only Scholarship Brochure used by ASU to recruit white student only. The university awarded 40% of its budget for academic grants to whites.

Tompkins posing in front of U.S. Federal Court House Montgomery, Alabama

On October 1, 1997, Plaintiffs Jessie Tompkins, Audra Beasley, James W. Scott, and Rodney Smith filed the Tompkins lawsuit on behalf of all non-white individuals similarly situated to Plaintiffs. The plaintiffs were influenced by Hopwood v. Texas, which was the first successful legal challenge to a university's affirmative action policy in student admissions since Regents of the University of California v. Bakke.

In the Plaintiff's second amended complaint, the plaintiffs outlined class action grounds to eliminate the scholarship's race requirement. The Plaintiffs presented themselves as non-represented black citizens of the State of Alabama, and thus are members of the class certified in the Knight litigation. Plaintiffs claim that the "other-race" scholarships created at Alabama State pursuant to the Court's 1995 Decree in Knight II violate their rights under the Fourteenth Amendment to the United States Constitution and the rights guaranteed by 42 U. S. C. Sections 2000d, 1981 and 1983 of the Civil Rights Act. The Plaintiffs named as Defendants the State of Alabama, ASU, the ASU Board of Trustees, and various ASU administrators. The Plaintiffs sought to certify this case as a class action pursuant to Federal Rules of Civil Procedure, Parts 23(b)(2) and 23(b)(3).

On May 1, 1998, Judge Harold Lloyd Murphy dismissed the Thompson case without prejudice, holding that Tompkins should be permitted to intervene in the ongoing Knight litigation rather than pursue a separate claim. The Eleventh Circuit summarily affirmed Judge Murphy's decision, and the Supreme Court denied certiorari.

== Subsequent developments ==
In August 2000, the University and Tompkins failed to settle the case. Tompkins rejected the proposed settlement because he believed that it allowed the University to change the language of the scholarship program's literature, without actually altering who would receive scholarships. Although it was not resolved, the case raised pivotal questions: Should publicly funded historically Black universities offer (to other races) scholarships to diversify their institutions? And, will other-race scholarships guide historically Black universities away from their historical mission?

== See also ==
- Dixon v. Alabama
