= List of American composers =

This is a list of American composers, alphabetically sorted by surname. It is by no means complete. It is not limited by classifications such as genre or time period—however, it includes only music composers of significant fame, notability or importance. Some further composers are included in Category:American composers.

== A ==
- Maurice Abrahams (1883–1931)
- Mark Adamo (born 1962)
- Alton Adams (1889–1987)
- H. Leslie Adams (1932–2024)
- John Adams (born 1947)
- John Luther Adams (born 1953)
- Samuel Adler (born 1928)
- Bruce Adolphe (born 1955)
- Milton Adolphus (1913–1988)
- Miguel del Águila (born 1957)
- Howard E. Akers (1913–1984)
- Stephen Albert (1941–1992)
- Mark Alburger (born 1957)
- Russell Alexander (1877–1915)
- Esther Allan (1914–1985)
- Tori Amos (born 1963)
- David Amram (born 1930)
- Beth Anderson (born 1950)
- Leroy Anderson (1908–1975)
- T. J. Anderson (born 1928)
- John Antes (1740–1811)
- George Antheil (1900–1959)
- Alfredo Antonini (1901–1983)
- Frederic Archer (1838–1901)
- Dominick Argento (1927–2019)
- Harold Arlen (1905–1986)
- Felix Arndt (1889–1918)
- Robert Ashley (1930–2014)
- May Aufderheide (1888–1972)
- Larry Austin (1930–2018)
- Frederick Ayres (1876–1926)

== B ==
- Milton Babbitt (1916–2011)
- Burt Bacharach (1928–2023)
- Ernst Bacon (1898–1990)
- David Baker (1931–2016)
- Leonardo Balada (born 1933)
- Edward Ballantine (1886–1971)
- George Barati (1913–1996)
- Samuel Barber (1910–1981)
- Wayne Barlow (1912–1996)
- Matthew Barnson (born 1979)
- Marion Bauer (1882–1955)
- Amy Beach (1867–1944)
- Robert Beadell (1925–1994)
- Jeff Beal (born 1963)
- Emily Bear (born 2001)
- Robert Beaser (born 1954)
- Jeremy Beck (born 1960)
- Johann H. Beck (1856–1924)
- John J. Becker (1886–1961)
- Jack Beeson (1921–2010)
- Jeanne Behrend (1911–1988)
- Supply Belcher (1751–1836)
- Robert Russell Bennett (1894–1981)
- Arthur Berger (1912–2003)
- Jonathan Berger (born 1954)
- William Bergsma (1921–1994)
- Irving Berlin (1888–1989)
- Derek Bermel (born 1967)
- Elmer Bernstein (1922–2004)
- Leonard Bernstein (1918–1990)
- Philip Bezanson (1916–1975)
- Lisa Bielawa (born 1968)
- William Billings (1746–1800)
- Phillip Bimstein (born 1947)
- Seth Bingham (1882–1972)
- Arthur H. Bird (1856–1923)
- Easley Blackwood Jr. (1933–2023)
- Eubie Blake (1883–1983)
- Carla Bley (1936–2023)
- Marc Blitzstein (1905–1964)
- Ernest Bloch (1880–1959)
- Dušan Bogdanović (born 1955)
- William Bolcom (born 1938)
- Margaret Bonds (1913–1972)
- Francis Boott (1813–1904)
- David Borden (born 1938)
- Benjamin Boretz (born 1934)
- George Botsford (1874–1949)
- Roger Bourland (born 1952)
- Paul Bowles (1910–1999)
- Peter Boyer (born 1970)
- Martin Boykan (1931–2021)
- Henry Brant (1913–2008)
- Anthony Braxton (born 1945)
- Joseph Carl Breil (1870–1926)
- Kendall Durelle Briggs (born 1959)
- Roger Briggs (born 1952)
- George Frederick Bristow (1825–1898)
- Howard Brockway (1870–1951)
- Earle Brown (1926–2002)
- Uzee Brown Jr (born 1950)
- William Brown (active 1780–1790)
- Dave Brubeck (1920–2012)
- Adolf Brune (1870–1935)
- George Brunner (born 1951)
- Steven Bryant (born 1972)
- Mark Bucci (1924–2002)
- Dudley Buck (1839–1909)
- Harold Budd (1936–2020)
- Harry Burleigh (1866–1949)
- Carter Burwell (born 1954)
- Howard J. Buss (born 1951)

== C ==
- Curt Cacioppo (born 1951)
- Charles Wakefield Cadman (1881–1946)
- John Cage (1912–1992)
- David DeBoor Canfield (born 1950)
- John Carisi (1922–1992)
- Robert Carl (born 1954)
- David Carlson (born 1952)
- John Alden Carpenter (1876–1951)
- Richard Carpenter (born 1946)
- Benjamin Carr (1768–1831)
- Elliott Carter (1908–2012)
- Kristopher Carter (born 1972)
- Romeo Cascarino (1922–2002)
- Mario Castelnuovo-Tedesco (1895–1968)
- George Whitefield Chadwick (1854–1931)
- Evan Chambers (born 1963)
- Eric Chasalow (born 1955)
- George S. Chase (1909–1972)
- Rhys Chatham (born 1952)
- Chen Yi (born 1953)
- Paul Chihara (born 1938)
- Barney Childs (1926–2000)
- F. Melius Christiansen (1871–1955)
- Paul J. Christiansen (1914–1997)
- Avery Claflin (1898–1979)
- Philip Greeley Clapp (1888–1954)
- Rene Clausen (born 1953)
- Gloria Coates (1933–2023)
- Nellie Weldon Cocroft (1885–1986)
- Louis Coerne (1870–1922)
- Robert Cogan (1930–2021)
- James Cohn (1928–2021)
- Dan Coleman (born 1972)
- Valerie Coleman (born 1970)
- Edward Joseph Collins (1886–1951)
- Laura Sedgwick Collins (1859–1927)
- Edward T. Cone (1917–2004)
- Zez Confrey (1895–1971)
- Sylvia Constantinidis (born 1962)
- David Conte (born 1955)
- Bill Conti (born 1942)
- Charles Crozat Converse (1832–1918)
- Frederick Converse (1871–1940)
- Will Marion Cook (1869–1944)
- Carson Cooman (born 1982)
- David Cope (born 1941)
- Aaron Copland (1900–1990)
- Carmine Coppola (1910–1991)
- Sidney Corbett (born 1960)
- John Corigliano (born 1938)
- Mildred Couper (1887–1974)
- Henry Cowell (1897–1965)
- Sibylla Bailey Crane (1851–1902)
- John Craton (born 1953)
- Ruth Crawford Seeger (1901–1953)
- Noah Creshevsky (1945–2020)
- Paul Creston (1906–1985)
- David Crumb (born 1962)
- George Crumb (1929–2022)
- Conrad Cummings (born 1948)
- Alvin Curran (born 1938)
- Sebastian Currier (born 1959)
- Hoyt Curtin (1922–2000)

== D ==
- Walter Damrosch (1862–1950)
- Joseph Dangerfield (born 1977)
- Richard Danielpour (born 1956)
- Mabel Wheeler Daniels (1878–1971)
- James Dashow (born 1944)
- Michael Daugherty (born 1954)
- Mario Davidovsky (1934–2019)
- Don Davis (born 1957)
- Katherine K. Davis (1892–1980)
- William L. Dawson (1899–1990)
- Reginald De Koven (1859–1920)
- Edmond Dédé (1827–1903)
- David Del Tredici (1937–2023)
- Norman Dello Joio (1913–2008)
- Stuart Dempster (born 1936)
- David Diamond (1915–2005)
- Clarence Dickinson (1873–1969)
- Emma Lou Diemer (1927–2024)
- Herbert Dillea (1870–1909)
- Fannie Charles Dillon (1881–1947)
- Lawrence Dillon (born 1959)
- James Di Pasquale (born 1941)
- Rocco Di Pietro (born 1949)
- Charles Dodge (born 1942)
- Daniel Dorff (born 1956)
- Celius Dougherty (1902–1986)
- John Thomas Douglass (1847–1886)
- John W. Downey (1927–2004)
- Deborah Drattell (born 1956)
- Paul Dresher (born 1951)
- Jacob Druckman (1928–1996)
- William Duckworth (1943–2012)
- John Woods Duke (1899–1984)
- Vernon Duke (1903–1969)

== E ==
- Julius Eastman (1940–1990)
- Dennis Eberhard (1943–2005)
- Clara Edwards (1880–1974)
- Cecil Effinger (1914–1990)
- Henry Eichheim (1870–1942)
- Danny Elfman (born 1953)
- Bradley Ellingboe (born 1958)
- Duke Ellington (1899–1974)
- Jonathan Elliott (born 1962)
- Abraham Ellstein (1907–1963)
- Mark Engebretson (born 1964)
- Donald Erb (1927–2008)
- Robert Erickson (1917–1997)
- Pozzi Escot (born 1933)
- Alvin Etler (1913–1973)
- Ralph Evans (born 1953)
- Eric Ewazen (born 1954)

== F ==
- Blair Fairchild (1877–1933)
- Mohammed Fairouz (born 1985)
- Richard Faith (1926–2021)
- Harry Falkenau (1864–1907)
- Arthur Farwell (1872–1952)
- Morton Feldman (1926–1987)
- Frank Felice (born 1961)
- Jim Ferguson (born 1948)
- Richard Festinger (born 1948)
- Paul Fetler (1920–2018)
- Jerry Fielding (1922–1980)
- Henry Fillmore (1881–1956)
- Irving Fine (1914–1963)
- Vivian Fine (1913–2000)
- Ross Lee Finney (1906–1997)
- C. P. First (born 1960)
- Clare Fischer (1928–2012)
- Nicolas Flagello (1928–1994)
- Carlisle Floyd (1926–2021)
- William Foden (1860–1947)
- Arthur Foote (1853–1937)
- Dan Forrest, Jr. (born 1978)
- Lukas Foss (1922–2009)
- Stephen Foster (1826–1864)
- Frederick A. Fox (1931–2011)
- Gabriela Lena Frank (born 1972)
- Harry Lawrence Freeman (1869–1954)
- Eleanor Everest Freer (1864–1942)
- Alexander Frey (born 1972)
- William Henry Fry (1813–1864)
- Kenneth Fuchs (born 1956)

== G ==
- Nancy Galbraith (born 1951)
- Jack Gallagher (born 1947)
- Charles Henry Galloway (1871–1931)
- Michael Gandolfi (born 1956)
- Kyle Gann (born 1955)
- J. Ryan Garber (born 1973)
- Roopam Garg (born 1995)
- Daniel E. Gawthrop (born 1949)
- Erin Gee (born 1974)
- Steven Gerber (1948–2015)
- Abbie Gerrish-Jones (1863–1929)
- George Gershwin (1898–1937)
- Michael Giacchino (born 1967)
- Vittorio Giannini (1903–1966)
- Miriam Gideon (1906–1996)
- William W. Gilchrist (1846–1916)
- Dizzy Gillespie (1917–1993)
- Don Gillis (1912–1978)
- Patrick Gilmore (1829–1892)
- Janice Giteck (born 1946)
- Philip Glass (born 1937)
- Frederick Grant Gleason (1848–1903)
- Roger Goeb (1914–1997)
- Joel Goffin (born 1981)
- Rubin Goldmark (1872–1936)
- Jerry Goldsmith (1929–2004)
- Michael Gordon (born 1956)
- Peter Gordon (born 1951)
- Ricky Ian Gordon (born 1956)
- Louis Moreau Gottschalk (1829–1869)
- Morton Gould (1913–1996)
- Donald Grantham (born 1947)
- Charles Greenberg (born 1953)
- Jay Greenberg (born 1991)
- Robert Greenberg (born 1954)
- Mark Gresham (born 1956)
- Charles Tomlinson Griffes (1884–1920)
- Thomas Griselle (1891–1955)
- Ferde Grofé (1892–1972)
- Louis Gruenberg (1884–1964)
- Mark Gustavson (born 1959)
- Woody Guthrie (1912–1967)
- Yalil Guerra (born 1973)
- Elizabeth Gyring (1886–1970)

== H ==
- Henry Kimball Hadley (1871–1937)
- William Edwin Haesche (1867–1929)
- Richard Hageman (1881–1966)
- Philip Hagemann (born 1932)
- Daron Hagen (born 1961)
- Alexei Haieff (1914–1994)
- Adolphus Hailstork (born 1941)
- Juliana Hall (born 1958)
- Roger Lee Hall (born 1942)
- W. C. Handy (1873–1958)
- Howard Hanson (1896–1981)
- John Harbison (born 1938)
- Edward W. Hardy (born 1992)
- Don L. Harper
- Roy Harris (1898–1979)
- Victor Harris (1869–1943)
- Lou Harrison (1917–2003)
- Stephen Hartke (born 1952)
- Walter S. Hartley (1927–2016)
- Samuel Hazo (born 1966)
- Hubert Klyne Headley (1906–1996)
- Celeste de Longpré Heckscher (1860–1928)
- Neal Hefti (1922–2008)
- Jake Heggie (born 1961)
- Adel Heinrich (1926–2022)
- Anthony Philip Heinrich (1781–1861)
- Robert Helps (1928–2001)
- Swan Hennessy (1866–1929)
- Victor Herbert (1859–1924)
- Bern Herbolsheimer (1948–2016)
- Bernard Herrmann (1911–1975)
- Michael Hersch (born 1971)
- James Hewitt (1770–1827)
- Sean Hickey (born 1970)
- Ethel Glenn Hier (1889–1971)
- Jennifer Higdon (born 1962)
- Edward Burlingame Hill (1872–1960)
- Mari Ruef Hofer (1858/59–1929)
- Lee Hoiby (1926–2011)
- Oliver Holden (1765–1844)
- Lee Holdridge (born 1944)
- Sidney Homer (c. 1864 – 1953)
- Helen Francis Hood (1863–1949)
- James Horner (1953–2015)
- Alan Hovhaness (1911–2000)
- James Newton Howard (born 1951)
- Mary Howe (1882–1964)
- Huang Ruo (born 1976)
- Richard Hundley (1931–2018)
- Karel Husa (1921–2016)
- Sarah Hutchings (born 1984)
- Henry Holden Huss (1862–1953)
- Jason Kao Hwang (born 1957)

== I ==
- Anthony Iannaccone (born 1943)
- Chester Edward Ide (1877–1944)
- Andrew Imbrie (1921–2007)
- Kamran Ince (born 1960)
- Mark Isham (born 1951)
- Charles Ives (1874–1954)

== J ==
- Steve Jablonsky (born 1970)
- Frederick Jacobi (1891–1952)
- Carrie Jacobs-Bond (1862–1946)
- Stephen Jaffe (born 1954)
- Philip James (1890–1975)
- David C. Johnson (1940–2021)
- David N. Johnson (1922–1987)
- James P. Johnson (1894–1955)
- Tom Johnson (1939–2024)
- Ben Johnston (1926–2019)
- Edwin Arthur Jones (1853–1911)
- Quincy Jones (1933–2024)
- Ron Jones (born 1954)
- Samuel Jones (born 1935)
- Scott Joplin (1868–1917)
- Bradley Joseph (born 1965)

== K ==
- Camara Kambon (born 1973)
- Michael Kamen (1948–2003)
- Erin Kamler (born 1975)
- Božidar Kantušer (1921–1999)
- Leonard Kastle (1929–2011)
- Ulysses Kay (1917–1995)
- Edgar Stillman Kelley (1857–1944)
- Eddie Kendricks (1939–1992)
- Martin Kennedy (born 1978)
- Jerome Kern (1885–1945)
- Aaron Jay Kernis (born 1960)
- Earl Kim (1920–1998)
- Karl King (1891–1971)
- Leon Kirchner (1919–2009)
- John N. Klohr (1869–1956)
- Douglas Knehans (born 1957)
- Edward Knight (born 1961)
- Charles Knox (1929–2019)
- Karl Kohn (1926–2024)
- Ellis B. Kohs (1916–2000)
- Ben Kopec (born 1981)
- Clara Anna Korn (1866–1941)
- Erich Wolfgang Korngold (1897–1957)
- Thomas Kotcheff (born 1988)
- William Kraft (1923–2022)
- Ernst Krenek (1900–1991)
- Gail Kubik (1914–1984)
- Joseph Francis Kuhn (1924–1962)
- Jean Paul Kürsteiner (1864–1943)
- Kristin Kuster (born 1973)
- Robert Kyr (born 1952)

== L ==
- Frank La Forge (1879–1953)
- John La Montaine (1920–2013)
- Carl Lachmund (1853–1928)
- Ezra Laderman (1924–2015)
- Lori Laitman (born 1955)
- Joseph Lamb (1887–1960)
- Charles Lucien Lambert (1828–1896)
- Lucien Lambert, Jr. (1858–1945)
- Benjamin Johnson Lang (1837–1909)
- David Lang (born 1957)
- Margaret Ruthven Lang (1867–1972)
- Vanessa Lann (born 1968)
- Paul Lansky (born 1944)
- Carter Larsen
- Libby Larsen (born 1950)
- Nicholas Laucella (1882–1952)
- Morten Lauridsen (born 1943)
- Thomas Oboe Lee (born 1945)
- Benjamin Lees (1924–2010)
- David Leisner (born 1953)
- James Lentini (born 1958)
- Tania León (born 1943)
- Fred Lerdahl (born 1943)
- Jonathan Leshnoff (born 1973)
- John Lessard (1920–2003)
- Paul Alan Levi (born 1941)
- Marvin David Levy (1932–2015)
- Frank Lewin (1925–2008)
- John Lewis (1920–2001)
- Peter Scott Lewis (born 1953)
- Lowell Liebermann (born 1961)
- Peter Lieberson (1946–2011)
- Sally Liebling (1859–1909)
- Max Liebling (1845–1927)
- Emil Liebling (1851–1914)
- Abraham Lilienthal (1859–1912)
- Scott Lindroth (born 1958)
- Dan Locklair (born 1949)
- Normand Lockwood (1906–2002)
- Charles Martin Loeffler (1861–1935)
- Hannibal Lokumbe (born 1948)
- Zhou Long (born 1953)
- Harvey Worthington Loomis (1865–1930)
- Alvin Lucier (1931–2021)
- David Ludwig (born 1974)
- Otto Luening (1900–1996)
- Ralph Lyford (1882–1927)
- Frank Lynes (1858–1913)

== M ==
- Edward MacDowell (1860–1908)
- Tod Machover (born 1953)
- John Mackey (born 1973)
- Steven Mackey (born 1956)
- Janet Maguire (1927–2019)
- Martin Mailman (1932–2000)
- Ursula Mamlok (1923–2016)
- Mana-Zucca (1885–1981)
- Henry Mancini (1924–1994)
- Kathleen Lockhart Manning (1890–1951)
- Paul Manz (1919–2009)
- Matteo Marchisano-Adamo (born 1973)
- Arthur Marshall (1881–1947)
- Ingram Marshall (1942–2022)
- Donald Martino (1931–2005)
- Salvatore Martirano (1927–1995)
- David Maslanka (1943–2017)
- Daniel Gregory Mason (1873–1953)
- Lowell Mason (1792–1872)
- William Mason (1829–1908)
- Arthur Maud (born 1932)
- Richard Maxfield (1927–1969)
- William J. McCoy (1848–1926)
- John McGuire (born 1942)
- George Frederick McKay (1899–1970)
- Kirke Mechem (born 1925)
- Harold Meltzer (born 1966)
- Vince Mendoza (born 1961)
- Alan Menken (born 1949)
- Peter Mennin (1923–1983)
- Gian Carlo Menotti (1911–2007)
- Gregory Mertl (born 1969)
- Edgar Meyer (born 1960)
- Paul Miersch (1868–1956)
- Charles Mills (1914–1982)
- Charles Mingus (1922–1979)
- Eric Moe (born 1954)
- John Christopher Moller (1755–1803)
- Meredith Monk (born 1942)
- Thelonious Monk (1917–1982)
- Dorothy Rudd Moore (1940–2022)
- Douglas Moore (1893–1969)
- Mary Carr Moore (1873–1957)
- Undine Smith Moore (1904–1989)
- Robert Moran (born 1937)
- Paul Moravec (born 1957)
- Justin Morgan (1747–1798)
- Jerome Moross (1913–1983)
- Robert Morris (born 1943)
- Robert Muczynski (1929–2010)
- Nico Muhly (born 1981)
- Carli Muñoz (born 1948)
- John Musto (born 1954)

== N ==
- Charles Naginski (1909–1940)
- Armen Nalbandian (born 1978)
- Conlon Nancarrow (1912–1997)
- Sammy Nestico (1924–2021)
- Arthur Nevin (1871–1943)
- Ethelbert Nevin (1862–1901)
- Alfred Newman (1900–1970)
- David Newman (born 1954)
- Emil Newman (1911–1984)
- Lionel Newman (1916–1989)
- Randy Newman (born 1943)
- Thomas Newman (born 1955)
- Roger Nichols (born 1940)
- Ted Nichols (born 1928)
- Alex North (1910–1991)

== O ==
- Mark O'Connor (born 1961)
- Martin O'Donnell (born 1955)
- Pauline Oliveros (1932–2016)
- Chris Opperman (born 1978)
- Leo Ornstein (1893–2002)
- Willson Osborne (1906–1979)
- Frank J. Oteri (born 1964)
- Hall Overton (1920–1972)

== P ==
- John Knowles Paine (1839–1906)
- John Nelson Pattison (1839–1905)
- Carter Pann (born 1972)
- Horatio Parker (1863–1919)
- J. C. D. Parker (1828–1916)
- Susan McFarland Parkhurst (1836–1918)
- Harry Partch (1901–1974)
- Clarence L. Partee (1864–1915)
- Thomas Pasatieri (born 1945)
- Stephen Paulus (1947–2014)
- Russell Peck (1945–2009)
- Smith Newell Penfield (1837–1920)
- Rudy Pérez (born 1958)
- Scott Perkins (born 1980)
- George Perle (1915–2009)
- William P. Perry (born 1930)
- Vincent Persichetti (1915–1987)
- Tobias Picker (born 1954)
- Daniel Pinkham (1923–2006)
- Russell Pinkston (born 1949)
- Walter Piston (1894–1976)
- Mika Pohjola (born 1971)
- Basil Poledouris (1945–2006)
- Cole Porter (1891–1964)
- Quincy Porter (1897–1966)
- William H. Potstock (1872–1941)
- Key Poulan (born 1962)
- John Powell (1882–1963)
- Mel Powell (1923–1998)
- Silas G. Pratt (1846–1916)
- André Previn (1929–2019)
- Florence Price (1887–1953)
- Frank Proto (born 1941)
- Arthur Pryor (1870–1942)
- Hilary Purrington (born 1990)
- Kevin Puts (born 1972)

== R ==
- John Rahn (born 1944)
- Phillip Ramey (born 1939)
- Shulamit Ran (born 1949)
- Bernard Rands (born 1934)
- Eda Rapoport (1890–1968)
- Carmino Ravosa (1930–2015)
- Ray Reach (born 1948)
- Daniel Read (1757–1836)
- Gardner Read (1913–2005)
- Alfred Reed (1921–2005)
- Mona Lyn Reese (born 1951)
- Steve Reich (born 1936)
- Alexander Reinagle (1756–1809)
- Jay Reise (born 1950)
- Leon René (1902–1982)
- Joe Renzetti (born 1941)
- Roger Reynolds (born 1934)
- Wallingford Riegger (1885–1961)
- Terry Riley (born 1935)
- Julie Rivé-King (1854–1937)
- Curtis Roads (born 1951)
- Leroy Robertson (1896–1971)
- Avery Robinson (1878–1965)
- George Rochberg (1918–2005)
- Eugénie R. Rocherolle (born 1939)
- Richard Rodgers (1902–1979)
- Robert Xavier Rodriguez (born 1946)
- Bernard Rogers (1893–1968)
- James Hotchkiss Rogers (1857–1940)
- Caro Roma (1866–1937)
- Douglas Romayne (born 1974)
- James Romig (born 1971)
- Joseph Willard Roosevelt (1918–2008)
- Ned Rorem (1923–2022)
- David Rosenboom (born 1947)
- Arnold Rosner (1945–2013)
- Christopher Rouse (1949–2019)
- David Ruffin (1941–1991)
- Carl Ruggles (1876–1971)
- Jake Runestad (born 1986)
- Craig Russell (born 1951)
- George Russell (1923–2009)
- Frederic Rzewski (1938–2021)
- Ron Fein (born 1952)

== S ==
- Peter Sacco (1928–2000)
- Rosamonde Safier (1912–1992)
- Richard St. Clair (born 1946)
- Mary Elizabeth Turner Salter (1856–1938)
- Michael Salvatori (born 1954)
- Steven Sametz (born 1954)
- Greg Sandow (born 1943)
- Kike Santander (born 1960)
- Eddie Sauter (1914–1981)
- Anthony Louis Scarmolin (1890–1969)
- Michael Schelle (born 1950)
- Ernest Schelling (1876–1939)
- Edward Benjamin Scheve (1865–1924)
- Peter Schickele (1935–2024)
- David Schiff (born 1945)
- Henry Schoenefeld (1857–1936)
- Paul Schoenfield (1947–2024)
- Gunther Schuller (1925–2015)
- William Schuman (1910–1992)
- Joseph Schwantner (born 1943)
- Stephen Schwartz (born 1948)
- Laura Schwendinger (born 1962)
- James Scott (1885–1938)
- Raymond Scott (1908–1994)
- Stephen Scott (1944–2021)
- Neil Sedaka (born 1939)
- Charles Seeger (1886–1979)
- José Serebrier (born 1938)
- John Serry, Sr. (1915–2003)
- Roger Sessions (1896–1985)
- John Laurence Seymour (1893–1986)
- Ralph Shapey (1921–2002)
- Harold Shapero (1920–2013)
- Alex Shapiro (born 1962)
- Michael Jeffrey Shapiro (born 1951)
- Judith Shatin (born 1949)
- Allen Shearer (born 1943)
- Harry Rowe Shelley (1858–1947)
- Sinyan Shen (1949–2016)
- Bright Sheng (born 1955)
- Arthur Shepherd (1880–1958)
- Charles Shere (1935–2020)
- Gordon Sherwood (1929–2013)
- Alice Shields (born 1943)
- Seymour Shifrin (1926–1979)
- Clare Shore (born 1954)
- Gregory Short (1938–1999)
- Wayne Shorter (1933–2023)
- Marilyn Shrude (born 1946)
- Alan Shulman (1915–2002)
- Elie Siegmeister (1909–1991)
- Arlene Sierra (born 1970)
- Roberto Sierra (born 1953)
- Sheila Silver (born 1946)
- Louis Silvers (1889–1954)
- Alan Silvestri (born 1950)
- Charles Sanford Skilton (1868–1941)
- Matthew Sklar (born 1973)
- Haskell Small (1948–2024)
- Leo Smit (1921–1999)
- Hale Smith (1925–2009)
- Julia Smith (1911–1989)
- Robert W. Smith (1958–2023)
- Stuart Saunders Smith (born 1948)
- William O. Smith (1926–2020)
- Harvey Sollberger (born 1938)
- S. P. Somtow (born 1952)
- Stephen Sondheim (1930–2021)
- Jeremy Soule (born 1975)
- John Philip Sousa (1854–1932)
- Leo Sowerby (1895–1968)
- Lewis Spratlan (1940–2023)
- Patty Stair (1869–1926)
- Paul Stanley (c. 1847 – 1909)
- Robert Starer (1924–2001)
- Cassius Clement Stearns (1838–1910)
- Emma Roberto Steiner (1852–1929)
- Adam Stern (born 1955)
- Humphrey John Stewart (1856–1932)
- William Grant Still (1895–1978)
- Stella Stocker (1858–1925)
- Allen Strange (1943–2008)
- Robert Strassburg (1915–2003)
- George Templeton Strong (1856–1948)
- Z. Randall Stroope (born 1953)
- Steven Stucky (1949–2016)
- Morton Subotnick (born 1933)
- Robert Suderburg (1936–2013)
- Dana Suesse (1909–1987)
- Laura Sullivan
- Ed Summerlin (1928–2006)
- Conrad Susa (1935–2013)
- William Susman (born 1960)
- Tomas Svoboda (1939–2022)
- Elizabeth Swados (1951–2016)
- Alan Mauritz Swanson (born 1941)
- James Swearingen (born 1947)
- John R. Sweney (1837–1899)
- Richard Swift (1927–2003)

== T ==
- Louise Talma (1906–1996)
- David Tamkin (1906–1975)
- Jerod Tate (born 1968)
- Deems Taylor (1885–1966)
- Raynor Taylor (1747–1825)
- James Tenney (1934–2006)
- Eugene Thayer (1838–1889)
- Christopher Theofanidis (born 1967)
- Augusta Read Thomas (born 1964)
- Randall Thompson (1899–1984)
- Robert Scott Thompson (born 1959)
- Virgil Thomson (1896–1989)
- Francis Thorne (1922–2017)
- John Thow (1949–2007)
- Frank Ticheli (born 1958)
- Frederick C. Tillis (1930–2020)
- Michael Sidney Timpson (born 1970)
- Helen Tobias-Duesberg (1919–2010)
- Ernst Toch (1887–1964)
- Michael Torke (born 1961)
- Gonzalo de la Torre (born 1977)
- Joan Tower (born 1938)
- George Tsontakis (born 1951)
- David Tudor (1926–1996)

== U ==
- Ken Ueno (born 1970)
- Chinary Ung (born 1942)

== V ==
- Frank Van der Stucken (1858–1929)
- David Van Tieghem (born 1955)
- David Van Vactor (1906–1994)
- John Verrall (1908–2001)
- Tommy Vig (born 1938)
- Ezequiel Viñao (born 1960)
- John Vincent (1902–1977)
- Roger Craig Vogel (born 1947)
- Robert Voisey (born 1969)

== W ==
- Melinda Wagner (born 1957)
- George Walker (1922–2018)
- Stewart Wallace (born 1960)
- Joelle Wallach (born 1946)
- Robert Ward (1917–2013)
- Dale Warland (born 1932)
- Harry Warren (1893–1981)
- Elinor Remick Warren (1900–1991)
- Rodney Waschka II (born 1963)
- Wintter Watts (1884–1962)
- Franz Waxman (1906–1967)
- Ben Weber (1916–1979)
- Seth Weeks (1868–1953)
- Jaromír Weinberger (1896–1967)
- Hugo Weisgall (1912–1997)
- Dan Welcher (born 1948)
- Richard Wernick (born 1934)
- Mark Wessel (1894–1973)
- Peter Westergaard (1931–2019)
- Paul W. Whear (1925–2021)
- Scott Wheeler (born 1952)
- Eric Whitacre (born 1970)
- Clarence Cameron White (1880–1960)
- Alec Wilder (1907–1980)
- John Williams (born 1932)
- Michael Glenn Williams (born 1957)
- Otis Williams (born 1941)
- Paul Williams (born 1940)
- Richard Storrs Willis (1819–1900)
- Meredith Willson (1902–1984)
- Brian Wilson (1942–2025)
- Dana Wilson (born 1946)
- Richard Edward Wilson (born 1941)
- Jason Wright Wingate (born 1971)
- Erling Wold (born 1958)
- Stefan Wolpe (1902–1972)
- Donald Reid Womack (born 1966)
- Stevie Wonder (born 1950)
- Mary Knight Wood (1857–1944)
- Carl Valentin Wunderle (1866–1944)
- Charles Wuorinen (1938–2020)
- Ruth Shaw Wylie (1916–1989)
- Yehudi Wyner (born 1929)

== Y ==
- Richard Yardumian (1917–1985)
- Christopher Yavelow (born 1950)
- Maury Yeston (born 1945)
- La Monte Young (born 1935)

== Z ==
- Judith Lang Zaimont (born 1945)
- Frank Zappa (1940–1993)
- John Zorn (born 1953)
- Ellen Taaffe Zwilich (born 1939)

== See also ==
- Chronological list of American classical composers
- List of American Northwest composers
