= List of American Northwest composers =

The following is a list of composers who lived and composed classical music in the Northwest region of the United States and whose music has been performed in a traditional setting - a ballet, chamber ensemble, concert band, opera, orchestra, or solo.

== A B C ==
- Miguel del Águila
- William Bergsma
- Ernest Bloch
- William Bolcom
- Roger Briggs
- Timothy Brock
- David Crumb

== D E F G ==
- Stuart Dempster
- Janice Giteck

== H I J K ==
- Bern Herbolsheimer
- Wayne Horvitz
- Alan Hovhaness
- Samuel Jones
- Robert Kyr

== L M N O P Q ==
- Morten Lauridsen
- Dylan Mattingly
- Jovino Santos Neto
- Michael Nicolella

== R S T ==
- Carol Sams
- Masguda Shamsutdinova
- Gregory Short
- Allen Strange
- Tomas Svoboda
- Gloria Swisher
- Diane Thome
- Gerhard Trimpin

== U V W X Y Z ==
- John Verrall
