= Safier =

Safier is a surname. Notable people with the surname include:

- David Safier (born 1966), German writer and novelist
- Rosamonde Safier (1912–1992), American musician
