= Nancy Van de Vate =

American and Austrian composer (1930–2023)

- Van de Vate in the 1990s
- Born: Nancy Jean Hayes; December 30, 1930; Plainfield, New Jersey, U.S.
- Died: July 29, 2023 (aged 92); Vienna, Austria
- Other names: Helen Huntley; William Huntley
- Citizenship: United States; Austria
- Education: Eastman School of Music; University of Mississippi; Florida State University; Dartmouth College; University of New Hampshire
- Occupations: Composer; violist
- Organizations: Memphis State University; University of Hawaii; Hawaii Loa College; League of Women Composers; Vienna Modern Masters

Nancy Jean Van de Vate (née Hayes; December 30, 1930 – July 29, 2023) was an American-born Austrian composer, violist and pianist. She also used the pseudonyms Helen Huntley and William Huntley. She is known for operas such as All Quiet on the Western Front, and orchestral music such as Chernobyl and Journeys, including concertos like the Kraków Concerto for percussion and orchestra.

Van de Vate taught at several universities in the United States and led composers' organizations such as the Southeastern Composers League and the International League of Women Composers. In 1985, she moved to Vienna, where she taught and founded a CD company for new orchestral music together with her husband.

== Life and career ==
Nancy Jean Hayes was born in Plainfield, New Jersey, on December 30, 1930. Raised in Warren Township, New Jersey, she graduated from North Plainfield High School in 1948. She studied piano on a scholarship at Eastman School of Music and music theory at Wellesley College. She completed graduate degrees in music composition at the University of Mississippi and Florida State University, where she earned a Ph.D. She pursued further studies in electronic music at Dartmouth College and the University of New Hampshire. The first professional performance of her work was in 1958 the Adagio for orchestra.

Van de Vate taught at Memphis State University from 1964 to 1966. She also played viola in the Knoxville Symphony, founded a chapter of the National Organization for Women (NOW) in Tennessee, and directed the Southeastern Composers League. She taught at the University of Tennessee (1967), Knoxville College (1968–1969; 1971–1972) and Maryville College (1973–1974). She moved to Hawaii in 1975 where she first taught at the University of Hawaii, and from 1977 to 1980 at the Hawaii Loa College serving there also as Dean of Academic Affairs. She became influenced by Asian music; and moved to Indonesia in 1982 for three years.

In 1975, she founded the League of Women Composers and served as chairperson until 1982; it was renamed the International League of Women Composers in 1979, and was merged into the International Alliance for Women in Music in 1995.

She lived permanently in Vienna from 1985. In 1990 she founded a CD company together with her husband Clyde A. Smith, Vienna Modern Masters, dedicated to new music for orchestra; she directed it after her husband's death. She taught composition at the Institute for European Studies in Vienna (IES). In 2010, the IES named her Composer-in-Residence.

=== Personal life ===
In 1952, Van de Vate married Dwight Van de Vate Jr. The couple had three children. They later divorced. She later married Clyde A. Smyth, who died of cancer in 1999.

Van de Vate died on July 29, 2023, at age 92, at home in Vienna.

== Work ==
Van de Vate composed seven operas, many orchestral works including concertos for one or more instruments, and chamber music. Her music has been seen as influenced by Prokofiev, Shostakovich, Penderecki, Crumb and Varèse.

Several of her compositions won international awards, and were nominated for the Pulitzer Prize, the orchestral work Chernobyl also for the Koussevitsky International Recording Award. Her works have been performed internationally.

=== Recordings ===
Many of Van de Vate's works were recorded by her CD company Vienna Modern Masters (VMM). A CD of orchestral works was produced in 1990, named after Distant Worlds, and played by the Polish Radio Symphony Orchestra conducted by Szymon Kawalla Arnold Whittall reviewed the album for Gramophone; he summarized: "Her orchestral music undoubtedly makes its presence felt, especially by means of densely dissonant climaxes whose weight and seriousness are appropriate to works with such grandly evocative titles", adding that it "lacks that distinctiveness and magnetism".

Her Chernobyl and her Violin Concerto was recorded by the same performers on a 1988 CD of mainly works by Penderecki, titled after Threnody to the Victims of Hiroshima. Her Krakow Concerto became the title of a 1991 album by the same performers, including also her Katyn, Schoenberg's A Survivor from Warsaw, and Penderecki's Dies irae.

Her vocal composition Cocaine Lil was recorded by Dietburg Spohr and her ensemble belcanto, as the final track of a 1994 CD named after Hanns Eisler's Woodburry-Liederbüchlein.

=== Opera ===
- Hamlet (2009) opera in five acts, after Shakespeare, recorded 2011, premiered by the University of Mississippi's Opera Theatre Group April 18, 2015
- Where the Cross Is Made (2003) opera in three acts, Libretto based on the play by Eugene O'Neill Premiere: 2005
- Im Westen nichts Neues (2002) opera in three acts, libretto after the novel by Erich Maria Remarque, premiere: September 28, 2003, Theater Osnabrück, directed by Thomas Münstermann
- All Quiet on the Western Front (1998) anti-war opera in three acts, premiere 2003, New York City Opera
- Nemo: Jenseits von Vulkania (1995) opera in four acts, libretto: Allen Cortes and Van de Vate recorded by VMM
- Der Herrscher und das Mädchen (1995) children's opera, premiered in Vienna 1995
- The Death of the Hired Man (Der Tod des Tagelöhners), (1958; rev. 1998) chamber opera, libretto: after Robert Frost, premiered in German 1999

=== Orchestral ===
- Suite for String Orchestra after Mechthild from Magdeburg (2000)
- Adagio and Rondo for Violin and String Orchestra (1994)
- Viola Concerto (1990) 16'
- Kraków Concerto for percussion and orchestra (1988) 25', recorded in 1991
- Abschied von Chernobyl, recorded in 2011 by Vienna Radio Symphony Orchestra conducted by Gottfried Rabl
- Katyn (1989) recorded in 1991
- Chernobyl (1987) written in response to the Chernobyl disaster, 13', premiered in Vienna by the Tonkünstler Orchestra, recorded in 1988
- Distant Worlds (1985) 16' premiered in Krakow in 1987, recorded in 1990
- Piece for Cello and Orchestra (1985), recorded in 1990
- Violin Concerto No. 1 (1985) in three movements, 26' dedicated to the composer's husband, Clyde A. Smyth, first performed in Kraków on June 20, 1987, by Janusz Mirynsky and the Polish Radio Symphony Orchestra conducted by Szymon Kawalla, and recorded by them in 1988
- Journeys (1984) 16' recorded in 1990, and in 1991 by the Bournemouth Symphony Orchestra conducted by Carolann Martin
- Concert piece for cello and small orchestra (1979)
- Dark nebulae (1981) 11', performed in Vienna at the Musikverein conducted by Carlos Kalmar, and by the Honolulu Symphony conducted by Donald Johannos, recorded in 1990
- Piano Concerto (1968, rev. 1994)
- Variations for Chamber Orchestra (1958), premiered in Hattiesburg, Mississippi, on March 13, 1963 by Mississippi Southern College Forum Orchestra, conducted by Vincent de Frank
- Adagio (1957) 6', premiered in Tuscaloosa, Alabama, on April 18, 1958 by University of Alabama Forum Orchestra, conducted by Henry Sopkin
- A Peacock Southeast Flew (Concerto for Pipa & Orchestra) (1997)

=== Theatre music ===
- Cocaine Lil (1986) for 4–8 jazz singers with small percussion, recorded in 1994 by ensemble belcanto, conducted by Dietburg Spohr
- A Night in the Royal Ontario Museum (1983) text: Margaret Atwood

=== Music for strings ===
- String Quartet No. 2 (2005)
- Piano Trio (1983)
- String Trio (1974)
- Viola Sonata (1964)
- String Quartet No. 1 (1969)

=== Music for percussion ===
- Suite for Marimba (2000)
- Teufelstanz (1988) for six percussionists

=== Music for mixed ensembles ===
- Music for Viola, Percussion and Piano (1976)

=== Choral music ===
- Cantata for Women's Voices (1979) texts: James Joyce, Walt Whitman, Charles Baudelaire, anon.
- An American Essay (1972) for choir, piano and percussion, texts: Walt Whitman
- The Pond (1970) for choir a cappella, text: Annette von Droste-Hülshoff, premiered 1970
- Make a Joyful Noise (1963) for chorus and piano (or organ), written under pseudonym William Huntley
- Psalm 121 (1958)

=== Keyboard instruments ===
- Twelve Pieces for Piano "On One to Twelve Notes" (1986) recorded in 2006 by Catherine Nardiello
- Fantasy for Harpsichord (1982)
