= Betty Rose Wishart =

American composer and pianist

Betty Rose Wishart is an American composer and pianist. Born on September 22, 1947, in Lumberton, North Carolina, she earned music degrees from Queens College (Charlotte, North Carolina) and the University of North Carolina at Chapel Hill, then pursued further studies in New York City. Her major teachers were Roger Hannay, Richard Bunger Evans, Donald Waxman, Michael Zenge, and Wolfgang Rose.

Wishart taught piano, theory, and composition at Kohinoor Music Company from 1972 to 1973, and joined the staff of Argo Classical Records in 1973. She started composing in 1974, initially under the name B. R. Wishart to disguise her gender. She served as president of the Southeastern Composers' League in 2008.

Wishart has received awards from:

- American College of Musicians
- American Pen Women
- American Society of Composers, Authors, and Publishers (ASCAP)
- Broward County Music Teachers Association
- Composers Guild
- Delta Omicron
- Fayetteville/Cumberland County Arts Council
- Vox Novus

Her compositions include:

== Chamber ==
- Ch'ien (four violins, temple blocks)
- Dreams (clarinet and piano; 1983)
- Experience (string quintet; 1971)
- Memories of Things Unseen (violin, flute, clarinet, cello; 1973)
- Memories II (violin, flute, clarinet, cello; 1983)
- Oracles (flute and piano)

== Organ ==
- Meditations for Trinity (1976)
- Prelude (1975)
- Sounds (1972)

== Piano ==
- Apprehensions (1971)
- Illusion Suite(1968)
- Kohinoor Sonata (1971)
- Leukoplakia (1968)
- Night Visions Suite
- Reflections (1983)
- Remembrance
- Reverie (1983)
- Salute (1982)
- Sonata
- Sonata No. 2
- Toccata II
- Toccata III
- Variations on a Folk Melody

== Vocal ==
- Go Now in Peace (soprano and alto; 1982)
- Hymn for the Children (1979)
- Lullabies for Peace
- Melancholy (1968)
- Shanti
- Requiem for Dreams

== Discography ==
- Piano Sonorities – Ravello Records 2016
- Concertante No. 1 Journey into the Unknown –Navona Records 2017
