= Ashburnham, Massachusetts =

- Town
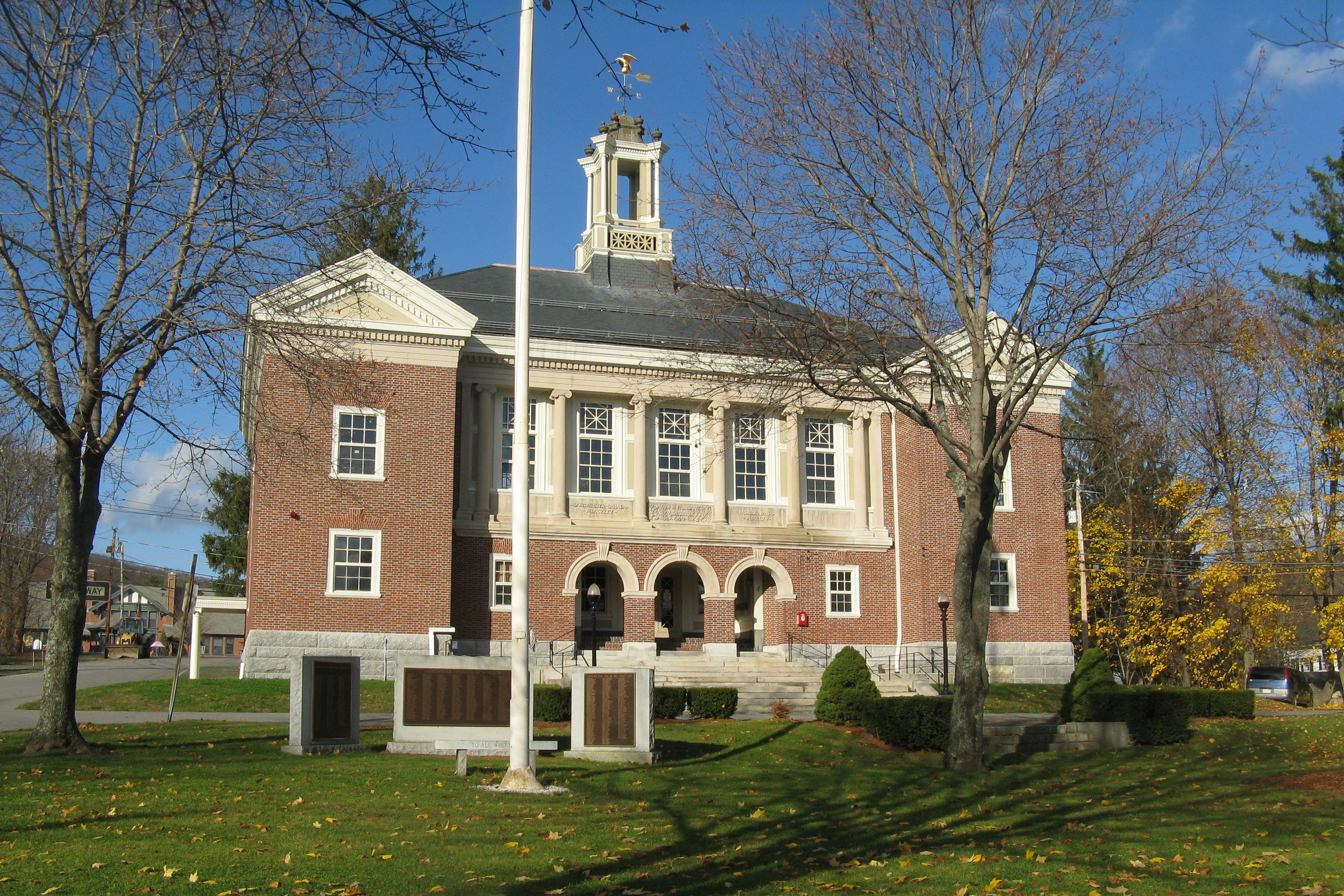
- Ashburnham Town Hall

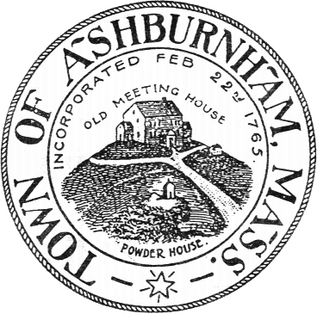
- Seal

- Location in Worcester County and the state of Massachusetts.
- Coordinates: 42°38′10″N 71°54′30″W
- Country: United States
- State: Massachusetts
- County: Worcester
- Settled: 1736
- Incorporated: 1765

Government
  - Type: Open town meeting
  - Town Administrator: Brian Doheny

Area
  - Total: 41.0 sq mi (106.2 km^{2})
  - Land: 38.7 sq mi (100.2 km^{2})
  - Water: 2.3 sq mi (6.0 km^{2})
- Elevation: 1,027 ft (313 m)

Population (2020)
  - Total: 6,315
  - Density: 163.2/sq mi (63.02/km^{2})
- Time zone: UTC−5 (Eastern)
  - Summer (DST): UTC−4 (Eastern)
- ZIP Codes: 01430 (Ashburnham); 01440 (Gardner)
- Area code: 351/978
- FIPS code: 25-01885
- GNIS feature ID: 0618356
- Website: www.ashburnham-ma.gov

Ashburnham (/ˈæʃbɜːrnˌhæm/) is a town in Worcester County, Massachusetts, United States. At the 2020 census, the town population was 6,315. It is home to Cushing Academy, a private preparatory boarding school.

Ashburnham contains the census-designated place of South Ashburnham.

== History ==
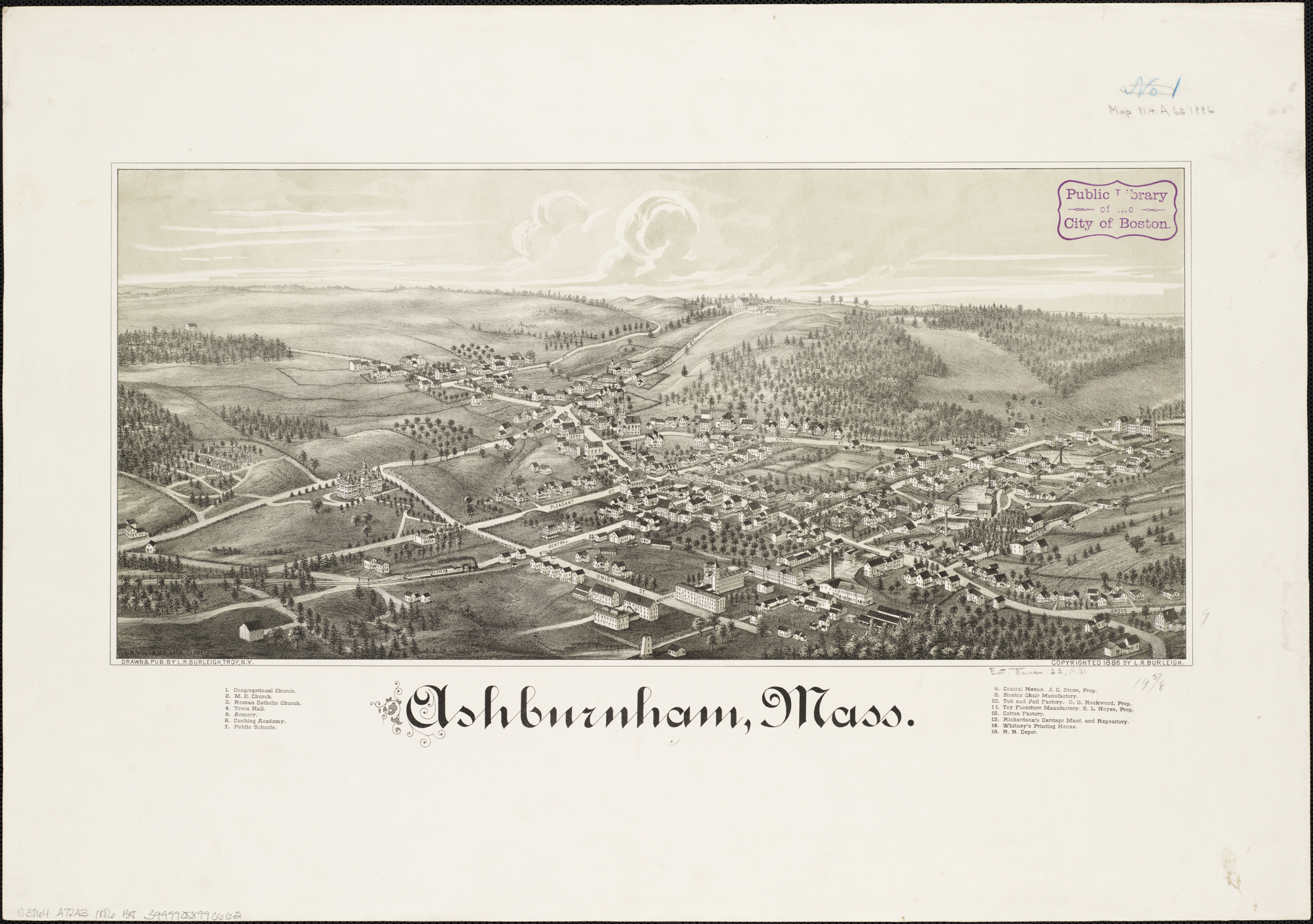
Print of Ashburnham from 1886 by L.R. Burleigh with list of landmarks

Ashburnham was first settled by Europeans in 1736, and was officially incorporated in 1765. The name is of British origin, possibly drawn from the Earl of Ashburnham, in Pembrey, or the Sussex community of Ashburnham.

Ashburnham was originally made up of the lands granted to officers and soldiers of a 1690 expedition to Canada. It was called the Plantation of Dorchester-Canada until it was incorporated.

== Geography ==
According to the United States Census Bureau, the town has a total area of 41.0 square miles (106 km^{2}), of which 38.7 square miles (100 km^{2}) is land and 2.3 square miles (6.0 km^{2}) (5.68%) is water.

Though it is over fifteen miles west of the easternmost portions of Worcester County, it nonetheless is the northeastern corner of the county.

=== Climate ===
Climate data for Ashburnham North, Massachusetts, 1991–2020 normals: 1146ft (349m)
Month	Jan	Feb	Mar	Apr	May	Jun	Jul	Aug	Sep	Oct	Nov	Dec	Year
Record high °F (°C)	65 (18)	72 (22)	78 (26)	89 (32)	92 (33)	93 (34)	95 (35)	92 (33)	91 (33)	81 (27)	73 (23)	64 (18)	95 (35)
Mean maximum °F (°C)	54.5 (12.5)	53.9 (12.2)	61.4 (16.3)	76.9 (24.9)	85.1 (29.5)	87.3 (30.7)	89.2 (31.8)	86.8 (30.4)	84.3 (29.1)	74.4 (23.6)	66.3 (19.1)	56.9 (13.8)	89.9 (32.2)
Mean daily maximum °F (°C)	31.0 (−0.6)	33.3 (0.7)	41.1 (5.1)	54.4 (12.4)	65.5 (18.6)	74.2 (23.4)	79.3 (26.3)	78.1 (25.6)	70.5 (21.4)	57.8 (14.3)	46.2 (7.9)	35.9 (2.2)	55.6 (13.1)
Daily mean °F (°C)	21.1 (−6.1)	22.9 (−5.1)	30.8 (−0.7)	43.3 (6.3)	54.5 (12.5)	63.6 (17.6)	68.7 (20.4)	67.3 (19.6)	59.9 (15.5)	47.6 (8.7)	37.6 (3.1)	27.2 (−2.7)	45.4 (7.4)
Mean daily minimum °F (°C)	11.3 (−11.5)	12.5 (−10.8)	20.5 (−6.4)	32.3 (0.2)	43.5 (6.4)	53.0 (11.7)	58.1 (14.5)	56.6 (13.7)	49.2 (9.6)	37.5 (3.1)	29.0 (−1.7)	18.5 (−7.5)	35.2 (1.8)
Mean minimum °F (°C)	−8.3 (−22.4)	−5.7 (−20.9)	1.1 (−17.2)	20.5 (−6.4)	29.7 (−1.3)	40.1 (4.5)	48.5 (9.2)	45.5 (7.5)	33.9 (1.1)	23.9 (−4.5)	14.3 (−9.8)	0.6 (−17.4)	−9.1 (−22.8)
Record low °F (°C)	−21 (−29)	−18 (−28)	−10 (−23)	10 (−12)	17 (−8)	33 (1)	45 (7)	43 (6)	29 (−2)	13 (−11)	−1 (−18)	−11 (−24)	−21 (−29)
Average precipitation inches (mm)	3.23 (82)	3.27 (83)	4.17 (106)	4.02 (102)	4.10 (104)	4.17 (106)	3.89 (99)	4.37 (111)	4.27 (108)	5.09 (129)	3.82 (97)	4.29 (109)	48.69 (1,236)
Average snowfall inches (cm)	13.3 (34)	19.9 (51)	9.8 (25)	2.1 (5.3)	trace	0.0 (0.0)	0.0 (0.0)	0.0 (0.0)	0.0 (0.0)	1.6 (4.1)	2.0 (5.1)	14.8 (38)	63.5 (162.5)
Source 1: NOAA
Source 2: XMACIS (2006–2020 snowfall, temp records & monthly max/mins)

== Demographics ==
Historical population
Year	Pop.	±%
1790	951	—
1850	1,875	+97.2%
1860	2,108	+12.4%
1870	2,172	+3.0%
1880	1,666	−23.3%
1890	2,074	+24.5%
1900	1,882	−9.3%
1910	2,107	+12.0%
1920	2,012	−4.5%
1930	2,079	+3.3%
1940	2,255	+8.5%
1950	2,603	+15.4%
1960	2,758	+6.0%
1970	3,484	+26.3%
1980	4,075	+17.0%
1990	5,433	+33.3%
2000	5,546	+2.1%
2010	6,081	+9.6%
2020	6,315	+3.8%
2025*	6,554	+3.8%
* = population estimate. Source: United States census records and Population Estimates Program data.

As of the census of 2000, there were 5,546 people, 1,929 households, and 1,541 families residing in the town. The population density was 143.4 inhabitants per square mile (55.4/km^{2}). There were 2,204 housing units at an average density of 57.0 per square mile (22.0/km^{2}). The racial makeup of the town was 97.66% White, 0.22% African American, 0.04% Native American, 0.61% Asian, 0.31% from other races, and 1.17% from two or more races. Hispanic or Latino of any race were 1.66% of the population. 19.5% were of Irish, 15.9% French, 13.7% French Canadian, 9.4% Italian, 7.0% English, 6.6% Finnish and 5.6% American ancestry according to Census 2000.

There were 1,929 households, out of which 42.0% had children under the age of 18 living with them, 66.8% were married couples living together, 9.3% had a female householder with no husband present, and 20.1% were non-families. 15.6% of all households were made up of individuals, and 5.4% had someone living alone who was 65 years of age or older. The average household size was 2.87 and the average family size was 3.20.

In the town, the age distribution of the population shows 29.0% under the age of 18, 6.7% from 18 to 24, 30.9% from 25 to 44, 24.5% from 45 to 64, and 8.9% who were 65 years of age or older. The median age was 37 years. For every 100 females there were 103.2 males. For every 100 females age 18 and over, there were 99.3 males.

According to the 2010 census, the median household income was $76,250 and the average household income was $81,324. The per capita household income was $29,044. About 4.8% of families and 6.4% of the population were below the poverty line, including 6.8% of those under age 18 and 6.4% of those age 65 or over. The median house cost was $266,347.

== Arts and culture ==
=== Points of interest ===
- Ashburnham is the starting point for the Wapack Trail and Massachusetts Midstate Trail.
- Cambridge Grant Historic District
- Mount Watatic was named as one of the 1,000 places to visit in Massachusetts by the Great Places in Massachusetts Commission.
- Frederick Historic Piano Collection
- Camp Winnekeag

== Government ==
County government: Worcester County
Clerk of Courts:	Dennis P. McManus
District Attorney:	Joseph D. Early, Jr. (D)
Register of Deeds:	Kathleen R. Daigneault (D)
Register of Probate:	Stephen Abraham (D)
County Sheriff:	Lew Evangelidis (R)
State government
State Representative:	Jonathan Zlotnik (D-2nd Worcester)
State Senator:	Jo Comerford (D-Hampshire, Franklin, & Worcester)
Governor's Councillor:	Tara Jacobs (D-Eighth Councillor District)
Federal government
U.S. Representative(s):	Lori Trahan (D-3rd District),
U.S. Senators:	Elizabeth Warren (D), Ed Markey (D)

The Town is governed by a Board of Selectmen who are elected to three-year terms. As of January 2020, the Board is served by Rosemarie Meissner (Chair), John Mulhall (member), Leo Janssens (member), and Mary Calandrella (Executive Assistant to Town Administrator).

The Ashburnham & Winchendon Joint Water Authority provides municipal water. The water source is the spring-fed Upper Naukeag Lake in Ashburnham.

== Education ==
Ashburnham is part of the Ashburnham-Westminster Regional High School district, along with neighboring Westminster. The town has one elementary school, the John R. Briggs Elementary School serving K–5. Middle school students attend Overlook Middle School, and high school students attend Oakmont Regional High School. There is one private school in the town: Cushing Academy.

== Infrastructure ==
=== Transportation ===
Highways include Route 12, Route 101, and Route 119.

An abandoned section of the Springfield Terminal Railroad passes through Ashburnham. A line of the Montachusett Regional Transit Authority (MART) serves Ashburnham, and also operates fixed-route bus services, shuttle services, as well as para-transit services for Ashburnham and the Montachusett Region.

There are two general aviation airports nearby, Fitchburg Municipal Airport and Gardner Municipal Airport, with the nearest national air service being at Manchester-Boston Regional Airport in New Hampshire and Worcester Regional Airport.

== Notable people ==
- Ivers Whitney Adams, founder and president of the Boston Red Stockings, Boston's first baseball team, as well as the Boston Base Ball Club, the first professional baseball franchise in Boston. He also gave to the town its own water supply as well as commissioned Bela Pratt to design the Schoolboy Statue of 1850, now on the corner of Main and School streets
- Melvin O. Adams, lawyer for Lizzie Borden, was born in Ashburnham
- Nate Berkus, designer and TV personality; graduated from Cushing Academy
- Bette Davis, legendary actress of film, television and theater. She lived in Ashburnham while attending Cushing Academy, graduating in 1927
- Isaac Hill (1788–1851), New Hampshire state representative, New Hampshire state senator, Comptroller of the United States Treasury in the Andrew Jackson administration, U.S. senator from New Hampshire, and governor of New Hampshire
- Harrison Carroll Hobart, Wisconsin politician
- William J. Lashua, World War II veteran known for his 90th birthday
- Amos Pollard, surgeon at The Battle of the Alamo
- Hans Rickheit, cartoonist, grew up in Ashburnham
- Cassius Clement Stearns (1838–1910), composer of church music
- Jigme Khesar Namgyal Wangchuck, King of the Kingdom of Bhutan; graduated from Cushing Academy
