= John Thow =

American composer

John Holland Thow (October 6, 1949 – March 4, 2007) was an American music composer. Thow produced an extensive and diverse body of work comprising solo, chamber, vocal, choral, operatic and orchestral repertoire.

Born in Los Angeles in 1949, Thow grew up in Ventura, California. As a child he studied flute and piano, and later studied composition with Adolph Weiss, a pupil of Schoenberg's, and conductor Frank Salazar. At University of Southern California he pursued his Bachelor of Music, studying composition with Ingolf Dahl. He continued his studies at Harvard with Earl Kim and Leon Kirchner, where he received his Ph.D. in composition in 1977.

Thow received a Fulbright Fellowship, which allowed him to travel to Rome for the first time in 1973 to study composition with Luciano Berio, who would become an important mentor and influence. Thow later returned to Italy as a recipient of the prestigious Rome Prize. During that time he also studied with Luigi Dallapiccola and Franco Donatoni.

After teaching at Boston University, Thow joined the University of California, Berkeley faculty in 1981, specializing in composition, orchestration, counterpoint, theory, in addition to teaching courses on American and European music of the 20th century. Some of his composition students include Keeril Makan, Dwight Banks, Richard Dudas, Yiorgos Vassilandonakis, Hubert Ho, and Dmitri Tymoczko.

A master of orchestration with a passion for literature and indigenous musical traditions, Thow produced a series of works featuring unusual instrumental combinations and vivid texts. His Chumash Songs for clarinet, violin, percussion and piano (2000), commissioned by the Ventura Chamber Music Festival, incorporated melodic and rhythmic elements of the Southern California Chumash Indian tribe. Musica d'amore is a trio for oboe d'amore, viola d'amore and harp; Summer Solstice (2005) sets contemporary Greek poetry. Three Echoes (2001) was written for the five-hole Lakota Sioux flute; Three Pieces for Carillon was performed at the International Carillon Festival at UC Berkeley's Campanile, and Six Duets for baroque flutes (2006) was premiered in London.

Thow received commissions from the San Francisco Symphony, Berkeley Opera, San Francisco Contemporary Music Players, Boston Musica Viva, Alea III, Earplay, Ventura Chamber Music Festival and Detroit Chamber Winds, among others. His compositions were performed at the Tanglewood and Edinburgh festivals, and by the L'Orchestra della RAI in Rome, Speculum Musicae and the Brooklyn Philharmonic. His lyrical and richly colored music has been consistently championed by the finest contemporary performers.

Thow's relationship with the San Francisco Symphony began with a 1986 performance of his Resonance. The Symphony subsequently commissioned the three-movement Into the Twilight from Thow in 1988, and Bellini Sky, a concerto for English horn inspired by the paintings of the 15th-century artist Giovanni Bellini, in 2005.

His late work for soprano and orchestra titled Eros and Dust (2003), based on texts by Matthew Arnold, Edwin Arlington Robinson, W. H. Auden and Rumi, was influenced by the September 11, 2001 attacks on Manhattan.

Thow received grants from the American Academy of Arts and Letters, the National Endowment for the Arts and the American Music Center, a Guggenheim Fellowship and the Rome Prize. He was artist-in-residence at the Yaddo, Djerassi, Temecula Arts, and Wurlitzer Foundations.
