= Peter Sacco =

American singer

- Born: Patrick Peter Sacco; October 23, 1928; Albion, New York, United States
- Died: August 12, 2000 (aged 71) Ashland, Oregon, United States
- Occupations: Composer, singer
- Instruments: Piano, organ, clarinet

Patrick Peter Sacco (October 23, 1928, Albion, New York – August 12, 2000, Ashland, Oregon) was an American composer and singer.

Sacco, under the tutelage of family members, was a traveling musician as a child, playing piano and performing as a soprano vocalist. He studied at Eastman Preparatory School during World War II, then received a bachelor's degree at SUNY-Fredonia in 1950. He then entered the military and studied while in Frankfurt under Wolfgang Niederste-Schee; he also performed on piano and organ and played clarinet as a member of the 4th Infantry Division band.

After completing his military service, he returned to Eastman, where he earned both master's and doctoral degrees, studying under Wayne Barlow, Howard Hanson, and Bernard Rogers. In 1959, he joined the faculty at San Francisco State University, remaining there until 1980; in 1970-71 he was visiting lecturer at the University of Hawaii.

Sacco performed as a tenor for many years and composed at least 200 works.
