= Helen Camille Stanley =

US Composer, pianist and violist

Helen Camille Stanley Hartmeyer Gatlin (6 April 1930 – 16 December 2021) was an American composer, pianist, and violist who began working with electronic and microtonal music in the 1960s. She composed under the name Helen Camille Stanley.

Stanley was born in Tampa, Florida, to Lucy Gage Crehore and Edward Stanley. She married John P. Hartmeyer in 1950. They had one daughter (Helen Marjorie), then divorced in early 1965. Later that year, Stanley married Richard Denby Gatlin.

Stanley earned a B. Mus. from Cincinnati Conservatory in 1951; a graduate fellowship and M. Mus from Florida State University in 1954; and a B.S. from Muskingum College (Ohio) in 1961. Her teachers included Hans Barth and Ernst von Dohnányi.

Stanley has worked as a violist with the El Paso Symphony and as music director at the El Paso Ballet Center. She has taught at Jones College and Jacksonville University. In 1986, she was the Florida Contemporary Ensemble’s composer-in-residence. Her awards include the C. Hugo Grimm Prize for Ensemble Composition; the Louis Pogner Chamber Music Award; the 1972 Florida State Music Teachers Association Award; and the Jacksonville Community Foundation Award. She belongs to the American Society of Composers, Authors, and Publishers (ASCAP); the American Composers Forum; and the Southeastern Composers League. Her works were recorded commercially on MMC 2024 in 1997 and MMC 2149 in 2006. She died on December 16, 2021, at the age of 91 in Jacksonville, Florida.

Stanley composed electronic music and also experimented with microtonal music. She used environmental recordings, including live bird songs, in her Rhapsody for Electronic Tape and Orchestra. Her compositions include:

== Ballet ==
- Birthday of the Infants

== Chamber ==
- Brass Quartet
- Fantasy and Fugue (brass)
- Overture for Timpani and Brass
- Piece (horn, percussion and piano)
- Sonata (trombone and piano; commissioned by William Cramer)
- String Quartet No. 1 1951
- String Quartet 1980
- Suite for Tuba
- Woodwind Quintet

== Electronic Tape ==
- Electronic Prelude
- Study

== Orchestra ==
- Concerto Romatico (viola and orchestra)
- Fanfare for Orchestra
- Night Piece (women’s chorus and orchestra)
- Passacaglia
- Rhapsody for Electronic Tape and Orchestra
- Symphony No. 1

== Piano ==
- Duo Sonata (tape and piano)
- Etudes
- Meditation (tape and piano)
- Modal Suite
- Sonatina

== Vocal ==
- “Tear Drops” (with Roy Calhoun, Edwin Charles, and Garry Goldner)
- “The Isle”
