= Southeastern Composers League =

United States musical organization

- Abbreviation: SCL
- Formation: 1950; 76 years ago
- Founder: Gurney Kennedy, Paul Newell
- Headquarters: United States
- Website: southeasterncomposersleague.org

The Southeastern Composers League (SCL) is an organization designed to support the composition and performance of contemporary art music by composers living in the southeastern portion of the United States. The major activity of the League is the sponsorship of an annual “Forum” in the southeastern United States where typically three to five different concerts are presented over a period of several days. Sometimes the Forum includes special guest composers from outside the region.

== History ==
The organization originated from the Alabama Composers' League, founded in 1950 by Gurney Kennedy and Paul Newell at the University of Alabama. The geographic area covered by the SCL includes Alabama, Arkansas, Delaware, District of Columbia, Florida, Georgia, Kentucky, Louisiana, Maryland, Mississippi, North Carolina, South Carolina, Tennessee, Virginia and West Virginia.

The organization remained headquartered at the University of Alabama until 1980, when a new structure and revised constitution was adopted. Guest composers who have been invited to the SCL Forum include Roy Harris, William Bergsma, Wayne Barlow, Ross Lee Finney, Peter Mennin, Helen Camille Stanley, Bernard Wagenaar, Norman Dello Joio, Lukas Foss, Vincent Persichetti, Robert Palmer, Burrill Phillips, Wallingford Riegger, Ernst Krenek, Henry Cowell, Milton Babbitt, Alvin Etler, Iain Hamilton, Robert Ward, Roque Cordero, Carlos Chavez and Harrison Birtwistle.

The fiftieth anniversary meeting was held at the University of Alabama. The sixtieth anniversary meeting, March 14–15, 2011, marked the first time the Forum has ever been held at North Carolina State University. Other recent instances of the event have been held at the University of Tennessee at Chattanooga, at Louisiana Tech, and the University of North Carolina-Greensboro.

== Officers and membership ==
The current officers of the organization are Ken Davies, President; Jonathan McNair, Vice President; Michael Young, Secretary; and Mark Frances, Treasurer. Other prominent members of the organization include Kenneth Jacobs, Roger Craig Vogel, past-president Gregory Carroll, past-president Donna Kelly Eastman, past-president Joe L. Alexander, past-president Betty Rose Wishart, Rodney Waschka II, Richard Montalto, and Bruce Mahin.
