= William J. Lashua =

American World War II veteran (1920–2013)

- Born: William Joseph Lashua; September 4, 1920; Ashburnham, Massachusetts, U.S.
- Died: May 23, 2013 (aged 92); Ashburnham, Massachusetts, U.S.
- Occupation: World War II veteran
- Spouse: Hilda May Spellman (died. 2005)

William Joseph Lashua (September 4, 1920 – May 23, 2013) was an American World War II veteran who served in the United States Army. He was best known for his 90th birthday, nicknamed "Operation: Birthday Boy," in which various internet users celebrated his birthday after a post was made on 4chan about a flyer asking people to join his birthday party.

== Early life ==
Lashua was born in Ashburnham, Massachusetts, the son of Walter and Sarah Lashua. He served in the United States Army during World War II.

== "Operation: Birthday Boy" ==
In 2010, Lashua's family reserved the Ashburnham American Legion Hall for Lashua's 90th birthday, because "he's such a great guy and everybody knows him," a quote from Linda Leham, a friend of Lashua. His family had set up a flyer advertising his birthday with the text "Wanted: People for Birthday Party" on a bulletin board of the Gardner Stop and Shop in his hometown. The flyer included a picture of Lashua, explaining how it was his 90th birthday on September 4 and would be held in the American Legion Hall.

The post was originally meant for the town locals, until an anonymous user on 4chan came across the flyer. The user posted his findings on 4chan asking other users on the site to "make this guy the happiest person ever for a day," nicknaming the event "Operation: Birthday Boy." It was unusual of 4chan to do this, being normally a malicious website. The post quickly became viral, receiving almost 4000 likes and over 500 comments, of which were mostly wishing him a happy birthday and for his military service and reaching other social media platforms such as Reddit, Tumblr and Facebook, with some users from those sites near Massachusetts driving to the location to attend his party. Lashua's grandson made a post on Reddit thanking everyone of this, but also kindly asked people who didn't know him personally to not attend. He also asked them not to send any strippers, gifts or food, but cards and wishes were greatly appreciated.

Leham says that she has received around 100 calls from many foreign countries such as Japan, Sweden and Switzerland also wishing him a happy birthday, though the people calling thought that Lashua was going to be by himself at his birthday because of the flyer asking people to join it.

== Personal life and death ==
Lashua was married to Hilda May Spellman. Their marriage lasted until her death in 2005.

Lashua died on May 23, 2013, at his home in Ashburnham, Massachusetts, at the age of 92.
