= Abraham Lilienthal =

American composer

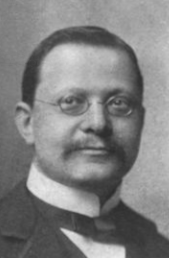
- Born: February 13, 1859; New York, New York
- Died: March 15, 1928 (aged 69); New York, New York
- Occupations: Violinist, composer
- Spouse: Ida C. Salberg (m. 1885)
- Children: 1

Abraham Wolf Lilienthal (February 13, 1859 – March 15, 1928) was an American violinist and composer.

== Biography ==
Abraham Lilienthal was born in New York City on February 13, 1859, the son of Solomon Lilienthal and Louisa Schwarzschild. He married Ida C. Salberg on May 15, 1885, and they had one daughter.

Lilienthal was a violinist in the orchestras of Leopold Damrosch and Theodore Thomas and with the New York String Quartet. He was heavily involved with the Bohemian music club in New York, including leadership roles through most of the 1910s. Much of his compositional output was chamber music, but he collaborated on an opera, The Dove of Peace, with Walter Damrosch and Wallace Irving.

Adolph Weiss and Maurice Baron were among his students of composition in New York. He died in New York City on March 15, 1928.

== Selected Compositions ==
- Mazeppa Galop, op. 5 for orchestra
- String Quartet in B-flat, op. 17, 1916
- Trio for Violin, Viola, and Cello in B-flat, Op. 25
- Cello Sonata, op. 40
- The Dove of Peace, opera, written with Walter Damrosch and Wallace Irving
- Sonata for violin and piano, 1914
- arrangement of Goldmark's Call of the Plains and Witches' Sabbath
