= William Edwin Haesche =

American composer

William Edwin Haesche (April 11, 1867 – January 26, 1929) was an American composer.

Haesche was born in New Haven, Connecticut, to Henry W. Haesche, a German immigrant, and his wife, the former Rosian Gaffney, an Irish immigrant.

He studied violin with Bernard Listemann and piano with Ernst Perabo. He was mainly self-taught in music theory, except for a course in fugue and general composition with Horatio Parker at Yale University where he was awarded the degree of Bachelor of Music. He co-founded the New Haven Symphony Orchestra where he played first violin. He conducted the People's Choral Union, a choir of 250 voices. In 1903 he became instructor of instrumentation at Yale.

In the 1894 New Haven city directory, he is listed as being a violin teacher.

He wrote a number of works for orchestra, as well as some chamber music and songs; he also composed some pieces for choir. Haesche composed the piece "Marguerite Waltz" for viola and piano.

His works include:

- 1896: Forest Idylle, tone poem for orchestra
- 1897: Fridtjof Saga, overture (won a prize)
- 1898: Young Lovel's Bride, ballad for female choir and orchestra
- 1899: Springtime, overture
- 1901: Symphony in A-flat
- 1903: The Haunted Oak of Nannau, dramatic cantata for chorus and orchestra
- 1904: Fridtjof, symphonic poem
- 1904: Ingeborg, symphonic poem
- 1913: The South, symphonic poem
- 1913: Symphonietta
- Sonata for piano and violin in E major
- Legend for violin, cello and piano
- Anthems, songs

At the time of his death he was employed by Hollins College where he was teaching music theory. As stated on his death certificate, Haesche died in Roanoke, Virginia, of carcinoma of the rectum after two operations.
