= Ron Fein =

- Born: December 27, 1952 (age 73)
- Origin: America
- Genres: Modern classical music
- Occupation: Composer
- Spinoffs: Kronos Quartet, Gregg Smith Singers
- Website: ronfein.net

Ron Fein (born December 27, 1952) is an American composer in modern classical music. He has published 15 albums and made other commissions and performances.

== Life and career ==
He earned his BA in Music Composition from Dominican University, with graduate work at California Institute of the Arts, where he studied with Earle Brown and Morton Subotnick. He later pursued an MA at Goddard College.

He has published over 15 albums and received commissions from the San Francisco Opera Center, with premieres from Li-Chan Chen for Pantoums (1985) and from Jacob Will for Songs for Eve (1985). His works have been performed by renowned ensembles such as the Kronos Quartet and Gregg Smith Singers. His albums concentrate on his noncooperative ensemble, a type of poly-temporal music breaking with the constraints of tempo, meter, verticality, and tonality.

== Discography ==
List of Albums by Ron Fein
Serial number	Album name	Year of release
1	Beyond	2023
2	Stile Brillante Post Chopin	2022
3	Ocean Ragas	2022
4	Double Jazz	2022
5	String	2022
6	Equatorial	2020
7	Anima	2019
8	Push Pull	2018
9	Natura	2017
10	Music of the Ancient, Lost or Forgotten	2015
11	Stasis: Electronic Poems	2015
12	Sings Jack London: Thunder in His Hand	2014
13	Piano Forte Piano	2013
14	Vesuvio Jazz Trio	2011
15	Drumming the Moon	2009
16	Music for Noncooperative Ensembles	1986

== Accolades ==
He has received several awards for his contributions to music, including the ASCAP Standard Award and grants from organizations such as Artist Trust, YADDO, Virginia Center for the Creative Arts, Villa Montalvo, Helene Wurlitzer Foundation, Banff Center for the Arts, Dorland Mountain Colony, and the Meet The Composer Award.
