= Helen Francis Hood =

Pianist and composer

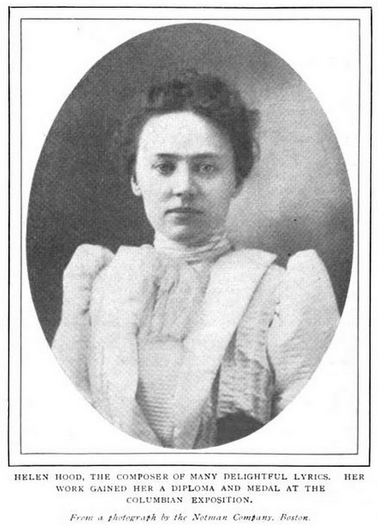
Helen Francis Hood, from a 1908 publication.

Helen Francis Hood (28 June 1863 – 22 January 1949) was an American pianist, composer and teacher. She was born in Chelsea, Massachusetts, and studied music in Boston with Benjamin Johnson Lang, J.C.D. Parker, John Knowles Paine, and George Chadwick. She continued her studies in Berlin with Moritz Moszkowski and Philipp Scharwenka. She was awarded a diploma and medal for her achievements at the World's Columbian Exposition, Chicago, Illinois. She died in Brookline, Massachusetts.

== Works ==
Hood may have composed the first American trio for piano, violin and cello. Selected works include:

- Disappointment
- The Violet
- Cornish Lullaby
- Robin
- Shepherdess
- Message of the Rose
