= Roger Craig Vogel =

American composer (born 1947)

Roger C. Vogel
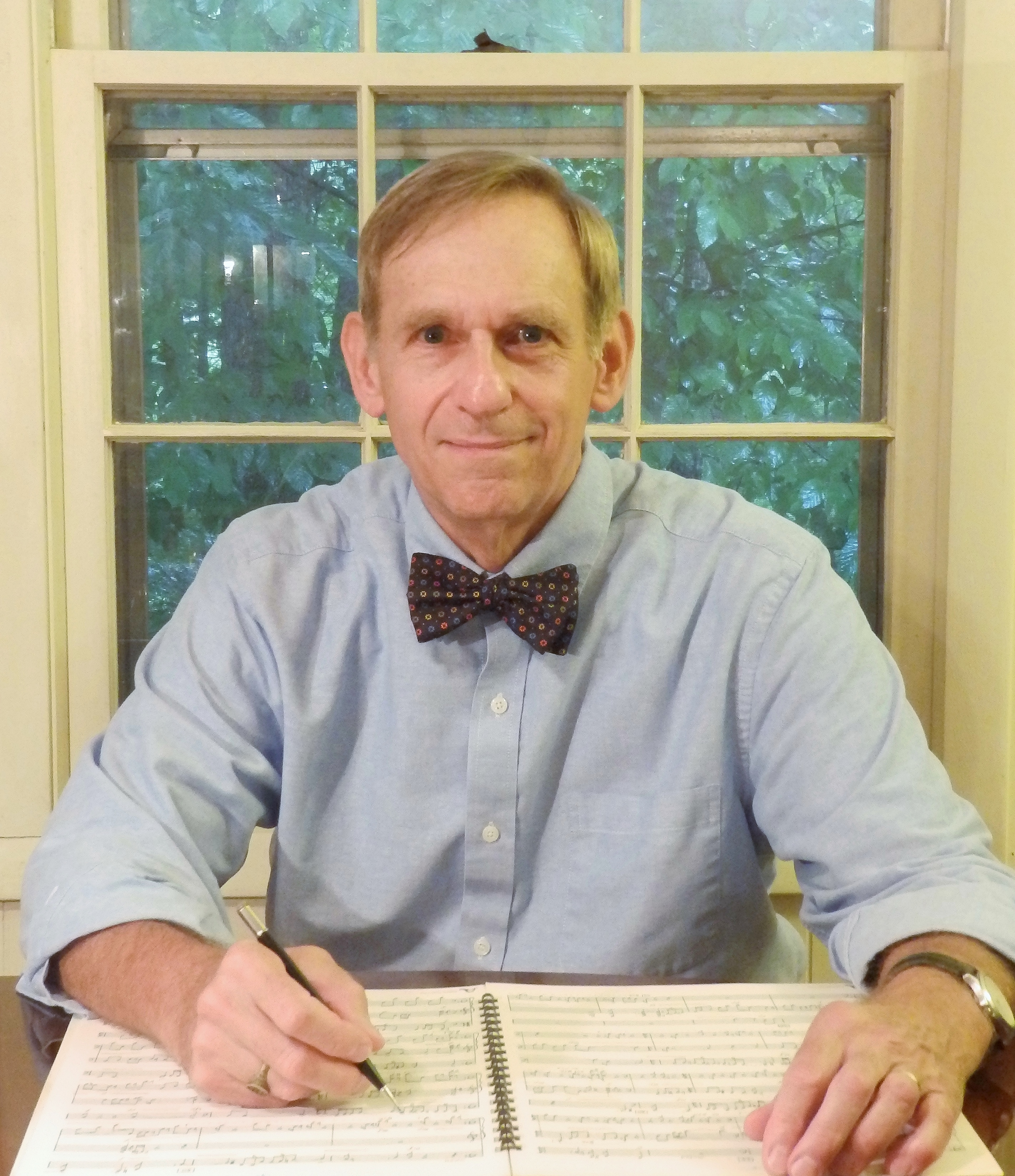
- Born: July 6, 1947 (age 79)
- Era: Contemporary

Roger Craig Vogel (born July 6, 1947) is an American composer of contemporary classical music and a music educator.

== Life ==
The oldest of two children, Vogel was born in Cleveland, Ohio and graduated in 1965 from Lincoln High School in Cleveland Ohio. He studied music theory and composition at the Ohio State University in Columbus (Ohio) and earned the degrees of Bachelor of Music in composition in 1971, Master of Music in music theory in 1973, and in 1975 he was awarded a Doctor of Philosophy in music theory. His teachers included Marshall Barnes, Jay Huff, Norman Phelps, and Wolf Rosenberg. Although his graduate major was music theory, he was awarded first prize in the Delta Omicron Composition Contest in 1973 and 1974. Also, his original composition Obstreperous Sonority Number 2a for string orchestra won the student concerto competition in 1973, and the following year his work Encounter Number One for large orchestral also won the competition.

In 1976, he joined the faculty of the University of Georgia in Athens, Georgia as an assistant professor and taught both music theory and composition. He became associate professor in 1982, and full professor in 1996. He has been professor emeritus since 2012.

As a composer he has written and published more than 120 works for a variety of ensembles with such firms as the American Composers Alliance, Brixton Publications, Wiltshire Music Company, Hal Leonard Corporation, Jon Ross Music, LLC, and seven other publishers. His music has received favorable reviews in the Journal of Singing, Fanfare (magazine), American Choral Directors Association The Choral Journal, NACWPI JOURNAL, The Saxophone Symposium, and numerous other publications. In addition, he has been an active member of the Southeastern Composers League.

== Awards ==
Vogel's awards include prizes from the Roger Wagner Choral Composition Competition, the National Saxophone Workshop Composition Contest, the National Flute Association, and the Delius Composition Competition. In 2011 he received the University of Georgia Albert Christ Janer Award. He has received commissions from the Georgia Music Teachers Association, the University of Georgia, Sigma Alpha Iota Professional Women's Music Fraternity, Phi Mu Alpha Professional Men's Music Fraternity, the Helios Duo, he Fellowship of Reason, the Athens Master Chorale, the Medical College of Georgia, the Georgia 'Cello Society, the Chattanooga Clarinet Choir and the Bass Club of Georgia. His works have been performed in recitals, and at conventions and festivals, throughout the United States, South America, Europe, and in Asia. Noted American composer Samuel Adler has said of Vogel, "Vogel is a fine composer. His music is very solid . . . and the work of someone who feels deeply every note. I consider his works a fine contribution to the body of American music, and with it he has established himself as a composer with a good reputation throughout this country."

== Compositions ==
=== Orchestral music ===
- 1973-74 Three Sonorities, for string orchestra
- 1974 Encounter, for large orchestra
- 1980 Concerto, for horn and string orchestra
- 2021 Concertino for Alto Trombone and String Orchestra
- 2023 Reflections for two solo violins and string orchestra.

=== Music for band ===
- 1982 Allusions to Hollywood, for high school band
- 1991 Concerto, for alto saxophone and winds
- 1993 Ceremonial March, for band
- 1997 Fanfares and Flourishes, for three antiphonal brass quintets
- 2000 Flat Rock March, for middle school band
- 2001 Autumn Song, for middle school band
- 2004 Edenwood, for high school band
- 2005 Concerto, for trumpet and band
- 2010 Music Becomes Me for solo voice, solo flute, and wind ensemble
- 2013 Jammin' Junkyard Dawgs for Jazz Studio Orchestra
- 2023 Proclamations for symphonic band

=== Dramatic works ===
- 2009 Lysistrata, a chamber opera in one act after Aristophanes.
- 2011 Things Fall Apart, based on the novel by Chinua Achebe, for bass voice, flute, piano, and hand drums

=== Choral music ===
- 1986 Karma, for mixed chorus
- 1986 My Secret Love, for women's chorus (SSA)
- 1986 Psalm 100, for mixed chorus
- 1986 The Nature of the Cat, for women's chorus (SSA) and piano
- 1992-96 Cats and Bats and Things With Wings, for mixed chorus and piano
  1. The Cat
  2. The Frog
  3. The Owl (SSAA)
  4. The Crab (TTBB)
  5. The Grasshopper
  6. The Bat
- 1993 We Are the Music Makers, for women's chorus (SSAA), two flutes, and piano.
- 1999 Canticle of Reason, for mixed chorus
- 2003 Winter Song, for mixed chorus, two flutes, and piano
- 2016 Christmas Long Ago for mixed chorus and piano
- 2023 The Day Before Christmas for mixed chorus, alto recorder, and guitar

=== Vocal music ===
- 1986 It is Best Not to Be Born, for baritone, and piano
- 1986 When She Went Alone, for soprano, and piano
- 1989 One Flesh, for medium voice, soprano saxophone, and piano
- 1991 In Darkness, for high voice, alto saxophone, and piano
- 1993 The Devil's Songbook, for medium voice, bassoon (or cello, or double bass), and piano
  1. Of Politicians
  2. Of Attorneys
  3. Of Businessmen
  4. Of the Media
  5. Of Critics and Music
  6. Of Virtue
  7. Of Vanity
  8. Of Celebration
- 1998 Eine Kleine Snailmusik, for high voice, trumpet, cello, and piano
- 2000 The Frog, He Fly ... Almost, for high voice and trumpet (or clarinet, or flute)
- 2002 Burma Shave Songs, for men's chorus, alto saxophone and piano
  1. Grandpa's Beard
  2. No Lady Likes to Dance
  3. The Bearded Devil (TTBB en piano)
  4. The Wolf and Riding Hood
  5. The Midnight Ride
  6. Within This Vale (TTBB a capella )
  7. Bargain Hunters Gather 'Round
- 2002 The Distances They Keep, for two high voices, flute, and piano
- 2006 Love Letters, for high voice, violin and piano
  1. Your Letter Moved Me
  2. I Lie Awake
  3. Dear Miss West 47th Street
  4. My Dearest Nell (voice and piano)
  5. The French Ladies
  6. My Darling, Dear, Delightful Ringo
  7. Have You Heard That I Love You (voice and violin)
  8. Alas! I Have Suffered Your Scorn
  9. Everything Measurable Passes
  10. Interlude (violin and piano)
  11. Adieu, I Seal My Letter
- 2015 Take Time for medium voice and marimba.
  1. Take Time.
  2. Open Your Heart.
  3. Toot Not Your Horn Too Much.
  4. Cancelled Because of Snow.
  5. Flowers.
- 2015 Fragments of Your Ancient Name for medium voice and flute.
  1. Morning Star.
  2. Krishna.
  3. Door.
  4. Ocean of Joy.
  5. Lord of the Dance
- 2016 Christmas Long Ago for voice and flute choir
- 2019 thoughts from a cat for voice, flute, and oboe (or chromatic harmonica or clarinet, or soprano sax )
- 2021 My Ukulele for voice, ukulele, and flute, (or oboe, or chromatic harmonica)

=== Chamber music ===
- 1977 Divertimento, for saxophone ensemble (ssaaaattbbb)
- 1977 Suite in G, for oboe and bassoon
- 1978 Temporal Landscape Number 1, for tuba and piano
- 1979 Divertimento, for wind quintet
- 1979 Temporal Landscape Number 2, for flute, percussion, and piano
- 1980 Temporal Landscape Number 4, for tuba and piano
- 1981 Quartet, for Saxophones (SATB of AATB)
- 1981 Satanic Dance, for wind quintet
- 1981 Temporal Landscape Number 5, for alto saxophone and piano
- 1986 Sonata, for viola and piano
- 1986 Trio, for violin, cello and piano
- 1987 Metamorphoses, for trombone and piano
- 1987 Temporal Landscape Number 6, for trumpet and percussion
- 1993 Fantasy, for cello orchestra
- 1993 Sometimes Lyric Suite, for bassoon and piano
- 1993 Sonata, for alto saxophone and piano
- 1995 Duo Concertante, for double bass and piano
- 1995 Exultations, for flute quartet
- 1995 Night Winds, for wind quintet and alto saxophone
- 1995 Sirens, for flute duet (C and alto, or two C)
- 1996 Oboe, for medium voice and oboe
- 1996 Winter Sun, for flute and guitar
- 1997 Twin Moons, for flute and clarinet
- 1997 Voyages, for trumpet and percussionist
- 1998 Cornucopia, for multiple horns
- 2000 Mythic Quest, for flute and soprano saxophone (or clarinet)
- 2001 Twilight Reflections, for flute and guitar
- 2004 Eulogy, Aria, and Incantation, for contrabass and piano
- 2004 Illuminations in Brass, for solo trumpet and trumpet sextet
- 2005 Declarations, for double bass quartet (or euphonium-tuba quartet)
- 2005 Excursions, for flute and piano
- 2005 First Light, or oboe and piano
- 2005 Night Songs, for violin (or flute) and piano
- 2007 Odyssey, for viola and piano
- 2009 Cascades for brass quintet.
- 2010 Canticles for clarinet, cello, and piano
- 2011 Pas de deux for flute and trombone (or flute and bassoon)
- 2011 Solar Lights for trombone and bass trombone
- 2012 Two to Tango for clarinet and horn
- 2012 Five Sketches for violin and viola
- 2013 Bonbons for three flutes
- 2013 Stepping Out for tenor and bass trombone
- 2013 On The Wing for violin, alto saxophone, and piano
- 2013 Night Moves for trumpet and piano
- 2014 Cityscapes for clarinet choir
- 2017 Roman Festivals for flute choir
- 2017 Night Moves for trumpet and piano.
- 2018 Journeys for flute and string quartet
- 2018 Six Dialogues for flute and horn
- 2018 Festivities for flute, horn in F, and piano
- 2018 On the Wing for violin, alto saxophone, and piano
- 2019 Recollections for violin and percussion
- 2019 Masquerade for oboe, clarinet in Bb, and piano
- 2022 Flute Festivities for flute choir
- 2022 Outward Bound for trumpet and piano
- 2023 Meditation for flute choir

=== Works for keyboard ===
- 1986 Ecologue for piano
- 1986 Sonata for piano
- 1986 Fantasy for harpsichord
- 1988 Suite for piano
- 1990 Sonata Number Two for piano
- 2006 Moment for piano
- 2011 Five Preludes for piano
- 2018 Five Intermezzi for piano
- 2020 Nine Bagatelles for Piano.

=== Music for percussion ===
- 1980 Temporal Landscape Number 3, for percussion ensemble (six players)

=== Music for solo instruments ===
- 1977 Partita for Saxophone
- 1977 Partita for Flute
- 1978 Partita for Horn
- 1978 Partita for Clarinet
- 1993 Fantasy for Solo Violin
- 1996 The Guitarist's Day for guitar
- 1999 Oracle for alto flute
- 2009 Soliloquy for soprano saxophone (or sopranino saxophone)
- 2011 Six Cameos for bassoon
- 2013 Outings for bass trombone
- 2013 Moment for cello
- 2015 Taking Flight for vibraphone.

== Discography ==
- Cats and Bats and Things With Wings, a Centaur Records compact disc (CRC2488) contains:

- Fanfares and Flourishes
- Sonata Number Two for Piano
- Fantasy for solo violin
- Twin Moons for flute and clarinet
- One Flesh
- The Frog, He Fly. . . Almost
- Cats and Bats and Things With Wings

- Love Letters, an Oasis compact disk (ORCV4000) available from CDBaby contains:

- Love Letters
- The Distances They Keep
- In Darkness

- Things Fall Apart, an Albany Records compact disc (TROY 1409) contains: Things Fall Apart
- "Of Celebration" from The Devil's Songbook, appears on the ACA compact disc "Songs With a Touch of Bass" (CM20030).
- Voyages appears on the ACA compact disc "Music for Trumpet and Percussion" (CM20042).
- Temporal Landscape Number Six appears on the ACA compact disc "Music for Trumpet and Percussion" (CM20042).
- Kine Kleine Snailmusik appears on the Musicians Showcase compact disk "Trumpet in the Winds" (MS 1020).
- The Frog, He Fly. . . Almost appears on the Musicians Showcase compact disk "Trumpet in the Winds" (MS 1020)
- Fantasy for solo violin appears on the ART Classics compact disk "From Bach to Schnittke" (ART059)
- Winter Winds appears on an ACA compact disc entitled "Sunlight and Shadows" (CM20085)
- Concerto for Trumpet and Winds appears on a Summit Education Compact Disk entitled American Influences (DCD 454)
- Soliloquy for solo soprano saxophone appears on a Centaur compact disk entitled High Notes: New Music for the Sopranino Saxophone (CRC 3142)
- Pas de Deux for flute and trombone appears on Out of Bounds, an Aliud Records CD. (ACD BR 078–2).
- One Flesh for voice, soprano saxophone, and piano appears on The Chanting Saxophone, a HOVE CD. (SHL001).
- The Devil’s Songbook appears on the Albany compact disc Rendezvous in the Salon (TROY 1956)

== Music Theory ==
- "The Musical Wheel of Domingo Marcos Durán," College Music Symposium, Vol. XXII, No. 2 (Fall, 1982), pp. 51–66.
- Harmonic Progression in Milhaud: A Model for Instruction," Music Theory Explorations and Applications, Vol. 5 (Fall, 1996), pp. 32–43.
- The Musical Writings of Domingo Marcos Durán (c. 1465–1529) in English, Translated by Roger C. Vogel.

== Bibliography ==
- Henk Lambooij and Michael Feves. A Cellist's Companion: A Comprehensive Catalogue of Cello Literature. Netherlands: Stichting The Cellist's Companion, 2007.
- Winston Morris and Daniel Perantoni: Guide to the Tuba Repertoire: The New Tuba Source Book. Bloomington: Indiana University Press, 2006.
- Barbera Secrist-Schmedes. Wind Chamber Music: for Two to Sixteen Winds : An Annotated Guide. Lanham, MD: Scarecrow Press, 2002.
- Wolfgang Suppan, Armin Suppan: Das Neue Lexikon des Blasmusikwesens, 4. Auflage, Freiburg-Tiengen, Blasmusikverlag Schulz GmbH, 1994.
- Secular Choral Music in Print: Master Index. Philadelphia: Musicdata, Inc., 1993.
- Frances Bedford. Harpsichord and Clavichord Music of the Twentieth Century. Berkeley: Fallen Leaf Press, 1993.
- Thomas Siwe. Percussion Ensemble & Solo Literature. Champaign, IL: Media Press, 1993.
- Victor Rangel-Ribeiro and Robert Markel. Chamber Music: An International Guide to Works and Their Instrumentation. New York: Facts on File, 1993.
- Paul E. Bierley, William H. Rehrig: The Heritage Encyclopedia of Band Music : Composers and Their Music, Westerville, Ohio: Integrity Press, 1991.
- David M. Cummings, Dennis K. McIntire: International Who's Who in Music and Musician's Directory - (in the Classical and Light Classical Fields). Twelfth edition 1990/91, Cambridge, England: International Who's Who in Music, 1991.
- Jean Marie Londeix: Musique pour saxophone, volume II : répertoire général des oeuvres et des ouvrages d' enseignement pour le saxophone. Cherry Hill: Roncorp Publications, 1985
- Jaques Cattell Press: Who's Who in American Music : Classical, First edition. New York: R. R. Bowker, 1983.
- E. Ruth Anderson: Contemporary American composers - A Biographical Dictionary, Second edition. Boston: G. K. Hall, 1982.
