= Thomas Griselle =

American composer

Thomas Griselle (1891–1955) was an American composer who wrote much chamber music. His Two American Sketches for piano won a $10,000 prize from the Victor Talking Machine Company in 1928.

In later life he worked in Hollywood as an orchestra leader and musician. Despondent over his separation from his wife, he committed suicide in 1955. He willed his body to the school of medicine at the University of Southern California.
