= Alan Mauritz Swanson =

American composer and academic

Alan Mauritz Swanson (born Chicago, Illinois October 29, 1941) is an American composer and academic who lives in the Netherlands.

He took his BA (1963) and MA (1965) at Indiana University and his PhD at the University of Chicago (1973). In between he studied at Stockholm University. As an academic, he taught at Augustana College (Rock Island, Illinois), Brigham Young University (Provo, Utah), and the University of Groningen (the Netherlands), and came to specialize in the theatre and opera of the seventeenth and eighteenth centuries. Trained as a singer, many of his early compositions are for voice, but recent work has tended to be varied in form: string quartets, a viola concerto, a partita for piano, and others. In 2006, he was honored for his academic and community work by being appointed Officer in the Order of Oranje-Nassau.

== Partial works list ==
=== Vocal ===
==== Choral ====
- 1970: Prairie Conversation 2 voices [Alto, Baritone]
- 1970: Carol “Child, sleeping, do not wake” Trebles, solo instrumental
- 1971: Magnificat Choir SATB
- 1975: God is gone up SSA, Triangle
- 1980: Good Shepherd Variations for Choir, SSA
- 1980: Preliminary Look at Gerard Manley Hopkins’ “Pied Beauty” Baritone solo
- 1986 Agnus Dei/Lamb of God for Choir SATB
- 1988: Missa Aestiva SSAATTBB
- 2011: Alleluia: Laudate Dominum SATB
- 2013/2014: Veni sancte spiritus/Komm heiliger Geist, Gott und Herr – SSATB
- 2015: Alleluia: De profundis Choir SSA
- 2016 Domine, vivifica me Choir SSA
- 2019: Expectans expectavi for SSA choir
- 2020: O sacrum convivium for SSA
- 2020: La primera leccion for SSA and piano
- 2021: In omni tempore: Alleluia (Any number of voices)
- 2022: O magnum mysterium for Choir (SSA)
- 2023: In omni tempore for various voices
- 2024: Our Father for unison congregation

==== Songs ====
- 2010: Song-Set No. 2: Fem sånger till dikter av Arthur Landfors – Low voice, Piano
- 2017: Sur un poète moderne – Low voice, Piano
- 2018: À Arthur Rimbaud – Low voice, Piano
- 2020: Song-Set No. 3 Passage. Trois chansons, Voice and Piano
- 2021: miniLieder divers short songs for Voice and Piano (mostly)
- 2022: Song-Set No. 4: Of lost remembrance, Middle-Voice and Piano
- 2024: Song-Set No. 5: Odi et amo, for Middle-Voice and Piano
- 2025: In Porter County, for medium voice and string quartet

=== Chamber ===
==== Solo ====
- 2002-2004: Three Aspects of Time for Organ
- 2011: Partita pour piano
- 2011/12: Algorithm. Percussion solo
- 2018: Résonances – Violoncello
- 2019: Air et Badinages – Piano
- 2019: Something understood – Clarinet
- 2019: Trouvé sur un pont inconnu -Flute solo
- 2019: Spirals for clarinet solo
- 2020: And Still, I Hear It for violin solo
- 2020: There Were Twelve for violin solo

==== Ensemble ====
- 1992–93: Essay for String Quartet
- 1993–2003: Second Essay for String Quartet
- 2006: Equale per quattro tromboni, "Academic Discussion in Groningen"
- 2012/2015: Trio for Piano, Violin, and Cello
- 2015: Equale per quattro sassofoni, Tre frasi di Dante – SATBaritone Saxophones
- 2016: Away - A Trio for Violist, Dancer, and Chair
- 2016: Trio No. 2, for Piano, Violin, and Cello
- 2017: One, Two, Three – String Trio
- 2019: Words – High voice, Cello
- 2017-2020: A Third Essay for String Quartet
- 2021: In Porter County for String Quartet and Medium Voice
- 2021: A Fourth Essay for String Quartet
- 2021: Hexagons for Marimba, Xylophone, Tympani, and Conga Drums
- 2022: Seven Ways of Looking at a Line for String Trio
- 2025: A Fifth Essay for String Quartet
- 2025: Variations on an Old Tune for Xylophone and Marimba
- 2025 Required Listening for string quartet One movement i.m., John Cage

=== Orchestra ===
- 2013: Concerted Music for Viola and Strings. – Strings
- 2023: The Curve, for String orchestra
- 2023: And then, they erased the name, for Oboe d'amore and Strings

=== Libretti ===
- 2018: A Deep Black Sleep, Premiere Hobart Tasmania, February, 2023.
- 2021: The Box
