= Cassius Clement Stearns =

American composer (1838–1910)

- Born: August 23, 1838; Ashburnham, Massachusetts, U.S.
- Died: August 7, 1910 (aged 71); Sharon, Massachusetts, U.S.
- Occupations: composer, organist and music teacher
- Known for: church music

Cassius Clement Stearns (August 23, 1838 – August 7, 1910) was an American composer of church music.

== Family ==
Stearns came from a musical family. He was born on August 23, 1838, in Ashburnham, Massachusetts, the youngest child of Charles Stearns and Rebecca Green Stearns (née Robbins). He married Gertrude Bottomly of Leicester, Massachusetts, in Boston on 23 October 1872 (a few days before the Great Fire), the celebrant being the Revd. Phillips Brooks. Stearns died on 7 August 1910 in Sharon, Massachusetts.

== Life ==
Cassius Stearns, far right with bass viol, in Green's Band 1860

Stearns showed early promise, playing the bass viol with the choir in the Ashburnham meeting house from childhood. He studied the piano and organ with Professor Benjamin F. Leavens and the cello with Wulf Fries, a member of the Mendelssohn Quintette Club. Starting his musical career in Ashburnham, he moved to Worcester, Massachusetts in 1859, where he was active in the Worcester Music Festival.

Stearns was organist and director in several church choirs. For three or four years from 1867 he was the organist of the Congregational (Unitarian) Church on Court Hill, for whose new pastor he composed an anthem Awake, put on thy strength in 1869. On July 4, 1881, he played the organ at a packed Prayer Meeting at Mechanics Hall following the assassination of the President, James A. Garfield, In 1890 he was the organist and director of music at the Pleasant Street Baptist church. However, he was best known as a teacher and composer, particularly of church music, organ and piano studies and songs. He is described as a music teacher in directories for Worcester between 1860 and 1893 and taught instrumental music at the Oread Institute from 1864 to 1868. Stearns left Worcester in 1893, but after brief spells in Santa Barbara, California and Asheville, North Carolina returned to Massachusetts.

== Music ==
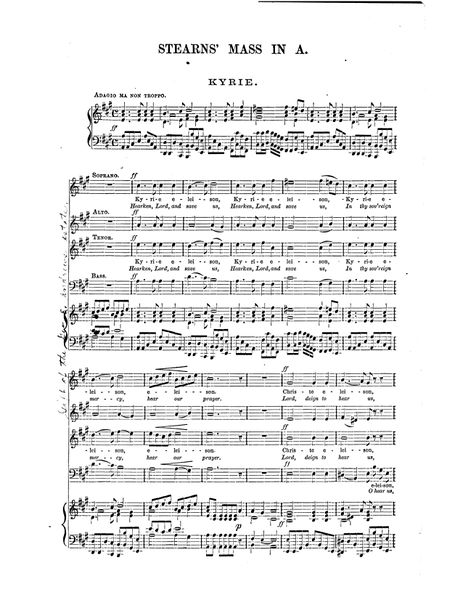
Mass in A major by Cassius Clement Stearns

Stearns' numerous compositions included several settings of the Mass and of Vespers including the Magnificat. Other compositions included a Te Deum in G and settings of the Tantum Ergo, O Salutaris Hostia, Regina Coeli and Salve Regina. These were warmly received when first performed, including at the Mechanics Hall, but were later criticized for their 'operatic' style and included on the 'black list' of disapproved music issued after the Motu proprio of Pope Pius X on Sacred Music. Stearns' settings have accordingly been little used since the early 20th century, but interest in them is now reviving. His church anthems, sacred songs, organ voluntaries and a hymnal that he edited were published by White, Smith & Company. Stearns' song The Parish Sexton was dedicated to the operatic comedian Henry Clay Barnabee, who started his career by singing in Boston churches before founding The Bostonians acting troupe.

The Parish Sexton by Cassius Clement Stearns

Stearns' output was summarized in 1890 as follows:

Model Anthems is the title of a new work for quartets and chorus choirs, by Mr. C. C. Stearns, and although only recently published, it is already meeting with a most substantial recognition by some of the best choirs in this city, as well as those in many of the country towns. Choir masters and singers are much interested in the music, which is adapted to the wants and capacities of the most cultivated choirs, and also to those of average ability. Mr. Stearns has also recently published his Easter cantata for Sunday schools, a worthy companion to his Christmas cantata. His masses in D and F, vespers in B flat and G, two masses for children's voices, entitled, Mass of the Angel Guardian and Children's Festival Mass are standard works in Catholic churches throughout the country, and two choice vocal duets, Is Life Worth Living and Hope Abides Forever for concert or church purposes, together with a trio, Father in Heaven, have met with a cordial reception from singers who are on the lookout for something new and interesting. Mr. Stearns's profession as a teacher of the piano and organ has led him to write some available compositions for these instruments and Glad Hours and Loving Hearts' Gavotte are among the most popular piano pieces. For the organ he has written two excellent books which organ students appreciate, also an illustration for the organ, Contemplation founded on the motto: 'An ever-pervading mystery broods over the universe and the soul of man, at times weird and solemn and again calm and reposeful, full of tender memories like a benediction of peace.' All of Mr. Stearns' compositions are published by the White, Smith Music company, of Boston, and the above named are a few of the most prominent ones.

There is a pastoral quality to Stearns' music, as illustrated by the evocative bird song effects in the organ part of Beatus Vir in his Vespers in G. A contemporary wrote that "Mr. Stearns has given an apt expression of his love for his native town and a sensitive appreciation of its scenic attractions, in several musical compositions, suggested by, and dedicated to the mountains and lakes of the landscape."
