= Paul Miersch =

American composer

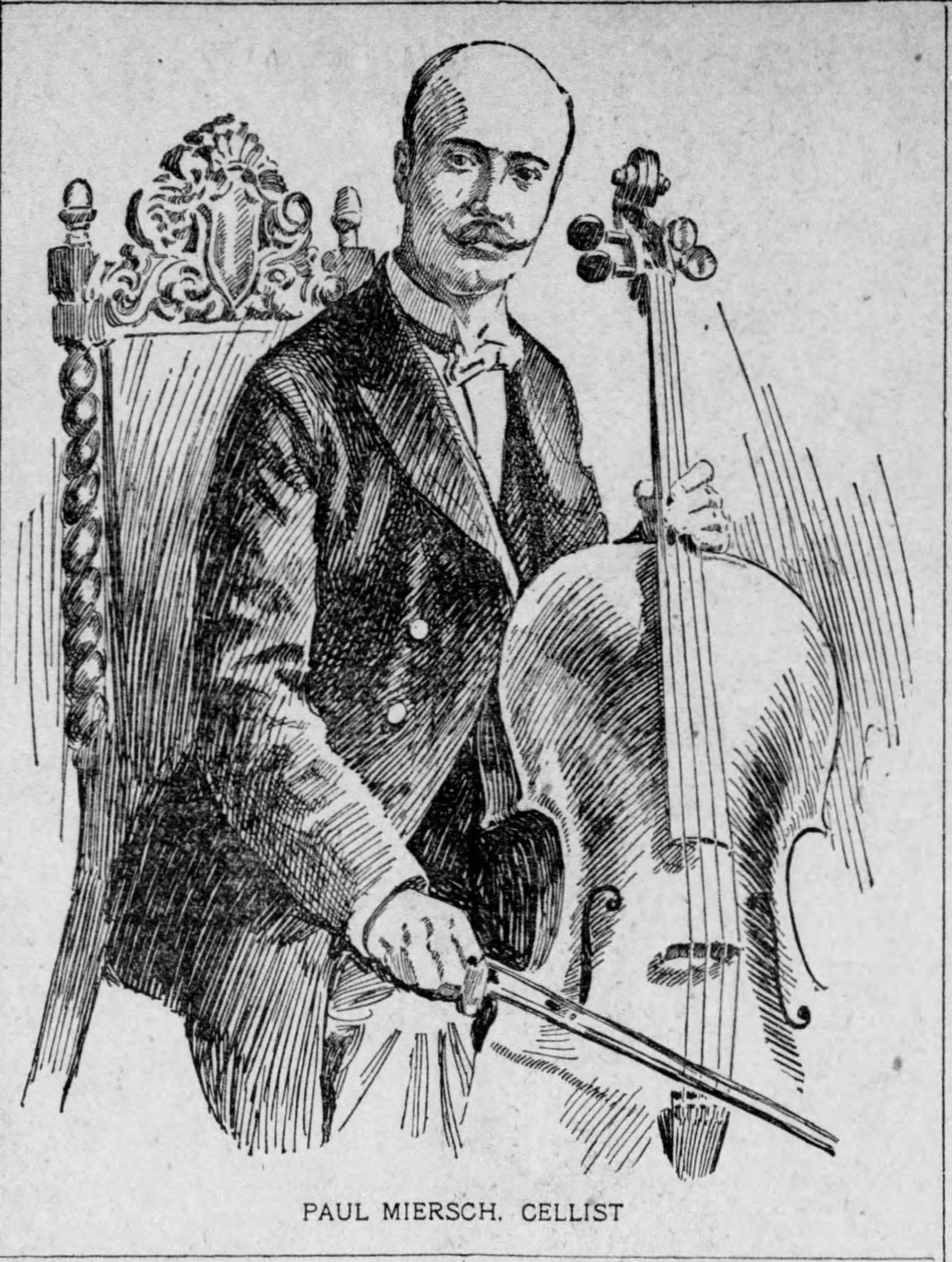
Miersch in 1899

Paul Friedrich Theodore Miersch (January 18, 1868 in Dresden – March 1, 1956 in New York City) was a German-born American composer; he came to the United States and settled in New York in 1892. In played in the 1891 Bayreuth Festival. From 1893 till 1898, he was a solo cellist of the New York Symphony Orchestra. His brother Johannes, a violinist played there as well. Among his compositions were concertos for violin and for cello, among other orchestral works. He also composed chamber music, including a string quartet, and songs.
