= Elizabeth Gyring =

American composer

Elizabeth Gyring (1886–1970) was an American composer born in Vienna, Austria.

== Early life and education ==
Gyring's father was Leopold Rethy, a laryngologist. Gyring attended the Vienna Academy of Music, studying harmony with Joseph Marx and piano with Ludwig Gzaczkes, then in 1910 composition with Arnold Schoenburg.

== Career ==
Gyring had several of her early works performed in concerts and broadcast on the radio by players from the Vienna and Berlin Philharmonic Orchestras. Following her emigration to the United States, she had a successful compositional career, with her works performed and recorded by American soloists and ensembles. Her music has been performed in Carnegie Hall and at University concert series across the United States.

== Personal life ==
She married Otto Geiringer, and in 1939 the couple emigrated to the United States; it seems that their move was partly due to the rise of the Nazi Party in Europe. In 1944 Gyring became an American citizen.

She died in New York City in 1970.

== Archive ==
A collection of her manuscripts, correspondence and papers is at Washington State University.

== Works ==
Gyring composed choral and orchestra works, chamber music, organ and works for solo instruments. Selected works include:

- The reign of violence is over (1943) (Text: Henry Wadsworth Longfellow)
- The Secret of Liberty (1945)
- Theme and Variation (1952) for piano
- Piano Sonata No.2 (1957)
- Hymn of Gratitude (1948)
- Arabesque for bassoon (1963-1964)
- Two Marches for two pianos, timpani, and triangle
- Blissful Eden, a cycle of seven songs, some settings of Joseph Rodman Drake.
- String Quartets
- Violin Concerto

Her works have been recorded and issued on CD, including:

- Harrison/ Perry/ Gyring (2010)

Several of her works were recorded on Phonograph.
