= James Cohn =

American composer (1928–2021)

James Cohn (February 12, 1928 – June 12, 2021) was a Newark, New Jersey-born American composer. After taking violin and piano lessons in his native town, he studied composition with Roy Harris, Wayne Barlow and Bernard Wagenaar, and majored in composition at Juilliard, graduating in 1950.

He wrote solo, chamber, choral and orchestral works, among them 3 string quartets, 5 piano sonatas and 8 symphonies. He was awarded a Queen Elisabeth of Belgium Prize for his Symphony No. 2 (premiered at Brussels) and an A.I.D.E.M. prize for his Symphony No. 4 (premiered in Florence at the Maggio Musicale).

His Symphony No. 3 and Variations on "The Wayfaring Stranger" were premiered by the Detroit Symphony Orchestra under Paul Paray. The Detroit Free Press observed in the Symphony No. 3 "an economy of means . . . but no yielding of inventiveness or imaginative composition. Indeed, the work throughout is marked strongly by individuality, and comes as a refreshing experience in modern music."

Among his earlier works (1946, preceding the 1948 second symphony) is a concertino for piano and orchestra.

Cohn often quoted popular tunes in many of his works, such as "Homage" (1959), based on The Star-Spangled Banner, and "A Song of the Waters," Op. 53 (1976), a tone poem featuring variations on Shenandoah.

In 1966 he composed a three-movement Concerto for Concertina and Strings, as his Op. 44.

In 2008 his 2nd and 7th symphonies were issued on compact disc by the Naxos label. In 2012 his 3rd, 4th and 8th symphonies, recorded by the Slovak Radio Symphony Orchestra conducted by Kirk Trevor, were published on compact disc by the MSR (Musicians Showcase Recordings) label.
