= Kathleen Lockhart Manning =

American composer

Kathleen Lockhart Manning

Kathleen Lockhart Manning (24 October 1890 – 20 March 1951) was an American composer. She was born on a ranch in Hollywood, California, and studied piano and composition in Paris with Moritz Moszkowski, and later with Elizabeth Jordan Eichelberger and de Sales. She sang during the 1911-1912 season with the Hammerstein Opera Company in London and also performed in the United States. After her husband died in 1938, she suffered from mental illness. She died in Los Angeles.

== Works ==
Lockhart was noted for vocal compositions and wrote her own texts. Selected works include:

- Sketches of Paris song cycle
- Sketches of New York, song cycle
- Operetta in Mozartian Style
- For the Soul of Rafael
- Japanese Ghost Songs
- Chinese Impressions
- Two Sketches of Childhood
- The Tale the Garden Told
- Autumn Leaves
- Nostalgia
- The Truant
- Chinois
- Prayer
- Departed

Her works have been recorded and issued on CD, including:

- To The Mart Of Dreams: Songs By Kathleen Lockhart Manning, Vol. 1
