= Frank Lynes =

American composer and teacher (1858–1913)

Frank Lynes (16 March 1858, Cambridge, Massachusetts – 24 June 1913, Bristol, New Hampshire) was an American composer and teacher who is primarily remembered for the piano pieces he wrote for his students; his sonatinas are essentially in a conservative classical style, reminiscent of similar works by Heinrich Lichner, Anton Diabelli, and Friedrich Kuhlau, as well as his teacher, Carl Reinecke. He studied at the New England Conservatory and at the Leipzig Conservatory.
