= Gloria Wilson Swisher =

American classical composer (1935–2023)

- Born: March 12, 1935; Seattle, Washington, U.S.
- Died: July 23, 2023 (aged 88); Edmonds, Washington, U.S.
- Education: University of Washington; Mills College; Eastman School of Music
- Occupations: Composer, music educator and pianist

Gloria Wilson Swisher (March 12, 1935 – July 23, 2023) was an American composer, music educator and pianist.

== Biography ==
Gloria Wilson Swisher was born in Seattle, Washington. She graduated from the University of Washington in Seattle where she received a Bachelor of Music degree, summa cum laude, Mills College in Oakland, California, where she earned a Master of Music in composition, and the Eastman School of Music in Rochester, New York, where she earned a Ph.D. in 1960. She studied composition under John Verrall, Darius Milhaud, Bernard Rogers, and Howard Hanson. She was a member of The International Association of Women in Music, the Darius Milhaud Society and the American Society of Composers, Authors and Publishers. Swisher was awarded the Sigma Alpha Iota Inter-American prize for her composition Salutations for oboe and piano. Swisher was the subject of a 2009 University of Washington dissertation, The choral music of Gloria Wilson Swisher, by Robert Bigley.

Swisher taught at Washington State University in Pullman, Pacific Lutheran University in Tacoma, Shoreline Community College (1969–1998) in Seattle, and the University of Washington in Seattle. She was a Professor Emerita of Music at Shoreline Community College, and often performed as a duo pianist with Nancy Matesky. Swisher was a founding member of Ars Nova Press, Inc., a non-profit corporation that promotes and reprints the work of quality composers. Swisher died on July 23, 2023, at the age of 88.

== Works ==
Selected works include:

Orchestral works:

- 1957: Canción, for orchestra
- 1960: Concerto for clarinet and orchestra
- 1986: Niigata No. Sumie Black Ink Impressions of Niigata, concerto for piano and orchestra
- 2004: Concerto for flute and orchestra
- Serafina, portrait for orchestra

Works for large ensemble:

- 1955: 3 Pieces for Piano & Band
- 1958: Suite for Piano & Wind Sinfonietta
- 1963: Dances for Tomorrow
- 1977: Thanksgiving I
- 1978: Procession
- 1984: Words to a Grand Child, for mixed choir and orchestra
- The Mountain and The Island

Masses and liturgical music:

- Psalm 150 for mixed choir, 2 trumpets, timpani and piano
- God is Gone Up With A Merry Noise, for mixed choir and organ

Stage works: Opera:

- 1983: The Artist and The Other - libretto: Willy Clark
- 1999: The Prestigious Music Award - premiered on February 18–20, 1999, at the Shoreline Community College Little Theater - libretto: Willy Clark
- 2008: The Legend of Poker Alice - libretto: Willy Clark

Theatre:

- 2004: Gallagher and the Moonbeam
- Incidental music to For Such A Time as This - text: Ann Chamberlin

Works for choir:

- 1973: Two Faces of Love, for mixed choir and piano
- Beat! Beat! Drums, for mixed choir, 2 trumpets, timpani and piano
- Let Us Celebrate, for mixed choir, 2 trumpets and piano

Vocal music:

- 1977: Sisters, for soprano and piano
- I Sit and Sew
- Tenebris
- The Cabal at Nickel Nackeys
- 1983: Sonnets for Donald, for soprano and piano
- 1990: Three for T, for tenor and piano
- 1995: A Velvet Madonna, for soprano and piano
- Montana, song cycle of six songs for mezzo soprano or baritone and piano

Chamber music

- 1990: Salutations, for oboe and piano
- 1991: Caprichos for guitar and piano
- Pas de trois, for flute, violin and piano
- Sado, for flute and piano
- Theatre Trio for trumpet, alto saxophone and piano

Works for organ:

- 2001: Chorale Prelude on "Slane" and "In Dulce Jubilo"

Works for piano:

- 1983: "Joel" Variations
- Siciliana
- Transcending
