= Abbie Gerrish-Jones =

American composer and librettist

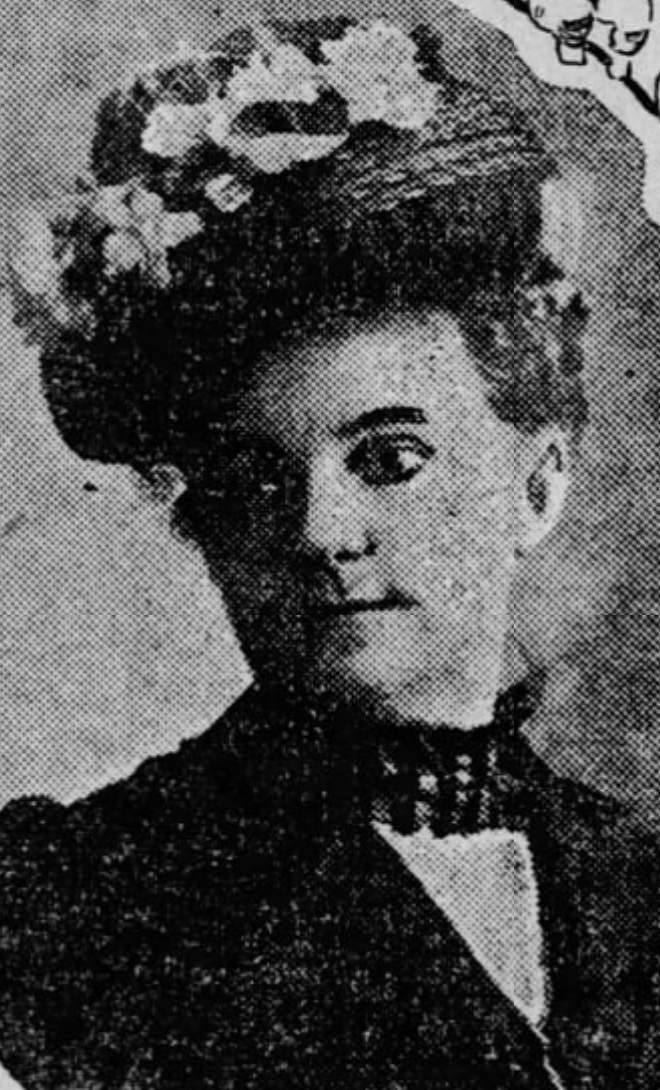
- Abbie Gerrish-Jones, from a 1901 newspaper
- Born: Abbie Jane Gerrish; September 10, 1863; Vallejo, California, U.S.
- Died: February 5, 1929 (aged 65); Seattle, Washington, U.S.
- Other name: Abbie Gerrish-Genung
- Occupations: Composer, librettist, music writer

Abbie Jane Gerrish-Jones (September 10, 1863 – February 5, 1929) was an American composer, librettist and music writer.

== Early life and education ==
Abbie Gerrish was born in Vallejo, California, and grew up in Sacramento, the daughter of Samuel Howard Gerrish and Sarah Jane Rogers Gerrish. Both of her parents were born in New England; her father kept weather records for Sacramento. She began playing piano and composing at an early age and studied with Charles Winter.

== Career ==
Gerrish-Jones composed nine operas. She also wrote over 100 songs. Her opera Priscilla is considered the first complete opera with both libretto and score composed by an American woman. One of her compositions won the Josef Hoffmann prize for "best American piano work". Her songs for children were used in California public schools. Several concerts were given in California which featured Gerrish-Jones's music exclusively, including "The Evening of Song" in Sacramento in 1906, and another in San Francisco in 1913. "They are the expression of a melodic gift which is often of great charm," wrote critic Redfern Mason about Gerrish-Jones' compositions in 1914, "supplemented by a keen sensibility to exotic influences and the charm of outdoor nature."

Gerrish-Jones wrote about music for Pacific Town Talk, The Pacific Coast Musical Review and Musical Courier. She also taught music, and was a church organist and choir director.

== Selected works ==
- Priscilla (1887) opera
- Abon Hassan
- Andalusians
- Milk Maids Fair
- Sakura, opera (with Gerta Weismer Hoffmann)
- The Snow Queen, music drama (with Gerta Weismer Hoffmann)
- Childhood (a song cycle)
- "If I were thou" (song, based on text by Elizabeth Barrett Browning)
- "The Meadowlark" (song)
- "My Dear Little Irish Rose" (song)
- "Impatience" (song)
- "My Love o' You" (song)
- "Nile Song" song)

== Personal life ==
Abbie Gerrish married James Edward Genung. Her second husband was Arnold (or Arno) W. Jones. She also had three daughters. Gerrish-Jones died in Seattle, Washington.
