= Edward Benjamin Scheve =

American composer

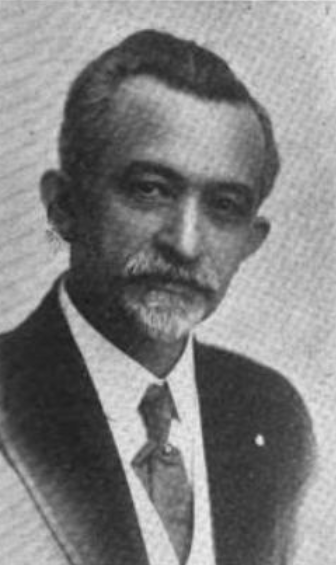
Edward Scheve

Edward Benjamin Scheve (1865–1924) was an American composer and music educator, best known for his tenure at Grinnell College.

He was born February 13, 1865 in Herford, Germany. His father was a Baptist minister who worked in Germany and America, well known for mission work in Cameroon. He studied at the Kullak Academy in Berlin, after which he taught at Kullak from 1886 to 1888 and became an organist and composer.

He emigrated to the United States, settling first in Rochester, New York where he was an organist. From 1902 to 1906 he directed a music school in Chicago. In 1906, he moved to Grinnell, Iowa and became a professor at Grinnell College, where he taught music and in 1912 received a doctorate in music.

He wrote a number of orchestral works, including a symphony and two concertos; he also composed for choir, and wrote oratorios and anthems. His output also includes some songs and works for piano and violin. Scheve died in Longmont, Colorado in 1924.

== Selected works ==
- Violin sonata in C minor
- Organ sonata in E♭ major
- Death and Resurrection of Christ, oratorio (1908)
- Twilight pictures op. 31, seven sketches for piano
