= Gregory Short =

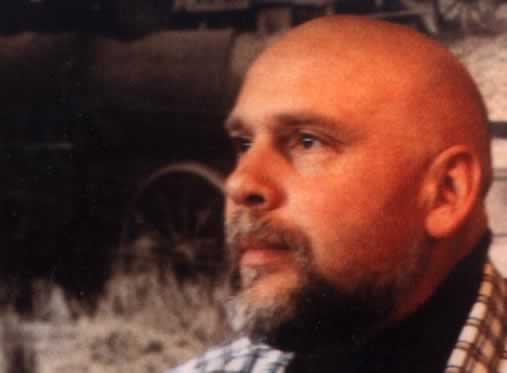
- Short in 1999

Background information
- Born: Gregory Norman Short; August 14, 1938; Toppenish, Washington, United States
- Died: April 1, 1999 (aged 60) Freeland, Washington, United States
- Genres: Classical, Traditional songs and music
- Occupations: Composer, pianist
- Instruments: Piano, keyboards
- Years active: 1960s–1999
- Labels: Albany, Koch

Gregory Norman Short (August 14, 1938 – April 1, 1999) was a composer, educator, and performer. He was born in Toppenish, Washington, the largest city in the Yakima Indian Reservation. Later, he attended the Juilliard School and University of Washington. He received a Doctor of Musical Arts in Composition from the University of Oregon.

== Biography ==
In 1961, Short began teaching piano students in performance and music theory. He created new music that blended classical European–American styles with American–Indian melodies that earned recognition beyond the Northwest. He combined Native–American influences with European–American music for a sound that was compelling rather than being a cliche. He used ethnic themes in many of the 300 compositions he created over 35 years.

Many of his compositions drew inspiration from the people and environment of the state of Washington, where he was an active composer and pianist as a long-time resident on Puget Sound. Short was named the 1989 Washington State Centennial Artist. He taught at the college and university level for decades. As a member of the Washington State Teachers Association, Short served as an adjudicator. In 1989, WTA selected him as Composer of the Year and commissioned him to write a piece.

The prominent American folklorist Stacy I. Morgan points out that he crosses musical categories, "the boundaries between folk, high, and popular culture categories were and are inevitably porous. For example, "Froggie Went A-Courting", a ballad dating at least to sixteenth century England and circulated for generations by both oral and written traditions, finds modern adaptations by US artists as dissimilar as the classical composer Gregory Short (as part of his American Bicentennial Sonata no. 4 from 1976) and top recording star Bruce Springsteen (on the 2006 album We Shall Overcome: The Seeger Sessions).

Coming to prominence as a pianist featuring all-American music and Northwest composer recitals in the early 1960s, Short was the first to perform entire programs of American composers. He created "The American Composer", a 1968–69 television series that featured the music of Northwest composers. "Fog Woman" was performed by the Bremerton Symphony. His other works include "The Raven Speaks and "Mount Takhoma (Tacoma)".

Much of Short's inspiration came from Northwest Native American traditional culture. "I felt there a genuine spirituality. That nature and man are the same. And between the real world and the spirit world, there is no division." He completed a four-part cycle of compositions about the dynamics of the mountains and original people in the Northwest. In addition to Native American cultural traditions, he found inspirational themes in the Bible, novels of J. R. R. Tolkien, essays of Khalil Gibran, and pivotal social changes such as the assassination of Martin Luther King Jr.

With a long career as a pianist, "I wanted to put together the life I wanted to live. [Writing music] is kind of like you are in trance. I know that I put in a lot of time." He tried to write each day from 9 a.m. until 2 p.m., and most days he was back at his worktable by 6 p.m. for another two or three hours of composition. As with Charles Ives, whose music manuscripts Short found at the Juilliard library, he sought to express the entire universe in music. In the years before his death, Short was composing and arranging for piano and orchestra with the aid of his computer. Moreover, he was working on a film score and a book. His song cycle on Native American poetry was performed in Boston, MA, before his death.

== Recorded works ==
- Northwest Composers Vol. II (Florence Mesler Recordings, 1972) Gregory Short, The Pilgrim, song cycle for soprano, piano, and percussion from Kim Si-sup's poem translated by David Mesler; Florence Mesler (Lyric-Spinto Soprano), Gregory Short (Piano), and Phil Curtis assisted by Roy Freedman (percussion) )
- Celebrating Six Years at the Met (Random Touch Records, Inc., 1994) Gregory Short: Blue Dawn; Kendall Feeney (piano), James Schoepflin (clarinet), and Charlotte Bickford (violin)
- Reflections of the Northwest (TROY 184, 1995) Gregory Short, The Raven Speaks, based on Northwest Coast Indian Songs and Dances; Northwest Symphony Orchestra conducted by Anthony Spain
- Natural Symphony - Featuring Seattle's Finest Classical Musical Artists (Classical KING-FM 98.1, 1999) Gregory Short, Mt. Takhoma; Northwest Symphony Orchestra conducted by Anthony Spain
- "Soli Deo Gloria" (Stephen H. Owades, 1999) Gregory Short, Mass; Richard Clark (cantor); Jeremy Friedman, Matt Masie, and Zhanna Maysyuk (percussion); Paul Chudigian (electronics setup); conducted by John Zielinski
- The Basket (NXNW 080199, 1999) Gregory Short additional orchestrations
- Pahto, for large orchestra (Dialekt Recordings, 2000) Gregory Short, Pahto; Northwest Symphony Orchestra conducted by Anthony Spain
- Mystical Mountains (KOCH 3-7399-2 HI, 2001) Gregory Short, Mount Takhoma; Northwest Symphony Orchestra conducted by Anthony Spain
