= Roger Briggs =

American composer, conductor and pianist (b.1952)

- Born: May 28, 1952 (age 73); Florence, Alabama
- Occupations: Professor, composer, conductor
- Instrument: Piano
- Website: rogerbriggs.com

Roger Briggs (born May 28, 1952) is an American composer, conductor, pianist, and educator.

== Biography ==
Roger Briggs, born and raised in Florence, Alabama, began playing the piano at age 8 and composing by age 11. His earliest teachers were Norman Hill (1960–67) and Walter Urben (1967-70) who taught at the University of North Alabama. He earned a Bachelor of Music Degree (1974) in Composition and Piano Performance from the University of Memphis where he studied composition with Johannes Smit and Don Freund, piano with Herbert Hermann, and conducting with Richard Earhart. He then studied at the Eastman School of Music, where he earned a Master of Music (1976) and Ph.D. (1978) in Music Composition. At Eastman he studied composition with Samuel Adler, Joseph Schwantner, Eugene Kurtz, Warren Benson, and Russel Peck. He studied conducting with Gustav Meier.

In 1978, Briggs was appointed Professor of Composition and Conducting at Saint Mary's College, Notre Dame, Indiana, where he founded the Michiana New Music Ensemble, and received his first national and international recognition as a composer with works such as the solo piano work, Spirals, the chamber orchestra work, Gathering Together, and the chamber work, Chamber Music.

During this period Briggs completed post-doctoral work at the Dartington Institute in Totnes, England where he studied composition and contemporary conducting techniques with Sir Peter Maxwell Davies and John Carewe. In 1984 he studied vocal composition with composer Ned Rorem. He received several awards including three MacDowell Colony Fellowships, an NEA Composer Grant, two Meet the Composer Grants, and an ASCAP Award for Young Composers, among others.

In 1989, Briggs was appointed Professor of Composition and Piano at Western Washington University, where he founded the Contemporary Chamber Players and was appointed conductor of the University Symphony and the Opera Program. He received a Logan Seminar Fellowship, the Washington State Composer of the Year Award, and two Washington State Arts Commission Awards.

In 1996, Briggs accepted the Artistic Director post with the Whatcom Symphony Orchestra and soon established the Whatcom Symphony Chamber Orchestra and the Music by American Composers Commissioning Series. He has also helped establish an impressive orchestral/educational outreach program in the Bellingham area.

In 2005 the American Academy of Arts and Letters honored Briggs with the Lieberson Award for excellence in composition, and in 2010 the League of American Orchestras awarded him an ASCAP Award for programming contemporary orchestral music. He has conducted and recorded with the London Symphony Orchestra, the Czech Radio Orchestra, and the Prague Symphony Orchestra. His orchestral music has been performed by the Prague Symphony, the Seattle Symphony, the South Bend Symphony, and many other chamber orchestras in the United States. His chamber works have been performed by many established ensembles including the Da Capo Chamber Players, the New Performance Group, the Pittsburgh New Music Ensemble, Fear No Music, Zephyr, Third Angle and the Buffalo New Music Ensemble. His works for piano have been performed around the world. He also contributed music to the video game Civilization III.
