= John Verrall (composer) =

American composer (1908–2001)

- Born: June 17, 1908
- Died: April 15, 2001 (aged 92)
- Genre: contemporary classical music

John Weedon Verrall (June 17, 1908 – April 15, 2001) was an American composer of contemporary classical music.

== Life ==
Prior to his University studies, Verrall studied composition with Donald Ferguson, followed by studies with R. O. Morris in London and Zoltán Kodály in Budapest. He obtained a BM degree from the Minneapolis School of Music in 1929, and a BA from the University of Minnesota in 1934. In the early 1930s he spent several summers at the Berkshire Music Center at Tanglewood, where he studied composition with Aaron Copland, Roy Harris, and Frederick Jacobi. He taught at Hamline University from 1934 to 1942 and Mount Holyoke College from 1942 to 1946, during which time he briefly served in the U.S. Army during the World War II era. While teaching at Mount Holyoke College, Verall also worked as a music editor for G. Schirmer. In 1946 he was awarded a Guggenheim Fellowship. In 1948 he joined the music faculty at the University of Washington, where he taught composition and music theory until he retired as professor emeritus in 1973. Several of Verrall's students have gone on to have successful careers, including William Bolcom, Alan Stout, and Gloria Wilson Swisher. See: List of music students by teacher: T to Z#John Verrall.

== Compositions ==
Verrall wrote numerous symphonic works and chamber music pieces including four symphonies, seven string quartets, a violin concerto, and a viola concerto, among many other works. He also wrote several vocal art songs, choral works, and three operas. He also wrote a composition for carillon in 1966.

== Personal life ==
His wife was named Margaret. He died of congestive heart failure at his home in Laurelhurst, Seattle, Washington, at the age of 92.

The John Verrall Papers are held by the Special Collections department of the University of Washington Libraries.

== Sources ==
- Richard Swift. The New Grove Dictionary of Opera, edited by Stanley Sadie (1992). ISBN 0-333-73432-7 and ISBN 1-56159-228-5
