= Rosamonde Safier =

American musician (1912-1992)

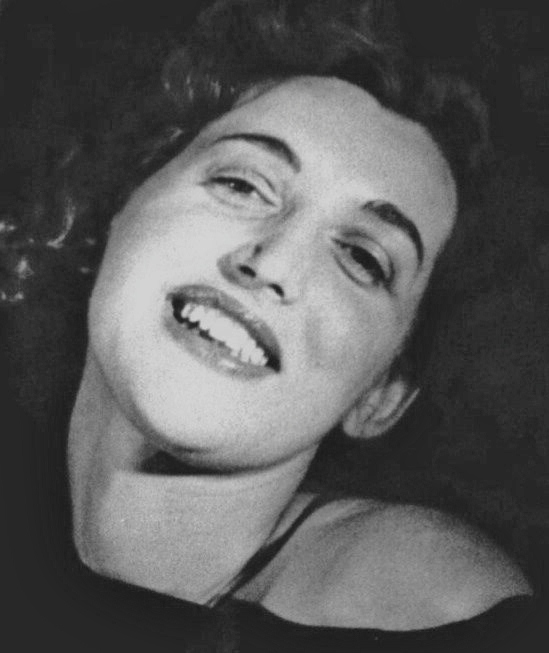
- Born: Rosamonde Elsie Safier; September 9, 1912; Monessen, Pennsylvania, U.S.
- Died: December 7, 1992 (aged 80); New York City, U.S.
- Occupation(s): Musical composer, pianist
- Years active: 1931–1949

Rosamonde (Rhody or Rody) Elsie Safier (1912–1992), mariée Marks, was a Tin Pan Alley composer, whose songs were promoted by Rudy Vallée and George Gershwin. Her most prominently performed songs, also arranged for band, were "Blue Lady", "Swing Low Sweet Harriet", and "Because I’ve Known Love." Musical collaborators included William Howard Schuman and Lenore Oppenheimer mariée Hershey.

== Biography and musical career ==
Born to Joseph and Sarah Goldberg Safier in Monessen, Pennsylvania, on September 9, 1912, the youngest of five siblings, "Rody" Safier composed twenty songs while still in high school, and played two of them for Helen Kane in the Stanley Theater. She wrote to George Gershwin, "People here at home think that I have talent. But I’m not sure whether it is big or small. If I ever come to New York, would you hear my songs and tell me the truth?" Gershwin wrote back, "Yes."

After high school, Safier moved to New York City, where she attended the Institute for Musical Art (now known as the Juilliard School). During that time she contacted Gershwin, who invited her to his apartment for an audition and listened to her music for over an hour. One of the songs she played for him was "Blue Lady", which he then played back to her. Before the year (1931) was out, just-turned-19-year-old Safier's "Blue Lady" had been published by Harms and sung by Rudy Vallée on his live radio show, The Fleischmann Hour.

Also an accomplished pianist and accompanist, Safier performed her classical composition, "Strange Fantasie", in Carnegie Hall in 1934. Her professional career culminated with a six-year stint (1943–1949) as audition secretary at New York radio station, WOR. Married to New York architect Irving Philip Marks in 1947 in Temple Emanu-El, Safier eventually left the music world when they had their only child, Joel Howard Marks. Predeceased by her husband, Safier Marks died in New York City on December 7, 1992, and is buried in Versailles, Pennsylvania.

== Compositions ==
An archive of Safier's published and unpublished songs is housed in the Lila Acheson Wallace Library at the Juilliard School in Manhattan.

== Legacy ==
A birth centennial celebration of Safier's life and work took place at Yale University during the 2011–2012 academic year, featuring two cabarets at the GPSCY Ballroom by the Yale Jazz Ensemble on December 4, 2011, and other works performed at the Stan Wheeler Memorial Jazz Concert on April 15, 2012.
