= Bern Herbolsheimer =

American composer

- Born: September 2, 1948; Great Falls, Montana, U.S.
- Died: January 13, 2016 (aged 67); Seattle, Washington, U.S.

Bern Herbolsheimer (September 2, 1948 – January 13, 2016) was an American composer.

== Biography ==
Bern Herbolsheimer received recognition throughout the United States and Europe for over 500 works ranging from ballet to symphonic, operatic, chamber and choral works. His numerous major commissions and premieres included ballets for the Frankfurt Ballet, the Atlanta Ballet, the Pacific Northwest Ballet, and the Eugene Ballet. His first opera, Aria da Capo, won first prize in the National Opera Association's New Opera Competition. Mark Me Twain, his second opera, was commissioned and premiered in 1993 by the Nevada Opera for its Silver Anniversary season. "The opera is filled with attractive, dramatic, often eloquent music ... it could become an American work of genuine significance."

His Symphony No. 1 was premiered by the Florida Symphony under conductor Kenneth Jean. Other orchestral music was premiered by the Seattle Symphony, Northwest Symphony Orchestra, and Music Today in New York under the direction of Gerard Schwarz. His vocal and choral works were performed in Portugal, Spain, Germany, France, Italy, Australia, South America, Canada, Norway, Russia, Hungary, Japan, and throughout the United States. According to the Seattle Weekly, who named him as Best (Classical) Composer in 2005, "no Seattle composer has a more assured and polished craft than Herbolsheimer. His choral writing — and there's a lot of it — is luminous and subtle".

His final premieres were his chamber opera The Quartet at Carnegie Hall and Gold and Silver in Steven Soderbergh's HBO hit series The Knick. He died shortly before the UK premiere of his Seven Last Words performed by The Willow Concert in 2017.

A frequent award winner, Herbolsheimer was Seattle Artist-in-Residence (Seattle Arts Commission), Washington State Composer of the Year (WSMTA), and winner of the Melodious Accord Choral Music Competition (Te Deum), in addition to the National Opera Association's New Opera Competition (Aria da Capo). He was also the recipient of composition commissions from the National Endowment for the Arts (Symphony No. 1), Chamber Music America (Tanguy Music), the Seattle Symphony (In Mysterium Tremendum), and from numerous local organizations such as Seattle Men's Chorus, Seattle Choral Company, St. James Cathedral, Opus 7, Seattle Pro Musica, the Esoterics and the Cascadian Chorale. His works appear on dozen of CDs.

As pianist, Herbolsheimer accompanied at the Bergen International Music Festival, the Schloss Elmau Festival, and on concert series for Columbia Artists, Saint Martin's Abbey, the Spanish Institute, the Goethe Institute, the American Opera Festival of the Sierra, Estoril/Cascais Concerts in Portugal, the Tatarstan Opera in Kazan, Battelle Institute, the Ojai Music Festival, and regularly in the Western Washington area.

Herbolsheimer served on the music faculty of Seattle's Cornish College, where he taught composition-related classes and held a private studio, and the University of Washington, where he taught graduate classes in the voice program. At the end of the 2000–2001 school year he was selected as the Outstanding Teacher of Music at Cornish College.

He was a Northwest composer and was a member of BMI.

== Death ==
Herbolsheimer died at his home in Seattle on January 13, 2016.

== Discography ==
Let Us Sing Sweet Songs

David Mourns for Absalom

THE VISITATION OF THE PRIORY OF ST. MICHAEL THE ARCHANGEL WITHOUT STAMFORD

Ashik Dances Before His Love

Te Deum O Lord, save thy people

Seven Last Words

Kader kiç

Love letters

Love letters

Botanas

As Water Ascends to a Cloud

Silly Shepherds Stop Your Sleeping

/ WSeven Last Words

== Partial list of works ==
Composition	Genre	Year	Notes
Symphony #1	Orchestral		
Mark Me Twain	Opera	1993	
Aria Da Capo	Opera		4 instruments
Childsplay	Chamber	2004	4 instruments
Stille Nacht	Choral	2004	SATB
Once in Royal David's City	Choral		SATB
The Visitation ...	Vocal		
O Lord, Increase My Faith	Choral		SATBs
In Mysterium Tremendum	Chamber		
Kader kiç	Choral	2005	
Lady in Waiting	Vocal		
Love Letters	Choral	2005	
Childsworld	Chamber	2006	
As Water Ascends to a Cloud	Choral	2006	
By the Waters of Babylon	Choral	2006	
Box Ek T'Ho	Instrumental	2007	
Dos Suenos	Choral	2008	SATB & Chamber Orchestra
La Pitaya	Choral	2007	
Musicians Wrestle Everywhere	Choral	2007	
