= Adolph Weiss =

American composer

Adolph Weiss (Baltimore, Maryland, November 12, 1891 – Van Nuys, California, February 21, 1971) was an American composer. A modernist, he was a pupil of Arnold Schoenberg in Vienna from 1924 to 1927; his father was a pupil of Ferruccio Busoni. He also served as a professional bassoonist in a number of orchestras, including the New York Philharmonic, the New York Symphony Society, the Rochester Symphony, the Los Angeles Philharmonic, the San Francisco Symphony, and the Chicago Symphony.
