= Wayne Barlow =

American composer

Wayne Brewster Barlow (September 6, 1912, in Elyria, Ohio – December 17, 1996, in Rochester, NY) was an American composer of classical music. He was also a professor of music, organist, and choir director.

== Life and career ==
Barlow received bachelor's, master's, and doctoral degrees from the Eastman School of Music, majoring in composition and theory and becoming in 1937 the first American to receive a doctorate in music composition. He also studied with Arnold Schoenberg in California, as well as with Myron Schaeffer, the director of the Electronic Music Laboratory at the University of Toronto. He served as a professor at the Eastman School of Music from 1937 to 1978, where he directed the Electronic Music Studio from 1968 to 1978, and also served as Dean of Graduate Studies from 1973 to 1978. From 1978 to 1996 he held the position of Emeritus Professor of Composition at the Eastman School of Music. His notable students include James Cohn, Lucrecia Kasilag, Samuel Jones, Martin Mailman, Norma Wendelburg, and Don Freund.

External audio
- You may hear Wayne Barlow's The Winter's Past for Oboe and String Orchestra performed by Howard Hanson conducting the Eastman-Rochester Symphony Orchestra and Robert Sprenkle, oboe in 1941 Here on archive.org

Among his best-known compositions is The Winter's Passed, for oboe and string orchestra.

He died at the age of 84.

His manuscripts are held by the Sibley Music Library of the Eastman School of Music, University of Rochester.

== Works ==
Stage

- False faces, Choral Ballet in a prologue and 2 scenes (1935); libretto by Leone Coffer
- Three Moods for Dancing, ballet for orchestra (1940)
- The Black Madonna, ballet in 3 scenes, adapted from the play by William Sharp (1941)

Orchestral

- De Profundis, Symphonic Poem (1934)
- Nocturne for small orchestra (1946)
- Rondo-Overture (1947)
- Night Song (1956)
- Sinfonia da camera (1960)
- Vistas (1963)
- Rota for chamber orchestra (1959)
- Hampton Beach, Overture (1971)
- Soundscapes for orchestra and tape (1972)

Band or Wind or brass ensemble

- Frontiers, for symphonic band (1982)
- Requiem and Alleluia, for trombone choir (1991)
- Fanfare for the University of Alabama, for trumpets

Concertante

- The Winter's Passed for oboe and string orchestra (1940)
- Lyrical Piece for clarinet and string orchestra (1947)
- Images for harp and orchestra (1961); additional version for harp, clarinet, and string quartet (1963)
- Elegy, for viola and orchestra (1968)
- Divertissement for flute and chamber orchestra (1980)

Chamber music

- Prelude, Air and Variation for bassoon, string quartet and piano (1947)
- Quintet for piano and strings (1951)
- Triptych for string quartet (1953)
- Intrada, Fugue and Postlude for brass ensemble (1960)
- Trio for oboe, viola, and piano (1964)
- Elegy for viola and piano (1967)
- Duo for harp and tape (1971)
- Intermezzo for viola and harp (1980)

Piano

- Impressionist (1940)
- Sonata for Piano (1947)
- Dynamisms for 2 pianos (1966)
- Prelude in E (? 1968)

Organ

- Three Christmas Tunes (1960)
- Four Chorale Voluntaries (1981)

Vocal

- Zion in Exile, Cantata for soprano, tenor, baritone and bass soli, mixed chorus and orchestra (1937)
- Madrigal for a Bright Morning for mixed chorus (1942); words by John R. Slater
- The Twenty-Third Psalm for mixed chorus and organ (1943)
- Three Songs after Shakespeare for soprano and piano (1948)
- Mass in G for mixed chorus and orchestra (1951)
- Poems for Music, Four Songs for soprano and orchestra (1958); poems by Robert Hillyer
- Diversify the Abyss for male chorus and piano (1963); words by Hyam Plutzik
- Missa Sanctis Thomae for unison voices (1963)
- We All Believe in One True God for mixed chorus, brass quartet (ad libitum) and organ (1965); words by Tobias Clausnitzer
- Wait for the Promise of the Father for soloists, chorus, organ, and orchestra (1968)
- Voices of Darkness for reader, piano, percussion and tape (1974)
- Voices of Faith for soprano solo, narrator, mixed chorus and orchestra (1975)
- Out of the Cradle Endlessly Rocking for chamber chorus, tenor solo, clarinet, viola, piano, and electronic tape (1978)
- The Seven Seals of Revelation for chorus and orchestra (1989)

Electronic media

- Study in Electronic Sound (1965)
- Moonflight (1970)
- Soundprints in Concrete (1975)

== Books ==
- Foundations of Music.
