= C. Mortimer Wiske =

American choral conductor and organist (1853–1934)

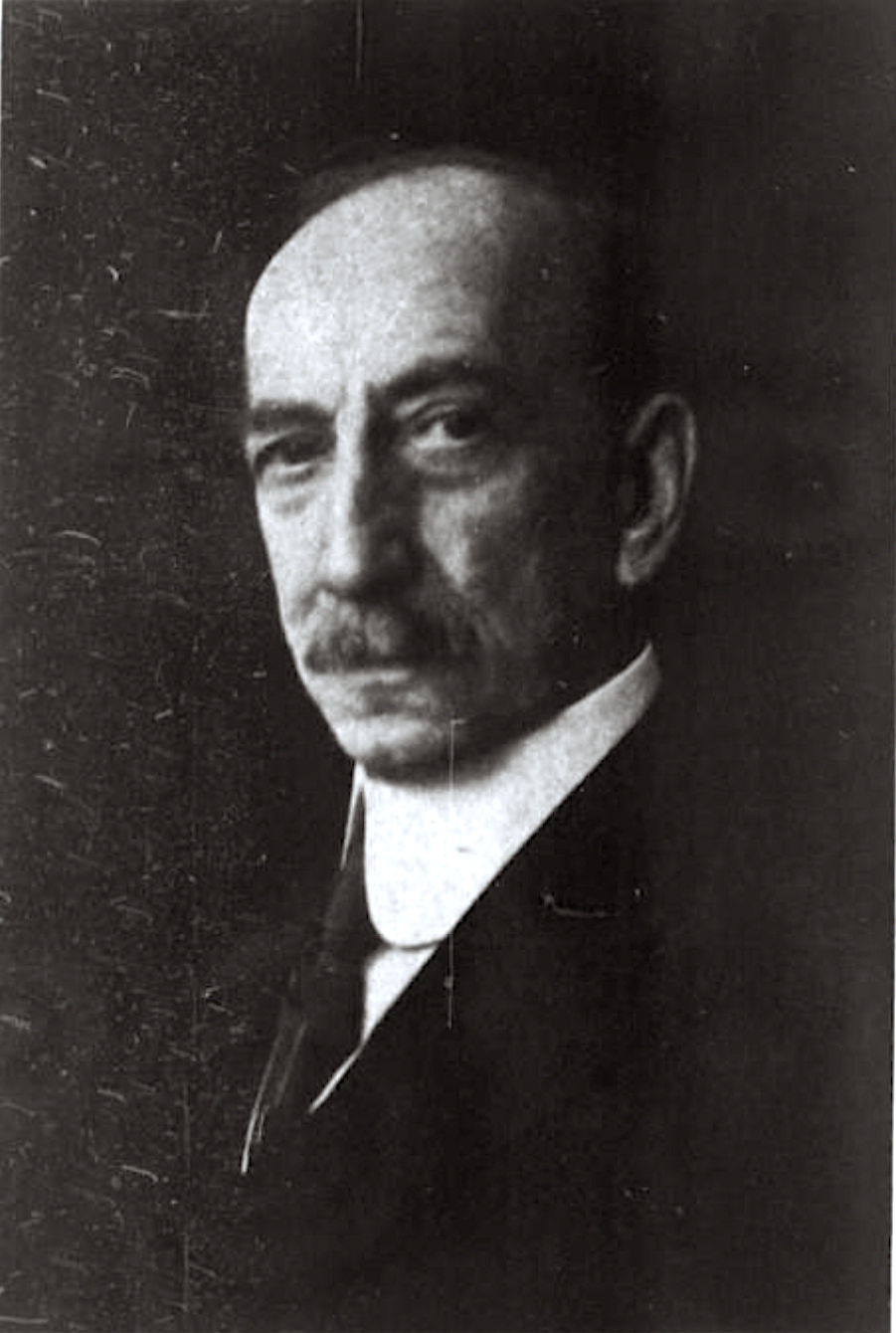
C. Mortimer Wiske in 1921

Charles Mortimer Wiske (also spelled Whiskey or Wiskey), (January 12, 1853 – July 9, 1934) was an American choral conductor, organist, and composer. Born in Bennington, Vermont, and raised in Troy, New York, Wiske began working as an organist at the age of twelve. In 1872 he moved to New York City where he became a prominent organist and choir director in Brooklyn. He founded and/or led several notable choirs, among them the Amphion Musical Society, the Brooklyn Choral Society, the Orpheus Glee Club, and the Caecilia Ladies Vocal Society. He spent five years as choirmaster for Theodore Thomas and his orchestra. In 1896 he moved to Paterson, New Jersey where he worked for several churches. He was the longtime director of the Patterson Music Festival and Newark Music Festival, the latter of which he founded in 1915. He continued to lead these New Jersey music festivals until his retirement in 1930. In his later life he divided his time between his home in Paterson and a farm/inn he built in Woodstock, New York where he also operated a music camp.

== Early life and career ==
Born in Bennington, Vermont on January 12, 1853, Charles Mortimer Wiskey (later consistently spelled Wiske) was the son of Charles H Wiskey. He was educated in Troy, New York, where he studied music with F. Davis and F. J. Guy. He began working as an organist at the age of 12 at Tibbits Chapel (now All Saints Church) in Hoosick, New York. He remained in that position until moving to New York City in 1872.

By 1874 Wiske was active as a conductor in Brooklyn, New York, with the Greenpoint Choral Union and the Eastern District Choral Union. At that time he was working as the organist at the Episcopal Church of the Ascension on Kent Street in Greenpoint. He left that post in 1875 to become organist and choirmaster at Bedford Avenue Reformed Church (BARC) in Bushwick. He was simultaneously director of the music program of the Young People's Association in Brooklyn. He also became conductor of the Brooklyn Choral Union in 1875, leading that choir for three years.

In 1876 Wiske began teaching classes in piano, voice, and music theory at the newly formed Brooklyn University of Musical Art and Science at 96 S 10th Street. That same year he composed Campaign Waltzes, for the U.S. presidential campaign of Rutherford B. Hayes and William A. Wheeler, was published by George Molineux. He later composed the comic opera Criss Cross—the Man of Mark (1879) which used a libretto by William Dinsmore. A satire of American politics in a similar vein as Gilbert and Sullivan's treatment of the Royal Navy in H.M.S. Pinafore, it was one of the earliest operas to feature life in America within its plot. Excerpts from this opera were performed in December 1879 by the Brooklyn Operatic Club at Smithsonian Hall in Greenpoint with Wiske conducting.

== Amphion Musical Society and other work in New York ==
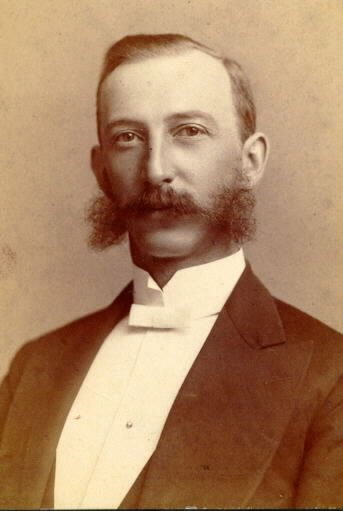
C. Mortimer Wiske in 1886

In 1880 Wiske left his post at BARC to become organist and choirmaster at Hanson Place Baptist Church. That same year he founded the Amphion Musical Society (AMS), a chorus in Brooklyn which presented three concerts annually at the Brooklyn Academy of Music (BAM). Its membership encompassed 400 singers. From 1881 to 1885 Wiske served as chorus master for Theodore Thomas. He prepared the choirs for the choral symphony concerts given by Thomas and his orchestra, including a chorus of 3,000 singer for the 1882 New York May Festival. He also prepared numerous choirs for the many Wagner Festivals held across the United States in 1884.

In 1885 Wiske became the organist at Ross Street Presbyterian Church. By 1886 he was conductor of a men's chorus, the Orpheus Glee Club, and a women's chorus, Caecilia Ladies Vocal Society (CLVS), in addition to leading the AMS. In 1887 a venue for his musical groups, the Amphion Academy (later the Amphion Theatre), was constructed. He continued to conduct the CLVS and the AMS until 1891 when he was succeeded by W. H. Neidlinger. By 1889 he was conducting the Brooklyn Choral Society. He was also the conductor of the Euterpe Society, a Brooklyn-based musical group of mixed amateurs and professionals that encompassed an all-male chorus and a mixed-gender orchestra. He led this organization in a performance of George Frederick Bristow's The Great Republic at the Lenox Lyceum on February 23, 1891. He was still conducting this organization as late as 1897.

Wiske was a supporter of American composers at a time when American-made music was not widely supported. On April 15, 1891, he conducted the world premieres of Bruno Klein's Concert Piece for Piano and Orhestra and Henry Holden Huss's Nuptial March in a concert sponsored by the Manuscript Society of New York at Chickering Hall. Earlier that year he gave a concert of all American music at the BAM featuring numerous composers mainly from Brooklyn. It was heavily criticized by influential critic Henry Edward Krehbiel. On the program was Ellsworth C. Phelps's Emancipation, Dudley Buck's Romanza for Four Horns and Orchestra, and Concerto for Violin by Harry Rowe Shelley that was played by Maud Powell among other works. Krehbiel's negative review led Phelps to write a defense of the concert in the Brooklyn Daily Eagle.

Wiske conducted the first performance in New York of Arthur Sullivan's The Golden Legend at the Lenox Lyceum on December 4, 1891, with New York's Schubert Club and Chorus Society. On December 21, 1897, he conducted the Society of Musical Arts in the first performance in the United States of Pietro Mascagni's ballet Zanetto in the ballroom of the Waldorf-Astoria hotel, a work presented in conjunction with Jules Massenet's oratorio Ève. Wiske had previously conducted the first performance in New York City of Ève at the Lenox Lyceum on February 5, 1891, with Anna Mooney Burch singing the title role.

== Later life and career in New Jersey and Woodstock ==
In 1893 Wiske left his post at Hanson Place Baptist Church in Brooklyn to take a position as organist and choirmaster of a Baptist church in Passaic, New Jersey. He moved to Paterson, New Jersey, in 1896 where he served as organist and choirmaster of several different churches. He led numerous oratorio performances in New Jersey. In 1902 he was appointed conductor of the Patterson Music Festival in New Jersey. In 1915 he founded the Newark Music Festival (NMF), an annual event usually held at the First Regiment Armory which lasted until 1930. The festival was a major event in the city, boasting large choirs of up to 3000 singers and audiences of up to 40,000 people. In 1920 he conducted the premiere of Harry Reginald Spier's A Hymn to America, a work for symphony, chorus, and baritone, at the NMF with Reinald Werrenrath as the featured soloist. He retired after the 1930 festival in New Wark.

In 1904 Wiske and his wife Frances built Lake Christopher Lodge in Woodstock, New York. Wiske spent his time living there when not conducting for the NMF. They expanded the property into an inn. It opened as the Birch Villa Inn in 1921 and held a music camp as well as catering to summer vacationers.

Wiske died at the age of 81 at Central Maine General Hospital on July 9, 1934, in Lewiston, Maine. His death was preceded by a fall at his home in Woodstock in which he broke his hip. The Historical Society of Woodstock's museum at Bryant Pond has a large picture framed by Wiske in its collection.
