= Manuscript Society of New York =

American music organization (1889–1918)

The Manuscript Society of New York, sometimes referred to as The Manuscript Society, was an organization in New York City devoted to performing new music by American composers. It was founded in 1889. It presented concerts of mostly unpublished music by American composers until it disbanded in 1918.

== History ==
The Manuscript Society of New York (MSNY) held its first meeting on October 17, 1889. It was founded by four composers; three of whom served as the MSNY's first officers: Gerrit Smith (president), Louis Raphael Dressler (secretary), and C. B. Hawley (treasurer). The purpose of the group was to perform new unpublished music in concerts in order to receive critical input from peers. This aided its composer members in the revision process prior to publication, and provided composers with an opportunity to workshop material. Despite its workshop intentions, the 1890-1891 public concerts of the MSNY were covered widely in the American press. The group also gave private performances.

By January 1890 the MSNY had 25 members. Member composers in 1890 included Nathan H. Allen, Frederick Arthur Bridgman, Laura Sedgwick Collins, Frank G. Dossert, Victor Harris, Henry Holden Huss, Bruno Klein, Clara Anna Korn, Sebastian Bach Mills, W. H. Neidlinger, Silas G. Pratt, Wenzel Raboch, Sumner Salter, Frank N. Shepperd, Frank Treat Southwick, Richard Henry Warren, and Mary Knight Wood. In 1893 the American Composers' Choral Association (founded by Emilio Agramonte y Piña) was subsumed into the MSNY. The MSNY was notable for providing opportunities for women composers at a time when opportunities were rarely available elsewhere. Some active women members (in addition to those mentioned earlier) included Vivian Burnett, Eleanor Everest Freer, Grace G. Gardner, Margaret Ruthven Lang, and Bertha Remick.

The initial success of the MSNY led to the founding of two sister organizations: the Manuscript Society of Chicago (1891-1900) and the Manuscript Society of Philadelphia (1892-1936). During the 1890s and into the early 20th century the MSNY presented two annual orchestral concerts and one annual concert of chamber music at Chickering Hall. Henry Kimball Hadley's first symphony, Youth and Life, was premiered at an MSNY concert in 1897, and was later programmed by the New York Philharmonic for a 1921 performance at Carnegie Hall.

The MSNY worked to assist American composers in obtaining control over the selection and performances of their creations. In 1896 the organization lobbied the United States Congress to protect the international copyrights of composers. Edward MacDowell served as the MSNY's president in 1899–1900. MacDowell was critical of the overall quality of the music being put forward by the MSNY, and unsuccessfully attempted to change the organization into one that allowed European composers of high standing to join and participate This led to infighting in the group which damaged the organization, and after 1901 its activities were reduced as a result. It continued to operate to a lesser degree until disbanding in 1918. One of its last concerts was a performance of Arthur Farwell's Christmas masque The Evergreen Tree in December 1917. Other presidents of the MSNY included Franz Xavier Arens, Frank Damrosch, and Frank L. Sealy.

== Partial list of members ==
- Nathan H. Allen
- Franz Xavier Arens
- Tomijiro Asai
- Homer Newton Bartlett
- Frederick Arthur Bridgman
- Vivian Burnett
- Dudley Buck
- Charles Wakefield Cadman
- John Spencer Camp
- Laura Sedgwick Collins
- Lucien G. Chaffin
- W. Ralph Cox
- Frank Damrosch
- Reginald De Koven
- Frank G. Dossert
- Louis Raphael Dressler
- James P. Dunn
- J. Remington Fairlamb
- Edward Baxter Felton
- Eleanor Everest Freer
- Grace G. Gardner
- Alfred John Goodrich
- Victor Harris
- C. B. Hawley
- John Adam Hugo
- Henry Holden Huss
- Edgar Stillman Kelley
- Bruno Klein
- Clara Anna Korn
- Edward Kilenyi Sr.,
- Carl Lachmund
- Margaret Ruthven Lang,
- Ernest Lent,
- Wassili Leps,
- Eduardo Marzo
- Edward G. McCollin,
- Sebastian Bach Mills
- W. H. Neidlinger
- Smith Newell Penfield,
- Silas G. Pratt
- Wenzel Raboch
- Bertha Remick
- Wallingford Riegger
- Alexander Russell,
- Sumner Salter
- Peter August Schnecker
- John Prindle Scott
- Frank L. Sealy
- Frank N. Shepperd
- Gerrit Smith
- Hobart Smock
- Frank Treat Southwick,
- S. Reid Spencer
- Carl Venth
- Claude Warford
- Richard Henry Warren
- Mary Knight Wood
