= Frank T. Southwick =

American composer and organist

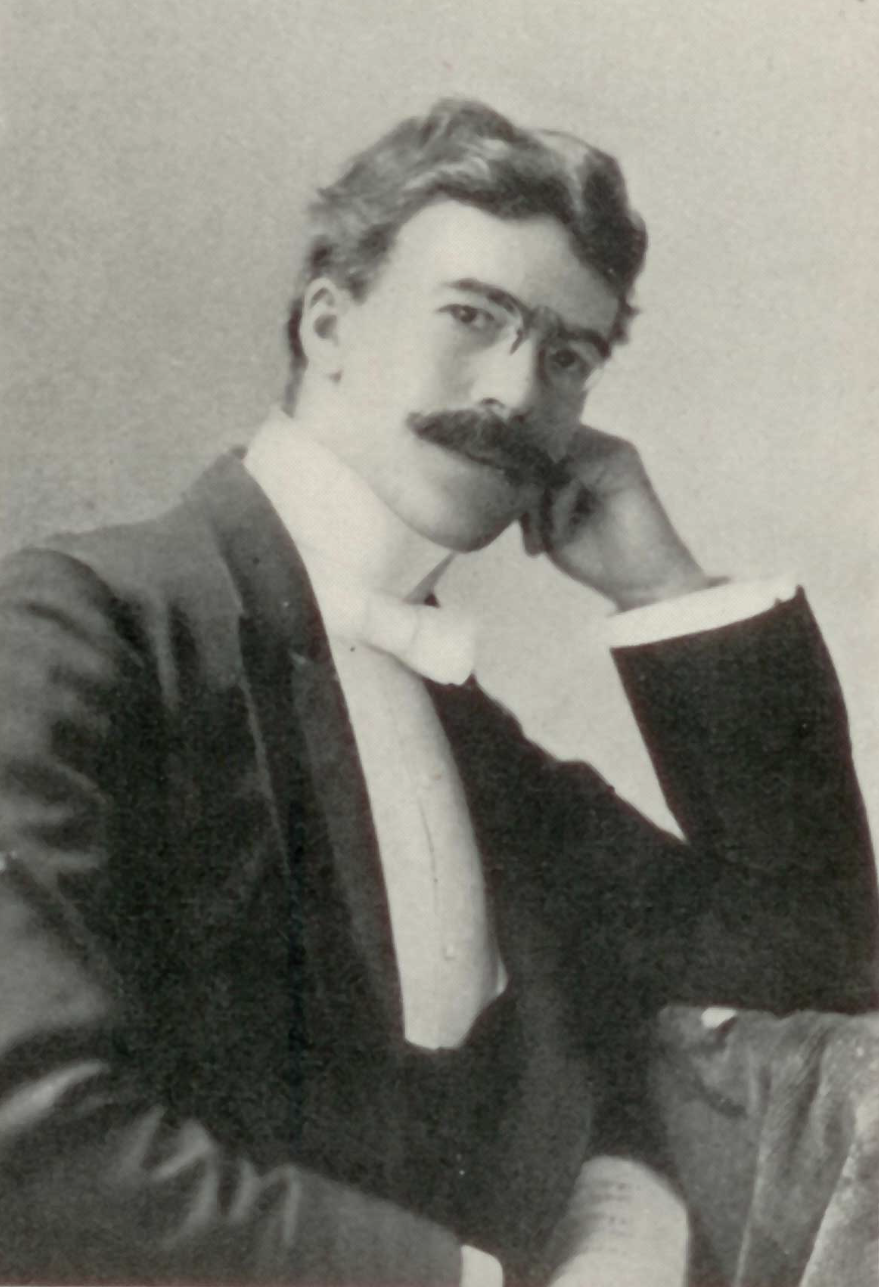
Frank Treat Southwick

Frank Treat Southwick (17 October 1857 – 24 February 1948) was an American composer, organist, pianist, and music educator. Born in Cromwell, Connecticut, he lived much of his life in Meriden, Connecticut where he began his career as an organist at the age of 15. After training as an organist at the Boston Conservatory and the Cincinnati Conservatory of Music he held a series of organist posts first in Connecticut and then in New York City. He was a founding member of both the Manuscript Society of New York and the American Guild of Organists. He ended his career as an organist at First Methodist Church in Meriden. He was also active as a music teacher until his retirement in c. 1938. His compositional output included hymns, anthems, piano and organ music, and songs.

== Early life and career ==
Frank Treat Southwick was born on 17 October 1857 in Cromwell, Connecticut. His father, Daniel Franklin Southwick, relocated the Southwick family to Meriden, Connecticut in 1861 where he operated a shoe store. A talented musician at a young age, Frank was appointed organist at First Baptist Church in Meriden at the age of 15. Prior to 1879 he studied organ with Whitney Eugene Thayer at the Boston Conservatory. In 1879 he pursued further studies at the Cincinnati Conservatory of Music. There he impressed Theodore Thomas with his playing, and was invited to appear as an organist in one of Thomas's concerts.

In August 1879 Southwick was appointed temporary organist at St. Andrew's Episcopal Church in Meriden while the church's regular organist, H. A. Foster, was traveling. After this he worked as a teacher of organ and piano in Meriden in the early 1880s. He simultaneously served as organist at Christ Church Cathedral in Hartford until he was appointed organist at Church of the Holy Trinity, Middletown in April 1882. In January 1881 he worked as a pianist with the Philharmonic Club of New York for performances at a music convention held in Meriden. In January 1883 he served as pianist for a production of Gilbert and Sullivan's Patience staged at the Church of the Messiah in New York City.

== New York City musician and marriages ==
In early 1886 Southwick was appointed organist and choirmaster at the Episcopal Church of the Holy Trinity (ECHT) in New York City at Fifth Avenue and 125th Street; a position he maintained until March 1893 when the church decided it could no longer afford his high salary. He subsequently worked as organist at St. Andrew's Methodist Episcopal Church on 76th St from 1893 to 1904. While working in New York as an organist, he concurrently taught music lessons privately in both New York City and in Meriden. He also continued his own musical education through further studies in NYC with Theodore Thomas, Otto Singer, and George E. Whiting.

In March 1886 Southwick married Emma G. Greenleaf in New York City; a marriage which tragically ended with Greenleaf's sudden and unexpected death just two months later. In 1895 he married his second wife, Emma Lewis Thomson. They remained married until Emma's death in 1945. They had one son, the organist Laurence F. Southwick.

In 1887 Southwick served as musical director and pianist of the Longfellow Concert Company with whom he toured. He was accompanist for the Brooklyn Choral Society in its May 1888 concert. From 1888 to 1890 he performed in concerts with Laura Sedgwick Collins as a member of the Ideal Concert Company of New York. In 1889 he was a founding member of the Manuscript Society of New York. In 1890 he gave a recital to inaugurate the newly constructed organ at East Pearl Street United Methodist Church in New Haven. He was a founding member of the American Guild of Organists in 1896.

== Later life and career ==
In April 1904 Southwick was appointed organist and choirmaster at First Presbyterian Church (FPC) in Englewood, New Jersey. He served as music director of Englewood Choral Society for the 1907-1908 season. He remained in Englewood until May 1908 when he assumed the post of organist at Congregational Church in Greenwich, Connecticut. He remained in that position until 1909 when he was appointed organist and choirmaster at First Methodist Church in Meriden. He was still in this position as late as 1925.

In 1916 he was appointed organist at the Fox Theater in New Britain, Connecticut where he accompanied silent films. That same year he was a guest speaker at Princeton University where he guest lectured on plainsong and early Western Christian hymns. His serenade-march "Albarado" was published by White, Smith & Company in 1920; a work the Musical America critic reviewed as "picturesque and playable". He retired from teaching in c. 1938.

Southwick died on 24 February 1948 in Meriden, Connecticut.

== Partial list of compositions ==
=== Choral works ===
- "Magnificat"
- "Nunc dimittis"
- "Awake My Heart", anthem for SATB choir and quartet of soloists
- "Virgin Ever, Virgin Blest", SATB choir and soprano soloist

=== Hymns ===
- "Ever looking upward, as a trusting child"
- "Hark! the joyful Christmas greeting"
- "O lift your heads, ye heavenly gates"
- "Rejoice today with glad accord"
- "Strains of music often greet us"
- "Wake! and tune your youthful voices"

=== Piano music ===
- Valse Sappho (1890, Oliver Ditson and Company; a collection of waltzes by Southwick)

=== Songs ===
- "Ask Me No More" (1885)
- "At Night" (1888)
- "Echoes" (1889)
- "The Spanish Student" (1889)
- "A Nocturne"
- "Remember"
- "Too Late"
