= Mary Knight Wood =

American classical composer

Mary Knight Wood Mason (17 April 1857 – 20 December 1944) was an American pianist, music educator, and composer.

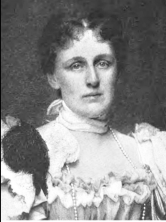
Mary Knight Wood

She was born in Easthampton, Massachusetts, the daughter of Lieutenant-governor, manufacturer and philanthropist Horatio G. Knight and Mary Ann Huntoon Knight. She attended Miss Porter's School in Farmington, Connecticut, where she studied music with Karl Klauser. She continued her education at the Charlier Institute in New York, and then went to Boston to study under Benjamin Johnson Lang. She had further studies in New York under Albert Ross Parsons, John Henry Cornell, and Henry Holden Huss.

Knight married Charles Greenleaf Wood of Boston in 1879. Her husband was a merchant and officer for the John Hancock Life Insurance Company. They lived in Boston until 1885, when they returned to Easthampton and soon settled into high society in New York City, living in an apartment in Washington Square. She became an early member of the Manuscript Society of New York, and saw several of her compositions performed during their concerts. She began summering in Onteora Park, where in 1890 she met Mark Twain. In 1891 the Woods built a summer cottage named "Witchwood" at Onteora Park; this cottage would be the setting for many salon-style artistic gatherings in the ensuing decades. Her summer neighbors in Onteora Park included Will Carleton, Ripley Hitchcock, Carroll Beckwith (who referred to her in his diaries by the nickname Minna), Eastman Johnson, Dora Wheeler, Dagmar Rybner, and Candace Wheeler. Beckwith painted her portrait in 1908, which was given the place of honor at the Century Club's 1909 exhibition.

Two of her songs were performed at the Women's Musical Congress at the 1893 Columbian Exposition.

Her husband Charles Wood died in New York in 1913. The following year she married widower Alfred Bishop Mason of New York, a lawyer, author, and former railroad industrialist in Mexico. She became active in suffragist causes, joining the Equal Franchise Society and the Women's Cosmopolitan Club. Mason and Knight sold Witchwood and their New York apartment in the early 1920s and retired in Florence. Alfred Mason died there in 1933, and Mary died there in 1944. She is buried in Florence's Cimitero Accatolico (the English Cemetery).

== Works ==
Wood published about fifty songs. Selected works include:

- Afterward
- A Romance (with violin obbligato, words by W. A. Purrington)
- Ashes of Roses (Words by Elaine Goodale Eastman)
- An Old Song (A Song of Solomon) (setting of Henry Cuyler Bunner's poem Old Song)
- A Song of Tangier (Words by Grace Clark Newton)
- At Dawn (with cello obbligato)
- Autumn (with violin obbligato)
- Dodelinette
- Don't Cry
- Heart's Ease
- Love Blows As The Wind Blows (sometimes listed as Love Blows Into the Heart, setting of an untitled William Ernest Henley poem)
- Love's Missing Bow (with cello obbligato)
- Love Song of Egypt
- On Land Or Sea (words by C. H. Goldthwaite)
- Piano Trio
- Prayer For Sleep
- Serenade
- Song of Joy
- Songs of Sleep
- Thou (words by Richard Watson Gilder)
- Thy Name
- To My Lady
- Waiting

Her music has been recorded and issued on CD, including:

- Women at an Exposition: Music Composed by Women and Performed at the 1893 World's Fair in Chicago Audio CD (July 27, 1993) Koch Int'l Classics, ASIN: B000001SH8
