= Edward Fisher (musician) =

Canadian conductor, teacher, organist and musical director

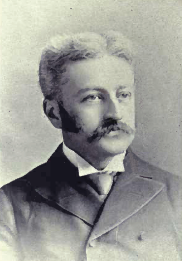
- Born: 11 January 1848; Jamaica, Vermont
- Died: 31 May 1913 (aged 65); Toronto, Ontario
- Known for: Founder and first musical director of the Toronto Conservatory of Music

Edward Fisher (11 January 1848 – 31 May 1913) was a Canadian conductor, teacher, organist, and founder and first musical director of the Toronto Conservatory of Music.

Born in Jamaica, Vermont, he studied at the Boston Conservatory of Music in 1867. His teachers included Julius Eichberg, Joseph Bennett Sharland, and Whitney Eugene Thayer. He later studied in Berlin, Germany with Carl August Haupt and Carl Albert Loeschhorn. In 1875, he moved to Ottawa, Ontario, Canada, becoming music director of the Ottawa Ladies' College and conducted the Ottawa Choral Society. Fisher moved to Toronto, Ontario, where he was an organist at St Andrew’s Presbyterian Church from 1879 to 1899. He was also a music director of the Ontario Ladies’ College in Whitby, Ontario. In 1886, he started the Toronto Conservatory of Music and was appointed musical director.

He died in Toronto on 31 May 1913 and was succeeded by Augustus Stephen Vogt.
