= Gerrit Smith (composer) =

American composer, organist, and educator (1859-1912)

Gerrit Smith (December 11, 1859 – July 21, 1912) was an American composer, organist, and educator. Born in Maryland and raised in Geneva, New York, he studied at Hobart College and the Stuttgart Conservatory as well as privately with significant musicians in America and Europe. His first organist posts were in Buffalo, New York at St. Paul's Cathedral (1879-1880) and Lafayette Street Church (1880-1881). He was organist at St. Peter's Episcopal Church in Albany, New York from 1882 until 1885 when he became organist of South Reformed Dutch Church in New York City. He remained at this latter church until his death in 1912.

In addition to his church work, Smith taught on the faculties of the Master School of Music in Brooklyn and Union Theological Seminary. In 1889, he co-founded the Manuscript Society of New York, and was elected its first president. In 1896, he was a founding member of the American Guild of Organists, and also served a term as president of that organization.

== Life and career ==
The son of Gerrit H. Smith, Gerrit Smith was born in Hagerstown, Maryland on December 11, 1859. He grew up in Geneva, New York where he received his first musical instruction as a choir boy. He studied organ with Adolph Baumbach in his youth. He was educated at Hobart College in New York; graduating in 1876. While a student there he spent two years as the school's chapel organist. He then went to Germany to study at the Stuttgart Conservatory where he was a pupil of Christian Fink. Upon returning to the United States in 1877, he pursued further music studies in New York City with Samuel Prowse Warren, William Hall Sherwood, and Whitney Eugene Thayer.

In January 1879, Smith was appointed organist at St. Paul's Cathedral in Buffalo, New York. He remained there until May 1880. In December 1880 he was appointed organist of Lafayette Street Church in Buffalo. He remained there until early May 1881 when he left Buffalo to travel back to Europe to pursue further music studies. He went to Berlin where was a pupil of Carl August Haupt, Eduard Rohde, August Gottfried Ritter, and Gustav Merkel. He returned to New York in January 1882. He later went to London in 1901 to pursue further studies in music composition with Hamish MacCunn and Edward German; after which he spent a month staying in the home of Edvard Grieg in Norway.

In 1882 Smith became organist at St. Peter's Episcopal Church in Albany, New York. From 1885 until his death in 1912 Smith was organist at South Reformed Dutch Church at Park Avenue and 85th St in New York City. He co-founded the Manuscript Society of New York (MSNY); an organization which had its first meeting on October 17, 1889. He was the MSNY's first president. In 1896 he was a founding member of the American Guild of Organists (AGO) and served as its first warden. He also served a term as president of the AGO.

Smith taught music theory at the Master School of Music in Brooklyn. At the time of his death he was director of the music program at Union Theological Seminary. His compositional output included both sacred and secular music. He wrote the cantata King David, a setting of the Te Deum, anthems, carols, part-songs, choral music, and more than 50 art songs. He wrote the music to the hymn "When Christ Was Born of Mary Free".

Smith died in New York City on July 21, 1912.
