= Helen Huss Parkhurst =

American philosopher (1887–1959)

- Born: January 3, 1887; New York City, U.S.
- Died: April 14, 1959 (aged 72); New York City, U.S.
- Occupation: Philosopher
- Relatives: Henry Holden Huss (uncle)

Academic background
- Education: Bryn Mawr College; University of Cambridge; University of Paris; Johns Hopkins University

Academic work
- Discipline: Aesthetics
- Sub-discipline: Philosophy of architecture
- Institutions: Barnard College

Helen Huss Parkhurst (January 3, 1887 – April 14, 1959) was an American philosopher of art who published two aesthetics books, Beauty: An Interpretation of Art and the Imaginative Life (1930) and Cathedral: A Gothic Pilgrimage (1936). She was a professor at Barnard College for decades.

== Biography ==
Helen Huss Parkhurst was born in New York City on January 3, 1887. She was one of the five children of Mary Sophie (née Huss) and Howard Elmore Parkhurst, the former of whom was the older sister of composer Henry Holden Huss. She studied at Dwight-Englewood School in nearby Englewood, New Jersey, and she graduated as part of the Class of 1905. After receiving her AB and MA at Bryn Mawr College, she continued her studies abroad at the University of Cambridge (where Bryn Mawr invited her to be a visiting fellow) and University of Paris (1913–1914), before returning to the United States to study at Johns Hopkins University (1915–1916). Afterwards, she returned to Bryn Mawr in 1916 as a lecturer in art history before receiving her PhD in 1917. That same year, she moved to Barnard College and worked as an Assistant in Philosophy, before receiving several promotions: instructor in 1918, assistant professor in 1924, associate professor in 1931, full professor in 1944, and eventually professor emeritus.

As an academic, she specialized in aesthetics. In 1930, she published the book Beauty: An Interpretation of Art and the Imaginative Life. In 1931, she was appointed a Guggenheim Fellow for the purposes of travelling to study the philosophy of architecture; during said travels, she visited Southeast Asia where she personally observed the Angkor Wat and Borobudur. In 1936, she published another aesthetics book, Cathedral: A Gothic Pilgrimage.

Parkhurst died on April 14, 1959 in New York City.

== Publications ==
- Beauty: An Interpretation of Art and the Imaginative Life (1930)
- Cathedral: A Gothic Pilgrimage (1936)
