= Raymond Kendall (musicologist) =

American musicologist and academic

Raymond Kendall (1910–1980) was an American musicologist and academic. After earning a Ph.D. in musicology from Cornell University in 1940, he became an assistant professor at Dartmouth College. He left that post in 1943 to work for the United States Armed Forces as a music coordinator and consultant. In fall of 1945, he joined the music faculty of the University of Michigan. He resigned from that position to assume the role of the Dean of the Music Department at the University of Southern California (USC). He continued in that post for 20 years. He also served as the President of the Music Teachers National Association during the late 1940s. After leaving USC, he served for many years as the President of the Performing Arts Council at the Los Angeles Music Center.
