= Clara Anna Korn =

Pianist and composer

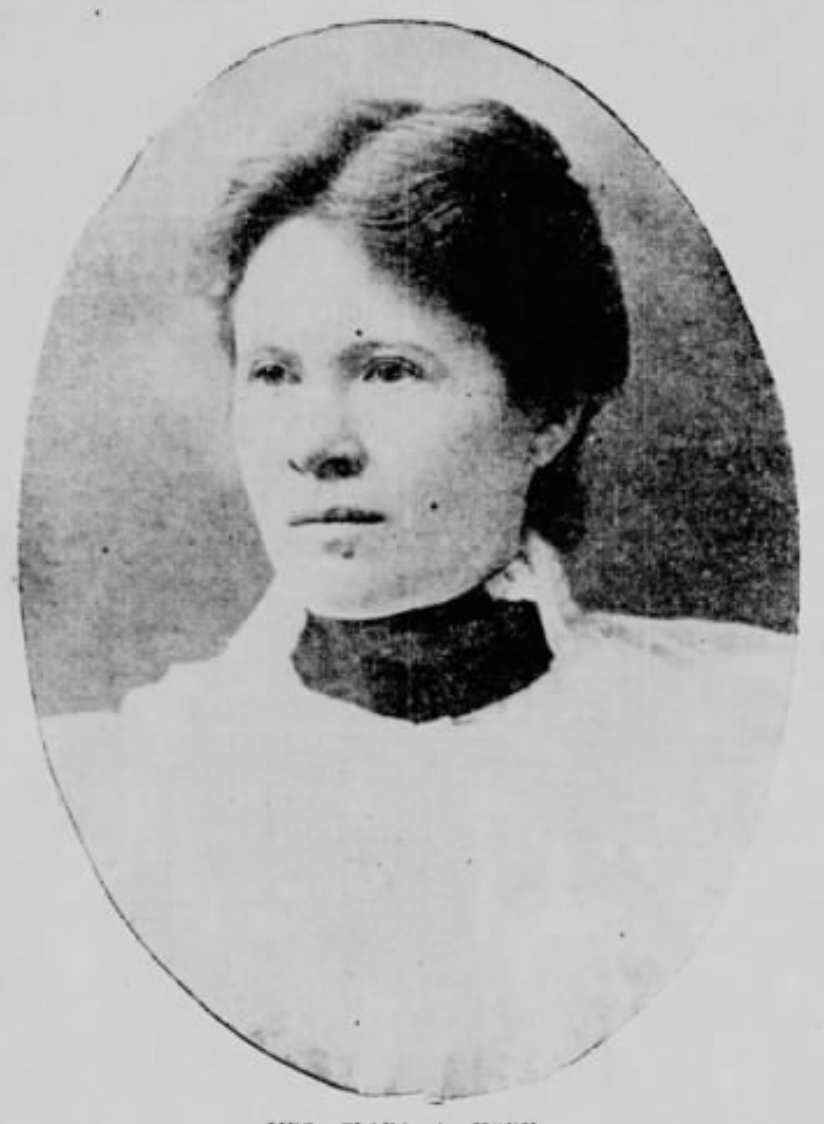
Korn in 1897

Clara Anna Korn (née Gerlach, January 30, 1866–July 14, 1940) was an American pianist, composer, and music writer. She sometimes wrote under a pseudonym, C. Gerhard.

She was born in Germany, and moved to New Jersey with her family at the age of 3. She graduated from Jersey City High School in 1881. She initially embarked on a career as a concert pianist, and had early studies with William G. Vogt. When Tchaikovsky was in New York in 1891 he had read some of her composition manuscripts (probably when he was visiting with Schirmer), and sent her a letter of encouragement. She then pivoted towards composition, entering the National Conservatory of Music in New York, where she studied under Bruno Oscar Klein and Horatio Parker and was listed as an "unofficial" composition student of Antonín Dvořák.

After graduation from the National Conservatory, she taught there from 1893 to 1898. She also taught in New Jersey public schools, and was head of the piano department at the DeBauer School of Music and Languages in New York City.

Korn contributed articles to several music journals and helped to found the Women's Philharmonic Orchestra, the National Federation of Music Clubs, and the Manuscript Society of New York.

== Works ==
Korn composed for voice, piano and orchestra. Few of her compositions were published. Selected works include:

- Capriccio for piano and orchestra
- Suite of Modern Dances, op. 10 for violin and piano
- Violin concerto
- Morpheus, symphonic poem
- Orchestra suite No. 1, "Ancient Dances"
- Orchestra suite No. 2, "Rural Snapshots"
- Piano Concerto
- Piano Sonata, op. 14 "Nautical"
- Violin sonata
- Gymnasium March
- Swinging
- An Album of 9 Songs (for Soprano or Tenor), consisting of
  1. Little Fellow, lyrics by Frank Lebby Stanton
  2. The Miller's Daughter, words by Tennyson
  3. Farewell, words by Tennyson
  4. Legend, words by Whittier
  5. A recollection, words by Tennyson
  6. The Brook, words by Tennyson
  7. Cease, words by Felicia Hemans
  8. Love Song, words by James Russell Lowell
  9. My Fair One
- The Land The People Own, song
- Their Last War opera written in 1930 and published in 1932 as a play
- 2-piano arrangement of Tchaikovsky's 1812 Overture

Books/Methods:

- Korn's One Lesson: A New and Greatly Simplified System of Note Reading
