= Eduardo Marzo =

Eduardo Marzo (November 29, 1852 – June 7, 1929) was an Italian-American organist, music teacher, and composer. A composer of sacred and secular music, he served as organist at several New York City churches and was also a music educator.

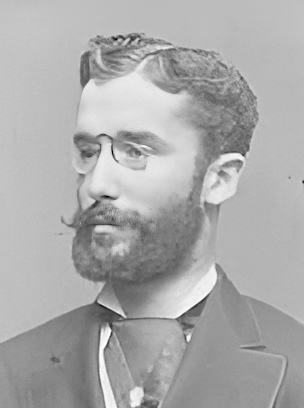
Eduardo Marzo (1852–1929) Italian Catholic composer

== Early life and education ==
Marzo was born in Naples, Italy on November 29, 1852, the son of Carlo Marzo, a journalist and author, and Angiola Bertolè-Viale. He first came to New York in 1867 as a boy pianist but returned to Italy to complete his studies. He studied with Guglielmo Nacciarone and Giorgio Miceli in Naples, and later completed his composition studies under Salvatore Pappalardo.

== Career ==
Marzo permanently settled in the United States in 1869. For several years, he toured the country as a musical director of opera troupes and concert companies. He served as accompanist for a number of notable artists of the era, including Carlotta Patti, Giuseppe Mario, Tom Karle, Giorgio Ronconi, Ernest de Munck, Gaetano Braga, Louise Carey, Émile Sauret, and Pablo Sarasate.

In 1878 he established himself in New York City. Throughout his career, he held organist positions at several New York churches, including St. Agnes, All Saints', St. Vincent Ferrer, the Church of the Holy Name, and at the time of his death, the Church of the Holy Spirit in the Bronx.

== Compositions and publications ==
Marzo was a composer whose works included:

- Fifteen masses
- Four vespers
- Over forty songs for Catholic services
- Anthems and songs for Protestant churches
- Orchestral preludes
- Piano pieces
- Secular songs and duets
- Operettas and cantatas for children's voices

He compiled several collections including:

- Songs of Italy (1904)
- Neapolitan Songs (1905)
- Dance Songs of the Nations (1908)
- Fifty Christmas Carols of all Nations (1923)
- Children's Carols (1925)
- Sixty Carols of all Nations (1928)

His pedagogical works included The Art of Vocalization (18 volumes, 1906) and Preparatory Course to the Art of Vocalization (1908). His collected works were published in twenty volumes (1870–1917).

== Honors and recognition ==
Marzo received several prestigious honors:

- Knight of the Order of the Crown of Italy, conferred by King Umberto I in 1884
- Member of Royal Academy of St. Cecilia, Rome (1894)
- Knight of the Order of St. Sylvester, conferred by Pope Benedict XV in 1914

During World War I, he was recognized by the King of Italy for "maintaining the musical standards in this country and Italy for his aid in war relief work". On November 7, 1917, he was honored with a banquet at the Waldorf-Astoria Hotel commemorating his fifty years of musical activity in the United States.

== Personal life ==
In 1882 Marzo married Clara L. Philbin, daughter of Eugene A. Philbin and sister of New York Supreme court Justice Eugene Ambrose Philbin. The couple had four children: Clarence Philbin, Alberto Steven (1885–1983), Maria Josephine, and Rita Elise.

From 1901 until the late 1920s, the family resided at 139 West 87th Street in Manhattan, in a Queen Anne/Romanesque Revival style house. The Marzos were members of the Verdi Club, the only musical organization in the United States dedicated specifically to the works of Giuseppe Verdi.

Marzo died on June 7, 1929, at his home at 1875 University Avenue in the Bronx, New York, at the age of 77.
