= William Dressler (musician) =

English-born composer and arranger (1826–1914)

William Dressler (1826 – July 2, 1914) was a music composer and arranger.

== Early life and education ==
Dressler was born in Nottingham, England in 1826. His father was a court flutist for the King of Saxony.

In 1847, Dressler graduated from the Cologne Conservatory of Music. After that, Dressler was the first violinist and later conductor of the Opera House in Wiesbaden.

== Career in the U.S. ==
In the early 1850s, Dressler came to the United States. He was a solo pianist and accompanist to the Norwegian violist Ole Bull. He traveled with concert companies before settling in New York. In New York, Dressler worked at churches, taught music and composed music. He was one of New York's best known composers and compiled a glee and chorus book titled Ne Plus Ultra.

Dresller played both piano and mouth organ, and also accompanied Ole Bull. He also led the Hanover Conservatory in Germany.

Dressler was the musical editor for the publishing house William Hall & Son & J. L. Peters for a time.

== Personal life and death ==
William Dressler married May Hyde and had three children, who all became musicians. His son, Louis Raphael Dressler, born in 1861 also became a musician.

William Dressler died on July 2, 1914, in New York City. He is buried in Green-Wood Cemetery in Brooklyn, New York.

== Work ==
- "Star Spangled Banner", piano arrangement (1861)
- "The Girl I Left Behind Me"
- "Night in Venice"
- "Nell Gwynne" (an opera arranged by Dressler, related to Nell Gwyn)
- "Castle Garden Schottisch"
- "Reindeer Polka"
- Summer Evenings an arrangement of 22 songs
- Spring Mornings
- Dawn of the Day
