= James Hotchkiss Rogers =

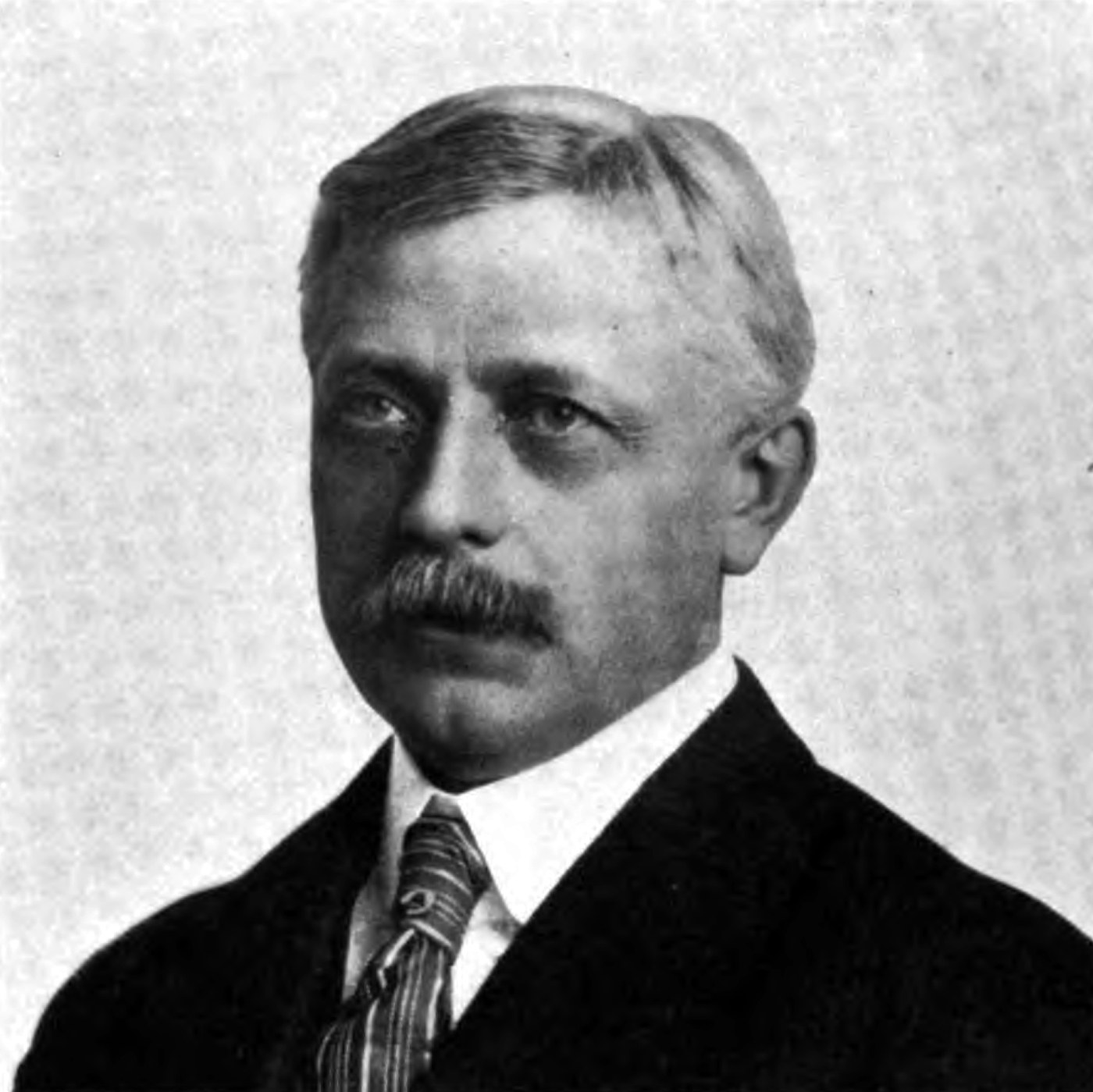

Background information
- Born: February 7, 1857; Fair Haven, Connecticut
- Died: November 28, 1940 (aged 83) Pasadena, California
- Genres: Classical
- Occupations: Composer, teacher, critic, publisher
- Instrument: Organ

James Hotchkiss Rogers (February 7, 1857 – November 28, 1940) was an American organist, composer, teacher, music critic, and publisher.

== Biography ==
James was born in Fair Haven, Connecticut, the son of Martin L. and Harriett Hotchkiss Rogers in Fair Haven, Connecticut, descended from a family of "old New England stock". He began studying piano by the age of twelve and organ with Clarence Eddy in Chicago. At the age of eighteen he went to Berlin, Germany, where he studied for two years with Carl August Haupt and Rohde, followed by two years in Paris, France, where he studied with Alexandre Guilmant, Henri Fissot, and Charles-Marie Widor. He worked for a year in Burlington, Iowa before moving to Cleveland, Ohio, where he established himself primarily as an organist. Rogers married Alice Abigail Hall on 20 October 1891 and had two children, Stewart and Marian.

In addition to his organist positions at the Euclid Avenue Temple (a position he held for 50 years), he taught at the Cleveland School of Music and served as a critic for the Cleveland Plain Dealer. He was not a harsh critic: even when Isadora Duncan danced in an outrageous red costume in 1922, Rogers simply wrote, "all things considered, the orchestra did very well." Rogers explained his role was not to discourage but rather to encourage and advise. He also published some of his own music and those of others.

Upon his retirement from the Cleveland School of Music, he was honoured by 500 musicians and friends at a farewell dinner. He moved to Pasadena, California, where he died. He was buried in Lake View Cemetery.

In 1946, the Cleveland Orchestra dedicated a program to music by Rogers. A portrait, painted by Mary Seymour Brooks, was presented to the Western Reserve Historical Society a year later.

== Music ==
Rodgers was a prolific composer, writing about 550 works. He composed organ works, church music, and over 130 art songs.

He also composed lighter secular partsongs, Christmas and Easter cantatas, several Mass settings, and temple service music.

Rogers also published several pedagogical volumes for the piano, and he edited and published several volumes of organ pieces from a variety of sources.
