= C. B. Hawley =

American voice teacher, organist and composer

Charles Beach Hawley (Brookfield, Connecticut, February 14, 1858 – Eatontown, New Jersey, December 29, 1915) was an American bass, voice teacher, organist and composer of art songs and other vocal works.

C. B. Hawley

== Biography ==
Charles Beach was born to John N. and Clarissa W. Keeler Hawley in Brookfield, Connecticut. Charles and his father were descendants of the pioneer founders of Newtown, which later became part of Brookfield. For many years, his father was the organist at St. Paul's Church in Brookfield.

As a young man he attended the Cheshire Military School, where he "took prominent part in all the musical activities of the school". In 1875, he moved to New York City, where he studied singing with George J. Webb, P.A. Rivarde, and Gustave Federlein, and composition with Dudley Buck. He soon began singing at Calvary Episcopal Church, and later became an assistant organist at St. Thomas Church. He married Hattie B. Crane in 1889.

He established himself as a versatile musician in New York. He was bass singer and choir director at the Broadway Tabernacle for 17 years. He had a private studio as a voice teacher and ran The Metropolitan College of Music for 10 years. He was a Charter Member of the Manuscript Society of New York and was an active member of the Mendelssohn Glee Club. Later organist and choir director positions were at the Madison Avenue Methodist Episcopal Church and West End Presbyterian Church.

== Music ==
As a composer, C. B. Hawley concentrated on secular and sacred art songs, publishing at least 50 songs. He also composed a Christmas cantata, The Christ Child, esteemed in its day, and several part-songs for the Mendelssohn Glee Club.

His musical language is "simple and lyrical" at times, with more dramatic passages when indicated by the text. Songs such as "Noon and Night" and "The Sweetest Flower That Blows" are especially good for young or beginning singers. Most were published by G. Schirmer between 1895 and 1915.

At least one of his works remained in the repertoire after his death: the song "Because I Love You, Dear" was heard on a WABC radio broadcast on December 10, 1934, with Andre Kostelanetz conducting.

== Musical compositions ==
All published by G. Schirmer unless noted; texts are by the composer unless noted.

=== Larger works ===
- The Christ Child, Christmas cantata for SATB soloists, SATB choir and organ

=== Secular songs for voice and piano ===
- Ah! 'Tis a Dream, 1887
- (The) Arrow and the Song (Henry Wadsworth Longfellow), William A. Pond, 1893
- Because I Love You, Dear, 1894
- Bedouin Love Song
- For Love of Thee
- Greeting (Frank Lebby Stanton), 1898
- Hushaby, Sweet My Own (Eugene Field)
- I Love You So (Alice Dunbar), John Church publisher
- In April
- The Joy of Spring (Kate Chopin), John Church, 1913
- A June Madrigal
- Katherine's Curls
- Lady Mine
- (The) Land of Nod
- My Little Love, 1890
- (The) Nightingale and the Rose (R. H. Beck), 1898
- Noon and Night (Herbert Trench), John Church/T. Presser, 1905
- O Haste Thee, Sweet
- Once Again
- A Question (Richard Watson Gilder)
- Rainbows
- The Ring
- A Rose Fable
- A Song of Seasons
- (The) Song that my Heart is Singing
- Spring's Awakening
- (The) Sweetest Flower That Blows (Frederic Peterson), John Church publisher, 1898
- Sweetheart
- Three Songs with piano accompaniment, 1894
1. Good-Night (S. Weir Mitchell)
2. Unknown
3. Unknown
- Two Eyes of Brown
- When Life Hath Sorrow Found (Charles Swain), William A. Pond, 1894
- When Love is Gone, 1894
- Where Love Doth Build His Nest
- Woodland Love Song (Eunice Tietjens), John Church publisher, 1909

=== Sacred songs for voice and piano or organ ===
- Angels Roll the Rock Away (Easter Song)
- Breathe Your Soft Prayer to Christ the Child (anonymous text from The New York Sun newspaper), John Church publisher, 1910
- Calm on the listening ear of night (Christmas song), John Church publisher, 1905
- The Christ Child
- Come Unto Me, 1895
- I Heard the Voice of Jesus Say (D. Bonar), John Church publisher, 1910
- Oh, for a closer walk with God (W. Cowper), John Church publisher, 1913
- Redeeming Love
