= Eduard Rohde =

German composer and organist

Eduard Rohde (25 September 1828 – 25 March 1883) was a German composer and organist. Born in Halle, Germany in 1828, he was a pupil of August Gottfried Ritter, and later a choirmaster at the St. Georgenkirche and singing teacher at the Sophien-Gymnasium in Berlin. Rohde was also a royal music director. Eduard Rohde had a son named Eduard Rohde Jr. (2 May 1856 – 1931), also a composer, and died in Berlin in 1883. He wrote piano pieces, motets, part-songs, a sonata, instrumental and vocal works, as well as an elementary textbook for piano. His pupils include Arthur H. Bird, Edward Morris Bowman, and Gerrit Smith.

== Works ==
- Dance of the Dragonflies
- Album Leaf
- 6 Tonbuilder, Op. 50
- Fliegende Blätter, Op. 36
- Fugue in E minor
- Élégie in G minor
- Triolett, Op. 32
- Elfenreigen, Op. 111
- Volks-Lieder, Op. 137
- Zwiegesang, Op. 146, No. 2
- Sommerabend (op. 50)
- Der Blumen Rache (op. 141)
- Schildehorn (op. 128)
- V. sonata (op. 170)
