= Louis R. Dressler =

American organist and composer

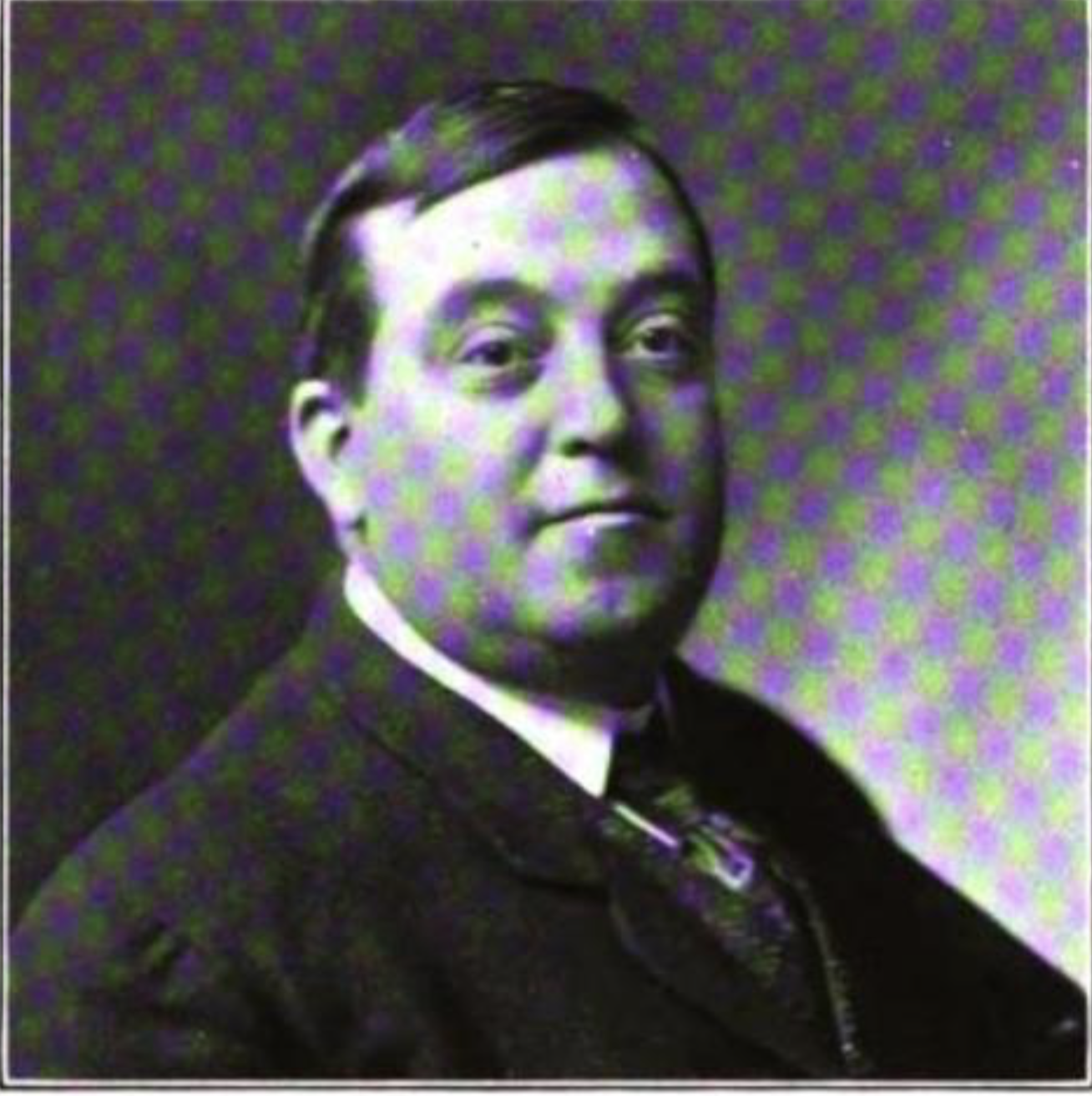
Louis R. Dressler

Louis Raphael Dressler (December 8, 1861 — November 8, 1932) was an American organist and composer.

== Life and career ==
The son of musician William Dressler and Mary Law Hyde, Louis Raphael Dressler was born in New York City on December 8, 1861. He studied music with his father and Silas G. Pratt. He began working as a church musician at the age of 15, and not long after was appointed organist at Fifth Avenue Baptist Church in New York City. In 1879 he was organist at St. Thomas' Church in Mamaroneck, New York.

On January 23, 1884, he married painter Jeannie Eloise Ayers. They had one son, and she died in 1907. At the time of his marriage he was organist at Hanson Place Baptist Church in Brooklyn. By December 1885 he was working as the organist at St. John's Episcopal Church in Jersey City, New Jersey. In 1904 Dressler became the substitute organist for Henry Kimball Hadley at Unitarian Church of All Souls in Manhattan, and subsequently was appointed to the post in 1905. He remained in that position for sixteen years.

In 1889 Dressler was a founding member of the Manuscript Society of New York, and served as the organization's first secretary. In 1897 he was awarded an honorary doctorate of music from Hope College.

Dressler died of a heart attack at the age of 71 on November 8, 1932, at his home in Jersey City, New Jersey. At the time of his death he was the head of the religious music division of the music publishing firm Charles H. Ditson & Co. He had held that post for 40 years.

His compositional output included the Club House March for band.
