= Laura Sedgwick Collins =

American musician and actress (c. 1859 – 1927)

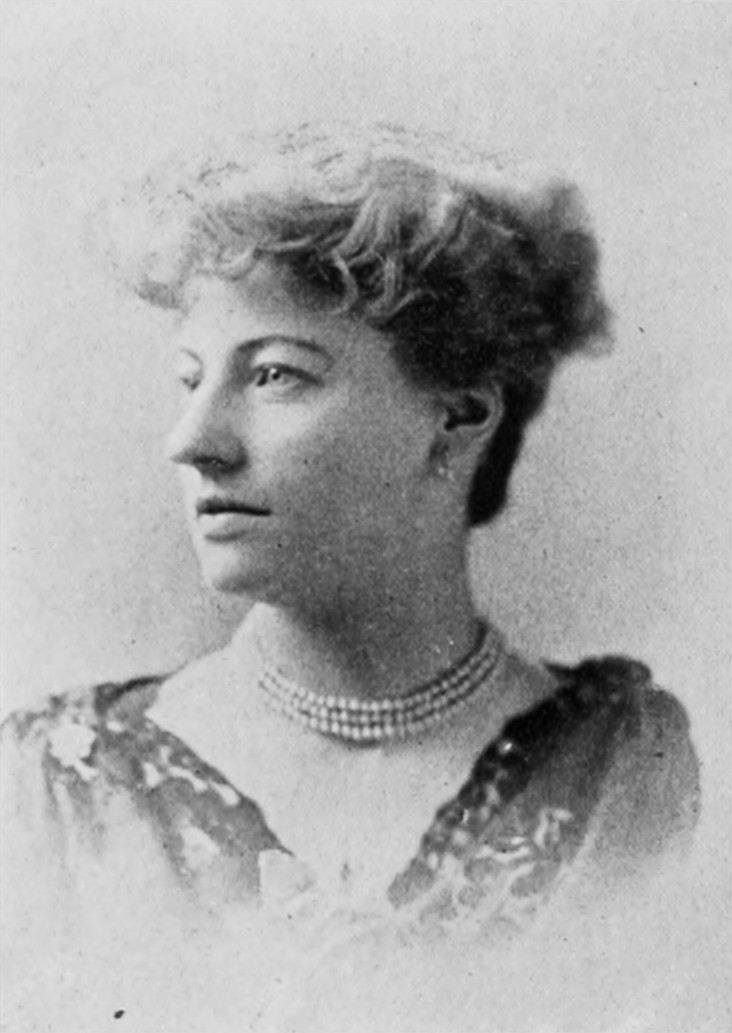
- Collins in A Woman of the Century
- Born: c. 1859; Poughkeepsie, New York, U.S.
- Died: April 20, 1927 (aged 68); New York City, U.S.
- Education: Lyceum School of Acting
- Occupations: composer; musician; lyricist; actress

Laura Sedgwick Collins (c. 1859 – April 20, 1927) was an American musician, composer, lyricist, and actress. Born in Poughkeepsie, she was active as a music educator and composer in New York. While she composed a wide range of works, she was most productive in creating music for the stage and as a composer of art songs. She is remembered for being the first American woman to study music composition with Antonín Dvořák. In 1993, her music was revived in several concerts in the New York City region to mark the centennial of Dvořák's arrival in New York where he was a prominent music teacher.

== Life and career ==
The daughter of John Fletcher Collins and Emily L. Collins, Laura Collins was born in Poughkeepsie, New York, c. 1859. Her mother was a painter and her father was a civil servant. Her initial music studies were with her mother, followed by studies under W. H. B. Matthews, Henry Wolfgang Amadeus Beale, Oscar Coon, and Carl Bergstein. She graduated from the Lyceum School of Acting in New York City and performed in theaters in New York and Brooklyn. She played the piano and wrote music, including "The Two Republics", a march performed at the unveiling of the Statue of Liberty in 1886. She belonged to the Music Teachers National Association, and was a prolific writer of songs for children for use in music education.

Collins studied music composition with Antonín Dvořák, who was a prominent and important teacher in the history of American music education. She is credited as the first woman to study with Dvořák, and was praised by her teacher for creating "real American music" that was "creative, not imitative". She was particularly known for her art songs for which she often served as both lyricist and composer. Her songs were championed by operatic baritone David Bispham during her lifetime, and were also embraced in the repertoires of other singers of her era. Her compositional output also included music for the theatre, symphonic music, and chamber music. She also composed a sacred cantata and an operetta, and worked as a music arranger of German-language folk songs. She was a member of the Manuscript Society of New York, an organization credited as providing opportunities for women composers at a time when opportunities were rarely available elsewhere.

Laura Sedgwick Collins died on April 20, 1927, aged 68, at the Knickerbocker Hospital in Manhattan.

== Resurgence of her music ==
In the early 1990s, there was a brief resurgence of interest in Collins's music in the New York region. In 1993, there were several centennial celebration concerts given in New York, honoring Dvořák's arrival in the city with programs featuring compositions created by Dvořák's students. Some of Collins's music was programmed in a November 1993 concert given by the Brooklyn Philharmonic at the Brooklyn Academy of Music. Earlier that same year, tenor William Brown sang songs by Collins at the Bard Music Festival. Her music was also performed at the 1993 Caramoor Summer Music Festival in the concert "Dvořák and the Folk Connection".

== Partial list of works ==
=== Songs ===
- "A Foolish Little Maiden" (1887)
- "The Origin of the Rainbow" (1908)
- "My Easter Bonnet" (1909)
- "My Philosophy" (1911)
- "Sleepy Time" (1913, words by A. Fitch)
- "Making Love in the Choir" (1914, lyrics by Mrs. T. H. Whitney)
- "Endymion", duet for baritone and soprano with organ, violin, drums, and trumpet accompaniment.
- "Ode to Beauty", for solo voice or a vocal quartet arrangement
- "Old Glory", patriotic song
- "Lincoln Memorial Song", patriotic song
- "Sing Ho, the Merry Autumn Time", for SATB chorus, unaccompanied

=== Stage works ===
- Electra, music for the play (1889), staged at Harvard University and the Hollis Street Theatre
- The Message of History (1910), play and music by Collins; staged at Church of the Divine Paternity
- Jonathan, a tragedy by Thomas Ewing Jr., music by Collins
- Les Précieuses ridicules, play by Molière; music composed by Collins for the first production of the play mounted in England
- The Lotus Pool play by Edwalyn De Kay; music composed by Collins
- Pierrot, music for the play by Alfred Thompson
- Pygmalion and Galatea, play by W. S. Gilbert; music composed by Collins for New York production
- Sarah Tarbox, M. A., play by Charles Barnard, music by Collins
- The Winter's Tale, play by William Shakespeare; music composed by Collins for a staging by David Belasco given at the Lyceum Theatre, Park Avenue South

=== Marches ===
- "The Two Republics" (1886)
- "Graduates March" (1906, composed for New York City Public Schools commencement)
