= Victor Harris (composer) =

American composer conductor

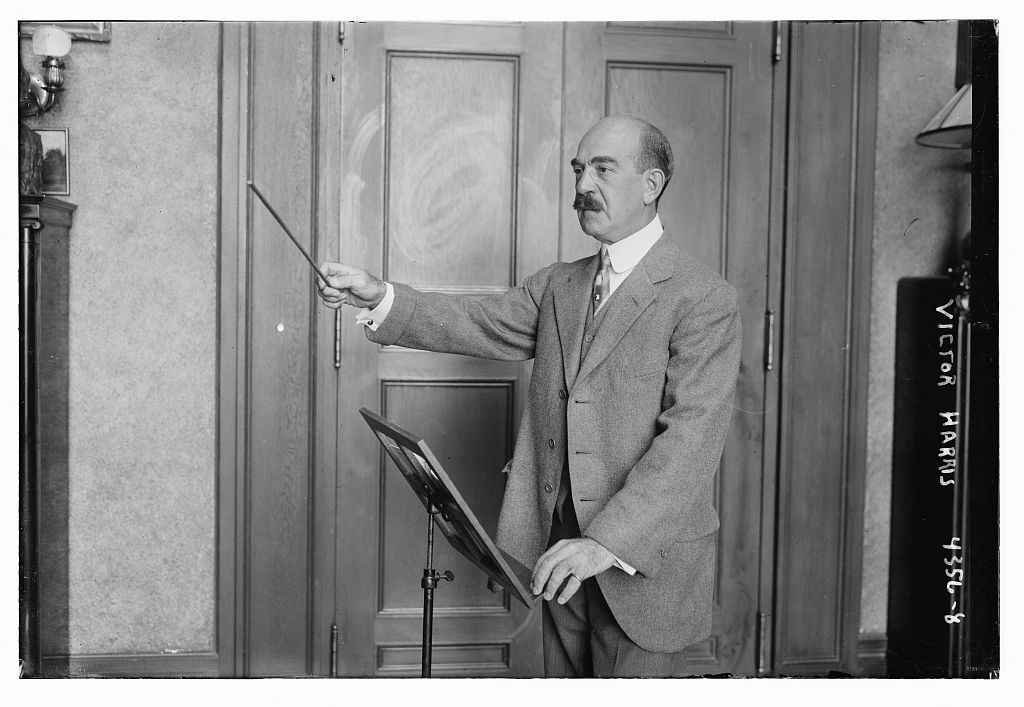
Victor Harris (composer) in 1917

Victor Harris (April 27, 1869 – February 15, 1943) was an American composer, conductor, and music educator.

== Biography ==
He was born in New York, and educated under Charles Blumm, William Courtney (singing), F. K. Schilling (composition), and Anton Seidl (conducting). He was a successful organist, and from 1889 to 1895 held appointments in Tuxedo Park, Brooklyn, and New York. He was one of the first staff members at the Metropolitan Opera where he worked as a vocal coach for three years beginning in 1893. For one season he was conductor of the Utica Choral Union, and served as assistant conductor under Seidl at the Brighton Beach summer concerts (1895–96).

He took up his residence in New York, and established himself as a vocal instructor and composer. He published compositions for piano, organ, and chorus, but was principally known for his songs. Helen Tretbar translated at least one of his songs (A Madrigal) into German. In 1906, he founded the St. Cecilia Chorus, now known as the Cecilia Chorus of New York. He was a member of the Manuscript Society of New York.
