= Elisenda Fábregas =

Spanish-American composer

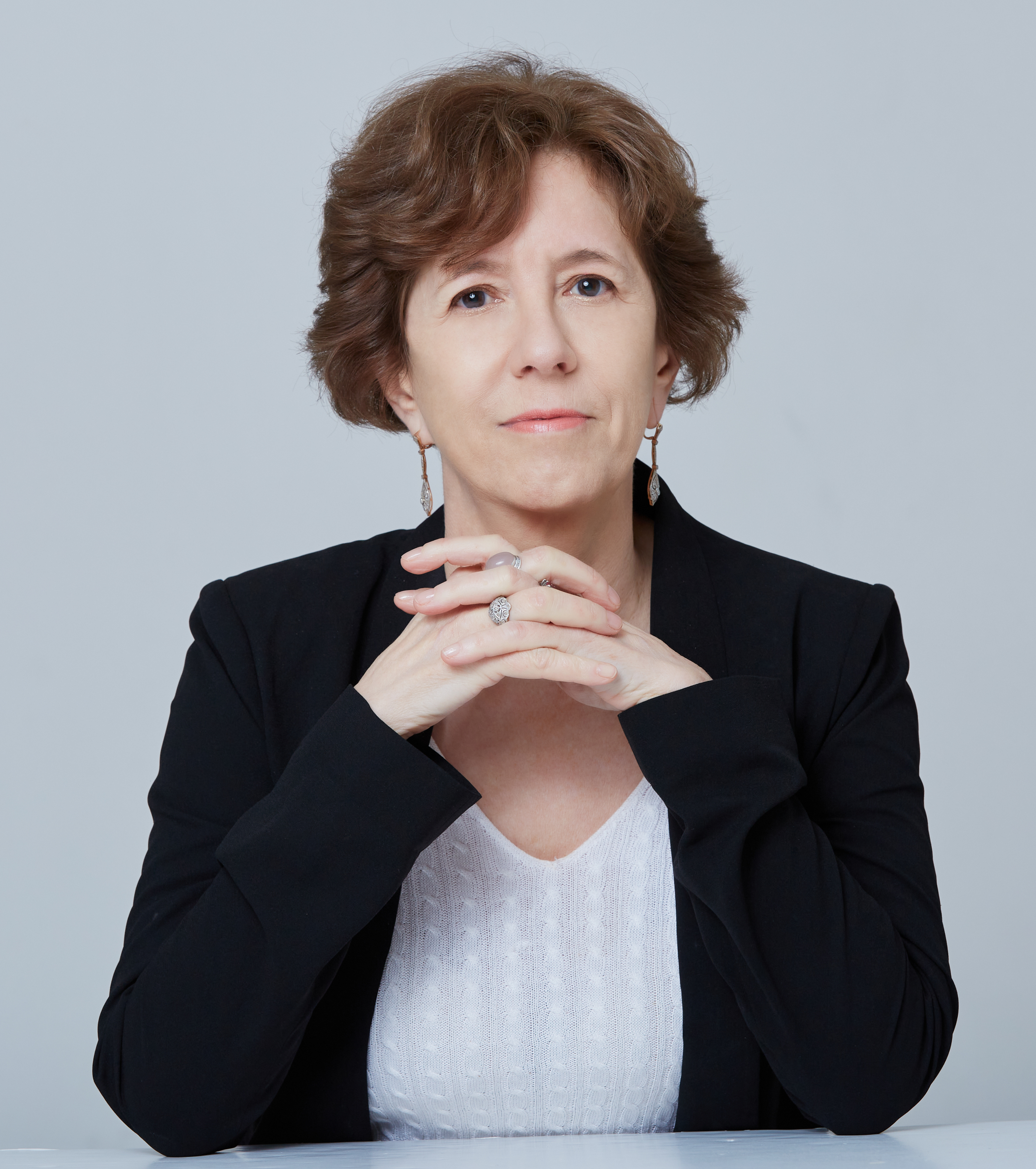
Elisenda Fábregas in 2021

Elisenda Fábregas (born 1955 in Terrassa, Province of Barcelona, Spain) is a Spanish/American composer.

== Biography ==
Fábregas studied piano at the Conservatory of Barcelona until 1977. She came to the USA and studied for her bachelor's and master's degree (1983) in piano performance at Juilliard School of Music with Beveridge Webster and Joseff Raieff and Samuel Sanders. She made her debut in the Carnegie Recital Hall in 1983.

She received doctorates from Columbia University Teachers College in education (1992) and Peabody Institute of the Johns Hopkins University in music composition (2011).

As a pianist she performed besides in Spain, in various countries, England, Korea, Japan, China, Taiwan, and the United States.

From 2010 through 2021 she lived in Seoul, South Korea, and was working as invited professor of music and cultural studies at Kyung Hee University. At present she lives and composes full time in Catalunya, Spain. During the 2023-24 season she was the resident composer at the Palau de la Musica Catalana in Barcelona.

== Awards ==
Fábregas received the Shepherd Distinguished Composer of the Year Award at the Music Teachers National Association Convention in Washington D.C. in 2001.

== Works ==
Fábregas has composed more than fifty works for solo, chamber ensemble, vocal, chorus and orchestra. She has composed several large-scale piano works like Mirage (1997), Portraits I (2000), Homenatge a Mompou (2006), Hommage for Mozart (2006) and Somnis radiants (2022).

- Five Songs (On poems by Federico García Lorca) for soprano and piano, 1986
- Variaciones para Orquesta, 1990
- Five Poems of García Lorca for soprano, cello, clarinet and violin, 1992
- Sonata No. 1 for violin and piano, 1994
- Sonata No. 2 for violin and piano, 1995
- Andante Appassionato for solo flute, 1996
- Sonata No. 1 for flute and piano, 1996
- Mirage for piano, 1997
- Lyric scenes for the young for piano, 1999
- Portraits II for clarinet, violin, cello and piano, 1999
- Cinco Soledades (on poems by Antonio Machado) for basbariton and piano, 1999-2004
- Portraits I for piano, 2000
- Winged serpent for clarinet and piano, 2001
- Album for the Young for piano, thee books (33 pieces), 2002.
- Five musings on the past for soprano and piano, 2002 (text in Spanish by the composer).
- Village Scenes for mezzosoprano and piano, 2002
- Voces de mi tierra for flute, cello and piano, 2003 Pub. Friedrich Hofmeister Musikverlag.
- Miniatures for the Young for piano, 2004
- Moments of change for mezzo-soprano and piano, 2005.
- Hommage a Mozart for piano, 2005. Pub. Friedrich Hofmeister Musikverlag.
- Moments of change (poems by Margaret Atwood) for soprano and piano, 2005
- Colores Andaluces for cello and piano, 2006. Pub. Friedrich Hofmeister Musikverlag.
- Homenatge a Mompou for piano, 2007. Pub. Friedrich Hofmeister Musikverlag.
- Voices of the Rainforest for flute, cello and piano, 2007. Pub. Friedrich Hofmeister Musikverlag.
- The Flaming Rock (La Roca llameante) for choir and string quartet, 2007. Text in English & Spanish
- Goyescas (inspired by Goya for flute and guitar, 2008. Pub. Friedrich Hofmeister Musikverlag.
- Goyescas (inspired by Goya for flute, viola and piano, 2009.Pub. Friedrich Hofmeister Musikverlag.
- Gacelas de amor (poems by Federico García Lorca) for soprano, flute and piano, 2009. Pub. Friedrich Hofmeister Musikverlag.
- Solitary for baritone, clarinet, cello and piano, 2009
- Terra Mater for Symphony Orchestra, 2011
- Retorn a la terra (Return to the homeland, poems by Josep Carner and Joan Maragall) for narrator, clarinet, bassoon, trumpet, trombone, percussion, violin, and double bass, 2012.
- Caminos del duende for marimba and percussion, 2012.
- Ancient walls for violin, 2013.Pub. Friedrich Hofmeister Musikverlag.
- Wandering spirit for violin & piano, 2013. Pub. Friedrich Hofmeister Musikverlag.
- Symphony No. 1 for Symphonic Band, 2014. Commissioned by the Banda Simfònica de Barcelona. Recording available on Naxos Records, Catalan Wind Music Vol. 2.
- Triple Concerto for Piano Trio and Orchestra, 2015.
- Tiempo de amor for tenor, soprano and piano, 2015. Commissioned by the Barcelona festival of Song. Text in Spanish texts by Andalusi poet Ibn Zaydun (1003-1071) and princess Wallada (1011-1091).
- Homenatge a Pau Casals for cello, 2015. Pub. Friedrich Hofmeister Musikverlag.
- Repartido entre tiempo y espacio for soprano, trumpet & piano, 2016. Text in Spanish by Juan Eduardo Cirlot.
- Accents Catalans for orchestra, 2016. Commissioned by the Bucheon Philharmonic Orchestra in Seoul. Premiered at the Concert Hall of the Seoul Arts Center on April 10, 2016.
- Imitació del foc for tenor and piano, 2019. (Catalan text by Bartomeu Rosselló-Pòrcel). Recording released on Bridge Records, Visca L’Amor: Catalan Art Songs of the XX and XXI Centuries.
- Masks for clarinet, cello & piano, ed. 2019/21.
- Danses de la terra for cello, 2020.
- Danses de la terra for viola, 2023.
- Uphill: from Clara to Robert for cello & piano, 2021.
- Dos Colores Andaluces for cello, 2022. arr.
- Castell de Miravet for copla and percussion, 2022. Commissioned by Agrupació Cultural Folklòrica Barcelona in collaboration with Músics per la Cobla for the Memorial Joaquim Serra 2022.
- Parlen les dones for mezzo, SATB choir, orchestra, 2022. Commissioned by El Cor Canta (Catalan choral grup). Setting of poems by Catalan author Montserrat Abelló.
- Aires Catalans for string orchestra, 2023.
- Somnis radiants for piano, 2022. Premiered by Canadian pianist Jaeden Izik-Dzurko at Ruhr Piano Festival in Essen.
- Oda a la fortalesa (Ode to fortitude) for soprano, alto, women's choir and orchestra, 2024. Commissioned by the Palau de la Musica Catalana in Barcelona.
- Quintet for piano and string quartet, 2024. Commissioned by the Palau de la Musica Catalana.
- Bonna Domna for a cappella choir, 2001–24. Commissioned by the Palau de la Musica Catalana.
- Recances (Regrets) for mezzosoprano and piano, 2024. Text in Catalan by Marta Pessarrodona.
- Fiery earth (Terra Encesa) for string quartet, co-commissioned by Cuarteto Casals and Palau de la Musica Catalana, 2024. To be premiered at the Palau de la Musica Catalana on March 19, 2025.
