= Carl August Haupt =

German organist, organ teacher and composer (1810–1891)

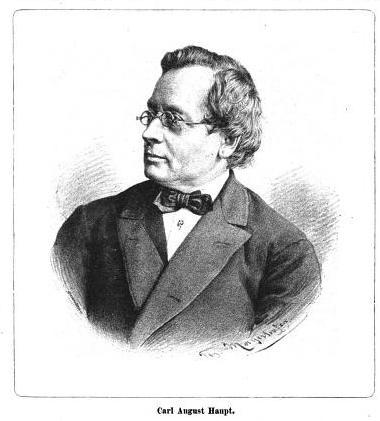
Carl August Haupt

Carl August Haupt (28 August 1810, Kuniów, Silesia – 4 July 1891, Berlin) was a German organist, organ teacher and composer.

Between 1827 and 1830, Haupt was musically trained in Berlin by August Wilhelm Bach, Bernhard Klein and Siegfried Dehn and he also worked as an organist in several churches and Berlin's Parochial Church. He gained a reputation of an outstanding organist and in 1869, he became the successor of August Wilhelm Bach as a director of the Royal Institute for Church Music in Berlin where he taught theory and organ-playing.

1Haupt's compositions include Organ school, Organ choral book and many songs. From his compositions for organ, however, only the Great fugue in C major and two choral arrangements have been preserved. He also published organ works of his deceased friend Carl Ludwig Thiele.

His students included John Knowles Paine, Edward Morris Bowman, Otto Dienel, Edward Fisher, James Hotchkiss Rogers, Gerrit Smith, Whitney Eugene Thayer, Samuel Prowse Warren and Arnold Mendelssohn. See: List of music students by teacher: G to J#Carl August Haupt.

== Sources ==
- German Wikipedia article
