= Philosophy of architecture =

Philosophy of architecture is a branch of philosophy of art, dealing with the aesthetic value of architecture, its semantics and relations with the development of culture.

== History ==
=== Early history ===
Plato, whose influence on architecture is widely documented (e.g., 'idealism', 'neo-Platonic' architecture), may be counted as part of a classical geometric model of cosmology, the popularity of which could be attributed to earlier thinkers such as Pythagoras. In early history, philosophers distinguished architecture ('technion') from building ('demiorgos'), attributing the former to mental traits, and the latter to the divine or natural. The presence of some degree of formalism continues to be an important trait in distinguishing one architectural style from another, and thus in distinguishing the philosophy of a style.

Due to the nature of critique, the philosophy of architecture is an outgrowth of the philosophy of art, which began to be expressed in books on architecture and history of architecture during the latter half of the twentieth century. Prior to that, largely because of its reliance on technology and engineering, architecture was seen as incompatible, or beneath, the proper subject areas of classical aesthetics as delimited by, notably, Immanuel Kant and Alexander Gottlieb Baumgarten, with their ideal of "pure art."

=== Modern period ===
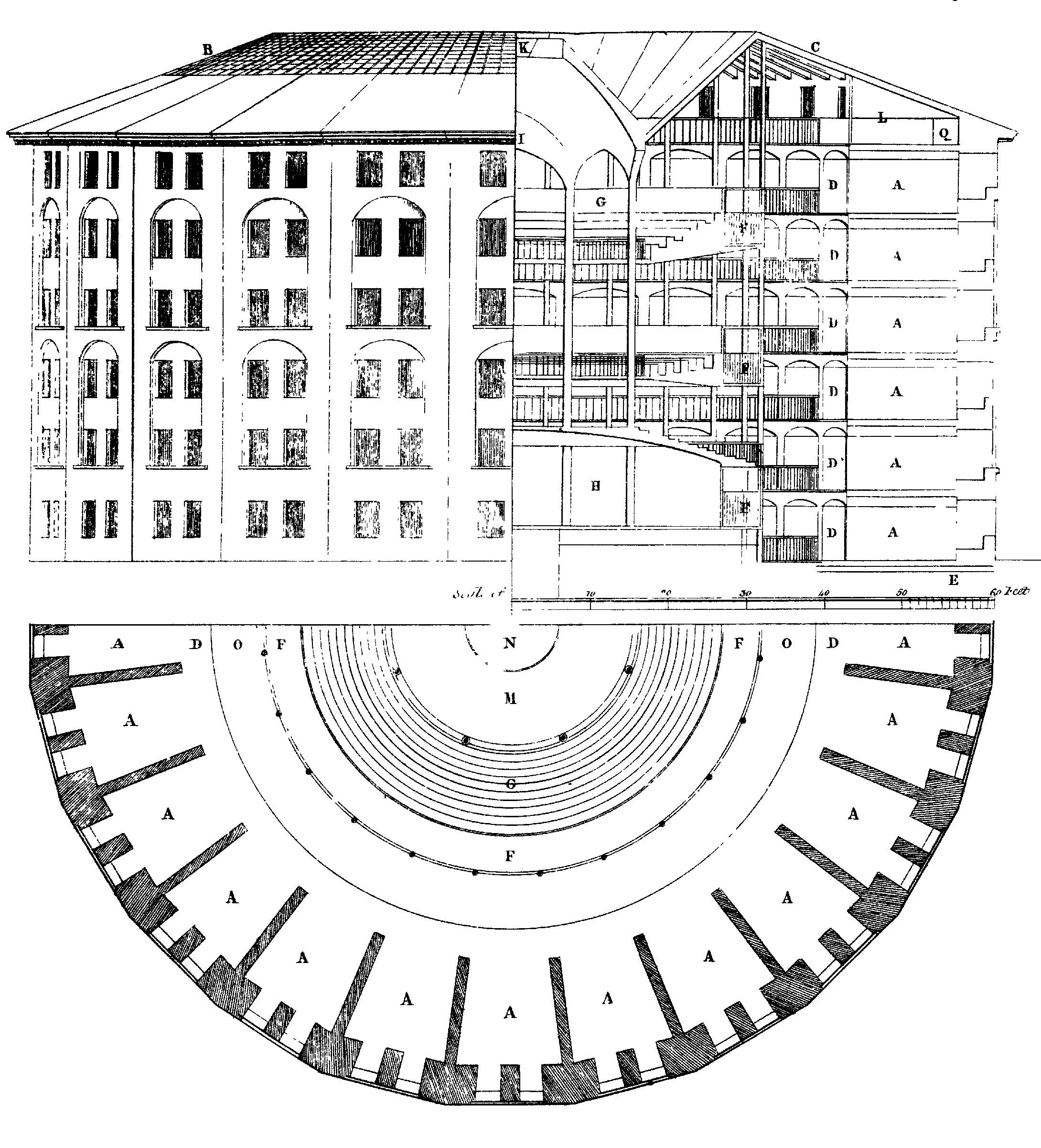
Panopticon. Drawing by Jeremy Bentham in 1791.

As it was noted by postmodern philosopher Michel Foucault, the architecture is able to set the life of society, and therefore it is particularly important for understanding of the person's values and culture. In "Discipline and Punish," Foucault analyzed contemporary culture through comparisons to the Panopticon. The Panopticon, designed by Jeremy Bentham would be a special transparent environment for prisoners, where everyone would be under constant surveillance. Although the project was not realized, Bentham's thought deeply influenced the ideology of prisons, changing social practices of punishment. Simultaneously with its main conclusions, Foucault reached other goal - his instrumental use of architecture in cultural studies showed the potential of this philosophical theme.

However, philosophy of architecture as a full-fledged part of the Philosophy of Art would not have been possible without the Avant-garde`s shift of the aesthetic paradigm. Art, set in the conditions of mechanical reproduction of the image, was forced to look for new ways. Around the same time architectural styles of Constructivism and Functionalism find way to justify new, totally engineering aesthetics. Side of the architecture, which had been considered a shame (as a sign of its connection with the pragmatic needs of man and society), became a major advantage, central part of new system of aesthetic values. Cubism and Futurism set aesthetic, full of mechanized, slaughtered, brutal forms, what was very close to the same engineering ideal. All this created more than favorable environment to change status of architecture in our system of art, as well as our understanding of art by itself.

=== Postmodernism ===
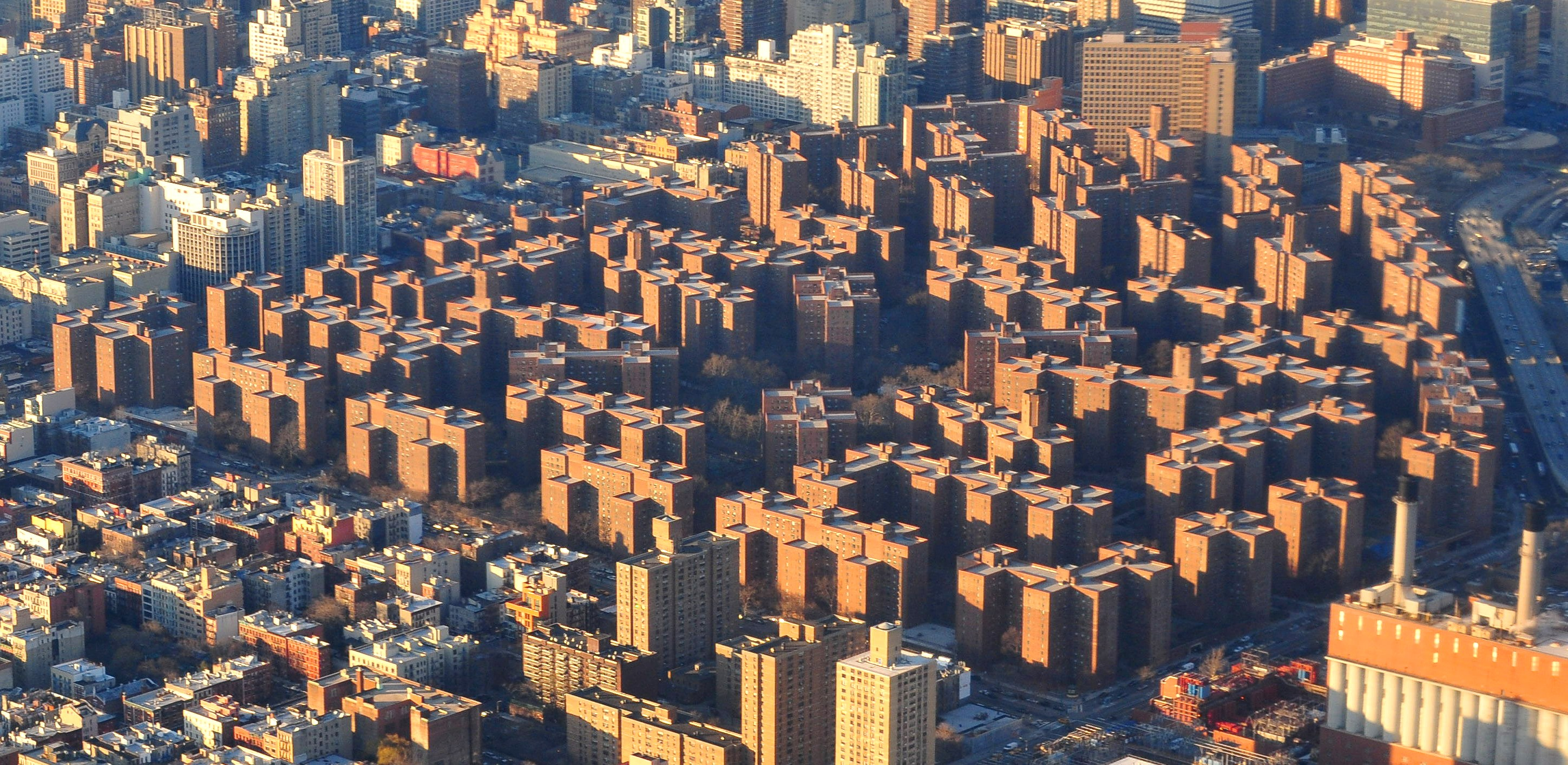
Photography "Stuyvesant Town - Peter Cooper Village," according to Martin R. it is an architectural work, which may serve as one of the first manifestations of postmodernism

Architecture assumed a much more significant role after establishing of the phenomenon of Postmodernism. According to R. Martin "it remains surprising how many influential accounts of cultural postmodernism make reference to architecture." Some scholars go so far as to claim that the entire post-modernism comes from the practice of architecture, and the rejection of "style of Modern" as an architectural style, and by so architects terminologically formulated postmodernism. Thus, F. Jameson writes that "it is in the realm of architecture, however, that modifications in aesthetic production are most dramatically visible, and that their theoretical problems have been most centrally raised and articulated (...) it was indeed from architectural debates that my own conception of post-modernism (...) initially began to emerge." As it was noted by researchers, "Barthes and Eco, taking their cue from Russian Formalism, see norm breaking as the mark of the aesthetic (sc., the aesthetic code). Art is characteristically inventive in its capacity to have signs do duty as signifier of further meanings in a potentially endless play upon convention as well as within it or on its margin." So important to postmodern writers like R. Barthes and U. Eco, saw architecture as a source of revolutionary innovations in art.

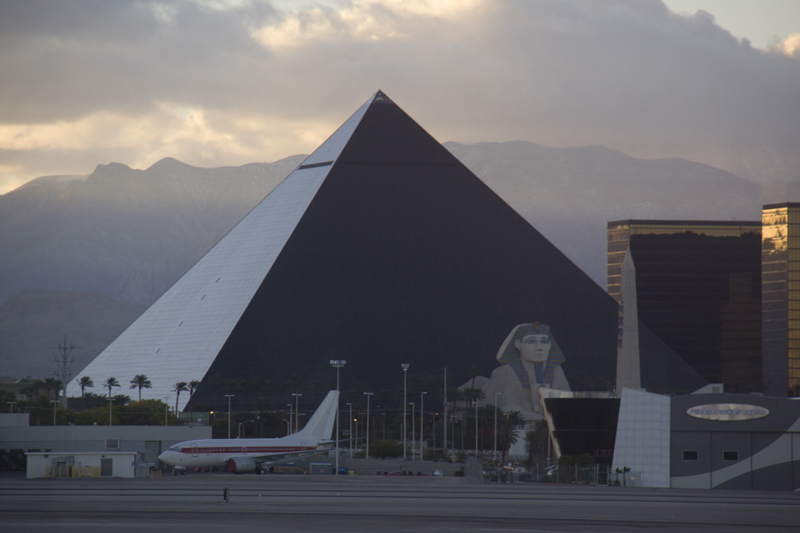
The Luxor Casino in Las Vegas formed the basis for Robert Venturi's post-modernist manifesto and has played a key role in the development of post-modernism according to F. Jameson

F. Jameson believes that there is a special relationship between postmodernism and American architecture, in which the birth of a national architecture coincided, in his opinion, with the emergence of the terminology or even the reality of postmodernism. However, not all researchers agree with his post-modern "architectural origins," so Andreas Huyssen, suggests that the conceptual frame of postmodernism has been defined within certain movements of literature. However, this researcher also notes the special role of architecture in the development of post-modernism. Martin describes, that "Huyssen credits architecture with helping to disseminate the term postmodernism, originally from literature, into the expanded aesthetic sphere during the 1970s." Lyotard contends that postmodern architects have nothing in common with true Postmodernism and, as Lyotard states it in his article, Answering the Question: What Is Postmodernism?: "under the name of postmodernism, architects are getting rid of the Bauhaus project, throwing out the baby of experimentation with the bathwater of functionalism."

Robert Venturi's writing played role in the development of architectural postmodernism. Venturi first drew the attention of architects to pop-art, and showed a connection between iconography and architectural forms.

== Wittgenstein and philosophy of architecture ==
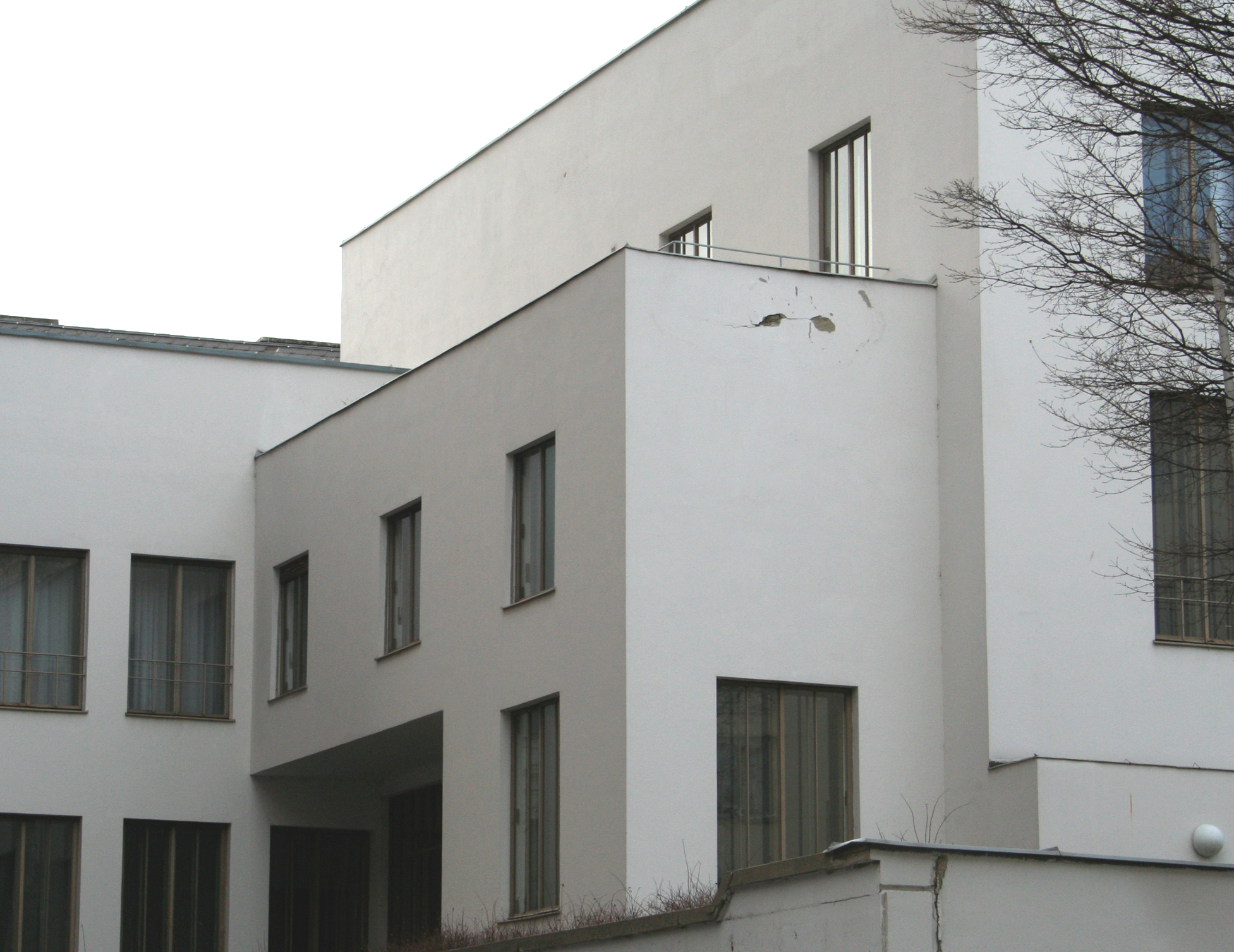
A photo of Wittgenstein House

The Wittgenstein House is considered one of the most important examples of interactions between philosophy and architecture. Built by renowned Austrian philosopher Ludwig Wittgenstein, the house has been the subject of extensive research about the relationship between its stylistic features, Wittgenstein's personality, and his philosophy.
