= Giorgio Miceli =

Italian composer

- Born: 21 October 1836; Reggio Calabria, Italy
- Died: 1895 (aged 58–59)
- Occupation: Composer

Giorgio Miceli (21 October 1836 in Reggio Calabria – 1895, Italy) was an Italian opera composer who played mandolin and wrote music for the instrument.

He was the composer for the operetta Zoe and for the music A Grand Serenade for Mandolin Band. He wrote other works for both the mandolin and the guitar, as well as for other instruments.

His son Giuseppe Miceli was also a successful performer and composer for the mandolin, including Danza Zingaresca for mandolin with piano accompaniment.

== Family history ==
Giorgio Miceli was a son of well-off parents, who participated in the Italian revolution of 1847. His father was sentenced to row in the galleys as punishment, and Giorgio was sent to Naples. He had begun to learn mandolin from his uncle when he was seven-years old, and in Naples, he continued to study music under Gallo and under Giuseppe Lillo at the Naples Conservatory.

His operetta Zoe, performed in 1852, was his first; he was only 16. Zoe was given in 40 performances, and he had a second opera the next year which performed similarly. His plays were banned by the Naples authorities and he became a teacher. He continued to play, entering musical competitions in Naples and Florence. His work A Grand Serenade for Mandolin Band, done for the Maritime Exhibition in Naples did well, and he was knighted as a result in 1875.

== Operas ==
The 1910 book Dictionary-Catalogue of Operas and Operettas which Have Been Performed on the Public Stage: Libretti listed Miceli and some of his works:

- Zoe
- Amanti sessagenarli
- Conte di Rossiglione
- Convito di Baldassare
- Fata
- Feodora
- Fidanzata
- Jefte
- (La figlia di) Leggenda di Pisa
- Rapimento
- Serena
- Somnambule
