= Smith Newell Penfield =

American composer

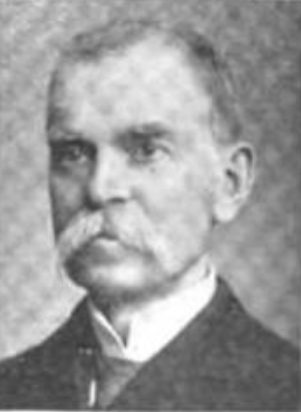
- Born: April 4, 1837; Oberlin, Ohio
- Died: January 7, 1920 (aged 82); New York, New York
- Education: Oberlin College
- Occupation: Composer

Smith Newell Penfield (April 4, 1837 – January 7, 1920) was an American composer and organist.

== Early life and education ==
Penfield was born at Oberlin, Ohio. He studied at Oberlin College, graduating in 1858. He studied at the Conservatory of Music at Leipzig with Ignaz Moscheles, Carl Reinecke, Ernst Richter, and Moritz Hauptmann, graduating in 1869. He received a doctorate in music from New York University in 1885.

== Career ==
Back in the United States, he worked as a music teacher in Rochester and founded a Mozart Club and a Conservatory in Savannah. In 1885, he served as President of the Music Teachers National Association.

His compositions included a setting of Psalm 18, an overture, a string quartet, pieces for organ and for piano, choral works, and songs.

== Personal life ==
Penfield married Sarah Elizabeth Hoyt in 1860. They had a daughter.
