= W. H. Neidlinger =

William Harold Neidlinger (July 20, 1863 – December 5, 1924) was an American music pedagogue and composer. He was well known for his musical compositions spanning from religious topics to children's entertainment and was active as a choral conductor and organist.

== Biography ==
Neidlinger was born in Brooklyn, New York. He was a student of Dudley Buck, making Buck's influences and preferred themes being imprinted in his works. Before settling in Chicago in 1901, Niedlinger was a music teacher in Brooklyn Institute of Arts and Sciences and studied in Paris and London. He became the founder of a school for children with Intellectual disability.

Neidlinger was also the composer of multiple songs for Camp Fire Girls of America that were used for the social rituals at that time. His most famous composition is The Birthday of a King. He was a member of the Manuscript Society of New York. He died in 1924 in East Orange, New Jersey.
