= Dudley Buck =

American composer and organist (1839–1909)

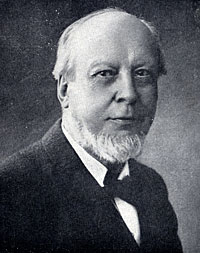
- Born: March 10, 1839; Hartford, Connecticut
- Died: October 6, 1909 (aged 70); West Orange, New Jersey
- Resting place: Rosedale Cemetery, Montclair, New Jersey
- Occupation: Publisher
- Era: Romantic

Dudley Buck (March 10, 1839 – October 6, 1909) was an American composer, organist, and writer on music. He published several books, most notably the Dictionary of Musical Terms and Influence of the Organ in History, which was published in New York City in 1882.

He is best known today for his organ composition, Concert Variations on The Star-Spangled Banner, Op. 23, which was later arranged into an orchestral version.

== Life and career ==
Born in Hartford, Connecticut, Buck was the son of a merchant who gave him every opportunity to cultivate his musical talents. After attending Trinity College (Connecticut) from 1855–1858, he studied in Leipzig at the Leipzig Conservatory where his teachers included: Ernst Richter and Moritz Hauptmann, composition and harmony; Ignaz Moscheles and Louis Plaidy, piano; Julius Rietz, orchestration; and Johann Gottlob Schneider, organ. He then pursued further studies in Dresden (again with Schneider) and Paris. On returning to America he held positions of organist in Hartford's North Congregational Church and Chicago's St. James' Episcopal Church (1869). In Albany for a recital in 1871, he got news the Great Chicago Fire destroyed his church, home, and all his possessions, so returned to Chicago and quickly moved his family to Boston. There, Buck accepted the position of organist for the Music Hall Association, organist and choir director at St. Paul's Episcopal Church (now Cathedral), and joined the faculty of the New England Conservatory.

In 1875 Buck went to New York City for a prolonged and professionally fruitful period. He assisted Theodore Thomas as conductor of orchestral concerts, including the Central Park Garden Concerts. In 1877 he began a 25-year post as organist at Holy Trinity Church in Brooklyn. He founded the Apollo Club, an organization dedicated to promoting choral music in Brooklyn, likely molded after the Apollo Club founded in Boston in 1871.

The U.S. Centennial commissioned a cantata from Buck and Sidney Lanier; it was performed at the exposition's opening day on May 10, 1876. In 1898 Buck was elected to the National Institute of Arts and Letters.

Towards the end of his tenure at Holy Trinity, new church leadership publicly expressed criticism of the church's music program. In 1901 it led to Buck announcing his resignation from Holy Trinity effective May 1902, whereupon he took the job of organist and choirmaster at Plymouth Congregational Church in Brooklyn. This position lasted only a year, before Buck retired and spent the next few years with his wife in Germany.

He returned to the United States in 1909, and died a few months later at his son's house in West Orange, New Jersey. His funeral was held at Grace Episcopal Church in Manhattan; his own compositions In Memoriam and Over the Treetops There Is Rest were sung by the Apollo Club. He was buried in Rosedale Cemetery in Montclair, New Jersey (the same burial site as other notable hymn composers Lowell Mason, Mary Artemisia Lathbury, and George Webb).

Several memorials were held after his death, including one led by E. H. Joyce in October 1910 at Bridgeport's First Presbyterian Church, and one led by John Hyatt Brewer (who had replaced Buck as conductor of the Apollo Club in 1903) in January 1911 in Brooklyn's Lafayette Avenue Presbyterian Church.

Buck also taught private music lessons throughout his career. Among his notable pupils were Charles Ives, Paul Ambrose, C. B. Hawley, William Howland, Daniel Protheroe, Harry Rowe Shelley, James Francis Cooke, Charles Sanford Skilton, and W. H. Neidlinger.

== Writings ==
Buck's published books include:

- Buck's New and Complete Dictionary of Musical Terms (1873)
- Illustrations in Choir Accompaniment with Hints on Registration (1877)
- The Influence of the Organ in History (1882)
- Musical Pronouncing Dictionary (in at least 8 editions)
- Some Thoughts for the Singer (1908)

== Compositions ==
Buck was a prolific composer, in spite of having lost most of his manuscripts in St. James Episcopal Church's 1871 fire. His works include operas, cantatas, anthems, sacred songs, and organ works. Among them are:

Choral works:

- Motette Collection (1869)
- The Legend of Don Munio, op. 64 (1874), setting of Washington Irving text (a chapter from Tales of the Alhambra) for small chorus and orchestra
- The Centennial Meditation of Columbia (1876), a cantata, text by Sidney Lanier, commissioned for the U.S. Centennial and performed at its opening ceremony
- The Nun of Nidaros, op. 83 (1879), setting of Longfellow text for chorus, soloists, piano obbligato, reed organ, and string quartet ad libitum
- Golden Legend (1880)
- King Olaf's Christmas (1881), setting of Longfellow text for chorus, soloists, piano obbligato, reed organ, and string quartet ad libitum
- Voyage of Columbus (1885)
- The Light of Asia (1886)
- The Triumph of God
- In Memoriam
- Over the Treetops There Is Rest

Songs:

- Three Songs for Mezzo-Soprano (Where are the Swallows Fled?, Down by the Mill, The Sunset's Smile has Left the Sky)
- Five Songs for alto or baritone (Morning Land, Spring Song, Expectancy, Sunset (based on Sidney Lanier poem), "Storm and Sunshine")
- Five Songs for tenor or soprano (Thou art Mine!, Shadow Land, I Love Thee, The Silent World is Sleeping, Creole Lover's Song)
- Five Songs for Baritone (Where the Lindens Bloom, Bedouin Love Song, The Capture of Bacchus, The Gypsies, When Life Hath Sorrow Found)
- Five Songs for mezzo-soprano or baritone (In June, Love's Remorse, Alone!, Spring's Awakening, Crossing the Bar)
- "Evening Song", Op. 76
- "Twilight"
- "Boots and Saddles (A Soldier's Farewell)"
- "Falstaff's Song"
- "There's a Merry Brown Thrush"
- "The Tempest" (dramatic poem)
- "Where Did You Come From, Baby Dear?"
- "Why Love Is King"

Operas:

- Deseret, or A Saint's Affliction comic opera (1880); survives only in fragments, selections published
- Serâpis, opera (1889); manuscript

Orchestral:

- Marmion, symphonic overture (1878)
- Festival Overture on the American National Air, "The Star-Spangled Banner," (1879)

Organ:

- Grand Sonata in E-flat, Op. 22 (1866)
- Concert Variations on "The Star-Spangled Banner," Op. 23 (1868)
- Triumphal March, Op. 26 (1868)
- Impromptu Pastorale, Op. 27 (1868)
- Eighteen Studies in Pedal Phrasing, Op. 28 (1868)
- Variations for Organ on "Home, Sweet Home," Op. 30 (1868)
- Rondo-Caprice, Op. 35 (1868)
- Wedding March, Op. 44 (1871)
- 6 Short Choral Preludes, Op. 49 (1871)
- Variations on a Scotch Air (Annie Laurie), Op. 51 (1871)
- At Evening, Op. 52 (1871)
- "The Last Rose of Summer" varied for the Organ, Op. 59 (1877)
- Organ Sonata No. 2 in G Minor, Op. 77 (1877)
- Variations on "Old Folks at Home" (1888)
- 4 Tone Pictures (1891)
- Festival Prelude (c. 1896)
