= Bruno Klein =

American classical composer

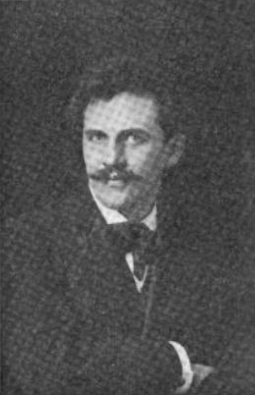
Bruno Oscar Klein

Bruno Oscar Klein (6 June 1858 — 22 June 1911) was an American composer and organist of German origin. He wrote a number of works for orchestra, some chamber music, church music, and a large number of songs.

== Life and career ==
Born in Osnabrück, Klein began his musical training in piano and composition with his father who made a living as an organist. He then studied at the Munich Conservatory (MC) from 1875-1878 where he was a pupil of Carl Baermann, Josef Rheinberger, and Franz Wüllner.

After graduating from the MC, Klein came to the United States in 1878 at the age of 20. After touring and concertizing for several years, he settled in New York City in 1883 where he became involved with managing the German Theatre on Madison Ave. He served as the head of the piano department at the Convent of the Sacred Heart from 1884 until his death 27 years later. In 1894-1895 he returned to Germany to perform as a concert soloist. He was organist at the Church of Saint Francis Xavier from 1884 to 1894 and at St. Ignatius Loyola from 1900 until his death. He taught voice and composition on the faculty at the National Conservatory of Music of America and out of a private studio, and was a member of the New York State Music Teachers' Association. Among his pupils were Paul Ambrose, Oscar Saenger, and Clara Anna Korn.

He also was an officer of New York's musical club The Tonkünstler Society founded in 1898 (along with colleagues like Leo Schulz, Edward Graef, and Louis Saar). In 1907, he was a founding member of another music club the Bohemian Club (along with notable colleagues like Rubin Goldmark, Rafael Joseffy, and Max Spicker). In 1904 he founded the Dramatic Oratorio Society with Selma Kronold with the goal of producing musical dramas based on the bible.

Klein died in 1911 at his home on Madison Ave in Manhattan. He was 53 years old; he was survived by his wife Olive and son Karl Klein. Karl was a violin prodigy born in 1886 who studied in New York with Ovide Musin and Eugene Boegner, and in Europe with Ysaye, Arno Hilf, and August Wilhelmj. He was a Steinway Artist.

Among the compositions dedicated to Klein were Gaston Dethier's organ composition Andante Grazioso and Constantin von Sternberg's 4 Piano Pieces.

== Selected compositions ==
- Kenilworth, opera, libretto by Wilhelm Müller's based on Walter Scott's novel. Premiered Feb 17th 1895 in Hamburg with Katharina Klafsky in the lead Amy Robsart role as a benefit performance, Baptiste Hoffmann as Varney, and Otto Lohse conducting. Excerpts were performed in 1896 at Carnegie Hall.
- Keno, a comic opera in two acts with libretto by Donn Piatt, written in Cincinnati while Klein was staying in Piatt Castles. The opera was given a private production in Cincinnati, but was unsuccessfully shopped to producers in New York.
- Sonata for violin and piano, played the composer and his son at the Bohemian Club's inaugural Evening With Music in 1908
- Quintet for soprano voice, piano, violin, cello, and horn. Premiered at a 1909 Bohemian Club Evening with Music by the composer, Shanna Cumming, his son Karl Klein, Leo Schulz, and Herman Dutschke.
- Menuetto for solo cello (likely premiered by Leo Schulz at the same concert as his Quintet)
- Liebeslied (performed by Theodore Thomas' orchestra at 1885 matinee concert)
- Hochzeits-Klänge (performed by Theodore Thomas' orchestra at 1885 matinee concert)
- The Soul of the Rose, song, lyrics by Lucy Cleveland.
- My Mother's Memory, song, words by John Boyle O'Reilly
- At Magnolia Cemetery, song, words by Henry Timrod
- Le Secret d'Amour, for organ
- Intermezzo, for organ. Dedicated to Gerrit Smith, New York
- Early Morn at the Monastery, for organ. Dedicated to Gerrit Smith, New York.
- Adoro Te
- O Sanctissima
- Salve Regina
- Beati Omnes, Psalm 127
- Ecce Sacerdos Magnus
- Pie Jesus
- Manum Suam Misit Hostia
- Ego Vir Videns
- O Salutaris Hostia
- Aleph. Ego vir videns
- Resonet in laudibus
- Come Hither And in Worship, Kneel, hymn with words by Rev. M. Russell
- Come To Me, All You That Labor, hymn
- My Home I've Left And Wandered, hymn with words by Thomas Keruan
- The Child in Bethlehem's Manger Lies, carol with words by John J. Branin
- Christopher Columbus, ode, words by Eliza Allen Starr
- Jesus Lives, for choir
- Abide With Me, sacred song
- Jesus the Very Thought of Thee
- There is a Green Hill Far Away
- Nuit Arabe for piano
- Songs Op. 3, including No. 1 Mondlied with words by E. Mörike
- Violin Sonata No. 1, Op. 10
- 2 Notturnos, op. 14
- Valse Caprice, op. 15
- Scènes de Ballet, Op. 19 orchestral
- Dreams, Op. 20 for piano, after Heine's Buch der Lieder
- Gretchen am Spinnrad, Op. 21
- Suite for piano, Op. 25 (including No. 3 Minuetto, and No. 5 Gavotte)
- Suite in F for cello and orchestra, Op. 28, premiered by the New York Philharmonic in 1903.
- Paschal Mass, op. 30
- Violin Sonata No. 2 in B minor, op. 31, dedicated to Ysaye
- 2 Morceaux, op. 32 for piano (A Secret of Love, and Dialogue)
- Songs, Op. 34 (including No. 3 Drinking Song, No. 3 From Youth's Happy Days, No. 5 In Spring, and No. 6 Evening Song)
- Dance Bohémienne, Op. 35
- Valse Noble, for piano op. 39
- Album Poétique for piano, op. 40 (including No. 2 Abends im Walde, and No. 6 Capriccietto)
- Pensee Poetique, Op. 41 No. 1 for piano
- Missa de Nativitate Domini, op. 44
- 6 Motets, op. 45
- Italian Suite Op. 50 for piano (including No. 2 Canzonetta, No. 3 Menuetto, No. 4 Alla Tarantella)
- Pieces for piano Op. 52 (including No. 4 The Swallows, and No. 7 Spanish Intermezzo)
- Recollections of Childhood Days, Op. 53 for piano (collection of 10 pieces)
- Book of New Piano Music, op. 54 (collection of 8 pieces)
- Album for Young Pianists, Op. 55
- American Dances, op. 58 for orchestra and in arrangement for piano four-hands (including In Old Kentucky, American Military March, Virginia Reel, and Passe-pied)
- Four Easy Duets for Piano, op. 60 (including Intermezzo religioso, Valse gracieuse, Berceuse, Gavotte)
- Christ the Lord is Risen To-Day, op. 64 no. 2
- Songs, op. 65 for high voice (including To the Wood Lark with words by Robert Burns, Golden-tressed Adelaide with words by Bryan Waller Proctor, Hush Thee, Baby with lyrics by Talcott M. Banks, Nae Shoon to Hide Her Tiny Taes (The Babie) with words by Hugh Miller, and Last Night with words by Theo Marzials)
- It Is Not Death To Die, a song for Easter in high voice in D with violin obligato, Op. 66 No. 1, words by Dr. Malan.
- Songs for piano, op. 68 (including Les Créoles, and At the Window)
- 5 Songs, op. 74 for soprano (including No. 1The Gipsy's Secret with lyrics by Tirza Mira, No. 2 Neath the moon's silver beaming with lyrics by Otto Franz Gensichen, Departed with lyrics by Karl Stieler, Two Roses with lytics by F. Volcker, and Secreted with lyrics by P. Scherer, all of which were published with English translations by Helen Tretbar)
- Five Piano Pieces, op. 75 (including Ave Maria, Valse Gracieuse, Cuban Dance, Notturno, and Gavotte. May share some material with op. 60)
- Ave Verum, Op. 76 No. 7
- 4 American Dances, op. 80 for piano four-hands (a companion work to Op 58, including No. 9 In Alabama)
- Mass in B-Flat, op. 85
- Hymns and Motets, Op. 86
- Berceuse, op. 89 for piano, dedicated to Emil Liebling
- Missa Brevis, op. 90
- Tantum ergo, op. 91 for mixed voices
- Etude de Concert, op. 94 for piano
- Concert Piece for Piano and Orchestra
- Piano Concerto in E, dedicated to Rafael Joseffy
