= Music Teachers National Association =

American nonprofit professional organization

- Abbreviation: MTNA
- Formation: 1876; 150 years ago
- Founder: Theodore Presser
- Founded at: Delaware, Ohio
- Type: 501(c)(3) organization
- Tax ID no.: 31-1619186
- Legal status: Active
- Headquarters: Cincinnati, Ohio
- Members: 17,000
- CEO: Brian Shepard
- President: Kevin T. Chance, NCTM
- Website: http://www.mtna.org

Music Teachers National Association (MTNA) is an American nonprofit professional organization for the support, growth, and development of music-teaching professionals, with more than 17,000 members in 50 states, and more than 500 affiliated local and state organizations. MTNA offers a wide range of member resources, from leadership, teaching and personal health support, to insurance, financial and legal services. It also comprises two subsidiaries, the MTNA Professional Certification Program, and the MTNA Foundation Fund, which supports a variety of programs that include music competitions and commissioning of composers. MTNA was founded in 1876, and is registered as a 501(c)(3) organization in Ohio, with headquarters located in Cincinnati.

== History ==
Music Teachers National Association is an American organization founded in 1876 by Theodore Presser, who was both a musician and publisher. MTNA is credited in helping to establish an international pitch scale in 1883 as well as promoting international copyright law and giving official recognition to the American composer. In 1967, MTNA approved the program for qualified teachers. MTNA is also known for commissioning compositions by American composers and presenting the annual Distinguished Composer of the Year Award. The association also holds annual competitions for young musicians at the local, state, and national level. Currently, the organization has approximately 17,000 members, including teachers, performers, and composers, and more than 500 affiliated local and state organizations.

MTNA's purpose is to advance the benefit of studying music and music making to society and to support the professionalism of music teachers. MTNA maintains two subsidiary programs: MTNA Professional Certification Program and the MTNA Foundation Fund. The Professional Certification Program exists to improve the quality of professionalism in applied music teaching and assists the public in identifying proficient music teachers in their communities. The MTNA Foundation Fund supports programs that financially assist teachers and students with educational objectives while supplying an opportunity for individual and corporate support of MTNA and its programs.

== Awards and Special Programs ==
As an association of music teachers, MTNA's mission is to elevate the professional level and develop the standing of all its members. MTNA is responsible for disseminating many publications, including books, journals, and pamphlets that have greatly impacted the profession of teaching music. MTNA also perpetually seeks newly published music and other teaching materials to raise awareness among its members.

=== The Certification of Teachers ===
According to MTNA, "The National Certification Plan is one of the highest importance to the professional welfare of the music teacher, and it provides a means of measuring and recognizing his or her professional growth. It represents almost a century of consultation and deliberation on the part of America's musical leaders."

=== MTNA Forums ===
The independent music teachers forum of MTNA was the first established in 1972, at the MTNA Convention in Portland, Oregon. After this initial meeting, IMTF organized different committees on the local and state levels. Its purpose was "To investigate the role of the full time independent teacher in American society today: the problems, advantages, and practices of this group, with the goal of establishing a true profession in this decade."

Multiple forums now exist through MTNA. They provide an environment for open discussion and the expression of ideas. These forums meet annually at the MTNA conference. These forums include:

- Arts Awareness & Advocacy
- Collaborative Performance
- College Faculty
- Collegiate Chapters
- Independent Teachers
- Local Associations
- Wellness

=== "Distinguished Composer of the Year" Award ===
First awarded in 1969, the terms of the Distinguished Composer of the Year Award state that an MTNA-affiliated state music teachers association could commission any composer of their choice to compose a work for their state convention. Recording and scores of these works could then be sent to the national headquarters in Cincinnati. From these commissions, one composer is selected each year by a panel of judges to receive the "Distinguished Composer Award," otherwise known as the "Composer of the Year" award.

Previous winners include:

- Liliya Ugay (2024)
- Robert McClure (2023)
- Charles N. Mason (2022)
- Delvyn Case (2021)
- Peter Van Zandt Lane (2020)
- Bret Bohman (2019)
- Benjamin Krause (2018)
- Philip Schuessler (2017)
- David Gompper (2016)
- David von Kampen (2015)
- Christos Tsitsaros (2014)
- Michael-Thomas Foumai (2013)
- Thomas Osborne (2012)
- M. Shawn Hundley (2011)
- Seth Custer (2010)
- Pierre Jalbert (2009)
- William Price (2008)
- John McDonald (2007)
- David Froom (2006)
- Michael Djupstrom (2005)
- Stefan Freund (2004)
- Liduino Pitombeira (2003)
- Timothy Hoekman (2002)
- David Mullikin (2001)
- Elisenda Fábregas (2000)
- Laurence Bitensky (1999)
- Erik Santos (1998)

== National Conference ==
The MTNA National Conference, which is held annually, brings together the constituents of the MTNA membership. National competitions highlights the performances of students in all instrument areas, including composition. The national conferences also include master classes, technology and informational sessions, pedagogy sessions, and evening concerts. Members have the opportunity to participate in the national conference by submitting proposals and papers for presentation.

=== MTNA National Conferences ===
National Conference of The Music Teachers National Association
Conference	Conference Site	Year
1st	Delaware, Ohio	1876
2nd	Chautauqua, New York	1878
3rd	Cincinnati, Ohio	1879
4th	Buffalo, New York	1880
5th	Albany, New York	1881
6th	Chicago, Illinois	1882
7th	Providence, Rhode Island	1883
8th	Cleveland, Ohio	1884
9th	New York, New York	1885
10th	Boston, Massachusetts	1886
11th	Indianapolis, Indiana	1887
12th	Chicago, Illinois	1888
13th	Philadelphia, Pennsylvania	1889
14th	Detroit, Michigan	1890
15th	Cleveland, Ohio	1892
16th	Chicago, Illinois	1893
17th	Saratoga Springs, New York	1894
18th	St. Louis, Missouri	1895
19th	Denver, Colorado	1896
20th	New York, New York	1897
21st	New York, New York	1898
22nd	Cincinnati, Ohio	1899
23rd	Des Moines, Iowa	1900
24th	Put-in-Bay, Ohio	1901
25th	Put-in-Bay, Ohio	1902
26th	Asheville, North Carolina	1903
27th	St. Louis, Missouri	1904
28th	New York, New York	1905
29th	Oberlin, Ohio	1906
30th	New York, New York	1907
31st	Washington, D.C.	1908
32nd	Evanston, Illinois	1909
33rd	Boston, Massachusetts	1910
34th	Ann Arbor, Michigan	1911
35th	Poughkeepsie, New York	1912
36th	Cincinnati, Ohio	1913
37th	Pittsburgh, Pennsylvania	1914
38th	Buffalo, New York	1915
39th	New York, New York	1916
40th	New Orleans, Louisiana	1917
41st	St. Louis, Missouri	1918
42nd	Philadelphia, Pennsylvania	1919
43rd	Chicago, Illinois	1920
44th	Detroit, Michigan	1921
45th	New York, New York	1922
46th	Pittsburgh, Pennsylvania	1923
47th	St. Louis, Missouri	1924
48th	Dayton, Ohio	1925
49th	Rochester, New York	1926
50th	Minneapolis, Minnesota	1927
51st	Cleveland, Ohio	1928
52nd	Cleveland, Ohio	1929
53rd	St. Louis, Missouri	1930
54th	Detroit, Michigan	1931
55th	Washington, D.C.	1932
56th	Lincoln, Nebraska	1933
57th	Milwaukee, Wisconsin	1934
58th	Philadelphia, Pennsylvania	1935
59th	Chicago, Illinois	1936
60th	Pittsburgh, Pennsylvania	1937
61st	Washington, D.C.	1938
62nd	Kansas City, Missouri	1939
63rd	Cleveland, Ohio	1940
64th	Minneapolis, Minnesota	1941
65th	Cincinnati, Ohio	1942
66th	Cincinnati, Ohio	1944
67th	Detroit, Michigan	1945
68th	Detroit, Michigan	1946
69th	St. Louis, Missouri	1947
70th	Boston, Massachusetts	1947
71st	Chicago, Illinois	1948
72nd	San Francisco, California	1949
73rd	Cleveland, Ohio	1950
74th	Washington, D.C.	1950
75th	Dallas, Texas	1952
76th	Cincinnati, Ohio	1953
77th	St. Louis, Missouri	1955
78th	Chicago, Illinois	1957
79th	Kansas City, Missouri	1959
80th	Philadelphia, Pennsylvania	1961
81st	Chicago, Illinois	1963
82nd	Dallas, Texas	1965
83rd	St. Louis, Missouri	1967
84th	Cincinnati, Ohio	1969
85th	Miami Beach, Florida	1970
86th	Chicago, Illinois	1971
88th	Portland, Oregon	1972
89th	Philadelphia, Pennsylvania	1973
90th	Los Angeles, California	1974
91st	Denver, Colorado	1975
92nd	Dallas, Texas	1976
93rd	Atlanta, Georgia	1977
94th	Chicago, Illinois	1978
95th	Seattle, Washington	1979
96th	Washington, D.C.	1980
97th	Phoenix, Arizona	1981
98th	Kansas City, Missouri	1982
99th	Houston, Texas	1983
100th	Louisville, Kentucky	1984
101st	Dearborn, Michigan	1985
102nd	Portland, Oregon	1986
103rd	New York, New York	1987
104th	Salt Lake City, Utah	1988
105th	Wichita, Kansas	1989
106th	Little Rock, Arkansas	1990
107th	Miami, Florida	1991
108th	Milwaukee, Wisconsin	1992
109th	Spokane, Washington	1993
110th	Washington, D.C.	1994
111th	Albuquerque, New Mexico	1995
112th	Kansas City, Missouri	1996
113th	Dallas, Texas	1997
114th	Nashville, Tennessee	1998
115th	Los Angeles, California	1999
116th	Minneapolis, Minnesota	2000
117th	Washington, D.C.	2001
118th	Cincinnati, Ohio	2002
119th	Salt Lake City, Utah	2003
120th	Kansas City, Missouri	2004
121st	Seattle, Washington	2005
122nd	Austin, Texas	2006
123rd	Toronto, Ontario	2007
124th	Denver, Colorado	2008
125th	Atlanta, Georgia	2009
126th	Albuquerque, New Mexico	2010
127th	Milwaukee, Wisconsin	2011
128th	New York, New York	2012
129th	Anaheim, California	2013
130th	Chicago, Illinois	2014
131st	Las Vegas, Nevada	2015
132nd	San Antonio, Texas	2016
133rd	Baltimore, Maryland	2017
134th	Orlando, Florida	2018
135th	Spokane, Washington	2019
136th	Chicago, Illinois (virtual)	2020
137th	Atlanta, Georgia (virtual)	2021
138th	Minneapolis, Minnesota (virtual)	2022
139th	Reno, Nevada	2023
140th	Atlanta, Georgia	2024
141st	Minneapolis, Minnesota	2025

=== MTNA Presidents ===
Presidents of The Music Teachers National Association
Name	Home State	Year(s)
Eben Tourjee	Massachusetts	1876
James A. Butterfield	Illinois	1878
Rudolf de Roode	Kentucky	1879
Fenelon B. Rice	Ohio	1880 - 1881
Arthur Mees	Ohio	1882
Edward Morris Bowman	New York	1883 - 1884
Smith N. Penfield	New York	1885
Albert A. Stanley	Rhode Island	1886
Calixa Lavallee	Massachusetts	1887
Max Leckner	Indiana	1888
William F. Heath	Illinois	1889
Albert Ross Parsons	New York	1890
Jacob H. Hahn	Michigan	1892
Edward M. Bowman	New York	1893 - 1894
N. Coe Stewart	New York	1895
Ernest R. Kroeger	Missouri	1896
Herbert W. Greene	Unknown	1897 - 1898
Max Leckner	Indiana	1899
Arnold J. Gantvoort	Ohio	1900
Arthur L. Manchester	Texas	1901 - 1902
Rosetter G. Cole	Illinois	1903
Thomas á Beckett	Pennsylvania	1904
Edward M. Bowman	New York	1905
Waldo S. Pratt	Connecticut	1906 - 1908
Rosetter G. Cole	Illinois	1909 - 1910
Peter C. Lutkin	Illinois	1911
George C. Gow	New York	1912
Charles H. Farnsworth	New York	1913 - 1914
J. Lawrence Erb	Ohio	1915 - 1917
Charles N. Boyd	Pennsylvania	1918 - 1919
Peter C. Lutkin	Illinois	1920
Osbourne McConathy	Massachusetts	1921
J. Lawrence Erb	Ohio	1922
Charles N. Boyd	Pennsylvania	1923
Leon N. Maxwell	Louisiana	1924 - 1925
Harold L. Butler	New York	1926 - 1927
William Arms Fisher	Massachusetts	1928 - 1929
Howard Hanson	New York	1930
Donald M. Swarthout	Kansas	1931 - 1932
Albert Riemenschneider	Ohio	1933
Karl W. Gehrkens	Ohio	1934
Frederick B. Stiven	Illinois	1935
Earl V. Moore	Michigan	1936 - 1937
Edwin Hughes	New York	1938 - 1939
Warren D. Allen	California	1940
Glen Haydon	North Carolina	1941 - 1942
James T. Quarles	Missouri	1944 - 1946
Russell V. Morgan	Russell V. Morgan	1947
Raymond Kendall	Michigan	1947 - 1948
Wilfred C. Bain	Indiana	1949 - 1950
Roy Underwood	Michigan	1950 - 1952
John Crowder	Montana	1953
Barrett Stout	Louisiana	1955
Karl O. Kuertsteiner	Florida	1957
Duane O. Haskell	Arkansas	1959
LaVahn Maesch	Wisconsin	1961
Duane A. Branigan	Illinois	1963
James B. Peterson	Nebraska	1965
Willis F. Ducrest	Louisiana	1967 - 1969
Celia Mae Bryant	Oklahoma	1970 - 1973
Julio Esteban	Maryland	1974 - 1975
Nadine Dresskell	Arizona	1976 - 1979
Robert V. Sutton	Massachusetts	1979 - 1981
Joseph Brye	Oregon	1981 - 1983
Frank McGinnis	California	1982 - 1985
Sigfred Matson	Mississippi	1985 - 1987
Dolores Zupan	Missouri	1987 - 1989
Richard Morris	Ohio	1989 - 1991
Margaret Lorince	South Carolina	1991 - 1993
James C. Norden	Wisconsin	1993 - 1995
Ruth Edwards	New Hampshire	1995 - 1997
L. Rexford Whiddon	Georgia	1997 - 1999
Joan M. Reist	Nebraska	1999 - 2001
R. Wayne Gibson	Georgia	2001 - 2003
Phyllis I. Pieffer	Washington	2003 - 2005
Paul B. Stewart	North Carolina	2005 - 2007
Gail Berenson	Ohio	2007 - 2009
Ann Gipson	Texas	2009 - 2011
Benjamin D. Caton	Tennessee	2011 - 2013
Kenneth J. Christensen	Montana	2013 - 2015
Rebecca Grooms Johnson	Ohio	2015 - 2017
Scott McBride Smith	Kansas	2017 - 2019
Martha Hilley	Texas	2019 - 2021
Karen Thickstun	Indiana	2021 - 2023
Peter Mack	Washington	2023 - 2025
Kevin Chance	Alabama	2025 - Present

== Divisions ==
During the Chicago convention of 1948, the MTNA Executive Committee established the divisional organizations. Each state was assigned to a particular division, even though the state in question, at the time, may not have had an organized chapter of the MTNA. The Current Divisions are as follows:

=== East Central Division ===
- Illinois
- Indiana
- Michigan
- Ohio
- Wisconsin

=== Eastern Division ===
- Connecticut
- Delaware
- District of Columbia
- Maryland
- Massachusetts
- New Hampshire
- New Jersey
- New York
- Pennsylvania
- Rhode Island
- Vermont
- West Virginia

=== Northwest Division ===
- Alaska
- Idaho
- Montana
- Oregon
- Washington
- Wyoming

=== South Central Division ===
- Arkansas
- Louisiana
- Oklahoma
- Texas

=== Southern Division ===
- Alabama
- Florida
- Georgia
- Kentucky
- Mississippi
- North Carolina
- South Carolina
- Tennessee
- Virginia

=== Southwest Division ===
- Arizona
- California
- Hawaii
- Nevada
- New Mexico
- Utah

=== West Central Division ===
- Colorado
- Iowa
- Kansas
- Minnesota
- Missouri
- Nebraska
- North Dakota
- South Dakota

== State Associations ==
All fifty states and the District of Columbia have affiliations with MTNA. Forty-nine state (forty-eight states, and the District of Columbia) music teachers associations were established between 1876 and 1969. The final two states to be established were Maine in 1976 and Alaska in 1982.

=== State Affiliates ===
Music Teachers National Association State Affiliates
State	Organization	Year Affiliated With MTNA
Alabama	AMTA	1953
Alaska	AKTA	1982
Arizona	ASMTA	1928
Arkansas	ASMTA	1920
California	CAPMT	1968
Colorado	CSMTA	1954
Connecticut	CSMTA	1965
Delaware	DSMTA	1960
District of Columbia	WMTA	1954
Florida	FSMTA	1953
Georgia	GMTA	1955
Hawaii	HMTA	1969
Idaho	IMTA	1957
Illinois	ISMTA	1886
Indiana	IMTA	1951
Iowa	IMTA	1885
Kansas	KMTA	1921
Kentucky	KMTA	1953
Louisiana	LMTA	1953
Maine	MMTA	1976
Maryland	MSMTA	1957
Massachusetts	MMTA	1960
Michigan	MMTA	1885
Minnesota	MMTA	1921
Mississippi	MMTA	1955
Missouri	MMTA	1895
Montana	MSMTA	1927
Nebraska	NMTA	1953
Nevada	NMTA	1967
New Hampshire	NHMTA	1968
New Jersey	NJMTA	1961
New Mexico	NMMTA	1951
New York	NYSMTA	1963
North Carolina	NCMTA	1960
North Dakota	NDSMTA	1957
Ohio	OMTA	1879
Oklahoma	OMTA	1952
Oregon	OMTA	1915
Pennsylvania	PMTA	1953
Rhode Island	RIMTA	1963
South Carolina	SCMTA	1961
South Dakota	SDMTA	1955
Tennessee	TMTA	1953
Texas	TMTA	1952
Utah	UMTA	1957
Vermont	VMTA	1965
Virginia	VMTA	1965
Washington	WSMTA	1915
West Virginia	WVMTA	1966
Wisconsin	WMTA	1951
Wyoming	WMTA	1963
