= Whitney Eugene Thayer =

American musician

Whitney Eugene Thayer (December 11, 1838, Mendon, Massachusetts – June 27, 1889, Burlington, Vermont) was an American organist and composer.

Thayer gave his first concert just after the installation of the new organ in the Boston Music Hall in 1863. An early student of John Knowles Paine, he advanced to studied organ and counterpoint in Berlin with Carl August Haupt (who also taught Paine). After returning from Berlin he worked in Boston and later in New York City as an organist. He was also a touring virtuoso, organ teacher, and music writer.

Apart from a festive cantata and a mass, he composed numerous works for organ, art songs, and vocal quartets.
