= Henry Holden Huss =

American musician

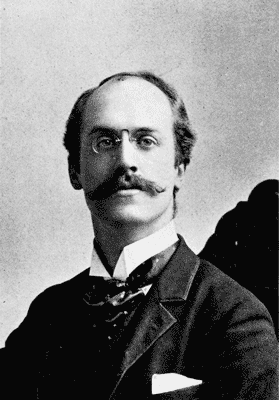
Portrait of Henry Holden Huss

Henry Holden Huss (June 21, 1862 in Newark, New Jersey – September 17, 1953 in New York City) was an American composer, pianist and music teacher. Huss grew up in New York City, the son of German immigrant parents. After studying piano and organ locally with a teacher who had trained at the Leipzig Conservatory, Huss traveled to Munich to study at the Royal Conservatory with Josef Rheinberger. His fellow students at the Royal Music School in Munich included Arthur Whiting and Horatio Parker. After graduating, he returned to the States and embarked on a career as a touring piano virtuoso. As a composer, he was regarded as one of the best of his generation by those who counted, but it was at a time when American composers could rarely get a hearing for their works.

An exhaustive study of Huss' life and music, with a complete catalog of compositions, has been published: Henry Holden Huss: An American Composer's Life, by Gary A. Greene (1995, Scarecrow Press (Metuchen NJ and London)), ISBN 0-8108-2842-1.

His niece was philosopher Helen Huss Parkhurst.

== Works ==
His 1886 Piano Trio in D minor, Op. 23, subtitled "The Munich" and dedicated to Rheinberger, was premiered with considerable acclaim and a number of other performances followed. However, the work remained unpublished until 2008 when Edition Silvertrust brought out the world premiere edition. It was edited by Skyler Silvertrust and The Rawlins Piano Trio, who in 2004 made the world premiere recording of it. Huss' String Quartet, Op. 31, dedicated to Mrs. Frederick Coolidge, was published in 1921 by G. Schirmer Inc., New York, for the Society for the Publication of American Music (S.P.A.M.). Huss was a founder of the American Guild of Organists.

The British label Hyperion released a recording of his Piano Concerto in B major, Op. 10, as part of their Romantic Piano Concerto series.
