= American art song =

The composition of art song in America began slowly in the Colonial and Federal periods, expanded greatly in the 19th century, and has become a distinguished and highly regarded addition to the classical music repertoire in the 20th and 21st centuries.

== 18th-century American art song ==
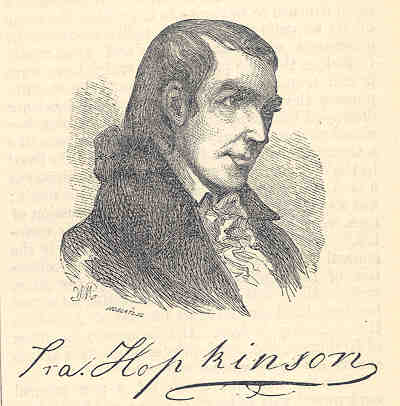
Francis Hopkinson, American patriot and composer

Francis Hopkinson (1737–1791), Philadelphia native and signer of the Declaration of Independence, is usually considered the first important American song composer. His most famous song is "My Days Have been so Wondrous Free", and his Seven Songs for the Harpsichord were composed in 1788 and dedicated to George Washington.

Other 18th-century American song composers

- Peter Von Hagen (1750–1803), Dutch born
- Alexander Reinagle (1756–1809)
- Benjamin Carr (1768–1831), English born
- Gottlieb Graupner (1767–1836), German born, arrived in the U.S. in 1795
- Oliver Shaw (1779–1848)

== 19th-century American art song ==
In the 19th century, many Americans composed songs for amateur musicians to sing at home (usually called parlor songs). In the middle of the century Stephen Foster (1826–1864) emerged as one of the best known American composers of songs. While many of his vocal pieces were written for minstrel shows, the simple but effective melodies of his "songs for the hearth and home" are widely popular, often mistaken for American folksongs.

By the end of the 19th century, serious American composers were travelling to European countries to study, especially with German and French composition teachers, and they gained a thorough understanding of Romantic style, including an understanding of the Lieder tradition. American songs written between 1870 and 1910 are often dismissed as sounding too "derivative", although the compositional craft shown in these works is quite high.

Other 19th-century American song composers

- John Hill Hewitt (1801–1890), composed songs about the Civil War
- Francis Boott (1813–1904)
- Daniel Decatur Emmett (1815–1904), composed the song "Dixie"
- George Frederick Root (1820–1895), composed popular Civil War songs
- Louis Moreau Gottschalk (1829–1869), piano virtuoso, also composed songs
- Philip Bliss (1838–1876)
- Alfred Humphreys Pease (1838–1882)
- Dudley Buck (1839–1909), organist and composer of sacred songs
- John Knowles Paine (1839–1906)
- Arthur Foote (1853–1937)
- George Whitefield Chadwick (1854–1931)
- Arthur Bird (1856–1923)
- Mary Turner Salter (1856-1938)
- George Templeton Strong (1856–1948)
- Edgar Stillman Kelley (1857–1944)
- Reginald De Koven (1859–1920), composed over 400 songs, known for "Oh promise me"
- Charles Martin Loeffler (1861–1935)
- Edward MacDowell (1861–1908)
- Carrie Jacobs-Bond (1861–1946), wrote the wedding song "I love you truly"
- Ethelbert Woodbridge Nevin (1862–1901)
- Horatio Parker (1863–1919)
- Charles Edward Ives (1874–1954)

== 20th-century American art song ==
American composers began to break from European traditions in the early part of the 20th century. Charles Ives (1874–1954) composed songs in a variety of styles, including both traditional and experimental sounds, and self-published his important collection 114 Songs. Other publications of American song, such as those in The Wa-Wan Press editions presented works by less-known American composers.

By the end of the 20th century, several composers emerged as the leaders of American art song composition, especially Aaron Copland (1900–1990), Samuel Barber (1910–1981), and Ned Rorem (1923–2022).

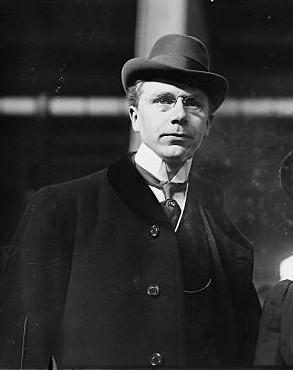
Richard Hageman, composer of film scores and many fine American art songs

Other 20th-century American art song composers

- Sidney Homer (1864–1953), husband of Louise Homer and uncle of Samuel Barber
- Jean Paul Kürsteiner (1864–1943), sacred and dramatic songs
- Harry Burleigh (1866–1949), student of Dvořák, spiritual arrangements and other songs
- Amy Beach (Mrs. H. H. A.) (1867–1944)
- Howard Brockway (1870–1951), wrote folksong arrangements with Loarine Wyman
- Arthur Farwell (1872–1952)
- Oley Speaks (1874–1948), famous for his setting of Kipling's "On the Road to Mandalay"
- Henry Clough-Leighter (1874–1956)
- Pearl G. Curran (1875–1941), 40 songs
- Frederic Ayres (1876–1926)
- John Alden Carpenter (1876–1951)
- Louis Campbell-Tipton (1877–1921)
- John Prindle Scott (1877–1932)
- Frank La Forge (1879–1953)
- Ernest Bloch (1880–1959), Swiss-American
- Clara Edwards (1880–1974), composed over 100 songs, many in anthologies
- Charles Wakefield Cadman (1881–1946), Songs of the American Indian
- Richard Hageman (1881–1966)
- Mary Howe (1882–1964)
- Bainbridge Crist (1883–1969)
- Charles Tomlinson Griffes (1884–1920)
- Wintter Watts (1884–1962), settings of Sara Teasdale
- Deems Taylor (1885–1966)
- Henry Cowell (1887–1965)
- Hall Johnson (1887–1970) concert arrangements of spirituals
- Florence Price (1887-1953)
- David W. Guion (1892–1981), collected folk songs; composed sacred songs
- John Jacob Niles (1892–1980), arranged folk songs and composed original settings of Thomas Merton poems
- Katherine K. Davis (1892–1980)
- Douglas Moore (1893–1969) opera composer, some songs
- Ernest Charles (1895–1984) a few songs still in the repertoire
- Albert Hay Malotte (1895–1964) famous setting of "Lord's Prayer"
- Leo Sowerby (1895–1968)

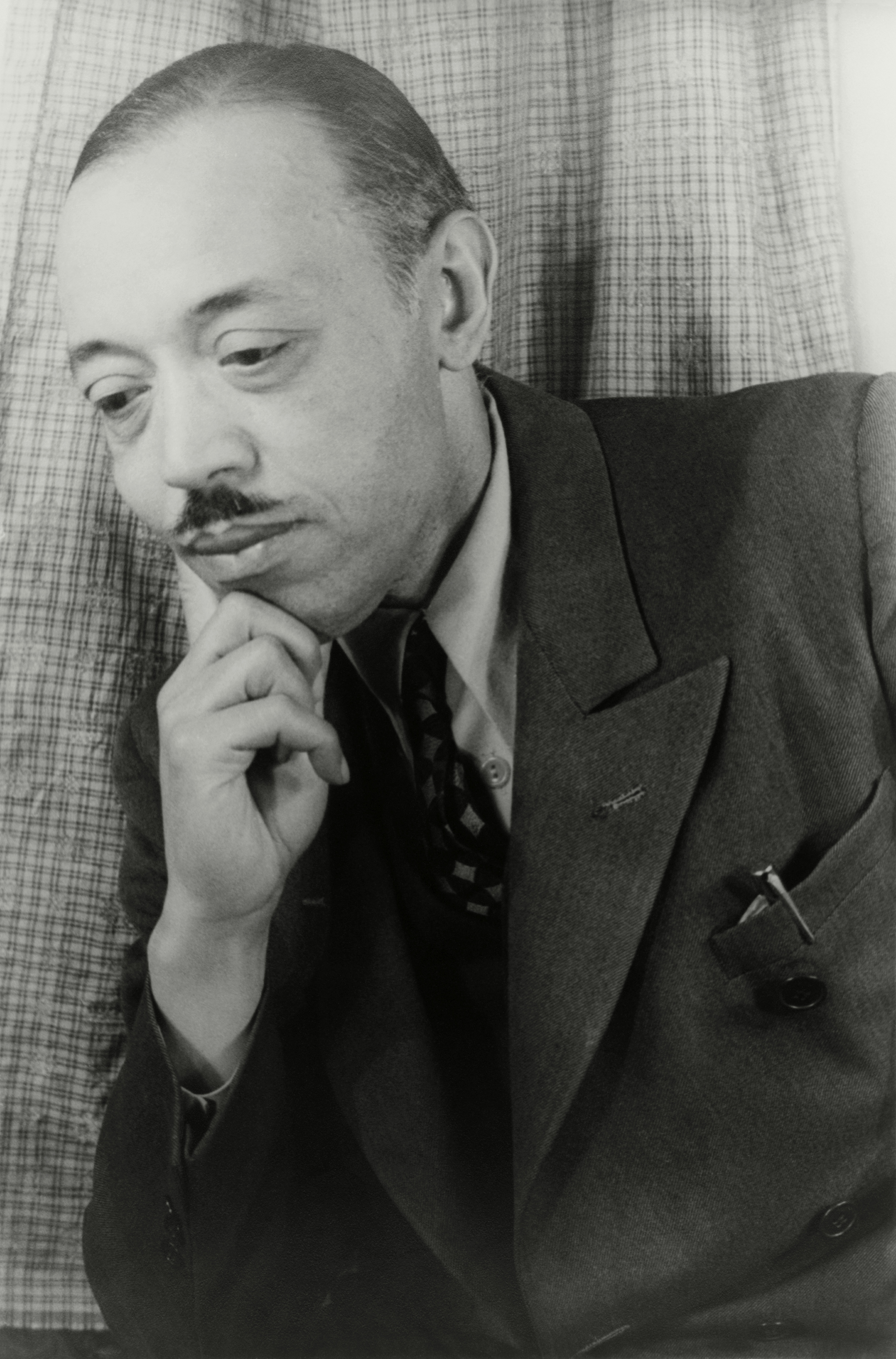
William Grant Still is known for his vocal compositions, especially opera and art songs

- William Grant Still (1895–1978) the "Dean" of African-American composers
- Roger Sessions (1896–1985)
- Virgil Thomson (1896–1987)
- Henry Cowell (1897–1965)
- Ernst Bacon (1898–1990)
- Roy Harris (1898–1979)
- John Woods Duke (1899–1984)
- Sven Lekberg (1899–1984)
- Randall Thompson (1899–1984)
- Otto Luening (1900–1996)
- Elinor Remick Warren (1900–1991)
- Ruth Crawford Seeger (1901–1953)
- Theodore Chanler (1902–1961)
- Celius Dougherty (1902–1986)
- Vittorio Giannini (1903–1966)
- Vernon Duke (1903–1969)
- Undine Smith Moore (1904–1989)
- Marc Blitzstein (1905–1964)
- Louise Talma (1906–1996)
- Paul Creston (1906–1985)
- Ross Lee Finney (1906–1997)
- Howard Swanson (1907–1978)
- Elliott Carter (born 1908), composed a few songs, from 1938 to 1943 and the 1970s
- Sergius Kagen (1908–1964)
- Jean Berger (1909–2002)
- Charles Naginski (1909–1940)
- Paul Nordoff (1909–1977)
- Elie Siegmeister (1909–1991)
- Paul Bowles (1910–1999)
- Sam Raphling (1910–1988)
- Alan Hovhaness (1911–2000)
- Gian Carlo Menotti (1911–2007)
- John Cage (1912–1992), songs include "The Wonderful Widow of 18 Springs"
- Hugo Weisgall (1912–1997)
- Margaret Bonds (1913–1972)
- Norman Dello Joio (1913–2008)
- John Edmunds (1913–1986)
- Vivian Fine (1913–2000)
- Gardner Read (1913–2005)
- Irving Fine (1914–1962)
- David Diamond (1915–2005)
- George Perle (1915–2009)
- Vincent Persichetti (1915–1987)
- Gordon Binkerd (1916–2003)
- Leonard Bernstein (1918–1990)
- George Rochberg (1918–2005)
- John La Montaine (1920–2013)
- Jack Beeson (1921–2010)
- Seymour Barab (1921–2014)
- William Bergsma (1921–1994)
- Ernest Gold (1921–1999) film music, cycle Songs of Love and Parting
- Lloyd Pfautsch (1921–2003) much sacred music, some songs
- Lukas Foss (1922–2009)
- Robert Kreutz (1922–1996)
- Richard Owen (1922–2015) lawyer, judge, and composer
- Jean Eichelberger Ivey (1923–2010)
- Daniel Pinkham (1923–2006)
- Lee Hoiby (1926–2011)
- Dominick Argento (1927–2019)
- Richard Hundley (1931–2018)
- H. Leslie Adams (born 1932)
- Luigi Zaninelli (born 1932)
- Kenneth Benshoof (born 1933)

== 21st-century American art song ==
American art song composition continues to be lively and strong in the early 21st century. Commissions from well-known singers have added a number of new works to the repertoire, and composers such as Tom Cipullo, Ricky Ian Gordon, Daron Hagen, Jake Heggie, Lori Laitman and John Musto are establishing themselves as the current generation of leading American art song composers.

Other 21st-century American art song composers

- André Previn (1929–2019)
- Robert Baksa (born 1938)
- William Bolcom (born 1938)
- John Corigliano (born 1938)
- John Harbison (born 1938)
- Thomas Pasatieri (born 1945)
- Judith Lang Zaimont (born 1945)
- Stephen Paulus (1949–2014)
- Libby Larsen (born 1950)
- Daniel Brewbaker (born 1951)
- Scott Wheeler (born 1952)
- Judith Cloud (born 1954)
- Robert Beaser (born 1954)
- David Garner (born 1954)
- David Conte (born 1955)
- Lori Laitman (born 1955)
- Larry Alan Smith (born 1955)
- Richard Danielpour (born 1956)
- James Primosch (born 1956)
- Juliana Hall (born 1958)
- Aaron Kernis (born 1960)
- Ben Moore (born 1960)
- Sarah Hutchings (born 1984)
- Alex Weiser (born 1989)

== See also ==
- English art song
