= Richard Hofmann (composer) =

German composer and music teacher (1844–1918)

Richard Hofmann (30 April 1844 – 11 November 1918) was a German composer and music teacher who worked in Leipzig.

Richard Hofmann was born in Delitzsch where his father was the municipal music director. He studied with Raimund Dreyschock (1824–1869) and Salomon Jadassohn and settled in Leipzig as a music teacher. He was Professor at Leipzig Conservatory and leader of the Leipzig Choral Society.

Hofmann composed numerous instructive pieces for piano, string and wind instruments. Among his literary works are Katechismus der Musikinstrumente (A Catechism of Musical Instruments) published in 1890, and Praktische Instrumentationslehre (Practical Instrumentation, translated by Robin Humphrey Legge) of 1893.

Notable students include George Strong, Donald Heins, Jean Paul Kürsteiner, Frank Welsman and Richard Wetz.

Hofmann died in 1918 at the age of 74.

== Selected works ==
Orchestral

- Aus der Jugendzeit for string orchestra, Op. 60

Chamber music

- 3 Sonatinas for cello and piano, Op. 42
- Sonatine für angehende Spieler (Sonatina for Advancing Players) in F major for viola (or flute) and piano, Op. 46 (1885)
- 2 leicht ausführbare Sonatinen (2 Easy Sonatinas) for oboe (or violin) and piano, Op. 47
- 2 Sonatinas for clarinet (or violin) and piano, Op. 48
- 3 Sonatinas for violin and piano, Op. 49
- 2 Sonatinas for violin and piano, Op. 57
- Leichte Sonate (Easy Sonata) for violin and piano, Op. 61
- Bagatellen for violin and piano, Op. 62
- Serenade for piano trio, Op. 73
- 4 Stücke (4 Pieces) for oboe and piano, Op. 81
- 5 Stücke (5 Pieces) for violin and cello, Op. 83
- Quartett für vier Violinen (Quartet for Four Violins), Op. 98
- 8 Vortragsstücke (8 Concert Pieces) for violin and piano, Op. 103
- 6 Stücke (6 Pieces) for violin and piano, Op. 105
- Trio in G major for 2 violins and viola, Op. 112
- 3 Stücke (3 Pieces) for violin and piano, Op. 118
- 4 Vortragsstücke (4 Concert Pieces) for violin and piano, Op. 119

Piano

- Heitere Gedanken, 4 Pieces, Op. 8
- Tarantelle, Op. 9
- Blätter und Blüten, 6 Pieces, Op. 10
- 3 Sonatinas, Op. 34
- 4 Charakterstücke (4 Character Pieces), Op. 88
- 2 Stücke in Tanzform (2 Pieces in Dance Form), Op. 89

Vocal

- 4 Lieder for voice and piano, Op. 37

== Discography ==
- Richard Hofmann: 15 Studies Op.87 for Viola - Marco Misciagna - Label: MM - MM02 - 2024
