= Alfred Pease =

Alfred Pease may refer to:

- Alfred Pease (musician) (1838–1882), American musician
- Sir Alfred Pease, 2nd Baronet (1857–1939), British politician

== See also ==
- Alfred Pearse, cartoonist and campaigner
