= String Quartet in C minor =

String Quartet in C minor may refer to:

- String Quartet No. 4 (Beethoven)
- Quartettsatz, D 103 (Schubert)
- Quartettsatz, D 703 (Schubert)
- String Quartet (Bruckner)
- String Quartet (Jadassohn)
- String Quartet No. 1 (Brahms)
- String Quartet No. 4 (Oswald)
- String Quartet (Chausson)
- String Quartet No. 4 (Hill)
- String Quartet No. 8 (Shostakovich)
