= Ernest Charles =

American composer (1895–1984)

- Born: November 21, 1895; Minneapolis, Minnesota
- Died: April 16, 1984 (aged 88) Beverly Hills, California
- Occupation: Composer
- Instrument: Voice
- Years active: 1932–1950

Ernest Charles (Minneapolis, Minnesota, November 21, 1895 – Beverly Hills, California, April 16, 1984) was an American composer of art songs.

== Life and musical career ==
Charles was born in Minnesota with the surname Grosskopf. He attended The University of Southern California as a college student and studied singing with Charles Modini Wood. He eventually went to New York City, changed his surname to Charles, and began his professional life as a singer, performing in vaudeville and Broadway reviews, including Earl Carroll's Vanities in 1928 and the George White Scandals in 1929. His songs became widely known after 1932, when John Charles Thomas performed his song Clouds in a New York recital. Following that success, he continued to compose songs regularly until about 1950. At that time he lived with his wife, a mezzo-soprano, in New York City, and produced the radio program Great Moments in Music. He returned to California in 1953, settling in Beverly Hills, where he spent the remaining years of his life.

He was selected as a National Patron of Delta Omicron, an international professional music fraternity. He was a member of Phi Mu Alpha, an honorary member of the Apollo Club of Minneapolis, and a fellow of the California-based American Institute of Fine Arts. He joined ASCAP in 1934, and served as an Assistant Executive Secretary of the American Guild of Musical Artists (AGMA) from 1937 until at least 1966.

== Musical works ==
Charles composed around 45 songs for voice and piano in the years between 1930 and 1950. Most were published individually by G. Schirmer, and a few have been reissued in various song anthologies and collections of American art songs from the same publisher. The songs are known for their rubato, sweeping vocal lines, sumptuous melodies, and ingenuous charm. Two of his songs are popular encores: the Viennese Waltz Let My Song Fill Your Heart, made famous by Eileen Farrell; and When I Have Sung My Songs, recorded by such singers as Kirsten Flagstad, Rosa Ponselle, and Thomas Hampson, and featured in the closing credits of the 2016 film Florence Foster Jenkins, sung by lead actress Meryl Streep.

== Published songs ==
published by G. Schirmer unless otherwise noted

- Always You, 1936
- And So, Goodbye (E. Charles), 1938
- Bon Voyage (Velma Hitchcock), 1939
- Carmé (Neapolitan Song), arr., 1938
- Clouds, 1932
- Crescent Moon, 1939
- Dawn (E. Charles), Boston Music, 1933
- Disenchantment (Mona Bonelli), 1940
- L'Envoi (Sarojini Naidu), 1935
- The Harp Aline Kilmer, 1936
- The House on the Hill (E. Charles), 1933
- Hymn to the United States Navy (Foster G. Carling), 1943
- If You Only Knew (G. Johnston-Jervis), 1935
- Incline Thine Ear (Isaiah 55: 3, 1), 1948
- Let My Song Fill Your Heart ("Viennese Waltz"), 1936
- Little Green Gate to Heaven (Fred Meadows), Chappell-Harms, 1933
- Lord of the Years (Velma Hitchcock), 1938
- Love (William Bruno), 1941
- Love is of God (John 4:7-8), 1949
- Message (Sara Teasdale)
- My Lady Walks in Loveliness (Mona Modini Wood), 1932
- Night (Sydney King Russell), 1944
- Oh Little River (Earl Benham), 1946
- O Lovely World (Velma Hitchcock), 1947
- Over the Land is April (Robert Louis Stevenson), Willis Music, 1937
- Over the Wall of My Garden (William Bruno), Chappell & Co., 1929
- Parting (William Bruno), Irving Berlin Standard Music Corporation, 1929
- Psalm XXIII (Psalm 23), Ecco Music, Beverly Hills, California, 1956
- Psalm of Exaltation (Psalm 27), 1951
- Remembrance (Dorothy Tete), 1949
- Romany Honeymoon (R. Atwater), Boston Music Co., 1933
- Save Me, God (Psalm 69), 1947
- Someone (E. Charles), 1937
- Speak Not in Haste (Velma Hitchcock), 1936
- The Spendthrift (Sarojini Naidu), 1935
- Stampede, 1937
- The Sussex Sailor (Alfred Noyes), 1933
- Sweet Song of Long Ago (E. Charles), 1933
- Take the Knocks, Lad (William Bruno), 1957
- When I Have Sung My Songs, 1934
- The White Swan, 1941
- A Wish (Anita McLean Willison), 1936
- Who Keeps the Years (E. Olmstead), 1940
- You Are! (E. Charles), Boston Music, 1935
- Youth, 1928

== Other compositions ==
published by G. Schirmer unless otherwise noted

- Christmas Song (Robert Herrick), SATB solos, SATB chorus, organ, 1951
- Festival Jubilate, mixed voices, R. L. Huntzinger, 1937
- The Greatness of the Lord, SATB chorus, 1957
- Waltz Interlude ("in the Viennese Style"), piano solo, 1788
