= English art song =

The composition of art song in England and English-speaking countries has a long history, beginning with lute song in the late 16th century and continuing today.

== English art song in the 17th century ==
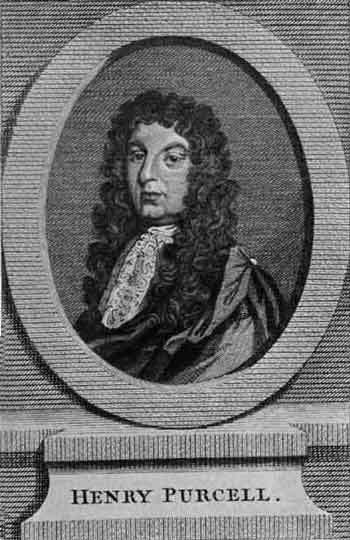
Henry Purcell

The composition of polyphonic music was at its peak in the late 16th century. By that time, however, the lute started to gain popularity, and was very successful among educated people by 1600. The Italians were trying to recapture a simpler vocal style, to mimic Greek models. Giulio Caccini and the Florentine Camerata developed the monody, for solo voice with lute accompaniment, around 1600. Caccini travelled around Europe, other countries begin developing their own solo songs with lute, especially the English composers. John Dowland (1563–1626) and Thomas Campion (1567–1620) emerged as the best-known and most respected of the composers of lute song. Later in the 17th century, Henry Purcell (1659–95) composed many solo songs for his semi-operas, and his songs are also generally considered among the best early English art songs.

Other English art song composers in the 17th century

- William Byrd (1543–1623), composed "consort songs" with viol consort accompaniment, 1588 collection of Psalms, Sonnets, and Songs
- Thomas Morley (1557–1603), his songs may have been used in Shakespeare's plays, well-known song "It was a Lover and his Lass" from his First Book of Ayres, 1607
- Michael Cavendish (c. 1565–1628), published one volume of madrigals and lute songs in 1598
- Francis Pilkington (1582–1638), lute song composer
- Robert Jones (fl. 1597–1615); 5 books of ayres, 1600–1610
- Tobias Hume (d. 1648), serious and comic songs
- Philip Rosseter (c. 1567–1623), prolific song composer and friend of Campion; a few of his lute songs are still performed
- Henry Lawes (1595–1662); prolific song composer, set texts by court poets (Herring, Suckling, and Carew) for his vocal works
- John Playford (1623–1686), London bookseller, publisher, and minor composer
- Thomas d'Urfey (1653–1723), prolific song composer, playwright, and poet

== English art song in the 18th century ==
As Italian opera composition developed in the later 17th century, recitative and aria began to split apart as separate parts of solo vocal music. Four types of vocal music began to blossom in the 18th century: church music, early oratorio (esp. with Carissimi in Italy), opera, and the secular (or "chamber") cantata. In the early 18th century, George Frideric Handel (1685–1759) made Italian opera very popular in London, but The Beggar's Opera in 1729, a parody of Handel's Italian operas, created a new fad for English popular opera, and Italian opera in London faded by 1740. Thus, the two important types of English solo vocal music in the mid 18th century are oratorios by Handel, and "pastiche operas" or "ballad operas" from Arne, Boyce and other English composers. The publication of solo vocal music (songs often called "canzonets" or "canzonettas") with English texts at the end of the 18th century helped to establish the art song genre in subsequent years.

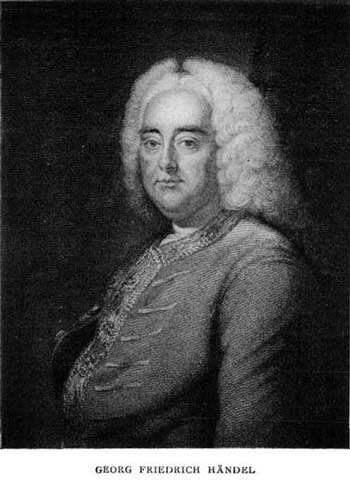
George Frideric Handel

English art song composers in the 18th century

- William Croft (c. 1678–1727), sacred songs
- Henry Carey (c. 1687–1743), writer and prolific song composer
- Thomas Arne (1710-1778), prolific song composer
- Carl Friedrich Abel (1723–87), German born but moved to London, composed symphonies, quartets, and a few vocal pieces
- Thomas Linley the elder (1733–95), composed English ballads and theater music
- Johann Christian Bach (1735–82), J. S. Bach's youngest son, called "the London Bach," was a friend to the young Mozart, composed Italian operas in London like Handel 50 years earlier
- William Jackson (1730–1803), lived in western England, his Op. 9 2-part canzonets were published in 1770
- Samuel Arnold (1740–1802), primarily a theatre composer, but published a book of solo songs, Op. 13, in 1778
- Johann Peter Salomon (1745–1815), German-born violinist, composer and impresario, published two books of canzonets, in 1805 and 1807, brought Joseph Haydn to London
- James Hook (1746–1827), composed keyboard works and songs, as well as one oratorio
- Sir John Andrew Stevenson (1761-1833), a prolific Irish composer, known for his work with Thomas Moore
- Stephen Storace (1762–96), half Italian, knew Mozart, composed for the theater
- George Frederick Pinto (1785–1806), a child prodigy, he composed piano works and songs, his canzonets were published in 1804

== English art song in the 19th century ==
London was the largest city in Europe by 1800; many non-English composers traveled there, especially from Germany and Italy. English theater works ("ballad operas") continued to be popular into the 19th century. The harpsichord, fortepiano, harp, and guitar were all popular instruments at the time; all were used to accompany voices and as solo instruments; song composition began to flourish as home music making with these instrument increased. In the 19th century almost everyone sang, in choral societies, at church services, and at home (in the 'drawing room'). Popular songs, called ballads, became the standard for vocal music publishing later in the 19th century, creating a "low point" in British music composition. Famous singers performed these ballads in concerts, paid for by music publishers, so that the songs would gain popularity and sell copies. In contrast, serious British composers late in the 19th century look towards Germany for inspiration and support.

Joseph Haydn

Primary English art song composers in the early 19th century

- William Shield (1748–1829), made famous the song "Auld Lang Syne"
- Sir Henry Bishop (1786–1855), composed the famous song "Home Sweet Home"
- Joseph Haydn (1732–1809), late in his life he found a new fame in London, esp. in symphony and oratorio; published 2 sets of English Canzonets in 1794 and 1795 written by Anne Hunter

Primary English art song composers in the mid- to late 19th century

- Arthur Sullivan (1842–1900), composed a few art songs, "The Lost Chord" was an extremely popular ballad in its day
- Charles Hubert Parry (1848–1918), his twelve sets of songs, settings of Shakespeare and other important English poets, called "English Lyrics" are an important contribution to the song genre; influenced by German Lieder
- Edward Elgar (1857–1934), known for his important orchestral and choral works, but he wrote a few songs as well; his 1899 song cycle Sea Pictures for voice and orchestra set a high standard for English song
- Frederick Delius (1862–1934)

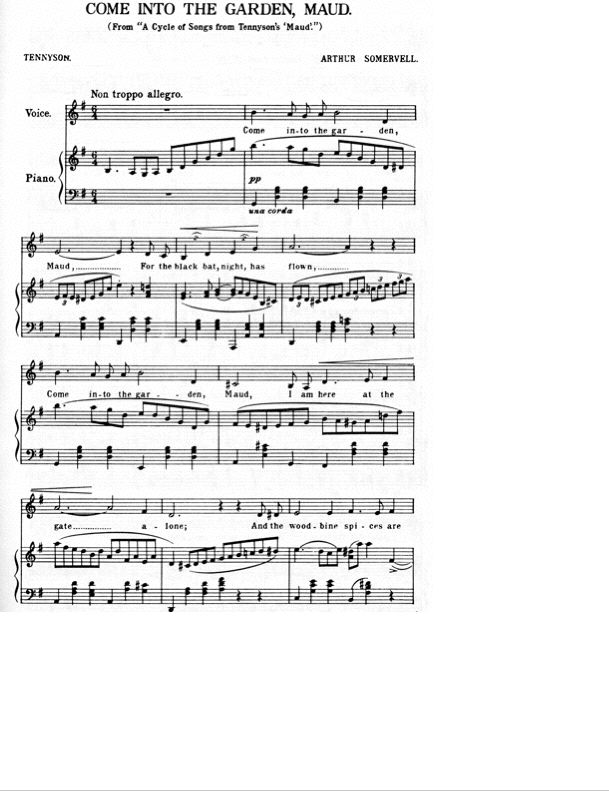
The opening measures of Arthur Somervell's "Come Into the Garden, Maud"

Other English art song composers in the mid- to late 19th century

- Charles Villiers Stanford (1852–1924), Irish born, his many songs show a German influence
- Maude Valérie White (1855–1937), perhaps the first important female composer in England, she composed chiefly songs
- Dame Ethel Smyth (1858–1944), a few of her songs are published
- Liza Lehmann (1862–1918), was German born, but settled in England, she is best known for her cycle "In a Persian Garden" for four voices and piano
- Edward German (1862–1936), wrote operettas like Gilbert & Sullivan, a few of his songs are still in the repertoire from publication in anthologies
- Arthur Somervell (1863–1937), used some folksong elements in his compositions, he is best known for his "Maud" and "A Shropshire Lad" cycles
- Charles Wood (1866–1926), Irish-born composer and church musician, wrote many songs including a setting of Walt Whitman's "Ethiopia Saluting the Colours"
- Granville Bantock (1868–1946), published six volumes of "Songs of the East" on verses of Asian poets, mostly forgotten today
- Henry Walford Davies (1869–1941), most of his songs are rarely heard today

== English art song in the 20th century ==
The great success of European Romantic composers encouraged a "Renaissance" of English music, especially vocal music. Interest in British folk music was expanded through the work of Cecil Sharp, Ralph Vaughan Williams and others; it gradually becomes incorporated into British "classical" music. The highest point of the English musical "Renaissance" began around 1900, and many great art songs were composed in England before the First World War. A second great era for song composition occurred between the wars, in the years 1920-1938.

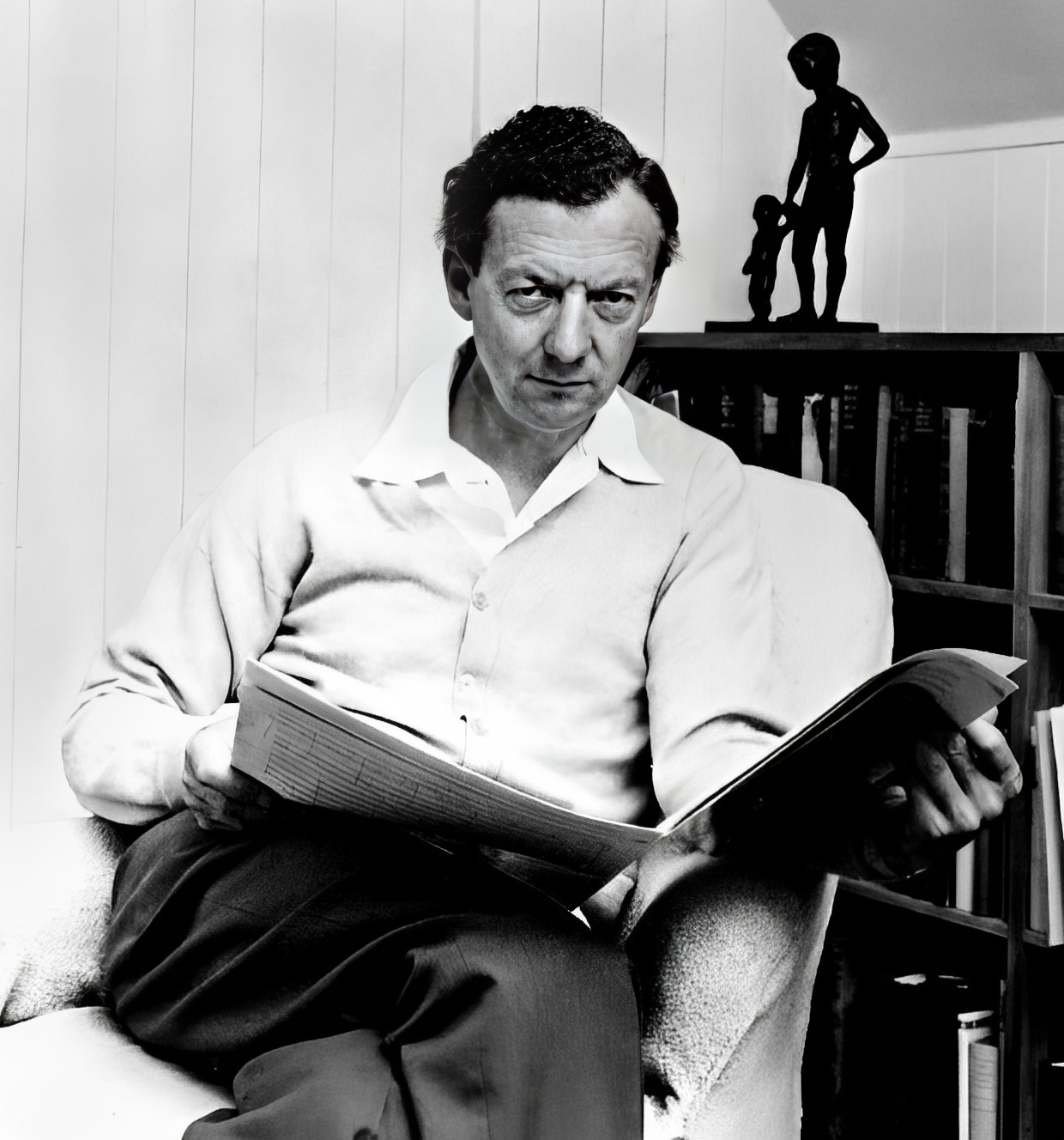
Benjamin Britten

Primary English art song composers in the 20th century

- Ralph Vaughan Williams (1872–1958)
- Roger Quilter (1877–1953)
- Frank Bridge (1879–1941)
- John Ireland (1879–1962)
- Arnold Bax (1883–1953)
- George Butterworth (1885–1916)
- Ivor Gurney (1890–1937)
- Herbert Howells (1892–1983)
- Peter Warlock (1894–1930)
- Michael Head (1900–76)
- Eric Thiman (1900–75)
- Gerald Finzi (1901–56)
- Benjamin Britten (1913–76)
- William Walton (1902–83)
- Donald Swann (1923–94)

Other English art song composers in the 20th century

- Cyril Rootham (1875–1938), teacher to Cecil Armstrong Gibbs and Arthur Bliss; composed over 60 songs, also sacred pieces, chamber music, choral and orchestral works
- Thomas Dunhill (1877-1946), in 1902 composed the earliest known song setting of poetry by W. B. Yeats, included in his cycle The Wind Among the Reeds (1904)
- Ernest Farrar (1885–1918), killed in World War I; Gerald Finzi's teacher, composed 15 songs
- Bernard van Dieren (1887–1936), his music moved towards 20th century serialism; composed about 35 songs in English
- William Denis Browne (1888–1915), schoolteacher, music critic, and composer; killed in World War I, completed 11 songs
- Cecil Armstrong Gibbs (1889–1960); composed about 160 songs, many settings of texts by his friend Walter de la Mare
- Arthur Bliss (1891–1975), composed about 60 songs, much great orchestral and chamber music
- Benjamin Burrows (1891–1966), teacher, composer, and music typographer; composed over 100 songs, 93 for his soprano friend Jane Vowles; settings of Housman, Rossetti, Herrick, de la Mare, Afro-American Spirituals, Robert Frost, and Emily Dickinson
- Alec Rowley (1892–1958), composer, pianist, and organist
- Charles Wilfred Orr (1893–1976); 35 songs, mostly settings of Housman
- Arthur Benjamin (1893–1960), raised in Australia but moved to London
- Eugene Goossens (1893–1962), a conductor and composer, wrote a few art songs
- Ernest John Moeran (1894–1950), studied with John Ireland, Irish influences are in his songs
- Patrick Hadley (1899–1973), composed 10 songs and chamber vocal works
- Alan Bush (1900–95), composed 30 art songs
- Edmund Rubbra (1901–1986), composed both art songs and vocal works with orchestra
- Victor Hely-Hutchinson (1901–47), composed quite a few songs, but most are rarely performed
- Lennox Berkeley (1903–1989), composed many songs
- Constant Lambert (1905–1951), composed only a few art songs
- William Alwyn (1905–85), composed several song cycles in the 1970s
- Alan Rawsthorne (1905–1971), composed 11 published songs
- Michael Tippett (1905–1998), well known as an opera composer, but only wrote a few songs and vocal works with orchestra
- John Raynor (1909–1970) more than 680 works, mostly songs for soprano or tenor; also sacred pieces, including carols and a Mass setting; 19 of his works have been published.
- John Sykes (1909–1962), wrote about 30 songs, especially settings of Blake and Swingler
- Mervyn Horder (1910–1997), composed about 90 songs, neoromantic, great variety of texts
- Robert Still (1910–1971), composed about 20 songs, setting texts by a variety of famous poets
- Geoffrey Bush (1920–1998), song settings from Shakespeare to contemporary poetry
- Madeleine Dring (1923–1977), over 60 songs, eclectic music style
- Trevor Hold (1939-2004), a series of song cycles, many setting his own texts
- David Dubery (1948-), many songs from Shakespeare, Robert Graves, Douglas Gibson, Hilaire Belloc, Walter de la Mare, Thomas Hardy, R. L. Stevenson and Pam Zinnemann-Hope.

There have been two notable book length studies of English art song in the 20th Century. Stephen Banfield's comprehensive, two volume study of early twentieth century English song, first published in 1985, is notable for its incorporation of both literary and musical scholarship alongside a performance perspective. Towards the end of his life composer Trevor Hold published his full length study of English Romantic song, Parry To Finzi: 20 English Song Composers (2002).

== English art song in the 21st century ==
Art song composition continues to thrive today, and many English composers are using the internet to show their pieces to the world. While the tradition continues, no current composers have yet achieved the highest level of success and acclaim, making modern British art song "a sleeping giant awaiting another resurgence."

English art song composers active in the 21st century

- Peter Dickinson (b. 1934), settings of Auden, Alan Porter, Dylan Thomas, e. e. cummings
- Nicholas Maw (1936-2009), a neo-Romantic, he published several song cycles
- Robin Holloway (b. 1943), prolific song composer, nearly 100 songs
- Betty Roe (b. 1930), composer of over 300 songs including settings of Charles Causley, Emily Dickinson and Marian Lines.
- Stephen Brown (b. 1948), three song cycles, Chinese Love Lyrics and Shadow of a Leaf are settings of Chinese poems, Where the Geese Go Barefoot sets Mother Goose tongue twisters
- Ian Venables (b. 1955), English composer, many songs and song cycles
- James MacMillan (b. 1959), Scottish composers, many song cycles

== See also ==
- Song
- Art song
- American art song
- Music of the United Kingdom
