= Alexander Dreyschock =

Czech pianist and composer (1818–1869)

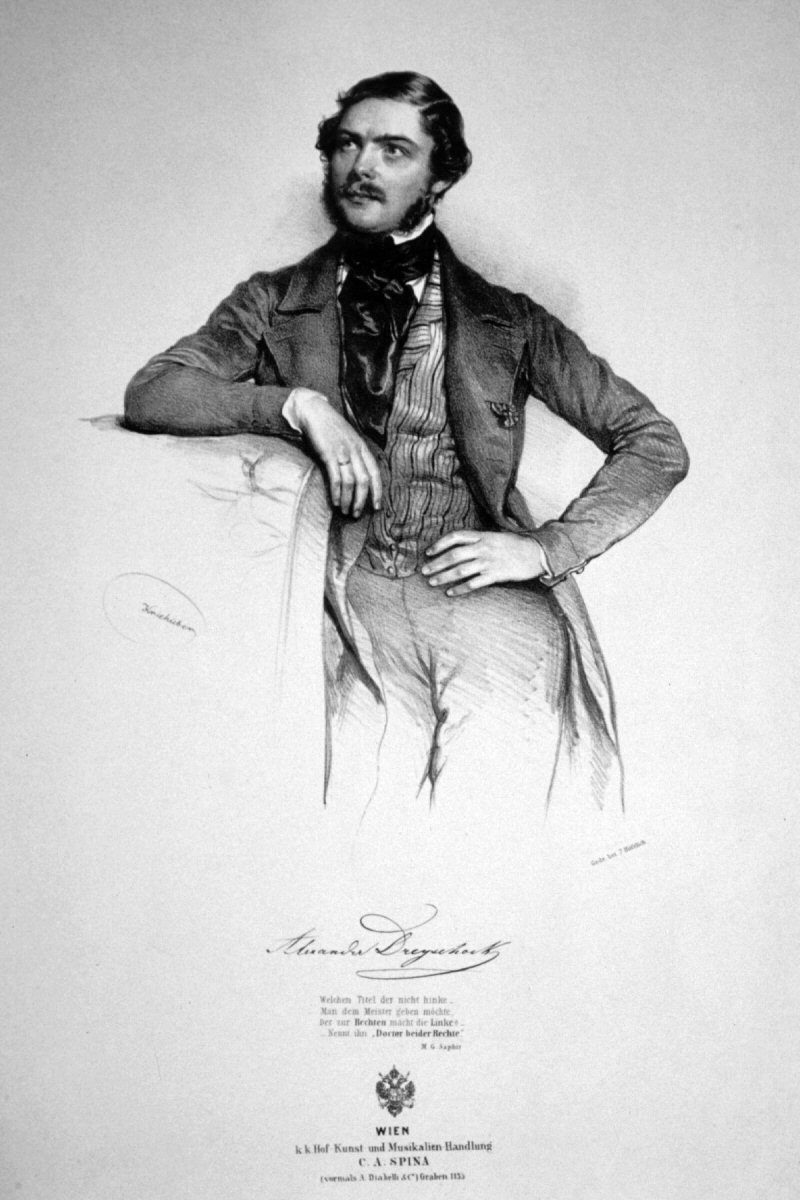
Alexander Dreyschock was famous for playing the left-hand arpeggios of Chopin's Revolutionary Étude in octaves, at every concert.

Alexander Dreyschock (15 October 1818 – 1 April 1869) was a Czech pianist and composer. He was the brother of Raimund Dreyschock and the uncle of Felix Dreyschock.

== Life and career ==
Born in Žáky in Bohemia, his musical talents were first noticed aged eight, and at age 15 he travelled to Prague to study piano and composition with Václav Tomášek. By the age of twenty, Dreyschock undertook his first professional tour in December 1838, performing in various northern and central towns in Germany.

Subsequent tours saw him visiting Russia (1840–42), Paris (spring 1843), London, the Netherlands, Austria and Hungary (1846), as well as Denmark and Sweden in 1849. Elsewhere he caused a sensation with prodigious execution of thirds, sixths, and octaves, plus other tricks. When he made his Paris debut in 1843 he included a piece for the left hand alone. Dreyschock's left hand was renowned, and his most famous technical stunt was to play the left-hand arpeggios of Chopin's Revolutionary Étude in octaves. Observers of the time reported that he played it in correct tempo, and it is known that he programmed it in all of his recitals. Johann Baptist Cramer, who heard Dreyschock play in Paris, exclaimed: "The man has no left hand! here are two right hands!" Edward Dannreuther remarked: "Dreyschock was the hero of octaves, sixths, and thirds, his execution the non plus ultra of mechanical training." He traveled to Weimar and Kassel in 1858 to visit Franz Liszt and Louis Spohr, however, his visit was not mentioned in Spohr's records.

In 1862, Dreyschock became a staff member at the newly founded St. Petersburg Conservatory at Anton Rubinstein's invitation. His students included Arkady Abaza. He was appointed Court Pianist to the Tsar as well as Director of the Imperial School of Music for the Operatic Stage. Whilst he maintained this double post for six years, his health suffered from the Russian climate. He moved to Italy in 1868, but the change of residence did him little good, and he died of tuberculosis, aged fifty, in Venice. At the wish of his family he was buried at the Olšany Cemetery in Prague.

== Compositions ==
Dreyschock's compositions were not particularly successful. Many of his piano pieces were criticized as appealing and brilliant yet lacking in depth. His variations on God Save the Queen was quite well-known.
