= Effort, Pennsylvania =

Unincorporated community in Pennsylvania, US

- Census-designated place
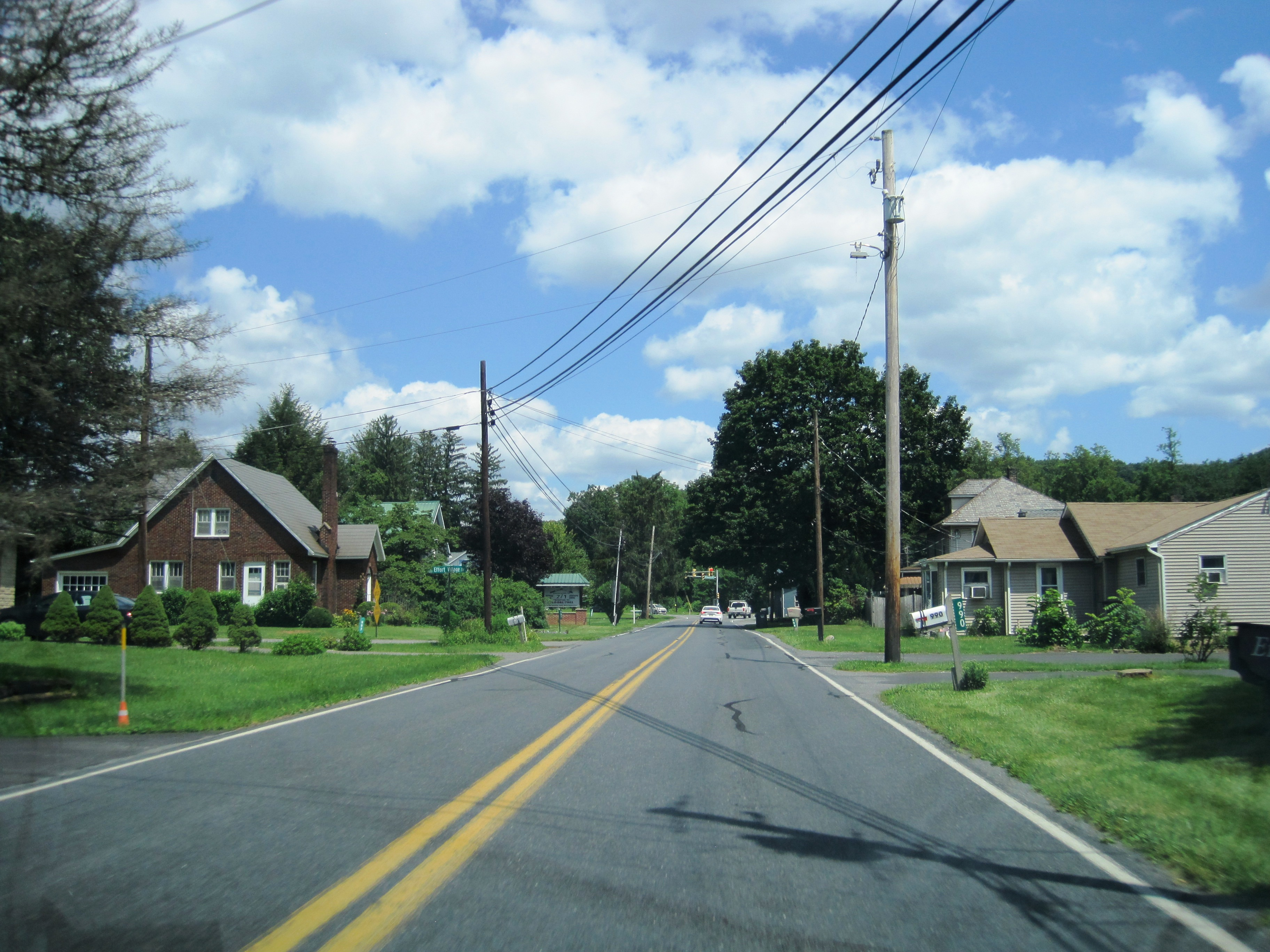
- Village of Effort along Gilbert Road

- Location within Pennsylvania Location within the United States
- Coordinates: 40°56′21″N 75°26′06″W
- Country: United States
- State: Pennsylvania
- County: Monroe
- Township: Chestnuthill

Area
  - Total: 5.06 sq mi (13.10 km^{2})
  - Land: 5.05 sq mi (13.07 km^{2})
  - Water: 0.012 sq mi (0.03 km^{2})
- Elevation: 778 ft (237 m)

Population (2020)
  - Total: 1,965
  - Density: 389.3/sq mi (150.31/km^{2})
- Time zone: UTC-5 (Eastern (EST))
  - Summer (DST): UTC-4 (EDT)
- ZIP code: 18330
- Area code(s): 570
- GNIS feature ID: 1174036

Effort, also known as Mount Effort, is a census-designated place and unincorporated community in Chestnuthill Township, Monroe County, Pennsylvania, United States. Effort is located along Pennsylvania Route 115 2.5 miles (4.0 km) northwest of Brodheadsville. Effort has a post office with ZIP code 18330. As of the 2010 census, its population was 2,269.

A post office called Effort has been in operation since 1850. According to tradition, the community was named for the considerable "effort" it took townspeople to agree on a name for the place.

== Demographics ==
=== 2020 Decennial Census ===
At the time of the census, Effort had a population of 1,965.

Historical population
Census	Pop.	Note	%±
2020	1,965		—
U.S. Decennial Census

== Education ==
It is in the Pleasant Valley School District.

== Notable people ==
- Celius Dougherty, pianist and composer
