= Charles Naginski =

American composer

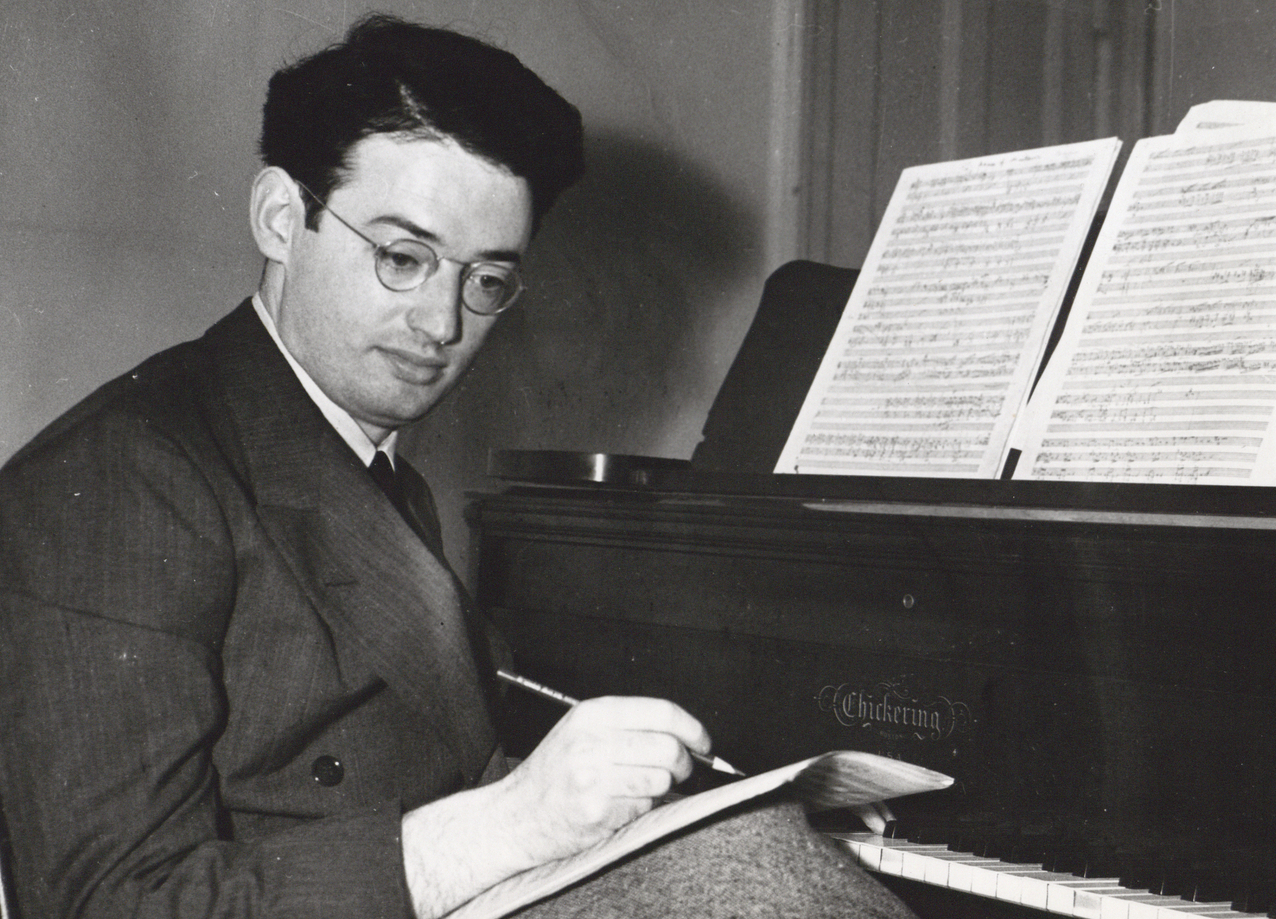

Charles Naginski (Cairo, Egypt, May 29, 1909 – Lenox, Massachusetts, August 4, 1940) was an American composer of art songs and other musical works.

== Biography ==
Charles Naginski was the son of Russian Jewish parents. His father, who was his first piano teacher, recognized his talent for music and composition at a very early age. From 1928 to 1933 Naginski held a fellowship at the Juilliard Graduate School as a pupil of Rubin Goldmark. Other students there at the time included composers Paul Nordoff, Sergius Kagen, Celius Dougherty, and Vittorio Giannini. One of his other Juilliard colleagues, George Newton, reported that he "spoke five languages, including English, all equally badly." As a result, the Juilliard dean asked Newton to help Naginski with his English, so the two traded lessons in English grammar for accompanying lessons.

He also studied with Roger Sessions. Later he studied at the American Academy in Rome, winning the American Rome Prize in 1938. In the summer of 1940 he went to the Tanglewood institute to study with Paul Hindemith. He died by drowning in Lenox, Massachusetts, on August 4, 1940.

== Music ==
As a student, Naginski composed several large instrumental works and chamber music. A notable performance of his Sinfonietta was given by the chamber orchestra at Yaddo in September, 1940, as a tribute to the composer. However, his instrumental works have had few public performances in subsequent years.

His art songs are better known. Of the seven songs that were published, only his setting of The Pasture, a poem by Robert Frost has remained in the vocal repertoire, due to its publication in an anthology of American songs. All of these songs are "distinctive, fresh, and full of personality", with "arresting harmonic, melodic, and structural invention. Because the composer was a pianist, his accompaniments are inventive and colorful. Both The Pasture and Richard Cory were dedicated to the important Danish soprano Povla Frijsh, who recorded the former song in 1940.

His choices of poems by important American poets and their musical settings is remarkable and unexpected, "in a man who was not native born and spoke so many languages, was the depth of his understanding of and response to American poetry, and the force and precision with which he was able to interpret it in musical terms".

== Musical compositions ==
Instrumental works

- Orchestra suite (1931)
- Two string quartets (1933)
- Orchestra poem (1936)
- Sinfonietta (1937)
- Three Movements for chamber orchestra (1937)
- The Minotaur, ballet for orchestra (1938)
- Nocturne and Pantomime (1938)
- Five Pieces from a Children’s Suite (Boston, 1940)

Songs for voice and piano

- Look Down, Fair Moon (text by Walt Whitman), published 1942
- Mia Carlotta (text by T. A. Daly), published 1940
- Night song at Amalfi (text by Sara Teasdale), 1942
- The Pasture (text by Robert Frost), published 1940
- Richard Cory (text by Edward Arlington Robinson), published 1940
- The Ship Starting (text by Walt Whitman), published 1942
- Under the Harvest Moon (text by Carl Sandburg), published 1940

Plus unpublished and unfinished manuscripts
