= Raimund Dreyschock =

Czech violinist (1824–1869)

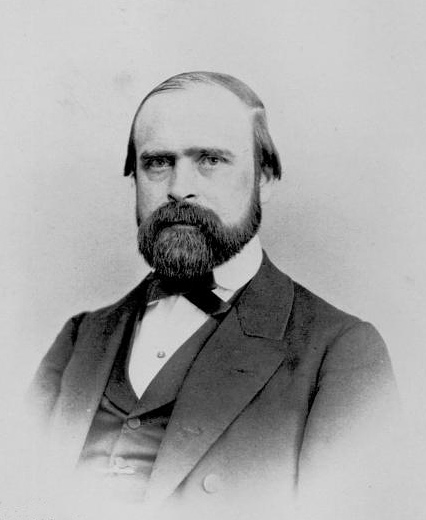
Raimund Dreyschock

Raimund Dreyschock (30 August 1824 (Note: His exact date of birth is given as 20 August or 30 August, in 1820 or 1824.) – 6 February 1869) was a Czech composer and violinist. He was the brother of Alexander Dreyschock and father of Felix Dreyschock.

== Biography ==
Raimund Dreyschock was born on 30 August 1824 in Žáky (now Czech Republic). At eleven years old his father sent him to the Prague Conservatory where he studied violin under Friedrich Wilhelm Pixis. After completing his musical studies, Dreyschock made a number of tours and moved to Leipzig in 1845. There he performed in the Gewandhaus and was offered the position of second Concertmaster in the orchestra. He accompanied his brother Alexander on some of his tours. In 1850, Dreyschock became Concertmaster in the Gewandhaus and violin teacher at the Leipzig Conservatory. He retired from performing in 1868 and died on 6 February 1869 in Stötteritz, Leipzig.

From 1851, he was married to Elizabeth (or Elisabeth) née Nose, a contralto singer also well-known in Leipzig. She founded a vocal academy in Leipzig and later moved to Berlin.

== Works ==
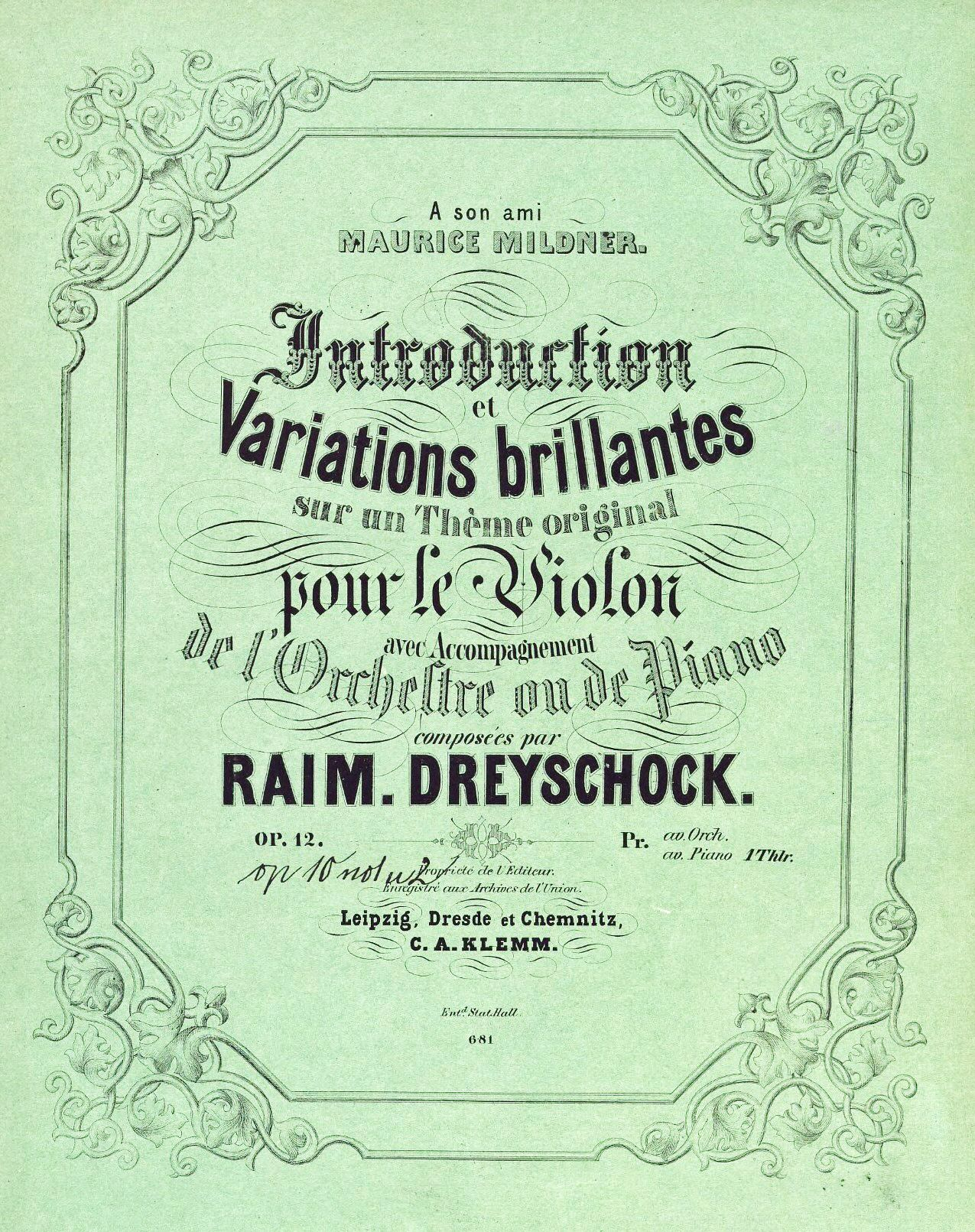
Introduction et variations brillantes by Raimund Dreyschock, title page

Dreyschock was active to some extent as a composer. The library of the Berlin University of the Arts holds 31 manuscript scores by Dreyschock, including solo, chamber, and orchestral music.
