= Felix Dreyschock =

German pianist & composer (1860–1906)

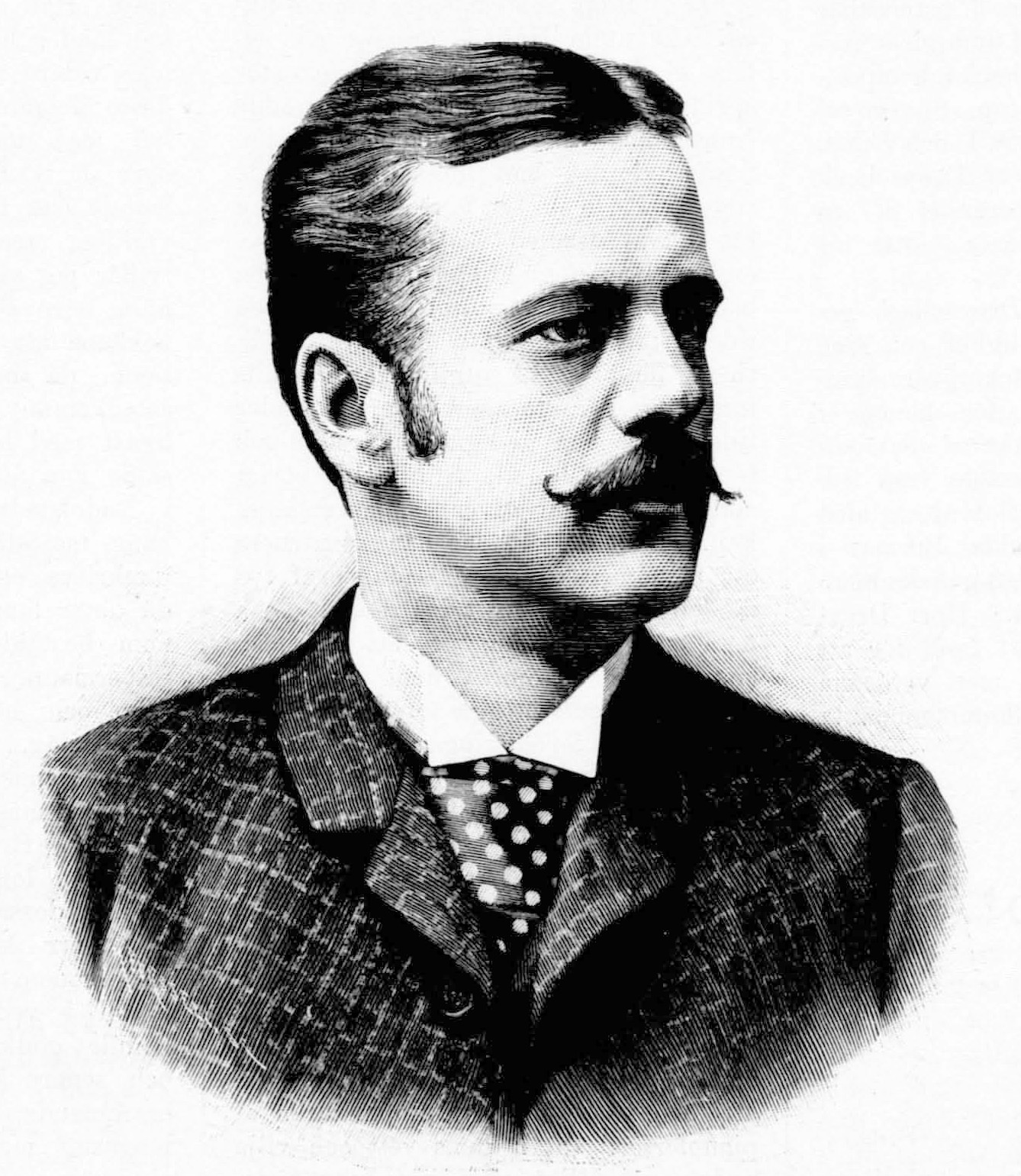
Felix Dreyschock. Xylography 1889.

Felix Dreyschock (27 December 1860 – 1 August 1906) was a German pianist, son of Raimund Dreyschock, and nephew of Alexander Dreyschock.

== Biography ==
Felix Dreyschock was born in Leipzig on 27 December 1860. At the age of sixteen, he studied music with the Leipzig organist Karl Junne. He entered the Royal College of Music in 1875, where he studied with Friederich Grabau and Franz Schulz. Dreyschock studied composition with Friedrich Kiel and Wilhelm Taubert. He further improved his piano technique with Heinrich Ehrlich. He first gave concerts in February 1883 in Berlin and made extensive tours throughout Europe (Austria, Russia, Switzerland, Belgium, Scandinavia).

In Stockholm he performed successfully in 1886 and 1889, both as a virtuoso and composer. Dreyschock taught at the Neue Akademie der Tonkunst and later the Stern Conservatory. He died in Berlin.

== Works ==
He wrote major and minor works including piano pieces, a violin sonata, a piano sonata, and songs. Dreyschock wrote salon pieces of moderate difficulty which were well-received and also a collection of twelve easy pieces based on fairy tales.
