= Heinrich Ehrlich =

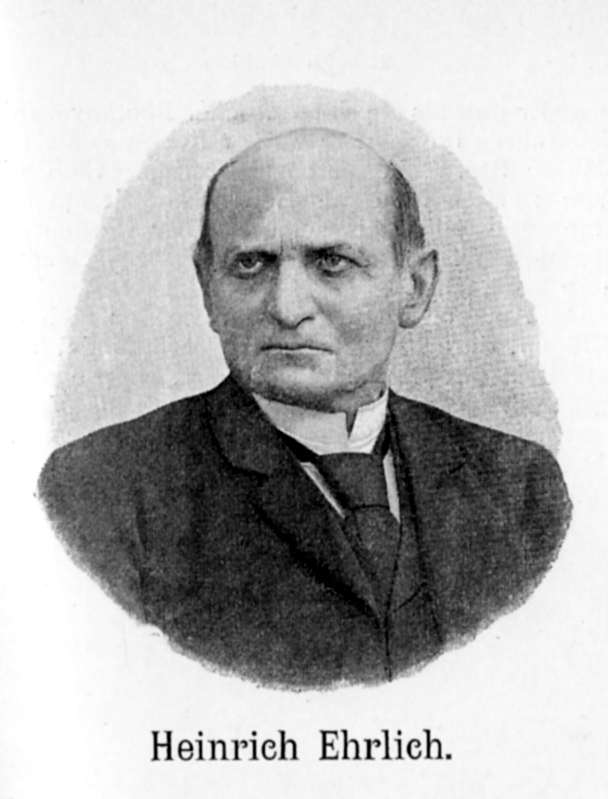
Portrait c. 1893

Alfred Heinrich Ehrlich (5 October 1822, in Vienna – 30 December 1899, in Berlin) was a Jewish pianist, composer and writer on music. As a composer, he came forward with a Piano Concerto and Piano Variations on an Original Theme, being one of the first composers to collect Romanian folk melodies.

== Life ==
Ehrlich finished his high school of music under the leadership of Adolf Henselt, Carl Maria von Bocklet, and Sigismund Thalberg and composition with Simon Sechter. From 1840 to 1844 he performed in Hungary, Romania and Vienna. In 1848, he became correspondent for the Augsburger Allgemeine Zeitung, pianist of King George V of Hanover in 1852, moving to Wiesbaden in 1855. Two years later he went to England and finally settled in Berlin in 1862. There he acquired an excellent reputation as a piano player of Beethoven's compositions. From 1864 to 1872 he was a piano teacher at the Stern Conservatory. Among his pupils were Franz Mannstädt, Friedrich Spiro and Felix Dreyschock, Severin Eisenberger, the critic Paul Marsop, and Wilibald Nagel.

In addition to his teaching activities, he was in Berlin a political correspondent for the magazines Nordic bee (Russian newspaper, in 1862 and later), Vossische Zeitung (1867–69) and L'Independence (1867–69). He was music critic of the Berliner Tageblatt from 1878 until 1898. In 1875, he received the title of professor.

== Books ==
In addition to his journalistic work, Ehrlich became a writer and published novels and musical studies, which were very popular in his day, among which are Schlaglichter und Schlagschatten aus der Music Welt (1872), Wie übt man Klavier? (1879, 2nd edition 1884), Die Music Aesthetik in ihrer Entwickelung von Kant bis auf die Gegenwart (1881), Aus allen Tonarten (1888), Dreissig Jahre Künstlerleben (1893), Modernes Musikleben (1895) and other novels.
