= Elisabeth Wintzer =

German composer

Elisabeth Wintzer (16 June 1863 – 12 June 1933) was a German composer and writer.

== Life ==
Wintzer born in Bad Suderode, Germany. She studied music with Carl Reinecke and Salomon Jadassohn in Leipzig, and married the artist Otto Gerlach.

Wintzer led a girls' Pathfinder group (an outdoor group similar to American Girl Scouts) in Munich.

She died in Bremen. After her death, Richard Wintzer (1866–1952; presumably a relative) copyrighted several songs composed by Elisabeth, which were musical settings of poems by Manfred Kyber. N. Simrock published Wintzer's music.

== Works ==
=== Book ===
- Prinz Louis Ferdinand von Preussen als Mensch und Musiker (Prince Louis Ferdinand from Prussia as a Person and Musician). Leipzig 1915.

=== Chamber music ===
- Five Miniatures for the Lute
- music for flute
- music for piano
- music for violin
- Sternenenglein tanzlied, opus 17 (Little Star Dance Song)

=== Theatre ===
- Johannisnacht (St. John's night; fairy tale)
- Maria in Tann (fairy tale)

=== Vocal ===
- A ls Grossmama ein Maedchen war, opus 10 (When Grandmother was a Girl; duet)
- Hinterm Gartenzaun, opus 11 (Behind the Garden Fence; duet for women's voices)
- Klein Maryke, opus 12 (Little Maryke; voice and piano)
- Maikönigin tanzlied, opus 18 number 2 (May Queen dance song; words by Manfred Kyber, music by Elisabeth Wintzer)
- Miezekatze tanze, und andere Kinderlieder für die Stössel-Laute (Kitty Dance and Other Children's Songs for the Lute; words by Ernst Hegemann, Manfred Kyber, and J.G. W. Schroder, music by Elisabeth Wintzer; 1928)
- Ringlied, opus 20 number 3 (Ring Song; words by Manfred Kyber, music by Elisabeth Wintzer)
- Rosen, opus 20 number 2 (Roses; words by Manfred Kyber, music by Elisabeth Wintzer)
- Schneeflockenreigen, opus 19 (Snowflakes; words by Manfred Kyber, music by Elisabeth Wintzer)
- Schnurrkatze, opus 20 number 1 (Mustache; words by Manfred Kyber, music by Elisabeth Wintzer)
- Tanzleid der Dorfdirnen, opus 15 (Dance of the Village Maidens; duet)
