= Jean Paul Kürsteiner =

- Born: July 8, 1864; Catskill, New York
- Died: March 19, 1943 (aged 78) Los Angeles, California
- Occupations: Piano Teacher, Music Publisher, and Composer
- Instruments: Piano
- Years active: 1910–1930

Jean Paul Kürsteiner (July 8, 1864 in Catskill, New York – March 19, 1943 in Los Angeles, California) was an American pianist, pedagogue, music publisher, and composer of piano pieces and art songs.

== Life and musical career ==
Kürsteiner was the son of a French-Swiss father (August Kürsteiner) and an American mother (Jeannie Taylor Woodruff Kürsteiner). His early education was in New York, then he studied music in Leipzig, including composition with Salomon Jadassohn and Richard Hofmann and piano with Johannes Wiedenbach and Robert Teichmüller. He returned to the United States in 1893, settled in New York City and was appointed to the piano and music theory faculty of the Ogontz School for Girls in Philadelphia. He held that position until 1930. Between 1896 and 1906 he also created, developed, and directed a program of piano study at The Baldwin School in Bryn Mawr, Pennsylvania.

Kürsteiner founded a music publishing house in New York called Kürsteiner & Rice, and published much of his own music there. The "silent" partner in the firm may have been the operatic tenor Leon Louis Rice. The singer was known to have performed Kürsteiner's songs on tour, and some of the songs were written for or dedicated to him.

On July 21, 1901, in Eau Claire, Wisconsin, Kürsteiner married Myrta French, an operatic soprano. In 1938 the Kursteiners moved to Los Angeles, California, where he lived the last years of his life.

== Musical works ==
Kürsteiner composed music in 33 opus numbers for piano solo and art songs for voice and piano in the years between 1910 and 1930. His song Invocation to Eros became fairly well known in its day. For example, it was performed by the American soprano Rosa Ponselle on a concert at Hill Auditorium at the University of Michigan on October 28, 1928. Twelve years earlier, on November 7, 1916, the New York Times review of contralto Frances Ingram at Aeolian Hall in New York praised for her performances of both Kürsteiner's “Invocation to Eros” and “The Soul’s Victory”.

He is also known to have composed and published choral music. An advertisement in the American Guild of Organists journal The American Organist, Volume, 2, no. 1, January 1920, p. A-4, lists “New Choruses for solo, quartet or chorus, with added solos, duos, trios, and contrasting solo quartet sections." The ad also claims that the choruses are "Intense in Devotional Spirit; adapted to all Creeds—Episcopal, Christian Science, Jewish Synagogues, Baptists, etc., of genuine Melodic Beauty. Letters from Coast to Coast indicate their worth as helps to divine worship". A quote from Musical America Magazine praises one anthem as “One of the most conspicuous numbers of devotional music by a contemporary composer that we know”.

== Published Songs ==
Opus, Title, Publisher, Publication date

- 12/1 I would my song were like a Star; G. Schirmer, 1910
- 12/2 How very Near; G. Schirmer, 1910
- 12/3 Lines of a Flame; G. Schirmer, 1910
- 13/1 Song of Life; Kürsteiner & Rice, 1911
- 13/2 Canticle of Love; Kürsteiner & Rice, 1911
- 13/3 Invocation to Eros (text by Edith A. Pusey); Kürsteiner & Rice, 1911
- 14/1 Leave Me Not Yet, O Love; Kürsteiner & Rice, 1911
- 14/2 Love, My Queen; Kürsteiner & Rice, 1911?
- 14/3 Night from the Dark World; Kürsteiner & Rice, 1911?
- 14/4 That One Refrain; Kürsteiner & Rice, 1911
- 14/5 Rose of the World; Kürsteiner & Rice, 1911
- 15/1 Morning; Kürsteiner & Rice, 1911?
- 15/2 Of A’ the Airts the Wind can Blaw; Kürsteiner & Rice, 1911?
- 15/3 The Betrothal; Kürsteiner & Rice, 1911?
- 16/1 Awake, My Love; Kürsteiner & Rice, 1911?
- 16/2 His Lullaby; Kürsteiner & Rice, 1911?
- 17/1 My Heart Sings as the Birds Sing; Kürsteiner & Rice, 1911
- 17/2 O Breath of the Golden Day (text by James B. Kenyon); Kürsteiner & Rice, 1912
- 19 Three Night Songs (text by Martin Schütze); Kürsteiner & Rice, 1912
- 20/1 If I Were a Raindrop; Kürsteiner & Rice, 1912
- 20/2 Only a Day for Tears; Kürsteiner & Rice, 1913
- 24/2 The Salutation of the Dawn (text translated from the Sanskrit); Kürsteiner & Rice, 1915
- 24/3 The Soul’s Victory (Dramatic); Kürsteiner & Rice, 1916
- 24/4 Nightfall (Lyric Song); Kürsteiner & Rice, 1916
- 25/1 Supplication (Religious-Dramatic); Kürsteiner & Rice, 1916
- 25/2 Hope (Religious-Dramatic); Kürsteiner & Rice, 1916
- 25/3 Deliverance (Religious-Dramatic); Kürsteiner & Rice, 1916
- 25/4 Triumphans (Religious-Dramatic); Kürsteiner & Rice, 1917
- 26/1 Penitence; publisher unknown, nd
- 26/2 Promise; publisher unknown, nd
- 26/3 Praise (Lyric-Sacred); Kürsteiner & Rice, 1918
- 26/4 The Message; publisher unknown, nd

12/4 Serenade; G. Schirmer, 1910

== Published Piano Solos ==
- Second Nocturne for Piano; G. Schirmer, 1910
- Dreams of Myrta; Ladies’ Home Journal magazine, 1910
- Bridal Morning Waltz; Ladies’ Home Journal magazine, nd
- Second Nocture for piano; G. Schirmer/Boston Music Co., 1910
- Third Nocturne in A flat; Kürsteiner & Rice, 1911
- 22/1 La Turquoise Valse in C; unknown publisher, nd
- Mazourka de Concert; unknown publisher, nd
- Etude de Concert; unknown publisher, nd
- Etude Melodique for left hand; unknown publisher, nd
- Appassionato in D minor; unknown publisher, nd

== Published Choral works ==
- 25/1a Supplication; publisher unknown, nd
- 25/2a Hope; Kürsteiner & Rice, 1919
- 25/3a Deliverance; Kürsteiner & Rice, 1919
- 26/2a Promise; publisher unknown, nd
- 26/3a Praise; Kürsteiner & Rice, 1919

== Educational Publications ==
- Essays on Expert Aid to Artistic Piano Playing, Unz and Co. publisher, New York, 1910s
- 12 articles on "Artistic Piano Playing" in The Foyer of Philadelphia
