= Žáky =

- Municipality
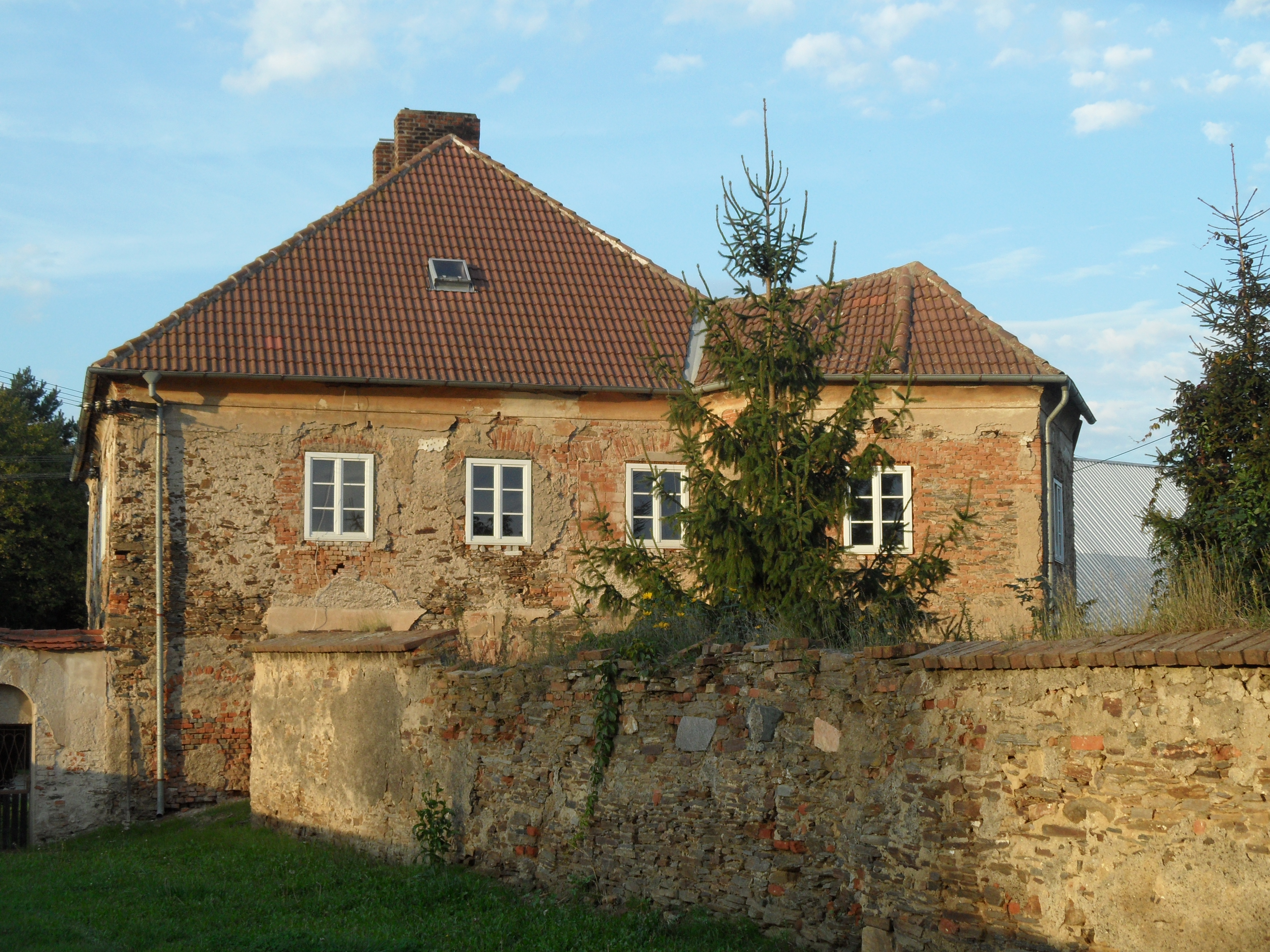
- Žáky Fortress

- Location in the Czech Republic
- Coordinates: 49°53′7″N 15°22′6″E
- Country: Czech Republic
- Region: Central Bohemian
- District: Kutná Hora
- First mentioned: 1407

Area
  - Total: 5.66 km^{2} (2.19 sq mi)
- Elevation: 275 m (902 ft)

Population (2026-01-01)
  - Total: 412
  - Density: 72.8/km^{2} (189/sq mi)
- Time zone: UTC+1 (CET)
  - Summer (DST): UTC+2 (CEST)
- Postal code: 286 01
- Website: www.obec-zaky.cz

Žáky (German: Schak) is a municipality and village in Kutná Hora District in the Central Bohemian Region of the Czech Republic. It has about 400 inhabitants.

== Administrative division ==
Žáky consists of two municipal parts (in brackets population according to the 2021 census):

- Žáky (96)
- Štrampouch (273)

== Demographics ==
Historical population
Year	Pop.	±%
1869	810	—
1880	850	+4.9%
1890	803	−5.5%
1900	800	−0.4%
1910	729	−8.9%
1921	740	+1.5%
1930	644	−13.0%
1950	563	−12.6%
1961	537	−4.6%
1970	473	−11.9%
1980	393	−16.9%
1991	356	−9.4%
2001	346	−2.8%
2011	324	−6.4%
2021	369	+13.9%
Source: Censuses

== Notable people ==
- Alexander Dreyschock (1818–1869), pianist and composer
