= Judith Cloud =

American composer

Judith Cloud (21 July 1954 – 4 August 2023) was an American composer, mezzo-soprano and educator.

== Biography ==
Cloud was born in 1954 to a musical family in Reidsville, North Carolina. In an interview, she noted that "the organist at our church imported my whole family to her new town because she wanted us to sing in her choir". Cloud received vocal performance degrees from the North Carolina School of the Arts and Florida State University. While at FSU, Cloud study with acclaimed soprano Janice Harsanyi. She began her composition studies under Robert Ward.

Her composition was informed by her experience as a touring mezzo-soprano. Cloud toured the United States premiering both her own works and the works of other young composers. Cloud first began composing for voice in 1974. Some of her most notable works are Feet of Jesus and Anacreontics. The cantata Feet of Jesus is set to poems by Langston Hughes. Cloud's music is built on Romantic principles.

Cloud was a professor of voice at Northern Arizona University in Flagstaff, Arizona, beginning in 1989.

She was the 2009 winner of the Sorel Medallion in Choral Composition for her piece Anacreontics.
