= Teichmüller =

Teichmüller is a German surname (German for pond miller) and may refer to:

- Anna Teichmüller (1861–1940), German composer
- de:Frank Teichmüller (born 1943), former German IG Metall district manager "coast"
- Gustav Teichmüller (1832–1888), German philosopher
- Marlies Teichmüller (1914–2000), German geologist
- (Paul Julius) Oswald Teichmüller (1913–1943), German mathematician
- Robert Teichmüller (1863–1939), pianist and professor
- de:Rolf Teichmüller (1904–1983), German geologist

== See also ==
- Teichmüller space
- Inter-universal Teichmüller theory
