= Luigi Zaninelli =

American composer

- Born: March 30, 1932 (age 94); Raritan, New Jersey, U.S.
- Other name: Lou Hayward
- Education: Curtis Institute of Music
- Occupation: Composer
- Years active: 1973–present
- Employer: The University of Southern Mississippi
- Notable work: Compositions
- Awards: Steinway Prize
- Website: luigizaninelli.com

Luigi Zaninelli (born 30 March 1932, in New Jersey) is an Italian-American composer of vocal and instrumental music.

== Biography ==
Zaninelli was born in Raritan, New Jersey, and began his musical career as a jazz pianist at the age of 12, but also learned to appreciate European "Classical" music. He became a student and an instructor at the Curtis Institute of Music in Philadelphia. Curtis sent him to Italy to study under the legendary Rosario Scalero. In 1973, he was appointed to the music faculty as the composer-in-residence at the University of Southern Mississippi in Hattiesburg, a position he held until his retirement in 2009.

He has won several awards for his music. In addition to the Steinway Prize, he is a five-time Mississippi Institute of Arts and Letters winner. He also has a son who is named after him, who was the top individual performer at the 2018 MHSAA Speech and Debate Championships.

== Music ==
Zaninelli has published over 300 works. He uses the name "Lou Hayward" for his jazz compositions and arrangements and his given name for his "serious" compositions. His concert arrangements of Gospel Hymns and Folksongs for solo voice are a favorite of U.S. voice teachers to use with college students.

== Reviews ==
"Luigi Zaninelli is one of America's musical masters. His music is filled with taste, and unique sounds. It is composed with the highest possible craft and imagination." - David Dubal, WWFM, The Classical Music Station, N.Y, NY.

"Luigi is a composer of true melodic gift. This is why I accepted him as a student at the CURTIS SCHOOL OF MUSIC. His music apes no one and is always true to its self." - Gian Carlo Menotti.

"Zaninelli's music has earned him International praise. It is superbly written, containing gems of musical lyricism and originality." - Jerry Deagle, The Calgary Herald

"Zaninelli's music is introspective, ethereal and very personal. It is a music of great originality and imagination." - Leonard Leacock, The Albertan

"His music is hauntingly beautiful and powerful, creating sounds of mystical magic that touch the listener deeply." - Bonny Bomboy, The Hattiesburg American

== Compositions ==
Operas

- Snow White - 1996
- Mr. Sebastian - 1997
- Good Friday - 1998

Vocal and choral works

- Ave Maria (SATB - a capella) (C. Alan Publications)
- The Battle for Vicksburg (theater piece for soprano, piano, and narrator), 1982 (E. C. Kerby)
- Beginnings (solo voice and piano or chamber orchestra, texts by Eudora Welty), 1992 (Harold Flammer/Shawnee Press)
- Five American Gospel Songs (medium voice and piano), 1986 (Harold Flammer/Shawnee Press)
- Five American Revival Songs (solo voice and piano), 1991 (Harold Flammer/Shawnee Press)
- Five Folk Songs (high voice and piano), 1979 (Harold Flammer/Shawnee Press)
- Five Folk Songs (medium voice and piano), 1984 (Harold Flammer/Shawnee Press)
- Five Folk Songs, Volume II (medium voice and piano), 1989 (Harold Flammer/Shawnee Press)
- Five Sacred Songs (solo voice with piano) (C. Alan Publications)
- Good Friday (opera), 1998
- My Father's World (SATB choir with piano) (C. Alan Publications)
- O Child Divine (SATB with organ/piano) (C. Alan Publications)
- Pie Jesu (SATB with organ) (C. Alan Publications)
- Remember, O Mortal Man (SATB with organ) (C. Alan Publications)
- Seven Sanctuary Songs (solo voice and piano), 1987 (Harold Flammer/Shawnee Press)
- Song of Mary (SATB with organ) (C. Alan Publications)
- Trinity Mass (SATB with organ) (C. Alan Publications)

Chamber music

- Autumn Music (trumpet and piano)
- Dance Variations (wind quintet) (Shawnee Press)
- Elegy (alto saxophone and piano) (C. Alan Publications)
- A Lexicon of Beasties (piano and narrator) (G. Schirmer)
- Rome Suite (flute, clarinet, bassoon)
- The Steadfast Tin Soldier (instruments and narrator, revised 1990 for narrator and orchestra) (G. Schirmer)
- Suite Concertante for Alto Saxophone (alto saxophone and piano) (C. Alan Publications)
- Suite Concertante for Flute (flute and piano) (C. Alan Publications)
- Sonatina (bassoon and piano)
- Speak Gently (keyboard percussion quartet)

Orchestra

- The Tale of Peter Rabbit (tuba, narrator, and orchestra) (G. Schirmer)
- The Magic Carousel

Wind Ensemble

- Adagio on a Sussex Carol (C. Alan Publications)
- Burla and Variations for Woodwind Quartet
- The Cymbalist (C. Alan Publications)
- Danza Furiosa (C. Alan Publications)
- The Dwarf of Venice (C. Alan Publications)
- Fantasy for Various & Sundries (for Adaptable Winds & Percussion) (C. Alan Publications)
- Italian Carol (C. Alan Publications)
- Lagan Love (C. Alan Publications)
- Little Scherzo (C. Alan Publications)
- My Father's World (with optional treble choir) (C. Alan Publications)
- Prayer and Canto (C. Alan Publications)
- Remembrance (C. Alan Publications)
- Roma Sacra (C. Alan Publications)
- Sunset (C. Alan Publications)
- Symphony for Winds and Percussion (C. Alan Publications)
- Three Dances of Enchantment (C. Alan Publications)
