= Arthur H. Bird =

American composer

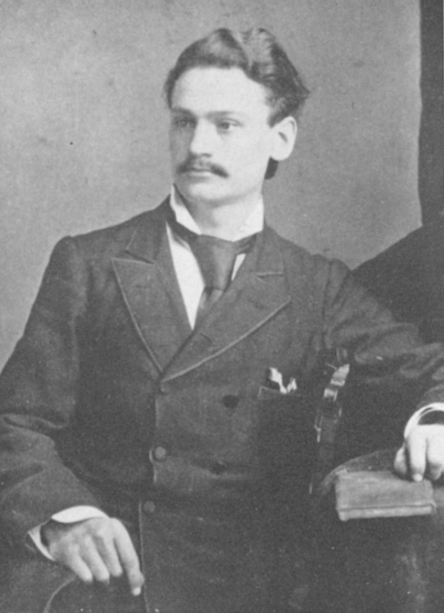
- Arthur Homer Bird in Halifax (before 1881)
- Born: Arthur Homer Bird; 23 July 1856; Cambridge, Massachusetts, United States
- Died: 22 December 1923 (aged 67); Berlin, Germany
- Occupation: Composer
- Spouse: Wilhelmine Waldemann (m. 1888)

Arthur Homer Bird (23 July 1856 – 22 December 1923) was an American composer, for many years resident in Germany. Born in Cambridge, Massachusetts, he studied organ and composition in Berlin and spent a year at Weimar with Franz Liszt. He composed a symphonic poem, Eine Karneval-Szene, Op. 5, and a Symphony in A major, Op. 8 (both in 1886); three orchestral suites; some works for wind instruments alone including a Suite in D; some music for the ballet; a comic opera; and some chamber music; he was also commissioned by the Mason and Hamlin company to write a suite of short pieces for the reed organ.

He married Wilhelmine Waldemann in Peterborough, England in 1888.

Bird died while riding on a train in Berlin in 1923.

== Selected Compositions ==
- Eine Karneval-Szene, Op. 5, symphonic poem (1886)
- Symphony in A Major, Op. 8 (1886)
- Suite in D, for wind dectet
- Serenade for wind dectet
- Marche miniature, for woodwind nonet
