= Pearl G. Curran =

American librettist and composer

Pearl Gildersleeve Curran (Denver, Colorado, June 25, 1875 – New Rochelle, New York, April 16, 1941) was an American librettist and composer of art songs and works for chorus.

== Biography ==
Pearl was born in Denver to J. H. and Elizabeth Tipton Heats Gildersleeve. She was a descendant of settlers who had migrated to Colorado after the Civil War. As a young girl she studied the violin, and later became interested in the piano. She later attended University of Denver. She also studied with Otto Pfeffercorn, Flora Smith Hunsicker and Martha Miner.

She settled in Larchmont, New York, and married Hugh Grosvenor Curran, a manufacturer in New York City. She was a member of ASCAP, the Pen Women’s Society and the Westchester County Music Festival Association.

== Music ==
In 1912, she published Five Love Songs, and in the years that followed she wrote both the text and music to over 40 songs. Many important singers of the first half of the 20th century performed her works, including Enrico Caruso, Anna Case, and John Charles Thomas. Victor Records recorded three of her songs in the 1920s. Caruso premiered her song Life, and it was the only American composition on the choral program at the 1934 music festival in Budapest. Her song Sonny Boy was transcribed into Braille for the blind during her lifetime, indicating its popularity at the time. Her grandchildren, Patricia, Nancy, and Winfred B. Holton III inspired several of her songs, including In My Looking-Glass. At the end of her life, she developed the nationally broadcast radio program A Half Hour with Pearl Curran, for which she provided piano accompaniments to some of her most popular melodies.

She was adept at conveying the mood of the text with melody and accompaniment, ranging from the "serene love song" Nocturne and the "introspective" song Evening, to the more animated and descriptive song Rain, with short and repeated notes in the piano representing a rainy day. However, author Victoria Villamil accurately describes the dichotomy in her songs: "Unquestionably the greatest detriment to her work was her insistence on setting her own simplistic, old-fashioned texts. Otherwise, her songs are imaginative, melodious, and well crafted. Despite their naiveté, they can also be surprisingly elaborate and expansive."

== Musical compositions ==
All published by G. Schirmer unless noted; texts are by the composer unless noted.

=== Secular songs for voice and piano ===
- A Bachelor's Lament (A whimsy), 1927
- The Best is Yet to Be (text by Robert Browning), 1940
- Bird Songs, 1932
- Change o' Mind (An Irish Ballad), 1921
- Contentment
- The Crucifixion (sacred), 1925
- Dawn (text by Feril Hess), 1917, published 1918
- Evening
- Five Songs, 1912, Carl Fischer Music
  - 1. Love's Mystery
  - 2. Twilight
  - 3. When Thou Art Nigh
  - 4. When I'm Alone
  - 5. My Dearie
- Flirtation, 1920, Oliver Ditson
- Ho! Mr. Piper, 1919
- The Holiday, 1919, Oliver Ditson
- I Know (Encore Song), 1924
- In Autumn
- In My Looking-glass, 1931
- Life (text by Mary Stewart Cutting), 1919
- Nocturne, 1923
- Nursery Rhymes, 1921
- Pastorale
- A Picture, 1922
- Rain, 1920
- Sonny Boy, 1919, Oliver Ditson
- To Eostra (Spring song), 1924
- To the Sun, 1920, Oliver Ditson
- Two Idylls, 1921
  - 1. Evening
  - 2. A Pastorale
- The Two Magicians, 1922
- Two Meditations, 1922
  - 1. Contentment (text by M. S. Cutting)
  - 2. In Autumn
- What is a Song? (A Query), 1928

=== Sacred songs for voice and piano ===
- Blessing (Thanksgiving song, text by Joan Secor), 1924
- The Crucifixion
- Gratitude (The Perfect Boon) (text by Earl B. Thomas), 1931
- Hold Thou my hand, 1927
- The Lord is My Shepherd (biblical text), 1921
- Prayer (the Lord's Prayer)
- The Resurrection, 1924

=== Choral arrangements ===
- Bird Gossip, women's voices, 1939
- Bird Songs, women's voices (arr. Carl Deis), 1935
- Blessing, women's voices, 1924; mixed voices (arr. Keith Downing), 1946; mixed voices (arr. William Stickles), 1963
- The Crucifixion, mixed voices (arr. Carl Deis), 1950
- Dawn, women's voices, 1923; men's voices, 1923; mixed voices (arr. Carl Deis), 1927
- Ho! Mr. Piper, mixed voices (arr. Ralph L. Baldwin), 1927
- Life
- Nocturne, women's voices (arr. Ducrest)
- Nursery Rhymes, women's voices (arr. Carl Deis), 1948
- Rain, women's voices (arr. Carl Deis), 1923
- The Resurrection, mixed voices (arr. Carl Deis), 1949
- The Two Magicians, women's voices (arr. Carl Deis)

=== Keyboard works ===
- Blessing (Thanksgiving) (arr. William Stickles)
- Wedding music (for piano or organ), 1922
