= Salomon Jadassohn =

German pianist and composer (1831–1902)

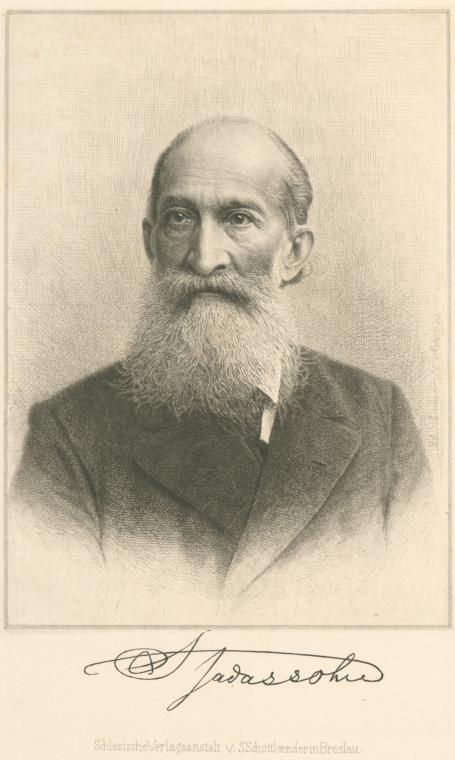
Salomon Jadassohn

Salomon Jadassohn (13 August 1831 – 1 February 1902) was a German pianist, composer, and teacher at the Leipzig Conservatory.

== Life ==
Jadassohn was born to a Jewish family living in Breslau, the capital of the Prussian province of Silesia. This was a generation after the emancipation of the Jews in Central European German-speaking lands and during a time of relative tolerance. First educated locally, Jadassohn enrolled at the Leipzig Conservatory in 1848, just a few years after it had been founded by Felix Mendelssohn. There he studied composition with Moritz Hauptmann, Ernst Richter and Julius Rietz, as well as piano with Ignaz Moscheles. At the same time, he studied privately with Franz Liszt in Weimar. On 13 April 1851 in Weimar he was the soloist at the first performance, under Liszt's baton, of Liszt's arrangement for piano and orchestra of Carl Maria von Weber's Polonaise (Polacca) brillante "L'hilarité" in E major, Op. 72.

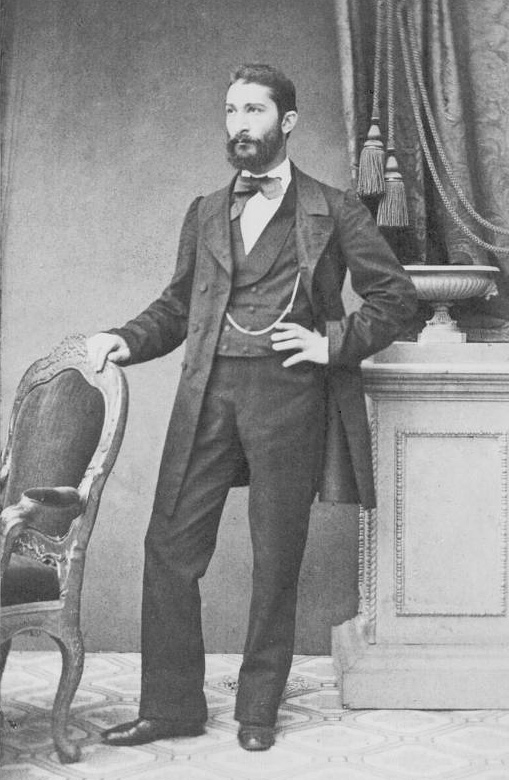
Jadassohn in the 1860s

As a Jew, Jadassohn could not qualify for the many church jobs as music directors or organists which were usually available to Christian graduates of a conservatory such as Leipzig, as they required deep knowledge of Christian liturgy and practice. Instead he worked for a Leipzig synagogue and a few local choral societies as well as teaching privately. Eventually, he was able to qualify for a position at the Leipzig Conservatory, teaching piano and composition.

Over the years, he became a renowned teacher, and Ferruccio Busoni, Frederick Delius, Paul Homeyer, Richard Franck, Sergei Bortkiewicz, Sigfrid Karg-Elert, Ruben Liljefors, Elisabeth Wintzer, Emil Reznicek and Felix Weingartner, Bernard Zweers and Cornelis Dopper were among his many students. Americans also studied with him, including the song composer Jean Paul Kürsteiner and George Strong, a composer of the late 19th and early 20th century. He died in Leipzig, aged 70.

His daughter, Bertha, was married to operetta composer Leo Fall.

== Reputation ==
Since Jadassohn's death, his music has been seldom performed, but in the 21st century a reevaluation of it has begun with new performances and recordings. Cameo Classics commenced a programme of recording his neglected orchestral works. His Symphony No. 1 was recorded with the Belarusian SSO with Marius Stravinsky conducting. The Piano Concerto No. 1 was performed to acclaim at a public premiere (since his death) by soloist Valentina Seferinova and the Karelia State Philharmonic Orchestra, conducted by Denis Vlasenko in Petrozavodsk, Russia on 20 December 2008. A CD including these works was issued by Cameo Classics in January 2009. Jadassohn composed four Serenades for Orchestra and the first three received their premiere recordings from Cameo Classics in 2011, along with his Serenade for Flute and Strings (Soloist Rebecca Hall) with the Malta Philharmonic Orchestra.

Hyperion Records released a recording of Jadassohn's two piano concertos.

The record label cpo has released recordings of the four symphonies and both cavatinas by the Brandenburgisches Staatsorchester Frankfurt conducted by Howard Griffiths.

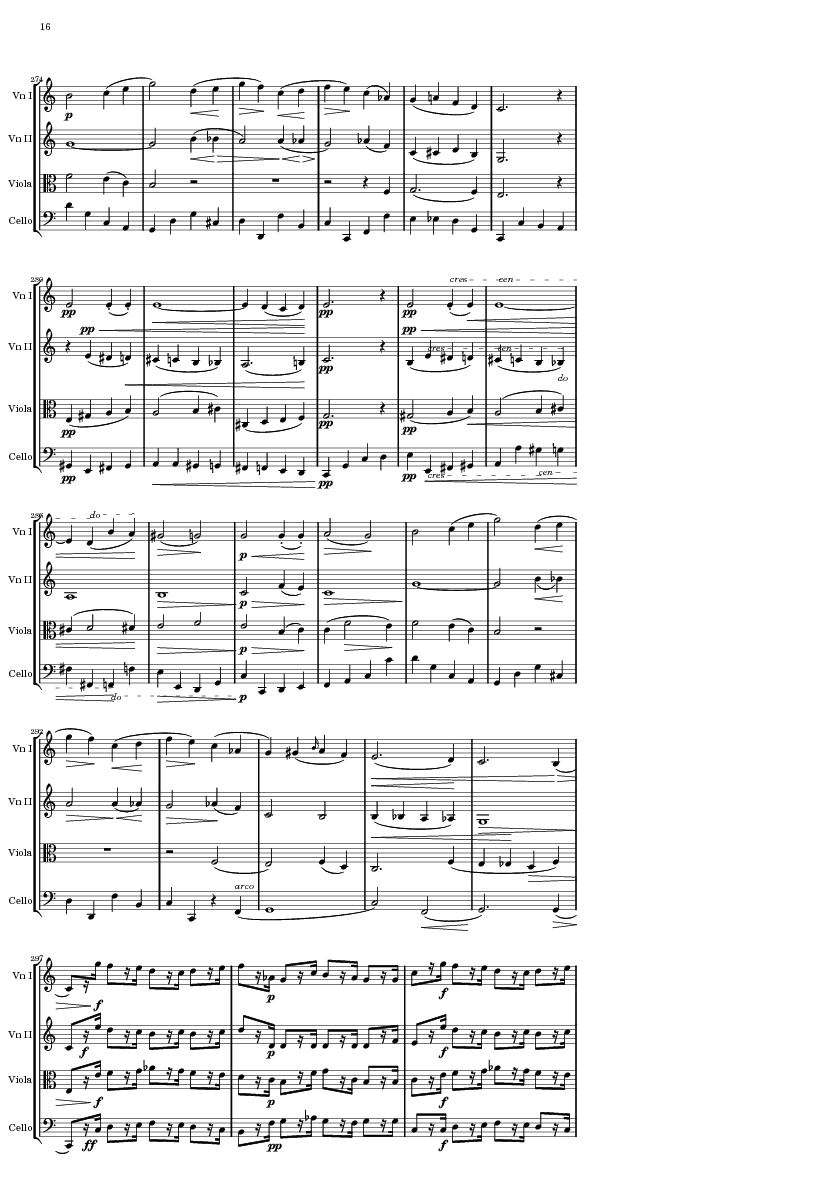
A page from Jadassohn's string quartet (dedicated to Moritz Hauptmann), published in the 1850s - the end of the second group, just before the coda of the first movement.

== Selected list of works ==
=== Symphonies ===
- Symphony No. 1 in C major, Op.24 (1861)
- Symphony No. 2 in A major, Op.28 (1865)
- Symphony No. 3 in D minor, Op.50 (1876)
- Symphony No. 4 in C minor, Op.101 (1889)

=== Concertante works with orchestra ===
- Piano Concerto No. 1 in C minor, Op.89 (1887)
- Piano Concerto No. 2 in F minor, Op.90 (1888)
- Cavatina for Violin and Orchestra in F major, Op.69 (1882)
- Cavatina for Cello and Orchestra in F major, Op.120 (1894)

=== Organ works ===
- Fantasie in G minor, Op. 95

=== Chamber music ===
- Serenade for Winds, Op. 104 (1890)
- Sextet for piano 4 hands, 2 violins, viola, cello, Op.100 (1888)
- Piano Quintet No. 1 in C minor, Op.70 (1883)
- Piano Quintet No. 2 in F major, Op.76 (1884)
- Piano Quintet No. 3 in G minor, Op.126 (1895)
- Piano Quartet No. 1 in C minor, Op.77 (1884)
- Piano Quartet No. 2 in G major, Op.86 (1887)
- Piano Quartet No. 3 in A minor, Op. 109 (1890)
- String Quartet in C minor, Op.10 (1858)
- Piano Trio No. 1 in F major, Op.16 (1858)
- Piano Trio No. 2 in E major, Op.20 (1860)
- Piano Trio No. 3 in C minor, Op.59 (1880)
- Piano Trio No. 4 in C minor, Op.85 (1887)
- Violin Sonata in G minor, Op.5 (1857)
- Notturno op.133 for flute and piano
- Capriccio op.137 for flute and piano

=== Other ===
- Serenade No. 3 in A major, Op. 47 (1876)

== Media ==
- Scores for Kaila's Piano Performances listed here are available at the imslp.org Category:Jadassohn, Salomon web page
- https://imslp.org/wiki/Category:Jadassohn,_Salomon

Kaila Rochelle keyboard performance of Jadassohn: Improvisationen Op.75 No.6 Capriccio

Kaila Rochelle keyboard performance of Jadassohn: Improvisationen Op.75 No.5 Bitte

Kaila Rochelle keyboard performance of Jadassohn: Improvisationen Op.75 No.1 Bolero

Kaila Rochelle keyboard performance of Jadassohn: Improvisationen Op.75 No.2 Ländler

Kaila Rochelle keyboard performance of Jadassohn: Improvisationen Op.75 No.3 Zwiegespräch

Kaila Rochelle keyboard performance of Jadassohn: Op.40 Theme and 10 Variations

Kaila Rochelle keyboard performance of Jadassohn: Op.8 Capriccio giocoso

Kaila Rochelle keyboard performance of Jadassohn: 4 Salonstucke Op.3 No.1 thru No.4

Kaila Rochelle keyboard performance of Jadassohn: Op.56 Prelude-Fugue No.6

Kaila Rochelle keyboard performance of Jadassohn: 6 Stammbuchblätter OP.71 No.6 Souvenir

Kaila Rochelle keyboard performance of Jadassohn: Op.23 Etudes No.1 thru No.6 complete
