= George Templeton Strong (composer) =

American composer and painter (1856–1948)

George Templeton Strong (May 26, 1856 – June 27, 1948) was an American composer of classical music and a professional painter. His work has been described as Romantic. He moved to Vevey, Switzerland, in 1897 and lived there and in Geneva for the remainder of his life. Although his career was in Europe, he is considered an American composer.

== Early life and education ==
George Templeton Strong was born in New York City to Ellen (Ruggles) and George Templeton Strong, an attorney. The family was musical; both parents were amateur musicians and his father, an amateur organist, was on the board of the New York Philharmonic Society. His father was active in the community and helped found the United States Sanitary Commission during the American Civil War. Since the 1930s, the senior Strong has been notable for the literary quality of his voluminous diary, which he kept most of his life.

With early musical promise, the son was given lessons and training, studying the piano, violin and oboe. He occasionally played as an oboist and English horn player with the Metropolitan Opera Orchestra. While the senior Strong hoped his son would follow him in the law, they became reconciled before the father's death.

== Career ==
In 1879 Strong traveled to the Leipzig Conservatory in Germany, where he became a pupil of Salomon Jadassohn and Richard Hofmann together with many European musicians who became prominent in the next decades. He composed his third symphonic poem, Undine, Op. 14, in 1883. In 1886 Strong moved to Wiesbaden, where he became close friends with American composer Edward MacDowell. There he composed The Haunted Mill and completed his Symphony No. 2 "Sintram" in G minor in 1888.

After his 1891 return to the United States, Strong taught counterpoint and composition at the New England Conservatory in Boston. He disliked the work, and his health suffered. In 1897 he moved back to Europe to Vevey, Switzerland, on Lake Geneva. For the next several years he studied watercolor painting and worked as professional artist. About 1912, he moved to Geneva, where he began to compose music again. He lived in Geneva for the rest of his life and painted seriously for 30 years.

His compositions include:

- Undine, Op. 14, symphonic poem
- Three Symphonic Idylls for two pianos, Op. 29
- The Haunted Mill, cantata
- Symphony No. 2 "Sintram" in G minor, Op. 50. Dedicated to composer Edward MacDowell. (premiered 1893)
- La nuit, four brief symphonic poems
- Legende, quartet for 4 horns in F (1915)
- Le roi Arthur, symphonic poem (1916)
- An der See, symphonic poem (lost)
- Elegy for cello and orchestra
- The Life of an Artist for violin and orchestra, dedicated to Joseph Szigeti
- Hallali for solo horn and orchestra (1923)
- Suite for cello and orchestra (1923)
- Chorale on a theme of Hans Leo Hassler (1929)
- Six pieces for cello and orchestra (1931)
- String Quartet (1935)

In 2002, three of his orchestral pieces were recorded digitally for the first time and released on the Naxos label: Symphony No. 2 in G minor, Op. 50, La nuit and Le roi Arthur.

== Private life ==
Strong married three times. He first wed Frances Gertrude Veronica Anderson (a cousin of the theatrical costume designer and painter, Percy Anderson) in June 1883 at Samer, France, then Elizabeth Jane Myers in 1894 at Brentford, UK and finally around 1946, Léonie Clara Ehrat.

In 1948 Strong died aged 92 in Geneva, where he had lived for more than 30 years.
