= Louis Campbell-Tipton =

American composer

Louis Campbell-Tipton (November 21, 1868– May 1, 1921) was an American composer.

== Biography ==
He was born in Chicago, Illinois on November 21, 1868. Other sources cite 1877 as his birth year.

Louis Campbell-Tipton studied in Boston and Leipzig, and was an instructor in theory at the Chicago Musical College from 1900 to 1905.

Aged 24, he moved to Paris where he remained for the rest of his life. He felt that the prospects for performance of large-scale American works in the United States were bleak, and claimed that he had never wished to sacrifice the energy needed to complete a large work. Even so, at his death a number of pieces for orchestra were found among his manuscripts, as were two operas. During his life he was known mainly for his chamber music.

One of his songs, "A Spirit Flower", was recorded by the Swedish tenor Jussi Bjorling.

He died in Paris on May 1, 1921.

His last composition was titled "Day's End".

== Works ==
=== Unknown genre ===
- Day's End
- Suite Pastorale Op. 27, (c1911)
- Suite Op. 29: Les Quatre Saisons (c1911)

=== Art Songs and Vocal Music ===
- A Gleam of Sunshine, song, words by Henry Wadsworth Longfellow
- Elegy (op. 33 no. 1), words by Walt Whitman
- Hymn to the Night, words by Henry Wadsworth Longfellow
- If I Were King, words by Justin Huntly McCarthy
- I Will Give Thanks Unto the Lord (op. 25 no. 1), chorus with piano/organ accompaniment (c1936)
- Memory, song. Premiered in Paris in 1907 by Charles W. Clark
- The Opium Smoker, song. Premiered in Paris in 1907 by Charles W. Clark
- Rhapsodie (op. 32 no. 1), words by Walt Whitman
- 4 Sea Lyrics, song cycle for voice and piano, words by Arthur Symons (c1907)
  - 1. After Sunset
  - 2. Darkness
  - 3. The Crying of Water
  - 4. Requies
- A Spirit Flower, song (1908), words by B. Martin Stanton.

=== Piano Music ===
- Solitude (1888)
- Sonata Heroic, piano sonata (1904)

=== Instrumental Music ===
- Rhapsodie
- Romanza Appassionata, duo for violin and piano (c1903)

=== Tone Poems ===
Amongst other compositions, he wrote the following tone poems:

1. Beside the Sea. (Op.3 No.1).
2. The Sea Shell. (Op.3 No.2).
3. Confession. (Op.3. No.3).
4. Summertide. (Op.3. No.4).
5. Longing. (Op.3. No.5).
6. Night Musings. (Op. 3. No. 6).

=== Opera ===
- Mercedes, opera in two acts, from the drama of Thomas Bailey Aldrich (1906)
