= String Quartet (Jadassohn) =

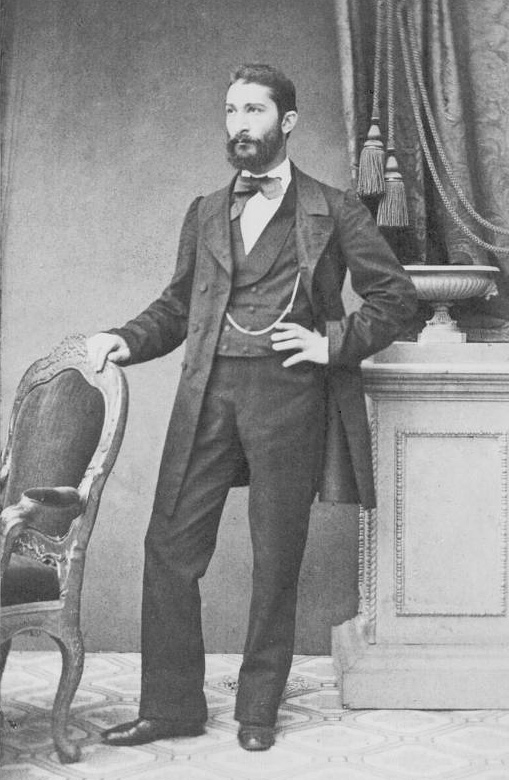
Salomon Jadassohn in the 1860s

Salomon Jadassohn's String Quartet in C minor, Op. 10, is the composer's only work for the medium. Published in 1858, the quartet was dedicated to his teacher, Moritz Hauptmann.

== Structure ==
The work is structured in four movements:

1. Molto Allegro ed appassionato
2. Adagio ma non troppo
3. Allegretto un poco vivo
4. Finale: Allegro ma non troppo – Presto

To date the quartet has not been recorded commercially.
