= Celius Dougherty =

American songwriter

Celius Hudson Dougherty
- Born: May 27, 1902; Glenwood, Minnesota
- Died: December 22, 1986 (aged 84) Effort, Pennsylvania
- Genres: Folk
- Occupations: Composer, Pianist
- Instrument: Piano

Celius Hudson Dougherty (May 27, 1902 – December 22, 1986) was an American pianist and composer of art songs and other music.

== Biography ==
Celius Hudson Dougherty was born to William Francis Dougherty and Louise Martha Dougherty in Glenwood, Minnesota. Celius was interested in music and poetry from childhood. He claimed that he wrote his first song when he was seven years old. He was part of a musical family, and his mother, a music teacher and church musician, organized her seven children into a band. Celius performed as accompanist for one of his mother's song recitals at age ten.

He graduated with a Bachelor of Arts degree, magna cum laude from the University of Minnesota, where he studied piano with Donald Ferguson and composition. As an undergraduate, he performed his own piano concerto with the school orchestra. In 1924 he won the "Schubert Prize" for piano performance, sponsored by the Schubert Club. He used that scholarship to continue his studies at the Juilliard School, where he was a student of Josef Lhévinne in piano and Rubin Goldmark in composition.

In New York, where he lived for nearly fifty years, he performed his piano Sonata in E Flat at Aeolian Hall in 1925 and his Sonata for Violin and Piano in 1930. As a result of the latter performance, he was given the privilege of working at the MacDowell Colony during the summers of 1931, 1932 and 1933 with artists who were "stimulating influences," including Thornton Wilder, Edward G. Robinson, Ruth Draper and Padraic Colum. He composed the one-act opera Damia, based on Petronius' Satyricon during these years (1930–32).

He toured as an accompanist to several important singers, such as Maggie Teyte, Eva Gauthier, Povla Frijsh, Jennie Tourel, Marian Anderson, and Alexander Kipnis. These performers often included Dougherty's songs on their programs. He made recordings with Frijsh and Kipnis for Victor in the late 1930s.

Beginning in 1939, he also toured with Vincenz Ruzicka in duo-piano recitals. During the next 16 years, they gave the first performances of duets by Igor Stravinsky, Arnold Schoenberg, Alban Berg, Paul Hindemith, Darius Milhaud, and others. They performed with the Vienna Symphony in 1955. A documentary on the duo was filmed in 1981.

Dougherty retired to Effort, Pennsylvania, and died there in December 1986.

== Music ==
Dougherty composed one opera, about 200 songs, and a few instrumental works. Since their creation, his songs have been considered excellent for student singers and are often heard on American recital programs.

The songs were composed over a 40-year period, from the 1920s to the 1960s. They are simple, "generally optimistic, often humorous", and "rendered with taste and skill." Because he was a pianist-composer, the piano accompaniments to his songs are usually well-crafted and interesting.

== Musical compositions ==
Songs for voice and piano

- Ballad of William Sycamore
- Children's Letter to the United Nations
- Declaration of Independence
- Eglantine and Ivy
- Green Meadows (Anonymous text)
- Heaven-Haven (text by Gerard Manley Hopkins), Carl Fischer, 1956
- Hushed be the Camps Today (memories of President Lincoln) (text by Walt Whitman)
- The K'e (text from the Chinese), 1954
- Listen to the Wind (text by Wolfe)
- Love in the Dictionary (text from Funk and Wagnalls dictionary), 1949
- Loveliest of Trees (text by A. E. Housman), Boosey & Hawkes, 1948
- Madonna of the Evening Flowers (text by Lowell)
- A Minor Bird (text by Robert Frost, 1958
- Music (text by Amy Lowell), 1953
- Pianissimo, Lady (text by Lowell)
- Primavera (text by Amy Lowell, 1948
- Seven Songs
- Song of the Jasmin (text from the Arabian Nights)
- Songs by E. E. Cummings, 1966
1. thy fingers make early flowers of all things
2. until and i heard
3. o by the by
4. little fourpaws
- Sound the Flute! (text by William Blake)
- The Taxi (text by Lowell)
- Whispers of Heavenly Death (song cycle for baritone and piano)
- What the Bullet Sang (Bret Harte)

Song arrangements

- Five Sea-Chanties
- Five American Folk Songs, duets for soprano and baritone

Other works

- Piano Concerto, 1922
- First Piano Sonata, 1925
- Violin Sonata, 1928
- Second Piano Sonata, 1934
- String Quartet, 1938
- Music from Seas and Ships, sonata for two pianos, 1942-43
- Many Moons, one-act opera, based on a story by James Thurber, 1962

== See also ==
- Bender, J. The Songs of Celius Dougherty, thesis, University of Minnesota, 1981.
