= Alfred Pease (musician) =

American classical composer

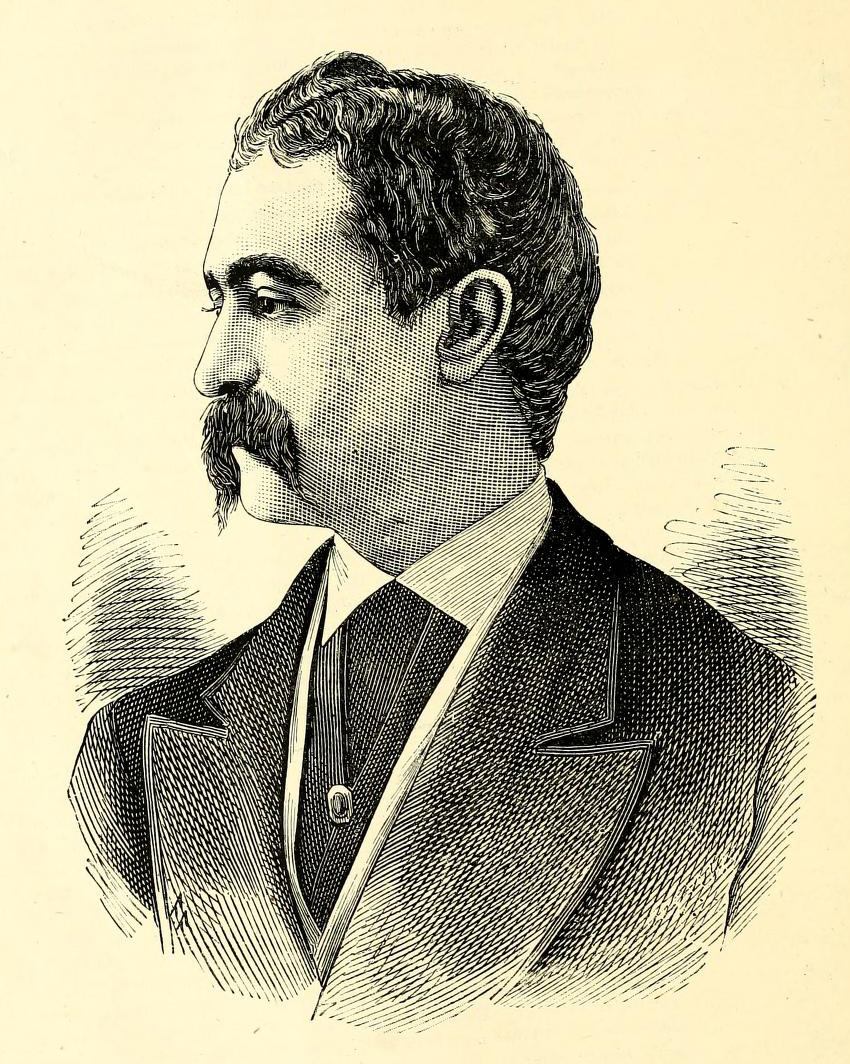

Alfred Humphreys Pease (May 6, 1838 in Cleveland, Ohio – July 12, 1882 in St. Louis, Missouri), studied at Kenyon College, where he was a member of Delta Kappa Epsilon and later in Germany under music professors Theodor Kullak, Richard Wüerst, Wilhelm Wieprecht, and Hans von Bülow.

Pease was a popular composer and pianist in the 19th century. His earliest song (1864) "Break, break break" was one of the most popular tunes of the time, performed throughout the United States and Europe by some of the foremost musicians of the day. His orchestral compositions include "Riveiere arid Andante," "Andante and Scherzo," "Romanze," and "Concerto," all of which were performed by Theodore Thomas's orchestra in New York and other cities.
