= Four-leaf clover (disambiguation) =

Four-leaf clover is a rare variation of the common three-leaf clover (genus Trifolium).

Four-leaf clover may also refer to:

== Other plants ==
- Oxalis tetraphylla, sometimes known informally as "lucky clover" and "four-leaf clover"
- Marsilea, aquatic ferns, common names include water clover and four-leaf clover
  - Marsilea quadrifolia

== Music ==
- "Four Leaf Clover", a 1996 song by Abra Moore
- Four Leaf Clover Records, a Swedish record company and independent label established by musician, bandleader and producer Lars Samuelson in the early 1970's
- Four Leaf Clover, a 2009 album by Four Celtic Voices and Erin Hill
- Four Leaf Clover, a 2007 album by Li Yifeng
- "The Four Leaf Clover", a song by Charles Whitney Coombs (1859–1940)
- "4 Leaf Clover", a song by Erykah Badu from the 1997 album Baduizm
- "Four Leaf Clover", a song by Second Person from the 2011 album Come to Dust
- "Four-leaf Clover", a song by Twice from the 2021 album Perfect World
- "Four Leaf Clover", a song by Catherine from the 1996 album Hot Saki & Bedtime Stories
- "Four Leaf Clover", a 2017 song by Christian Hudson
- "Four Leaf Clover", a song by The Kooks from the 2018 album Let's Go Sunshine
- "Four Leaf Clover", a song by The Badlees from the 2002 album Renew
- "Four Leaf Clover", a song by Diana Vickers from the 2010 album Songs from the Tainted Cherry Tree
- "Four-Leaf Clover", a song by Winger from the 2006 album IV
- "Four Leaf Clover", a song by Destine from the 2012 album Illuminate
- "Four Leaf Clover", a song by Badly Drawn Boy from the 2004 album One Plus One Is One
- "Four Leaf Clover", a 2006 song by Mellowdrone
- "4 Leaf Clover", a song by Old 97's from the 1994 album Hitchhike to Rhome

== Other uses ==
- "Four-Leaf Clover", an episode of A Love So Beautiful (2020 TV series)
- "The Four-Leaf Clover" (1990), a short story by Isaac Asimov from the 1990 collection Puzzles of the Black Widowers

== See also ==
- Quatrefoil ('four-leafed')
- "I'm Looking Over a Four Leaf Clover", a song from 1927
- Fourth United States Army, whose shoulder sleeve insignia is a four-leaf clover
