= Timothy Kramer =

American composer

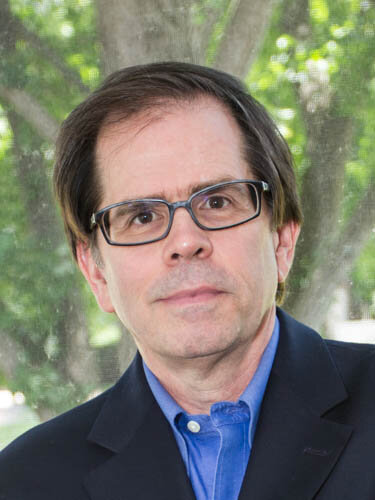
- Born: Timothy Alan Kramer; July 3, 1959 (age 67); Seattle
- Education: Pacific Lutheran University, University of Michigan, Hochschule für Musik, Detmold
- Occupations: Composer and educator
- Years active: 1981–present
- Style: Contemporary classical music
- Website: Timothy Kramer

Timothy Kramer (born 1959) is an American composer whose music has earned him a Fulbright Scholarship, an National Endowment for the Arts grant, and a Guggenheim fellowship. Currently Professor Emeritus at Illinois College in Jacksonville, Illinois, he served as the Edward Capps Professor of Humanities at Illinois College, and also served on the faculty of Trinity University (San Antonio) as Professor of Music, and is a founding member of the Composers Alliance of San Antonio.

== Biography ==
=== Early life ===
Although born in Seattle, Kramer was raised in Pasco, Washington, the son of Robert and Shirley Kramer. His father was a physician, and his mother was a homemaker. Both parents encouraged his interest in music by supporting his lessons on piano along with lessons on guitar and percussion at a young age. His first piano teacher, Cherry Courteau, gave him his strongest foundations as a musician. His earliest experiences as a composer began in grade school and he experimented with arrangements of popular music for his high school jazz ensemble (Pasco High School). He also studied classical organ and Jazz improvisation.

In high school, much of his time was devoted to playing bass guitar in different ensembles. He entered Pacific Lutheran University in 1977 as an engineering major but switched to music composition by his second year of studies. His first work, a 30-minute string trio titled Of All the Centuries, received a student award from Broadcast Music, Inc. in 1981 which confirmed his decision to continue to study composition.

His graduate work at the University of Michigan led him to meet many other living composers outside of his primary instructors, such as Krzysztof Penderecki, Karlheinz Stockhausen, Elliott Carter, and Alberto Ginastera, and this influenced his decision to study abroad (with Martin Redel). He also met his wife, Lisa Udel, during his graduate studies in Ann Arbor, Michigan.

=== Career ===
Kramer was trained as a composer and organist at Pacific Lutheran University (PLU) in Tacoma, Washington studying with David Robbins (composition) and David P. Dahl (organ). He also played electric bass and jazz piano in addition to his compositional studies. He earned his master's degree and doctorate at the University of Michigan, where his primary composition teachers were William Albright, Leslie Bassett, William Bolcom and George Wilson. He studied organ with James Kibbie and harpsichord with Edward Parmentier. As a Fulbright Scholar, he studied with Martin Redel at the Hochschule für Musik Detmold, in Germany from 1988 to 1989.

Early in his career, he taught at Indiana State University, Rose Hulman Institute of Technology, and at the University of Michigan. Starting in 1991, he taught for 19 years at Trinity University in San Antonio. While living in San Antonio, he founded (with composers David Heuser and Elisenda Fábregas) the group CASA (Composers Alliance of San Antonio), a group that promotes contemporary music in South Texas.

In 2010, he moved to Illinois College in Jacksonville, Illinois, where he was Chair of the Music Department and named the Edward Capps Professor of Humanities in 2013. He became professor emeritus in 2020.

== Awards and commissions ==
Kramer has received a number of awards including a Guggenheim Fellowship, a Fulbright Scholarship, grants from the National Endowment of the Arts, the American Music Center (now New Music USA), and the MacDowell Colony, New Music USA, the Artist Foundation of San Antonio, and awards from the American Guild of Organists, Broadcast Music, Inc. (two Student Awards in 1981, 1983), ASCAP, Indiana State University, and the Clear Lake Symphony, among others.

He has received commissions from the San Antonio Piano Competition (now named Gurwitz Competition), the Midwest Clinic, the SOLI Chamber Ensemble, the Detroit Chamber Winds, Trinity University, the San Antonio Symphony, the Utah Arts Festival, the San Antonio Chamber Choir, the Cactus Pear Festival, the Jacksonville Symphony Society (Illinois), Ensemble Mise-en, and the ONIX Ensemble. He also served as Composer-Not-in-Residence with the San Francisco Choral Artists for the 2019–2020 season.

== Music ==
Kramer's works reflect his fascination with visual patterns, cycles, and musical gestures that unfold in a variety of changing speeds and textures. Most of his works articulate a clear tonal hierarchy and have a strong melodic component, but some earlier works from his career (e.g. Sentinels of the Dance, Concerto for Organ and Orchestra) are more dissonant and abstract. His instrumental music has been described as "constantly inventive, clear, full of energy, and admirably precise," "superbly crafted and intriguingly complex," and an "...approachable style, firmly grounded in tonality." His choral music has been described as "purely gorgeous" and "radiant."

His works have been performed throughout the U.S. and in Europe and Asia, with performances by symphony orchestras (Detroit, Indianapolis, San Antonio, Tacoma), chamber groups (North/South Consonance, SOLI Chamber Ensemble, ONIX Ensemble, Luna Nova, Detroit Chamber Winds, Ensemble Mise-en) and university ensembles (Michigan State, Arizona State, Indiana University, Florida State, etc.). He has also been a featured composer at the San Antonio International Piano Competition, the Midwest International Clinic, the Utah Arts Festival, and at national conferences of the American Guild of Organists, the Society for Electro-Acoustic Music in the United States, the American Choral Directors Association, the Society of Composers, Inc., and the College Music Society

His catalog mainly includes orchestral compositions, solo and chamber works, and choral compositions.

== Partial list of works ==
=== Large ensemble (orchestral and wind band) ===
- A Fivescore Festival (1990)
- All in Golden Measure (2013)
- Concerto for Organ and Orchestra (1994)
- Mosaics (1999, wind band)
- Sentinels of the Dance (1985)
- Symphony B–A–C–H (2007)
  1. BACH meets EsCHeR
  2. Schizo-Scherzo
  3. Meditation Chorale
  4. Party Favors

=== Choral ===
- Cradle Song (Dormi Jesu) (2019, SATB)
- Lux Caelestis (2011, SS, AA, TT, BB)
  1. Yehi-Or
  2. At toi Atrem
  3. Pabhassara Sutra
  4. Gayatri Mantra
  5. Lux Aeterna
- Shipwreck (2020, SATB)
- Tik’u Chaf (Clap Your Hands) (2019, SATB)

=== Small ensembles ===
- Cycles and Myths (1996, quartet – B♭ Cl., Pno., Vln., Vc.)
- Lake Effect (2012, sextet – Fl., Cl., Pno., Perc., Vln., Vc.)
- Mimetic Variations (1998, octet – 2 Obs., 2 Cls., 2 Hrns, 2 Bsns.)
- Rituals (2014, septet – 3 Trps., 3 Trbs., Perc.)
- The Pendulum Swings (2016, quintet – Fl./Picc., Bass Trb., Pno., Vln., D.B.)
- Three Pairs Suite (2009, sextet – Fl., B♭ Cl., Pno., Perc., Vln., Vc.)

=== Solos/duos/electronic works ===
- Colors from a Changing Sky (1994, piano)
- Der Virtuos (1987–88, piano with visuals)
- Etude Fantasy (on a theme for Madame Duruflé) (1995, organ)
- Fantasy (1984, electronic tape)
- Fingerpaintings (1985, rev. 1988, guitar and harpsichord)
- Firmament Etudes (1997, 1994, piano)
  1. Horizon's Edge
  2. Colors from a Changing Sky (1994)
  3. Moonsprites
- Key Fragments (200, B♭ clarinet)
- Meditation (Noël Nouvelet, 2002, organ)
- Perceptions of Antiquity (1983, organ)
- Vanishing Perspectives (2005, amplified cello)

=== Miscellaneous ===
- Alma Mater for Trinity University (1998, 1999, 2002, various arrangements)
- Of All the Centuries (1981, string trio)

=== Recordings / discography ===
- Symphony B–A–C–H; A Fivescore Festival; Sentinels of the Dance; All in Golden Measure, with Jiří Petrdlík, Conductor, Janáček Philharmonic, 2020, on Sentinels, (Navona)
- Lux aeterna (unaccompanied choir S.A.T.B.), with Marek Vorlicek, Conductor, Kühn Chorus, 2016, on Cadence: New Works for Voices in Verse, (Navona)
- Mosaics (wind band), with Brian K. Doyle, Conductor, The Crane Wind Ensemble, 2015, on Adirondack Songs, (Mark Records) Liner Notes.
- Cycles and Myths (mixed quartet), with SOLI Chamber Ensemble, 2014, on Musica Por Un Tiempo, Albany Records. Liner Notes.
- Lux Caelestis: Yehi-Or and Lux Caelestis: Pabhassara Sutta, with Scott MacPherson, San Antonio Chamber Choir, 2013, on 2013 ACDA National Conference San Antonio Chamber Choir - EP.
- Cycles and Myths (mixed quartet), with SOLI Chamber Ensemble, 2005, on Works by San Antonio Composers played by San Antonio Performers, (Composers Alliance San Antonio)
- Etude Fantasy (on a theme for Madame Duruflé, organ), with David Heller, 1996, on Veni Creator Spiritus, (Calcante Recordings, Ltd.)
- Colors from a Changing Sky (piano), with Max Lifchitz, on The American Collection, 1998, (Naxos of Canada)
- Der Virtuos (piano), Jeri-Mae Astolfi, Society of Composers, Inc. Performers Series, 2007, on Sonance, (Capstone)

== Listening on YouTube ==
- "Cycles and Myths" – SOLI Chamber Ensemble on YouTube
- "Lux Aeterna" – Kühn Choir on YouTube
- "Mosaics" – Crane Wind Ensemble on YouTube
- "Symphony ‘B–A–C–H’: I. Bach Meets Escher" on YouTube
- "Tik’u Chaf (Clap Your Hands)" – San Francisco Choral Artists on YouTube
