= Rita Porfiris =

American violist and arranger

- Genres: Classical
- Instrument: Viola

Rita Porfiris is an American violist and arranger.

== Career ==
The early career of Rita Porfiris started as a member and rotating principal violist of the New World Symphony under Michael Tilson Thomas, where she also performed as soloist. While there she formed the Plymouth Quartet, which went on to win a prize at the Fischoff National Chamber Music Competition and receive Austria’s Prix Mercure. With the quartet she toured South America and Europe, and was in-residence at Florida International University. At the age of 24 she joined the Houston Symphony. In 1997 she won second prize at the Primrose International Viola Competition and joined the faculty at the University of Houston Moores School of Music. She remained at the Houston Symphony and Moores School until 2009, when she joined the faculty of The Hartt School at the University of Hartford, where she served as Professor of Viola and Chair of Chamber Music and Strings. She has also been on the faculty of New York University. In 2023 she left the Hartt School and joined the Iceland Symphony as co-principal viola.

Her articles on physical fitness and the viola and on related topics have been published in the Journal of the American Viola Society and she was featured on the July–August 1998 cover of Symphony Magazine for playing an ergonomic viola.

She has served on the jury for the Washington International Competition for Strings and was a selection committee member for the United States Fulbright Scholar Program.

She performs regularly as a soloist and chamber musician. She is the violist in the Miller-Porfiris Duo with her husband, violinist Anton Miller.

== Premieres, arrangements, recordings ==
Rita Porfiris has commissioned and performed the world premiere or U.S. premiere of many solo and chamber works for the viola. Composers she has premiered and/or commissioned include Errollyn Wallen, Max Lifchitz, Frank Wallace, Peter Aviss, Ken Steen, Mario Diaz Gavier, David Ashley White, Robert Avalon, and others.

She has recorded (as well as commissioning and premiering) the Lifchitz Confrontaçion for Viola and Chamber Orchestra with the North/South Ensemble; Errollyn Wallen’s Five Postcards; a chamber version of Strauss’ Don Quixote by and with cellist Laszlo Varga; and recorded the first complete collection of Robert Fuchs’ Twelve Duets.

=== Discography ===
Partial list of recorded works for solo viola or chamber:

- Max Bruch: Eight Pieces Op. 85 for Violin, Viola, and Piano
- Robert Fuchs: 12 Duets for Violin and Viola
- Mario Diaz Gavier: Tres Epigramas
- Reinhold Glière (arr. Porfiris): Eight Pieces Op. 39 for Violin and Viola
- Libby Larsen: Black Birds, Red Hills
- Max Lifchitz: Confrontaçion for Viola and Orchestra
- Bohuslav Martinů: Duo No. 2
- Richard Strauss (arr. Varga): Don Quixote
- Ernst Toch: Divertimento Op. 37 No. 2 for Violin and Viola
- Heitor Villa-Lobos: Duo No.2
- Errollyn Wallen: Five Postcards
- David Ashley White: Aria from Songs & Dances for a Celebration

She has also arranged many works for viola and orchestra, violin and viola, and viola ensemble.
