= Ann Callaway =

American composer

Ann Marie Callaway (born October 28, 1949) is an American composer.

== Life and career ==
Callaway was born in Washington, D.C., and grew up in Langley Park. She began her musical training in Baltimore under Grace Newsom Cushman and later studied with Alvin Etler at Smith College, George Crumb at University of Pennsylvania and with Jack Beeson, Fred Lerdahl and George Edwards at Columbia University, where she earned her D.M.A. in 1991.

Callaway's compositions have been widely broadcast in the U.S., and she is the subject of a documentary produced by Swedish Radio. She has received a Guggenheim Fellowship, commissions from the National Endowment for the Arts and the American Guild of Organists, and has held residencies at Yaddo, the MacDowell Colony, Voci and the Leighton Artist Colony in Banff. She is a recipient of the Fred Waring Award, and the Miriam Gideon Prize.

In 1984 Callaway was one of the founders of the New York Women Composers, Inc., an organization that supports women composers in the State of New York and the Greater New York City area through catalogs, events and grants.

== Works ==
Her principal publisher is Subito Music.

== Recordings ==
- The Gregg Smith Singers American Choral Masters Series Vol. IV contains Alleluia vidimus stellam (1980), a setting of the alleluia verse for Epiphany
- American Composers' Alliance at 50 (Opus One 143) contains Paraphrasis (1981), an organ fantasy on the tune INNSBRUCK, played by Haskell Thomson
- Four Elements: works for horn and piano by female composers (Lin Foulk, horn & Martha Fischer, piano) contains Four Elements (1974–77)
- Music by Women: a Celebration (CPS-8714) (Rosemary Platt, piano; et al.) contains Theme and Seven Variations (1972)
