= American Guild of Organists =

Professional association

- Formation: January 1, 1896; 130 years ago
- Type: Professional association
- Legal status: 501(c)(3)
- Purpose: To foster a thriving community of musicians who share their knowledge and inspire passion for the organ.
- Headquarters: New York, New York
- Location: United States
- Members: Approximately 11,000
- Official language: English
- President: Eileen Hunt, DMA, AAGO
- Vice President/Councillor for Competitions and New Music: Peggy Haas Howell
- Secretary/Councillor for Communications: Leslie Wolf Robb
- Treasurer/Councillor for Finance and Development: John S. Dixon
- Key people: Cathy Brigham, PhD, Executive Director
- Website: www.agohq.org

The American Guild of Organists (AGO) is "the national professional association serving the organ and choral music fields. The Guild serves approximately 250 chapters and 10,000 members throughout the United States and abroad. The mission of the American Guild of Organists is to foster a thriving community of musicians who share their knowledge and inspire passion for the organ." It is a non-profit corporation headquartered in New York and registered under section 501(c)(3) of the U.S. tax code since 1955.

Membership is not limited to professional organists, but is open to anybody with an interest in organs and organ music. As of 2026, there are approximately 10,000 voting members in all categories of membership. The AGO's current president is Eileen Hunt, elected in 2022.

The guild seeks to set and maintain high musical standards and to promote understanding and appreciation of all aspects of organ and choral music.

== Founders ==
Among the 145 founding members of the guild were Benjamin Dwight Allen, John W. Bischoff, Edward Morris Bowman, Dudley Buck, George Whitefield Chadwick, Kate Sara Chittenden, Charles Whitney Coombs, Gaston Dethier, Clarence Dickinson, Clarence Eddy, Mary Chappell Fisher, Arthur Foote, William W. Gilchrist, Henry Houseley Henry Holden Huss, Bruno Klein, Ernst R. Kroeger, Benjamin Johnson Lang, Peter C. Lutkin, Will C. Macfarlane, Charlotte Wells Saenger, Frank T. Southwick, Fannie Morris Spencer, Samuel Prowse Warren (also served as President of the AGO in 1902), and Herve D. Wilkins. Gerrit Smith was the AGO's first warden and later served as president of the organization. Clifford Demarest also played an important role in its first two decades.

== Organization ==
The American Guild of Organists is geographically divided into seven regions and 298 chapters. The AGO has chapters in Australia (Sydney), Barbados, Hong Kong, Kenya (Nairobi), Finland (Helsinki), Singapore, Shanghai, and Taiwan. The European chapter is the oldest chapter outside of the US, with many members in France and Germany, as well as other countries.

The leadership of the AGO consists of a National Council, seven regional councillors forming a Board of Regional Councillors, and various local chapters within each region. The national headquarters is located at 475 Riverside Drive, Suite 1260, in New York, New York, in the Interchurch Center.

The National Council is the governing body of the American Guild of Organists. The four national officers, five national councillors with committees in portfolio, and the chair of the board of regional councillors (selected by the seven regional councillors from among their number) are members of the National Council. The executive director is a non-voting member of the National Council. The chaplain is an honorary member of the National Council.

The national officers of the guild consist of a president, a vice president/councillor of competitions and new music, a secretary/councillor for communications, and a treasurer/councillor for finance and development. National councillors coordinate and represent to the National Council specific areas of the work of the guild—education, membership, competitions and new music, conventions, young organists, and finance and development.

The regional ambassadors are elected by the members of the guild assigned to chapters within each of the seven regions. Regional ambassadors are responsible for supervision and coordination of the work of the Guild in their regions and representation of the region on the National Council through the Chair of the Council of Regional Ambassadors. The Coard of Regional Ambassadors meets in person with the National Council once per year with voice, but no vote.

Appointed district conveners are responsible for the development of the guild's interests in each state or area located within the region. The district convener assists the regional councillor in the work of the region.

In addition to district conveners, regional coordinators are appointed to assist the regional councillor and a national councillor in coordinating work of a specific portfolio area of the guild within the region, such as education, regional competitions for young organists, and professional development.

In 2014, the formerly nine regions were consolidated into seven, and the current slate of Regional Ambassadors are listed below:

- Northeast - Patricia Snyder, DMA
- Mid-Atlantic - David Schelat, MM (Chair of the Council of Regional Ambassadors)
- Southeast - Timothy Shepard, MSM, CAGO
- Great Lakes - Jeffrey Neufeld, DMA
- North Central - Catherine Rodland, DMA
- Southwest - Melissa Plamann, DM
- West - Valerie Harris, DMA, CAGO

Over the years, a number of international chapters have been formed and are grouped into the following AGO regions:

- Northeast:
  - Europe, Finland
- Southeast:
  - Barbados, Nairobi
- West:
  - Hong Kong, Sydney (Australia), Shanghai, Singapore, Taiwan

These international chapters formally affiliate with the AGO rather than other professional associations that may already exist in their country, such as the Royal Canadian College of Organists or Royal College of Organists (UK).

Eileen Hunt is currently president, elected in 2022 to a two-year term to succeed Michael Bedford (2016–2022). Other past presidents serving in the 21st century, and their terms in office, include John Walker (organist) (2014–2016), Eileen Guenther (2008–2014) and Frederick Swann (2002–2008).

== Programs and publications ==
The American Organist – monthly journal of the AGO

The organization holds national conventions in even-numbered years and regional conventions in odd-numbered years. The 2010 national convention held in Washington, D.C., on July 4–8, for example, included workshops and concerts at prominent Washington-area churches, with premieres of newly commissioned works. The 2014 national convention, attended by more than 1,700 members, featured several notable venues in the Boston area, including Memorial Church of Harvard University and Trinity Church. The 2020 national convention planned for July in Atlanta, Georgia, was cancelled due to the COVID-19 pandemic. The 2024 convention was held in San Francisco, CA, and the 2026 convention is scheduled for July 6 - 10 in St. Louis, MO.

The AGO sponsors a number of education programs, including "Pipe Organ Encounters", which are intended to introduce youth to the organ and its workings. It also produces a series of instructional DVDs for organists, providing insights into advanced playing technique, organ registration, improvisation, and interpretation. Renowned organists on these Master Series videos are: Catharine Crozier (vol. 1), Marie-Claire Alain (vol. 2), Frederick Swann (vol. 3), Gerre Hancock (vol. 4), and Marilyn Mason (vol. 5).

The AGO issues several professional certificates and designations upon completion of the appropriate exams and membership in good standing: the Service Playing Certificate (SPC), Colleague (CAGO), Choir Master (ChM), Associateship (AAGO), and Fellowship (FAGO), the highest level of certification bestowed upon accomplished organists by the organization's Board of Examiners.

== The American Organist ==
Until November 1967, the journal The Diapason (published by Scranton-Gillette) was billed as the Official Journal of the American Guild of Organists, and the Official Magazine of the Royal Canadian College of Organists. In 1967, the AGO began publishing Music Magazine, a news journal for its membership. Now titled The American Organist, the monthly magazine is the official journal of the AGO. The illustrated periodical features news about new and restored pipe organs, concert programs, research into organ literature, chapter activities, and reviews of new organ recordings. The American Organist is also the official magazine for the Associated Pipe Organ Builders of America. Its masthead proclaims the journal's goal, to further the AGO's "ideals, objectives, and cultural and educational aspirations". From October, 1968, to June, 2009, The American Organist was also the official journal of the Royal Canadian College of Organists. The AGO also is an affiliate with the online journal Vox Humana.

== Contests ==
The AGO organizes several awards and competitions, including the Pogorzelski-Yankee Competition, the AGO/ECS Publishing Award in Choral Composition, and the AGO/Marilyn Mason Award in Organ Composition.

The AGO/Marilyn Mason Award has its roots in the Holtkamp Organ Composition Contest, which was inaugurated in 1978 by Walter Holtkamp (president of the Holtkamp Organ Company) and Donald Hinshaw (president of Hinshaw Music) to encourage composers under 30 years of age. The Holtkamp Organ Composition was held annually until 1984 in conjunction with the International Contemporary Organ Music Festival at the Hartt School of Music. Winners of the Holtkamp Organ Composition Contest included:

- 1978: Thomas Crawford and Frank Wiley, co-winners; Steven Errante and Paul Hofreiter, honorable mentions
- 1979: Richard Campanelli, winner; Robert Sirota, honorable mention
- 1980: Thomas Crawford and Blair Sanderson, co-winners; Frank Wiley, honorable mention
- 1982: James Primosch

In 1984 the award was rebranded as the AGO/Holtkamp Award which awards a commission (and publication) for an organ work and a cash prize. It's held every two years in conjunction with AGO's national convention. In 2010 the award was rebranded as the AGO/Marilyn Mason Award to honor Marilyn Mason. Until 2016 the winning compositions were published by Hinshaw music; since then they have been published by H. T. FitzSimons. Winners include:

- 1984: Ingrid Arauco for What Seraphs Are Afoot
- 1986: Timothy Kramer for Perceptions of Antiquity
- 1988: Martin Matalon for Variations for Organ and Percussion
- 1990: Frank Ferko for A Practical Program
- 1992: Ellen Ruth Harrison for That Line Which Is Earth's Shadow
- 1994: Timothy Tikker for Variations SUr Un Vieux Noel
- 1996: Robert Greenlee for Three Spirituals for Palm Sunday and Aaron Hunt for Fantasia and Fugue on St. Theodulph
- 1998: Carlyle Sharpe for Confitemini Domino
- 2000: David Arcus for Song of Ruth and Naomi
- 2002: Emily Porter for What Wondrous Love Is This, O My Soul?
- 2004: George Akerley for A Sweet for Mother Goose
- 2006: Barrie Cabena for Six Sketches on Children's Hymns
- 2008: Rachel Laurin for Prelude and Fugue in F Minor
- 2010: Michael Bedford for Theme and Variations on Le P'ing
- 2012: Nicholas O'Neill for Festive Voluntary
- 2014: No prize awarded
- 2016: Ivan Božičević for The Moonpiper
- 2018: Mark Kurtz for Re-Formations (after Bach)
- 2020: Joel Peters for Eine Wolke nahm ihm Weg
- 2022: Rashaan Rori Allwood for In Memory Of...
- 2024: Brooke Joyce for Into the Trees

== Recognition ==
In 2013 the AGO was inducted in the American Classical Music Hall of Fame.

== See also ==
- Royal College of Organists (RCO), the older, British counterpart of the AGO
- Damin Spritzer
