= Dorothea Austin =

American pianist and composer

Dorothea Austin Banner (1921 (Note: Several sources including VIAF and WorldCat cite 1922 as Austin's date of birth.) – 25 June 2011) was an Austrian-born American pianist and composer who specialized in electronic and computer generated music.

== Biography ==
Austin was born Dorothea Blaukopf into a Jewish family in Vienna, Austria. As a child, she was already performing as a concert pianist. She fled to England before World War II on the last Kindertransport sponsored by the Red Cross. Her brother Viktor and her parents died during the war.

In England she worked at a factory for a while to support herself, but was eventually taken in by Quaker philanthropists Nelly and Rachel Leighton. She studied piano at the Royal College of Music and the Royal Academy of Music with Tobias Matthay in London, and afterward worked as a concert pianist.

She married Dr. Hermann Augapfel (Harry Austin), who was held during the war in a British camp for foreigners from enemy countries. She began serving as a piano teacher at that time, and continued this work after the couple emigrated to the United States in 1949. The Austins settled in Valley Stream, Long Island, where they lived until Harry Austin died in 1974.

As her performing career had been interrupted by the war, Austin attended Queens College (CUNY) in New York City, where she studied composition with Leo Kraft and George Perle. She developed an interest in electronic forms and composition with synthesizer, working successfully as a composer. Austin took a position as professor at Queensborough Community College, where she remained for nearly forty years, also serving as department chair. Austin was a member of the New York Women Composers Association.

After the death of Harry Austin, she married Gerson Banner, who died in 2004. Austin had three daughters. Her papers are stored at Queensborough Community College Library.

== Selected works ==
- Transformation for viola, piano and tape (1973)
- Fantasia for piano and orchestra (1984)
- Syndetos for piano (1984)
- Analogy for viola, cello and piano (1985)
- Metamorphosis for cello and piano (1986)
- Reflections I
- Reflections II for high voice, flute (piccolo), oboe (English horn), clarinet, horn and bassoon; words by Stephen Crane
