= Alfa Romeo Quadrifoglio =

Brand by Alfa Romeo

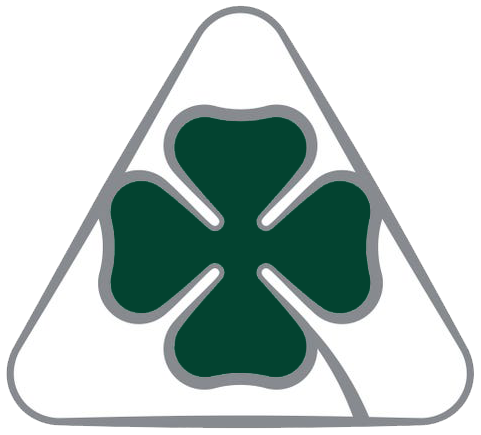
- Quadrifoglio logo introduced in June 2015

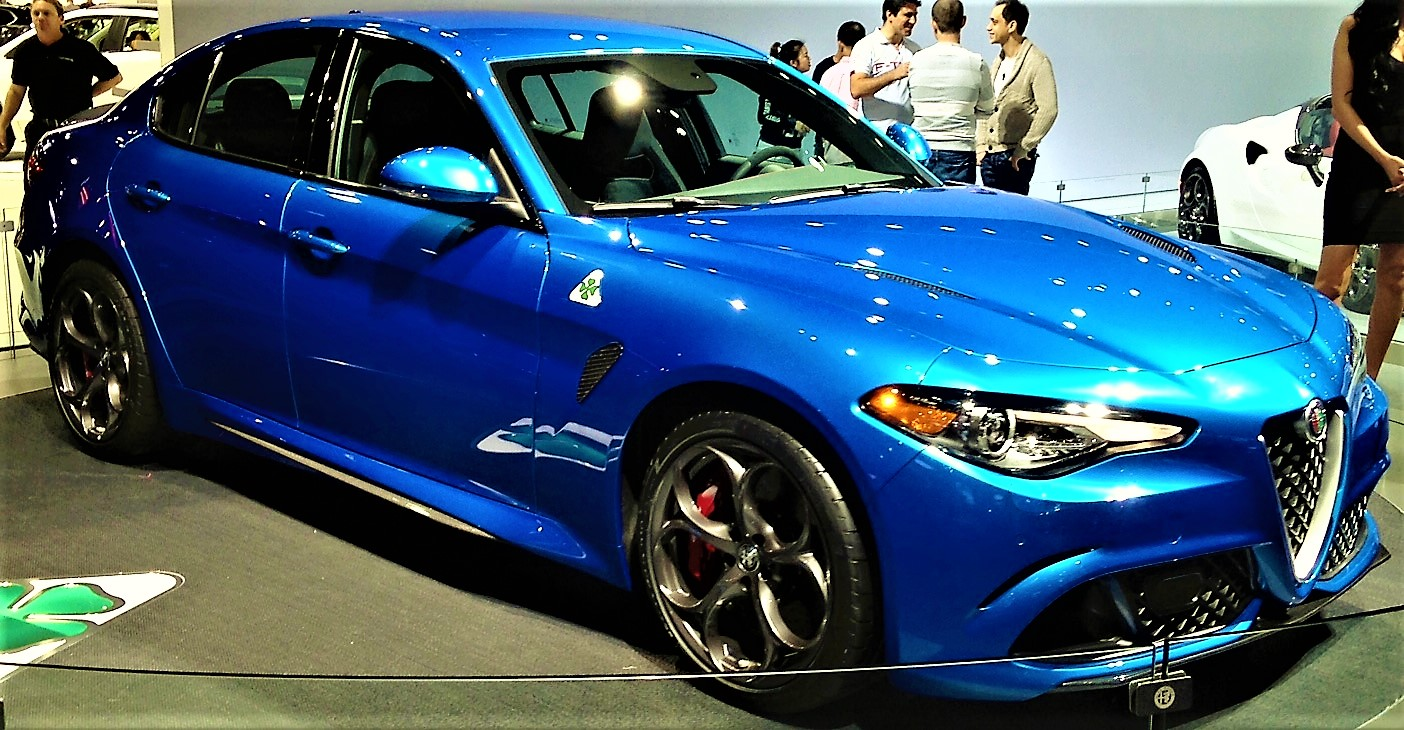
- 2015 Alfa Romeo Giulia Quadrifoglio
- Type: Marque
- Industry: Automotive industry
- Founded: 1923; 103 years ago
- Owner: Stellantis
- Parent: Alfa Romeo
- Website: www.alfaromeo.com/quadrifoglio

The Quadrifoglio (Italian for 'four-leaf clover'; pronounced [kwadriˈfɔʎʎo]) is the brand used by the Italian auto manufacturer Alfa Romeo to indicate a high performance model. The Quadrifoglio is usually placed on the side panels of the car, above or behind the front wheels—on the front wings in the case of modern vehicles. The logo consists of a green four-leaf clover contained in a triangle.

== History ==
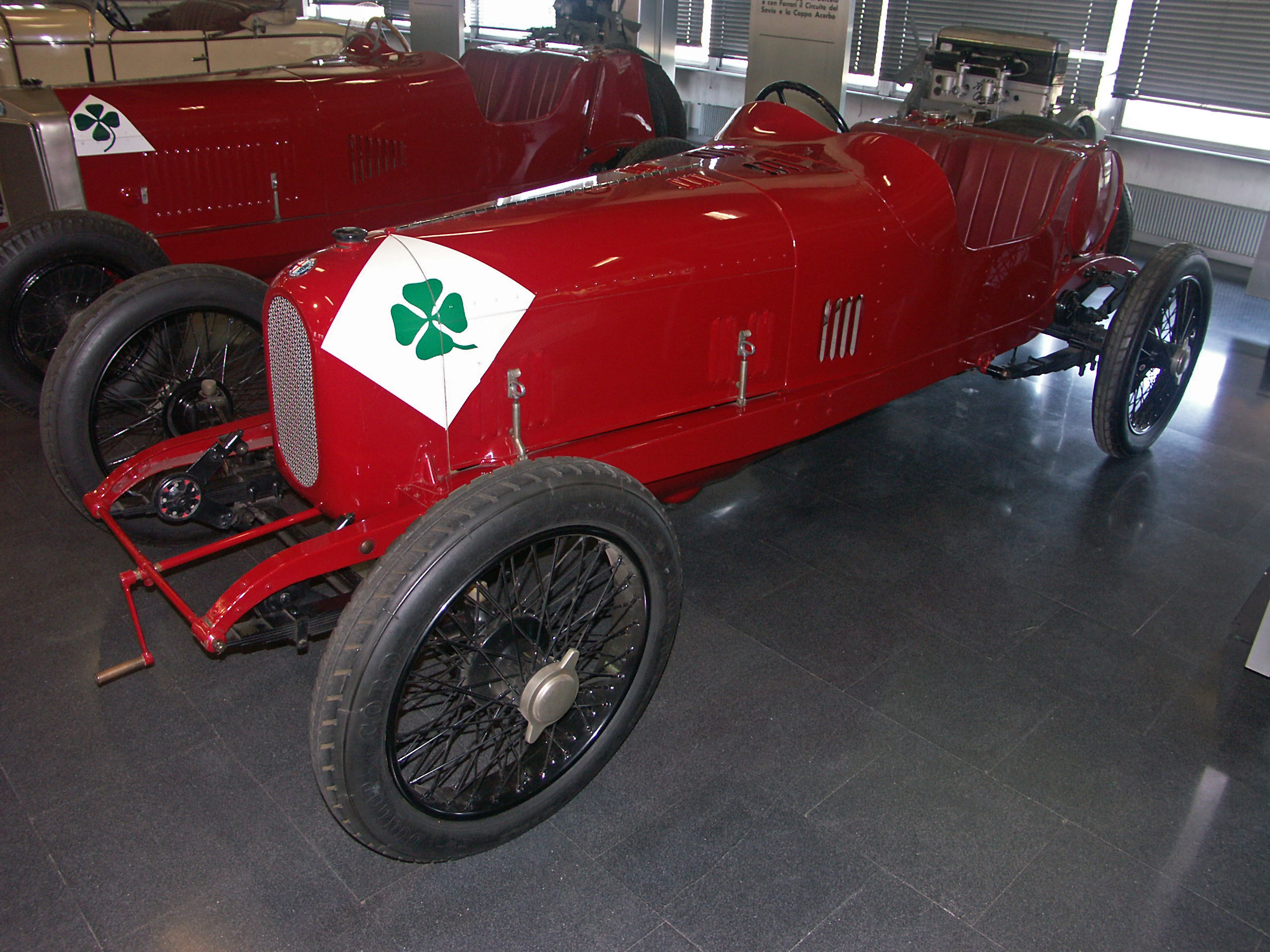
The RL Targa Florio of Ugo Sivocci. Note the original square white background.

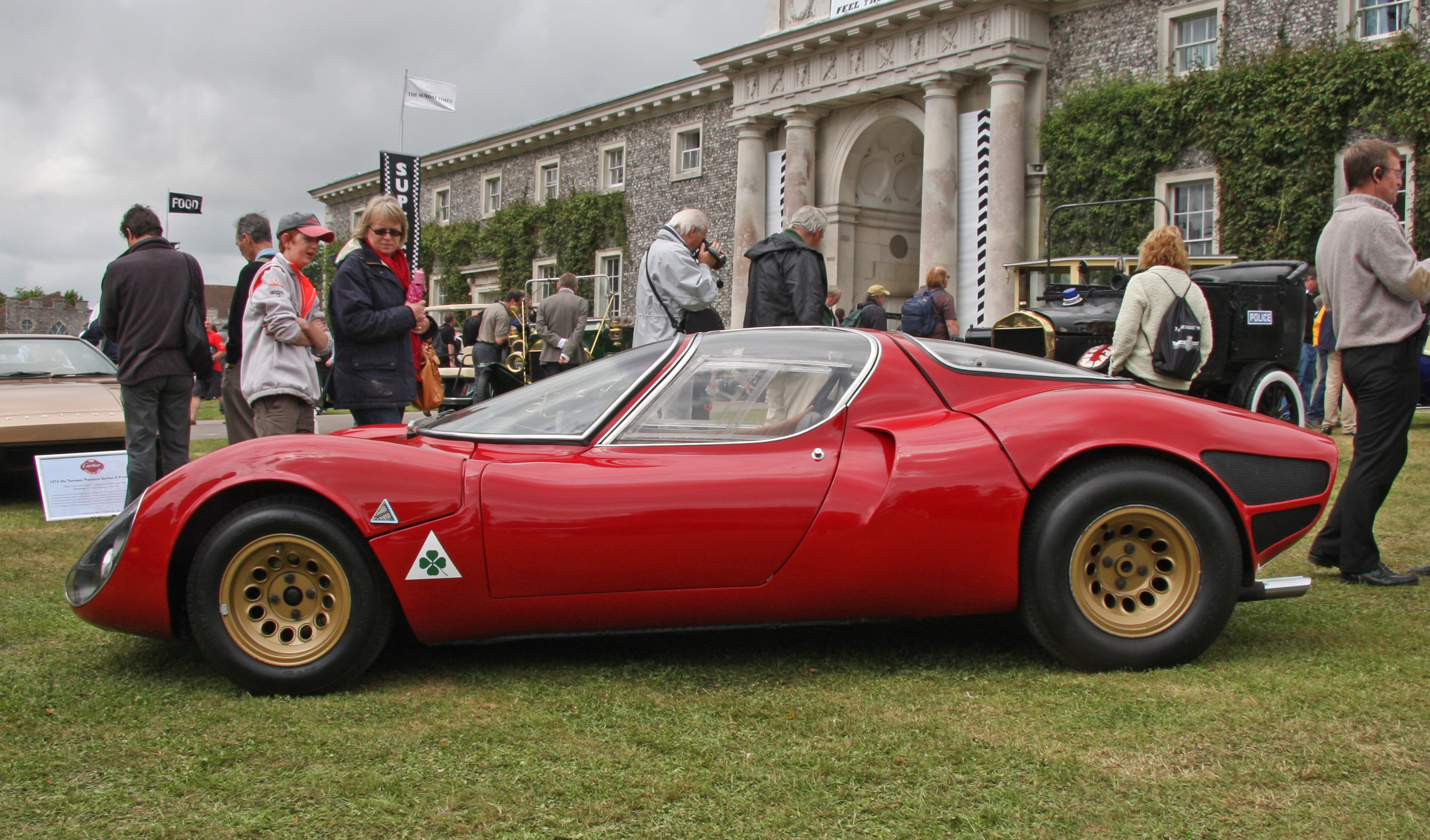
The quadrifoglio in a triangular field on the 33 Stradale in 1967, inserted next to the Autodelta logo

The four-leaf clover symbol appeared for the first time on one of the four RL Targa Florio autos in 1923. This auto was specially prepared by Giuseppe Merosi for the Targa Florio in Sicily, considered the most prestigious auto racing competition at the time. Despite high aspirations, major success at racing eluded Alfa Romeo until this time. Alfa had won some class victories and minor competitions, but due to inexperience and misfortune Alfa had not won a major international event. For the Targa Florio of 1923, Merosi developed four cars, entrusting them to Antonio Ascari, Enzo Ferrari, Giulio Masetti and Ugo Sivocci. Sivocci, Ferrari's discoverer and friend, was a pilot of great experience and technical competence, but had poor luck and was considered l'eterno secondo (Italian for 'the eternal second'). To ward away his misfortune, Sivocci had painted on the grille of his car a white square in which stood a green four-leaf clover. The outcome of that Targa Florio race on the track in Madonie convinced the superstitious the four-leaf clover (quadrifoglio) charm was effective. Towards the end of the race the chances of victory were limited to the leading trio, composed of Ascari and Sivocci, followed by Minoia on a Steyr VI Klausen Sport. Just two hundred meters from the finish, the Alfa RL of Ascari went out. Ascari's lead allowed his mechanics to arrive in time to restart his engine, but in their euphoria they all got on board to cross the finish line with Ascari, causing a disqualification. So Ascari returned to the point where he had stopped his car to retrace that part of the track. He finished second behind Sivocci who, meanwhile, had crossed the finish line as a winner, assuring Alfa Romeo their first international victory.

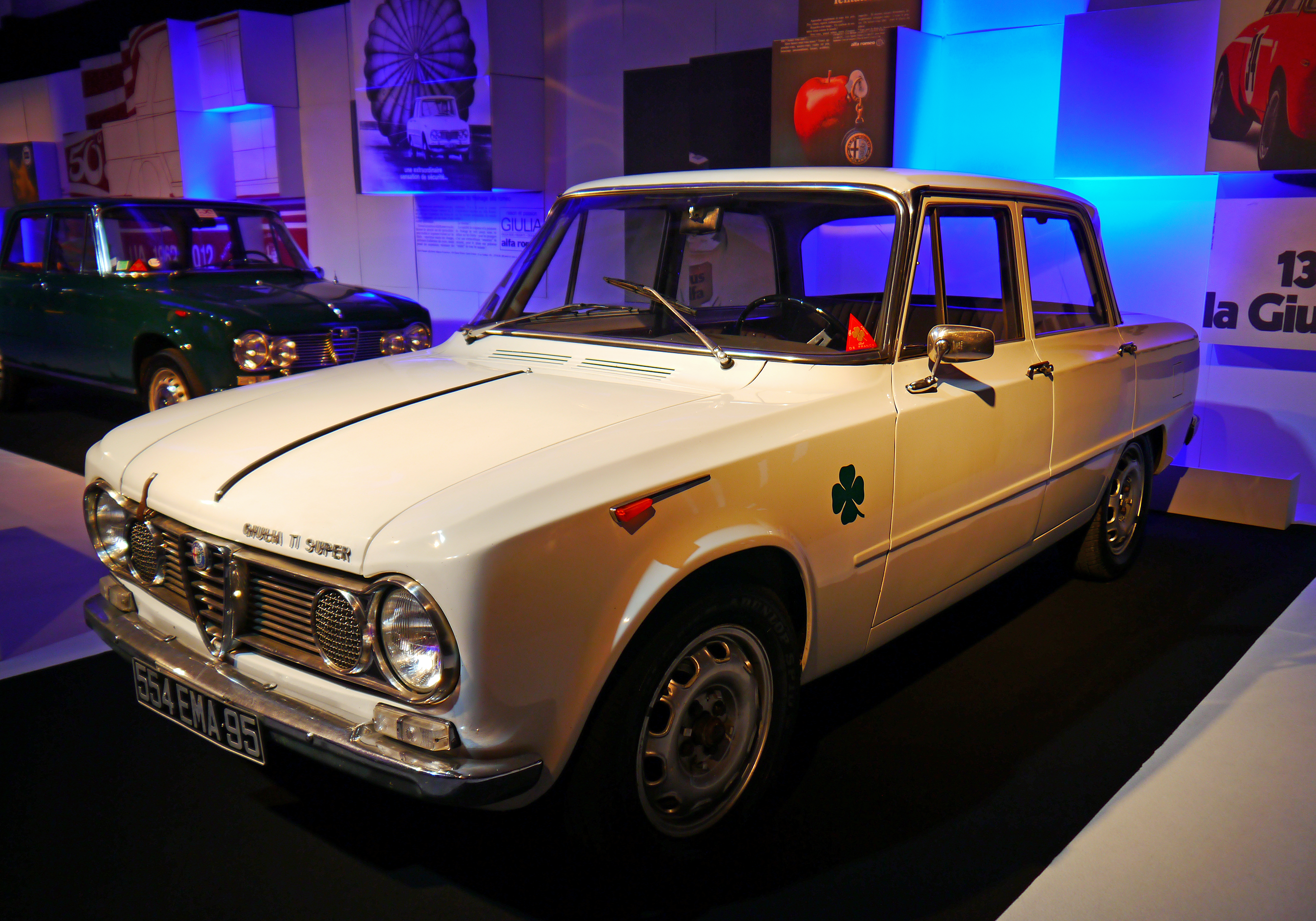
Alfa Romeo Giulia TI Super of 1964, the first production car to wear the quadrifoglio

As if to confirm the importance of the quadrifoglio, a few months later on September 8, 1923, a tragic accident occurred in which Sivocci lost his life at the Monza raceway. During practice for the 1st Grand Prix of Europe, Sivocci crashed in his Alfa Romeo P1 No. 17. His P1 did not have the quadrifoglio due to complications that had prevented the painting of the bodywork. The fact that he crashed in a vehicle that lacked the quadrifoglio made a lasting impression among the pilots, mechanics and technicians of the world of competitions. For the same superstitious reasons the number 17 was no longer assigned to Italian racing cars after this crash. Even in the absence of official regulations, from the 1924 season the bodywork of racing Alfa Romeo autos were decorated with the green four-leaf clover. In memory of Sivocci, the white square was replaced by a triangle to signify his absence, and the symbol remains that way to this day. After World War II the quadrifoglio was used to distinguish particularly sporty versions of production Alfa Romeos, appearing for the first time on the side of the Giulia TI Super of 1963, also called Giulia Quadrifoglio. This was a variant of the Giulia sedan devised for competition but regularly put on sale; it had green four-leaf clovers on its front wings, without the triangle.

== Nomenclature ==
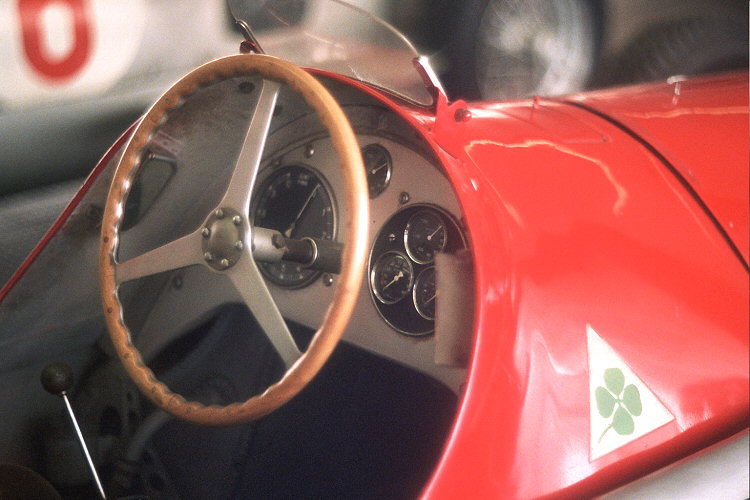
Quadrifoglio badge on the Alfetta 159

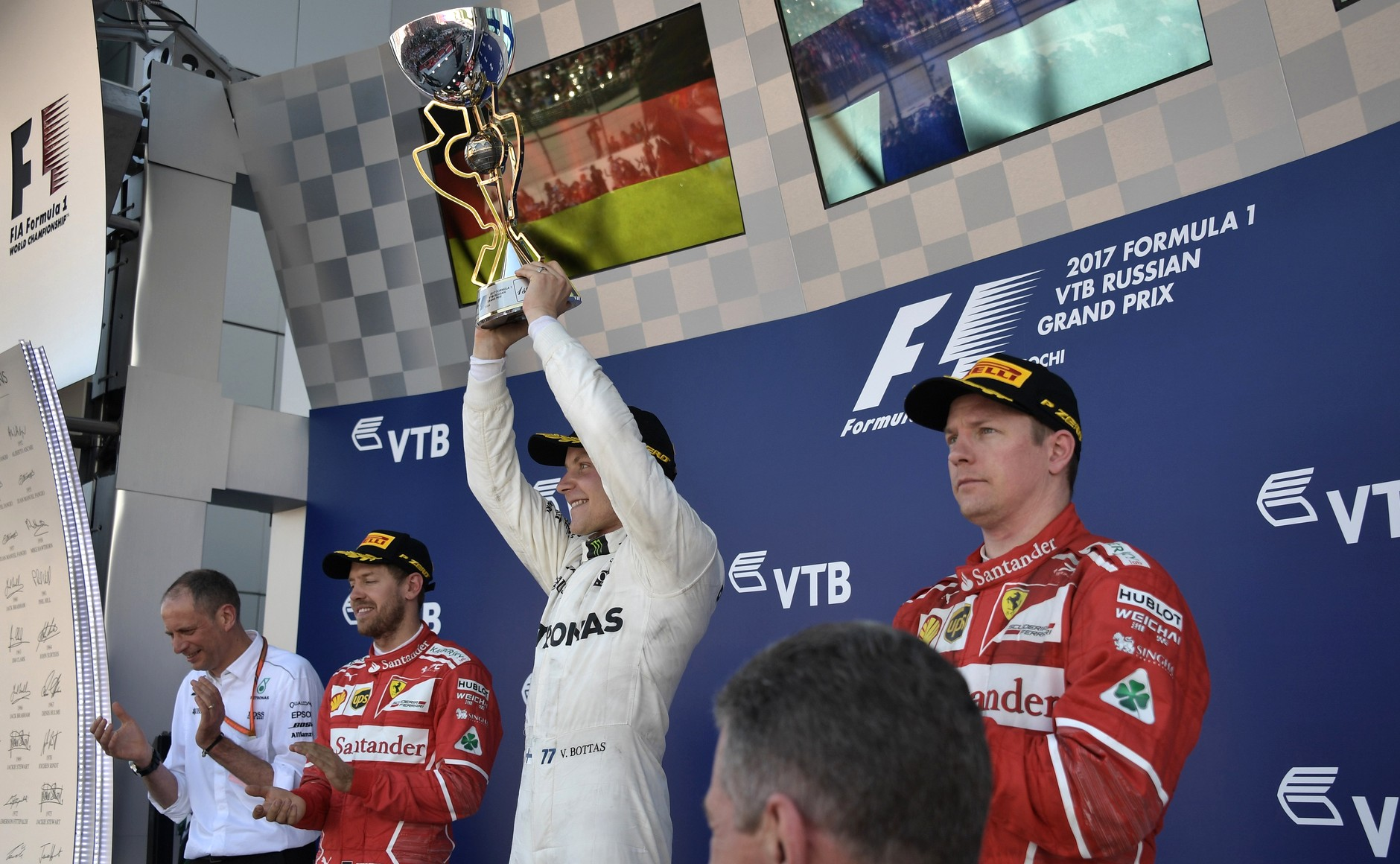
Quadrifoglio badge on the overalls of Sebastian Vettel and Kimi Räikkönen

In the 1970s Quadrifoglio Verde ('green four-leaf clover') became the trim level for each model's sportiest variant, equipped with the most powerful engine. It is often abbreviated QV. The Alfasud, Sprint, 33, 75, Spider, 164 and 145 all had Quadrifoglio Verde versions. Also in the 1970s and through the 1980s golden four-leaf clover badges were used to denote the most luxurious and well-equipped variants of Alfa Romeo cars, named Quadrifoglio Oro ('gold four-leaf clover'). The Alfasud, Alfetta, Alfa 6, 90 and 33 had Quadrifoglio Oro versions. The Q4 name was also used originally introduced in 1992 on the Alfa Romeo 155 Q4 (turbocharged 4 wheel drive, top of line version), and on the badge the Q was stylized as a cloverleaf, so it meant Quadrifoglio 4. Since the introduction of 155 Q4, the Q4 badge is used to mark Alfa Romeo all wheel drive vehicles. The same Q4 marking is also used on some new Maserati all wheel drive variants. In 2016 Volkswagen's Audi made trademark swap with FCA, so that Q4 badge can now be used in Audi cars.

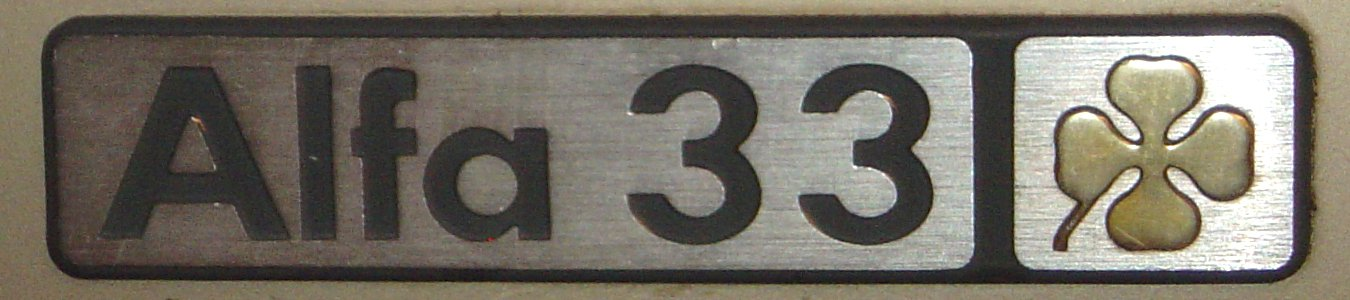
The Quadrifoglio Oro logo of an Alfa 33

More recently the quadrifoglio badge was revived on the 2007 Alfa Romeo 8C Competizione and Spider eight-cylinder sports cars. With the Alfa Romeo MiTo in 2012 and Giulietta in the early 2010s, the Quadrifoglio Verde was reinstated as the sportiest trim level in the range, and green four-leaf clovers on the front wings once again became the hallmark of high-performance Alfa Romeos. Current Alfa Romeo models to wear the Quadrifoglio badge are the high performance versions of the Giulia and Stelvio. The Quadrifoglio trim of the Giulia brings it from a 280 horsepower 2.0-liter turbocharged I4, to an impressive 505 horsepower 2.9-liter twin-turbo V6. The Quadrifoglio Stelvio is equipped with the same 2.9-liter twin-turbo V6. Although the verde adjective is not used with these models, the QV abbreviation is still often used informally when referring to them, for example Alfa Romeo Giulia QV. As of 2017, the Quadrifoglio badge was seen on the Ferrari SF70H formula 1 car and the suits of Kimi Räikkönen and Sebastian Vettel. As of 2018, the Quadrifoglio was seen in Alfa Romeo Sauber F1 Team, and from 2019 until 2023 it was seen also in the Alfa Romeo Racing Formula One team.

== See also ==
- Alfa Romeo in motorsport
- Prancing Horse

== Bibliography ==
- Everardo Dalla Noce (7 March 1983). "Alfa Romeo Notizie" (in Italian). No. 45.
- Baldwin, Nick (1987). "Alfa Romeo". The World Guide to Automobile Manufacturers. New York: Facts on File. pp. 18–21. ISBN 0816018448.
- Martera, Eugenio; Pietrogrande, Patrizia (2008). Il mito della velocità (in Italian). Firenze: Giunti. ISBN 9788809059665.
- Massaro, Sergio (2006). Alfa Romeo: cuore sportivo - La storia, lo sport, le granturismo (in Italian). Firenze: Giunti. ISBN 9788809046573.
- AA.VV. (2011). Alfa Romeo - Una favola moderna (in Italian). Spoleto: Lybra. ISBN 9788896309117.
