= Damin Spritzer =

American organist and academic

Damin Spritzer is an American organist and academic.

Since 2015, Spritzer has served as an assistant professor of organ at the University of Oklahoma. She also serves the Cathedral Church of Saint Matthew in Dallas as Artist-in-Residence for the Cathedral Arts series. She formerly served as adjunct professor at the University of North Texas before moving to Oklahoma. Between 2009 and 2014, Spritzer was the associate director of Music for University Park United Methodist Church in Dallas, Texas and Saint Rita Catholic Community, in Dallas, Texas, from 2000 until 2008. She has served on the board of directors for the Leupold Foundation, a charity for pipe organ music and culture. Spritzer is also active in the Southern Plains Chapter of the American Guild of Organists.

== Education ==
Spritzer received her doctor of musical arts degree from the University of North Texas, her MM in organ performance from the Eastman School of Music in Rochester, New York, studying with David Higgs, and her BM in organ performance from the Oberlin Conservatory of Music where she studied with David Boe, Haskell Thomson, Webb Wiggins, and Karel Paukert.

== Published recordings ==
By the end of 2023, Dr. Spritzer had recorded seven commercial CDs for Raven Recordings.

She has released three world-premier CDs of the organ music of Alsatian-American organist and composer René Louis Becker for the commercial label Raven Recordings. The first was recorded in Pithiviers, France at the church of Saint-Salomon et Saint-Grégoire on the Aristide Cavaillé-Coll organ Parish records there mention the first organ was installed in 1623, which was enlarged in 1784 and 1786 by Jean-Baptiste Isnard, each time incorporating the existing pipework and adding to the case. In 1889, the firm of Cavaillé-Coll restored the organ. Again in 1960, Robert Boisseau made another restoration, and from 2005 to 2008, Bertrand Cattiaux undertook the final and most elegant restoration and renovation of this instrument, which is classified as an “Historic Monument.”

Spritzer's second disc was recorded in Orléans, France, at the Basilique Cathédrale Sainte-Croix d'Orléans on a restored 1880 Cavaillé-Coll organ restored by Bernard Hurvy. The third volume was recorded in Denver, Colorado, at Saint John's Cathedral on the Platt-Rogers Kimball organ.

In addition to focussing her doctoral dissertation on Becker's work, Spritzer has published Volumes I of a continuing multi-volume edition of Becker's organ music, with an extended preface written by her.

== Performances ==
Spritzer's performances have spanned several continents and included historic churches and instruments such as the Nicolaikirche in Leipzig, Germany; the Terra Sancta Festival in Israel, Sainte-Croix in Orléans, France; at Igreja Nossa Senhora de Fátima and Peroqua Nossa Senhora da Boa Viagemin in São Paulo, Brazil; the La Verna Festival in Italy; New York City at St. Patrick's Cathedral; and with organist Aaron David Miller at the Walt Disney Concert Hall in Los Angeles.

Additional performances include the University of Houston 2012 Conference on Historical Eclecticism: Organ Building and Playing in the 21st Century; and other performances throughout the United States, including the Meyerson Symphony Center in Dallas, the 2017 International Trombone Festival in Redlands, California, and conventions of the American Guild of Organists, where she presented lectures and recitals in Houston and Austin, Texas, and was a featured recitalist at the 2018 American Guild of Organists National Convention in Kansas City in June, 2018.
