= Elizabeth Bell (composer) =

American composer (1928–2016)

- Born: December 1, 1928; Cincinnati, Ohio
- Died: December 19, 2016 (aged 88); Tarrytown, New York
- Era: Classical

Elizabeth Bell (December 1, 1928 – December 19, 2016) was an American composer.

== Life and education ==
Elizabeth Bell was born in Cincinnati in 1928. She was awarded her Bachelor of Arts degree in music from Wellesley College in 1950, and went on to earn a Bachelor of Music in composition from Juilliard in 1953. She studied under composers Peter Mennin and Vittorio Giannini at Juilliard, and later with Paul Alan Levi. From 1971 to 1975 Bell worked as the music critic of the Ithaca Journal in Ithaca, New York. Her music has been performed throughout the world. She was a founding member of New York Women Composers, Inc., and served on the Board of Governors of American Composers Alliance. Bell was also strongly involved with the International Alliance of Women in Music. Elizabeth Bell died on December 19, 2016, in Tarrytown, New York.

== Family ==
Bell married astronomer and astrophysicist Frank Drake in 1952 and, with him, had three sons, though they divorced in 1976. In 1983 she married Robert E. Friou, with whom she would go on to found New York Women Composers, Inc. in the following year.

== Awards and commissions ==
- 1986 First prize for Perne in a Gyre
- 1996 Grand prize for Spectra, Utah composers competition
- 1994 Delius prize for Duovarios, Jacksonville, Florida

Bell has had numerous commissions including

- The New York State Council on the Arts
- The Bradshaw/Buono duo
- The Inoue Chamber Ensemble
- The North/South Consonance
- The Putnam Valley Orchestra
- The Vienna Modern Masters
- Max Lifchitz

Of an Eleanor Elkins recital Bell said:

"My piece, Night music, was something of a revelation. Max Lifchitz (who commissioned it) has played it numerous times, and recorded it on the Vienna Modern Masters label. His interpretation is brilliant and satisfying. Eleanor's was entirely different: also brilliant, but more sombre and angry, more suggestive of 'night music.' I like them both, and am delighted to have Ms. Elkins' interpretation on tape."

== Works ==
- Andromeda (1993)
- Arecibo Sonata (1968)
- Concertino For Chamber Orchestra (2015)
- Concerto For Orchestra (1976)
- Duovarios (1987)
- Fantasy-Sonata (1971)
- Kaleidoscope – (1969)
- Les Neiges D'antan – Sonata For Violin And Piano (1998)
- Loss Songs (1983)
- Millennium (1988)
- Night Music (1990)
- Perne In A Gyre (1984)
- Rituals For Orchestra (1988)
- River Fantasy (1991)
- Second Sonata (1972)
- Six Loss-Songs (1983)
- Soliloquy For Solo Cello (1980)
- Soliloquy For Solo Violin (1980)
- Songs Of Here And Forever (1970)
- Spectra (1989)
- String Quartet #1 (1957)
- Summer Suite (1982)
- Symphony No. 1 (1971)
- Variations & Interludes (1952)
