= Anton Miller =

American violinist and violin pedagogue (born 1963)

Anson Miller
- Genres: Classical
- Instrument: Violin

Anton Miller is an American violinist and violin pedagogue who has appeared throughout the United States and abroad as a soloist, chamber musician, recitalist, and educator. He has premiered and commissioned works for the violin by Xiaogang Ye, Mario Gavier, and Errollyn Wallen.

== Career ==
Anton Miller made his Carnegie Hall debut in 1992 and two years later gave the world premiere performance of Xiaogang Ye’s Last Paradise for violin and orchestra in Beijing, China, with the Central Philharmonic Orchestra. Miller has been concertmaster for thirty years with the Lincoln Symphony Orchestra and also with the New Jersey Festival Orchestra, performing many solo concerti with both of those orchestras.

He is active as a chamber musician and performs regularly with violist Rita Porfiris as the Miller-Porfiris Duo.

== Professional activities ==
Anton Miller is currently Professor of Violin at The Hartt School. He previously has served on the faculty of New York University, the Oberlin Conservatory, Lawrence University, and Swarthmore College.

Miller was a founder and Artistic Director of the Three Bridges International Chamber Music Festival in Minnesota, and a co-Artistic Director of the Silver Bay Festival. He is currently co-Director of Music of the Point CounterPoint High School session for chamber musicians. Past and current festival summer faculty positions also include Foulger International Music Academy, the Intensive String Quartet Workshop at New York University, Aria International Academy, the Hawaii Performing Arts Festival, Musicorda, Killington, Hot Springs, and New Arts Festival domestically; and, internationally, the Festival Eterna Primavera in Cuernavaca (Mexico), the Summer Festival of Thessaloniki (Greece), Hsing Tian Kong (Taiwan), Bearstown (Korea), and the Harpa International Chamber Academy (Iceland).

== Discography ==
- Xiaogang Ye’s Last Paradise (1994)
- Franz Mittler's "Chaconne" and other works of Mittler performed with Con Brio Ensemble (1999); Mittler: "Lieder; Trio; Characteristic Pieces," (2005)
- The Complete Brahms Sonatas with pianist Brandt Fredriksen (2002)
- Five Postcards (2010) (as the Miller-Porfiris Duo), music for violin and viola by composers of the Americas: Errollyn Wallen, Libby Larsen, Mario Diaz Gavier, and Heitor Villa-Lobos with violist Rita Porfiris
- Kurt Weill's Violin Concerto (released 2012)
- Eight Pieces (2013) (as the Miller-Porfiris Duo), music by Reinhold Glière and Max Bruch for violin and viola with violist Rita Porfiris
- Divertimenti (2016) (as the Miller-Porfiris Duo), music by Bohuslav Martinů, Ernst Toch and Robert Fuchs for violin and viola with violist Rita Porfiris
