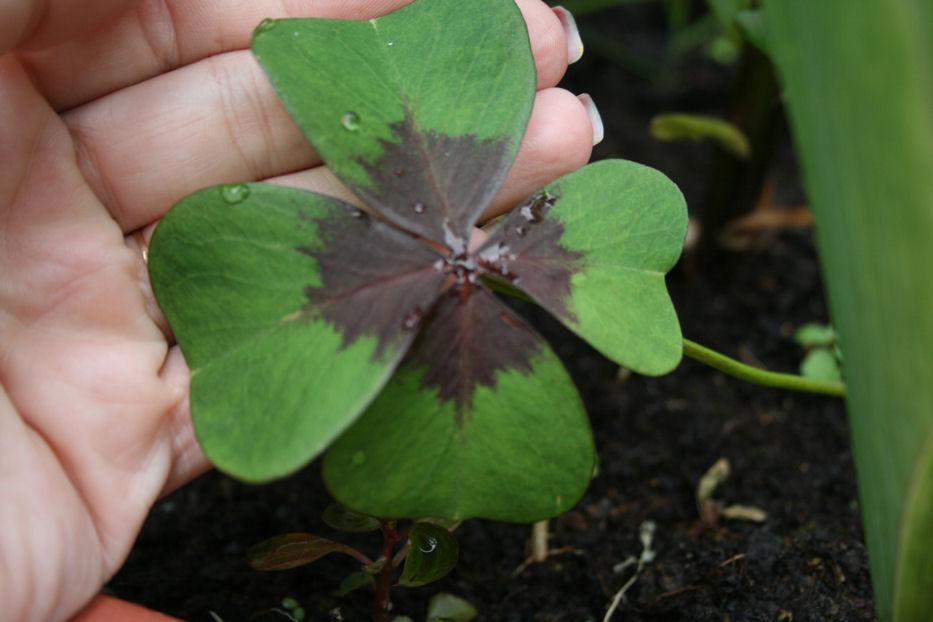
- A single leaf showing its 4 leaflets

Scientific classification
- Kingdom: Plantae
- Clade: Tracheophytes
- Clade: Angiosperms
- Clade: Eudicots
- Clade: Rosids
- Order: Oxalidales
- Family: Oxalidaceae
- Genus: Oxalis
- Species: O. tetraphylla

Binomial name
- Oxalis tetraphylla Cav.

Synonyms
- Oxalis deppei Lodd. ex Sweet

= Oxalis tetraphylla =

Species of flowering plant

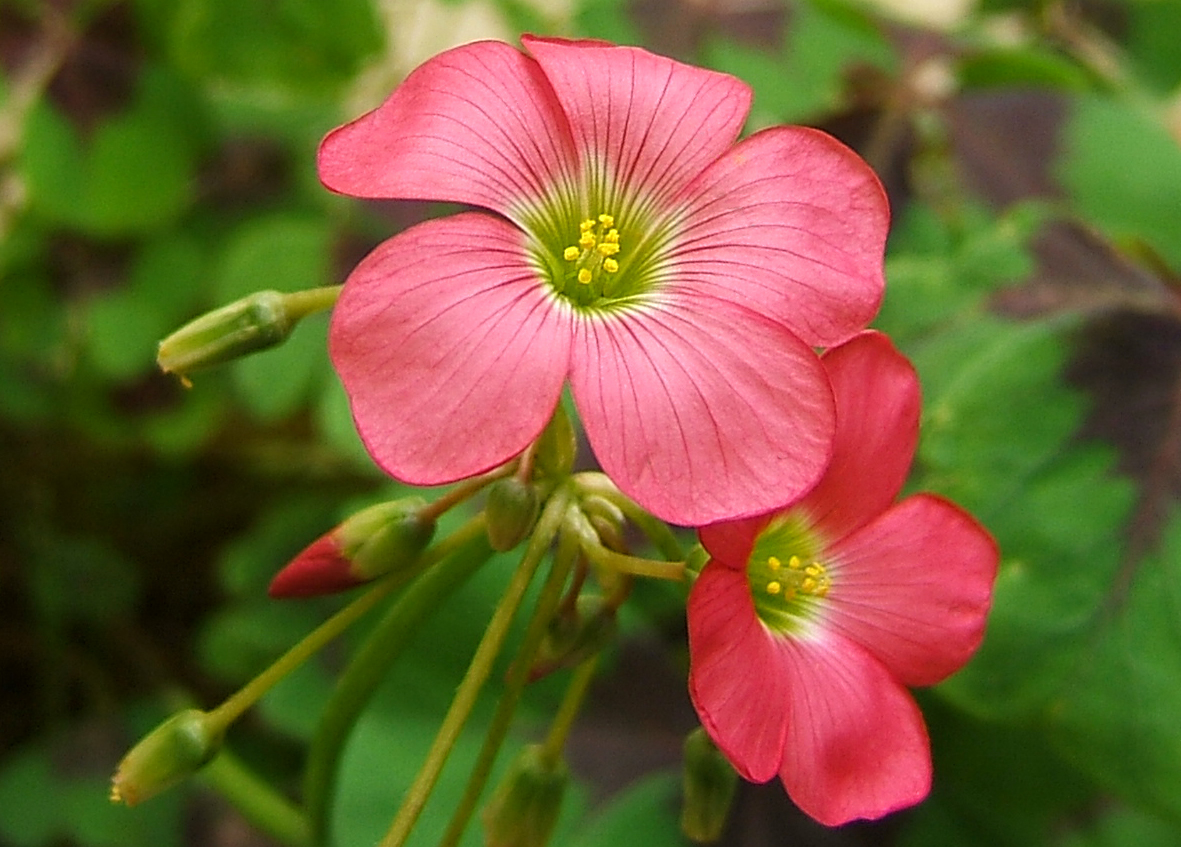

Oxalis tetraphylla (often traded under its synonym O. deppei) is a bulbous herbaceous perennial plant from Mexico. It is sometimes sold as lucky clover or shamrock (though it is neither a clover nor a shamrock). In the wild or feral state it is often called four-leaved wood-sorrel after its family, Oxalidaceae. Other English common names for this plant include Lucky Clover, Four-Leaf Sorrel, Four-Leaf Pink-Sorrel and others. It is sometimes called "the iron cross plant" or "oxalis iron cross" because the leaves loosely resemble the iron cross symbol, though this name is not a classic folk term and has fallen out of favour due to the bad political connotations associated with this symbol.

It is in the same genus as the common wood-sorrel (Oxalis acetosella) and has three wild variants: var. tetraphylla (autonym) distributed in the states of Veracruz, México, Morelos and Michoacán, var. mexicana native to Hidalgo and Guerrero regions and var. guerreroensis native to Oaxaca, Guerrero, Michoacán and Colima regions.

== Cultivation ==
Oxalis tetraphylla var. tetraphylla is the variety most commonly used as an ornamental plant, either potted or in gardens as ground cover. The other two variants are very similar and their green parts (and flowers) look practically identical. All variants of this plant are also edible, the flowers and leaves having a sharp lemon flavour. However, since the oxalic acid in the plant can interfere with the absorption of certain nutrients in the body, especially calcium, too much can be harmful.

- Hardiness zones: 7 - 10
- Heat zones: 8 - 9
- Climate zones: 7 - 24
- Lifecycle: Bulbous perennial
- Propagation: It multiplies through bulb divisions or through seeds.
- Sun exposure: Full sun, Partial sun, does not tolerate shade
- Water needs: Average
- Soil drainage: well-drained, bulb rot can occur is the soil is soggy
- Soil type: Chalk, Clay, Loam, Sandy
- Soil pH: from acid to alkaline (6.1 - 7.8), acidity lowers nutrient intake
- Additional nutrients: Are usually unnecessary, only for plants growing in nutrient-poor environments or small pots. Use slow-release fertilisers when the plant is not dormant or NPK 5-10-5 type fertilisers in late-spring to encourage blooming.
- Height: 6" - 1' (15 cm - 30 cm)
- Spread: 4" - 6" (10 cm - 15 cm)
- Depth: 3" (7 cm)
- Uses: Edging, Ground cover, Patio and Containers

If planted in early spring it will grow and flower throughout spring and summer. Some bulbs can survive a cold winter but in areas with deep frost they should be kept in a cool dry place over winter and replanted in the spring. The bulbs will multiply by autumn.
