= Four-leaf clover =

Rare mutation of the common 3-leaf clover said to bring good luck

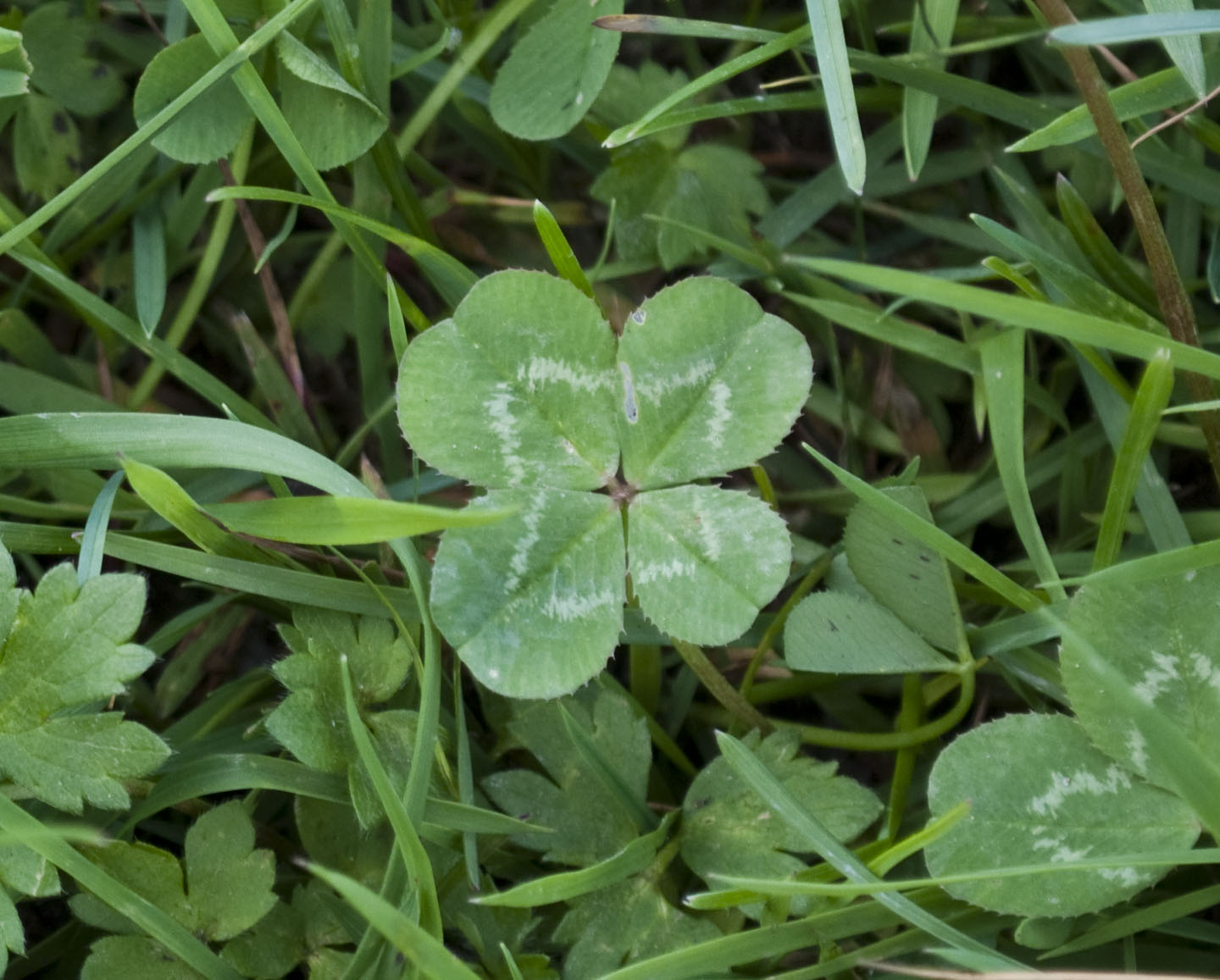
4-leaf white clover (Trifolium repens L.)

The four-leaf clover is a rare mutation of the common three-leaf clover that has four leaflets instead of three. According to tradition, such clovers bring good luck, a belief that dates back to at least the 17th century. (Note: One of the earliest recorded instances is Sir John Melton's 1620 play Astologaster, where Melton states in a list of superstitious beliefs and rituals "that if a man walking in the fields, finde any foure-leaued grasse, he shall in a small while after finde some good thing.")

The term four-leaf is botanically a misnomer, as clover plants have multiple leaves (multiple clovers), each consisting of a varying number of leaflets, typically three.

== Occurrence ==
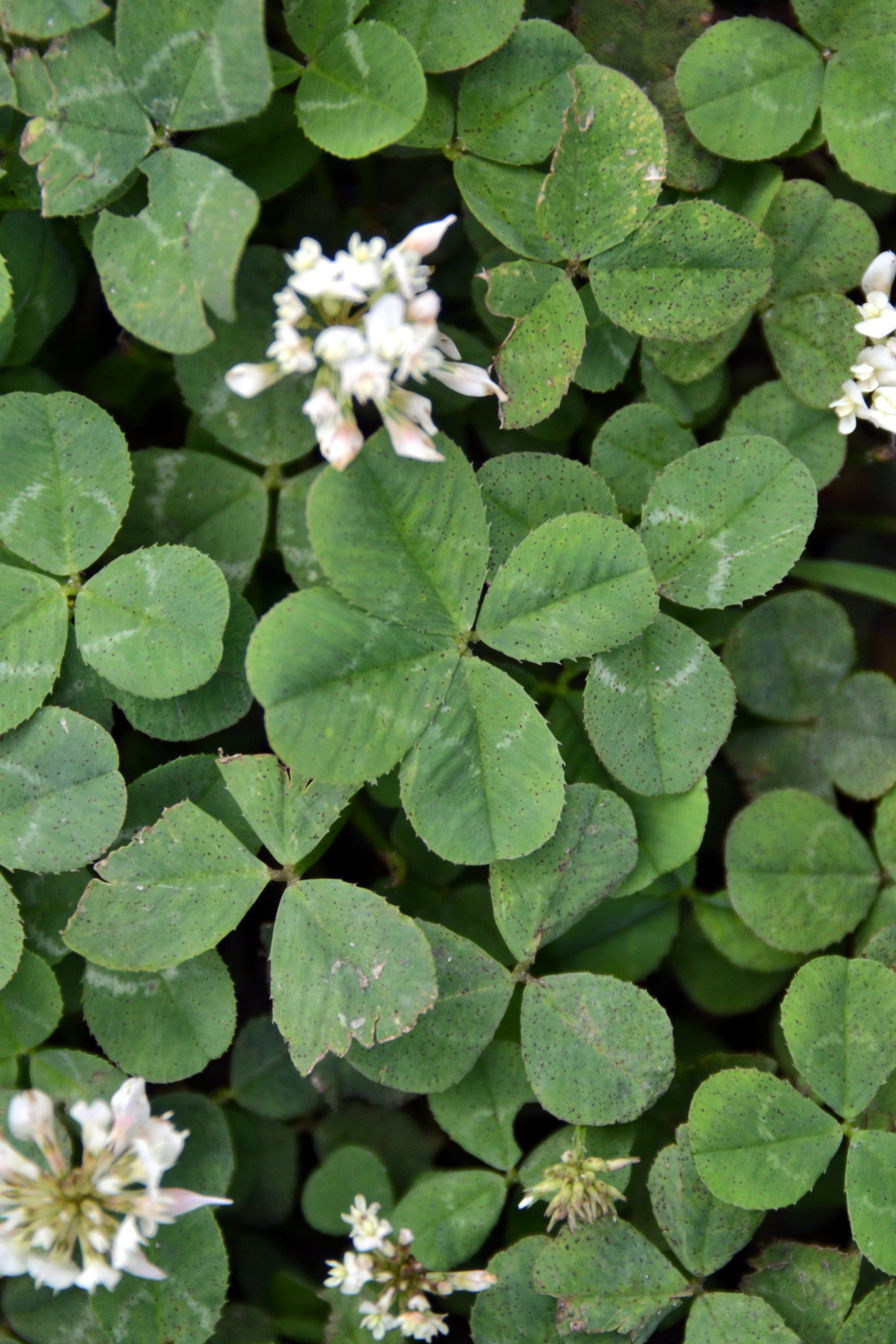
A 4-leaf clover amongst others with three leaflets

While all clover species (genus Trifolium) may produce four leaves, the most notable and widely spread is the white clover, Trifolium repens L.

Clovers can also develop more than four leaflets, with 5-leaf clovers less commonly found naturally than 4-leaf clovers; however, they have also been successfully cultivated. Some 4-leaf clover collectors, particularly in Ireland, regard the 5-leaf clover, known as a rose clover, as a particular prize.

A 2017 survey of approximately 5.7 million clovers in six European countries found the frequency of 4-leaf clovers to be around 5000 to 1 (one 4-leaf clover for every 5076 normal 3-leaf clovers), almost twice the commonly stated probability of 10,000 to 1. According to this survey, the frequency of a 5-leaf clover is 24,390 to 1, and that of a 6-leaf clover is 312,500 to 1.

=== Records ===
According to Guinness World Records, the clover with the most leaflets ever found had 63 of them, and was discovered by Yoshiharu Watanabe of Nasushiobara city, Tochigi prefecture, Japan, on 2 August 2023. The clover was from the species white clover (Trifolium repens L.); beating the previous record, a 56-leaf clover (of the same species) found by Shigeo Obara of Hanamaki city, Iwate prefecture, Japan, on 10 May 2009. Both men obtained clovers with such a number of leafleats through crossbreeding clover plants with a high rate of clovers with an abnormal number of leaflets, causing that, on average, cloverplants generated clovers with a higher and higher number of leaflets in each generation. Shigeo Obara used the method of natural crossbreeding, while Yoshiharu Watanabe used both natural crossbreeding and manual crossbreeding.

In 2019, American Gabriella Gerhardt set the record for collecting the most 4-leaf clovers in one hour by an individual (451). Previously, in 2018, she set the record for finding the most 4-leaf clovers in eight hours by an individual (887). On 1 January 2023, she certified two more records: the largest collection of 6-leaf clovers (1,437, surpassing the previous record of 43) and the largest collection of 7-leaf clovers (209, surpassing the previous record of 17). In 2023, she broke the record for the largest collection of 4-leaf clovers with 118,791, exceeding the previous record of 111,060 held by American Edward Martin. In total Gabriella Gerhardt holds five Guinness World Records.

== Cause ==
Possible causes for four-leaf clovers include genetic factors and environmental ones. Its relative rarity (1 in ~5,000 clovers) suggests a possible recessive gene appearing at a low frequency. Alternatively, four-leaf clovers could be caused by somatic mutation or a developmental error of environmental causes. They could also be caused by the interaction of several genes that happen to segregate in the individual plant. It is possible all four explanations could apply to individual cases. This means that multiple four-leaf clovers could be found in the same cloverplant, and a cloverplant that already has a clover with an abnormal number of leaflets has a higher chance of growing or having another abnormal clover than a cloverplant that doesn't have any.

Researchers from the University of Georgia have reported finding the gene that turns ordinary three-leaf clovers into the coveted four-leaf types. Masked by the three-leaf gene and strongly influenced by environmental conditions, molecular markers now make it possible to detect the presence of the gene for four-leaves and for breeders to work with it. The study also located two other leaf traits in the white-clover genome: the red fleck mark and red midrib, a herringbone pattern that streaks down the center of each leaflet in a bold red color. The genes were mapped to nearby locations, resolving a century-old question as to whether these leaf traits were controlled by one gene or two separate genes. White clover has many genes that affect leaflet color and shape, and the three in the study were very rare. These traits can be quite attractive, particularly if combined with others, and can turn clover into an ornamental plant for use in flower beds.

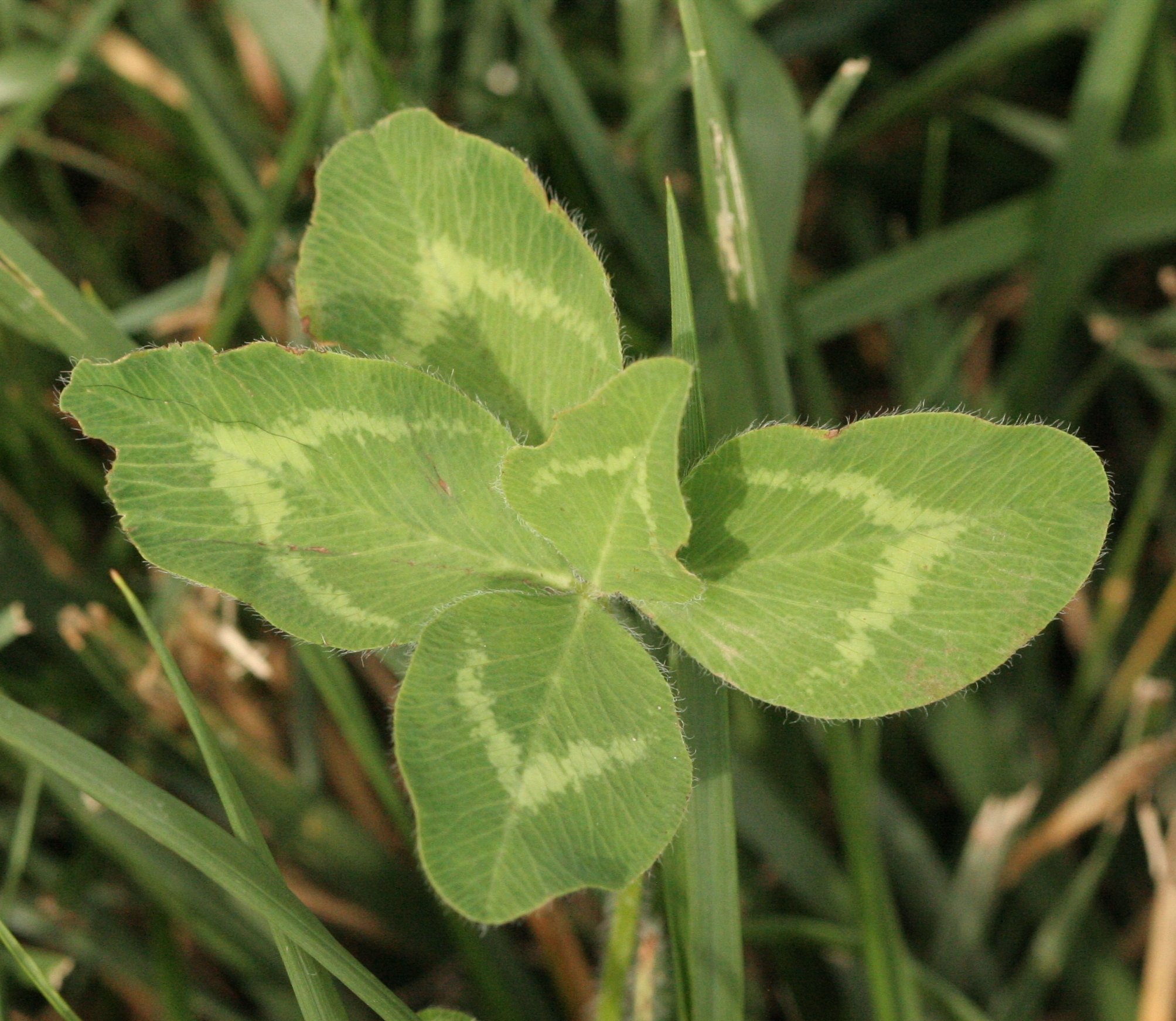
A red clover (Trifolium pratense L.) with five leaflets

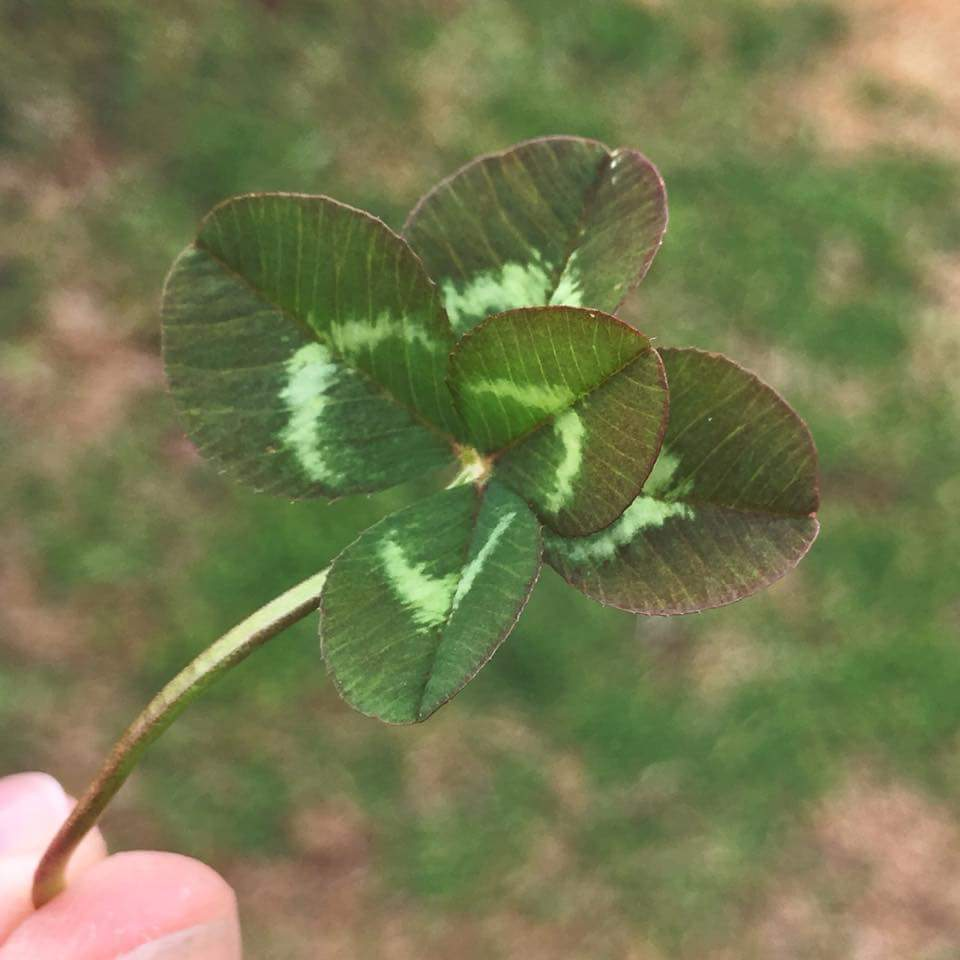
A five-leaf clover of Trifolium repens with a reddish hue

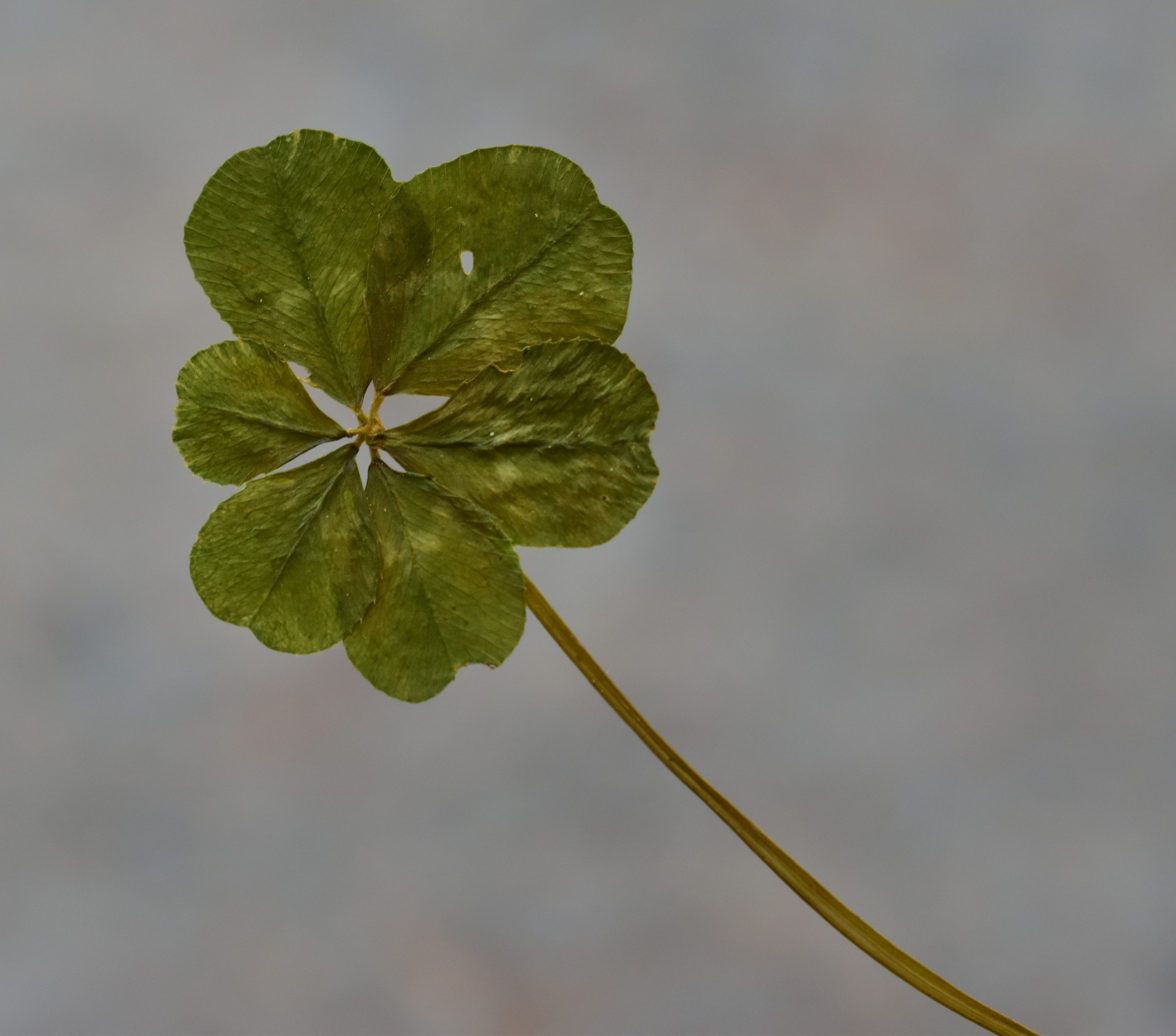
A pressed-dried six-leaf clover of Trifolium repens

Phosphates (a common ingredient in fertilizers) have been proven to play a role in the frequency of development of four-leaf clovers in cloverplants. A plant hormone called auxin, which plays an important role in plant development, has also been shown to increase the probability of mutations in clovers, especially the development of clovers with more than four leaflets. According to an experiment made in 2019 by a Japanese high-schooler, four-leaf clovers seem to be more likely to appear in well-fertilized soil. The study achieved clovers with five to eight leaflets (within a ten-day span) using double of the regular dose of phosphate fertilizer and seeds from a cultivar that produces clovers with four leaflets more frequently. Auxin was also given to the plants with their water, with a concentration of 0.7%.

There are reports of farms in the US which specialize in four-leaf clovers, producing as many as 10,000 a day (to be sealed in plastic as "lucky charms") by introducing a genetically engineered ingredient to the plants to encourage the aberration (there are, however, widely available cultivars that regularly produce leaves with multiple leaflets – see below).

Exposure of white clover flowers to radiation has been proven to increase the production of 4-leaf clovers of the offspring – see below.

== Multi-leaved cultivars ==
There are some cultivars of white clover (Trifolium repens) which regularly produce more than three leaflets, including purple-leaved T. repens "Purpurascens Quadrifolium" and green-leaved T. repens "Quadrifolium".

Some clovers have more spade-shaped leaves, rather than the usual rounded ones. This may be a genetic mutation. Some other genetic mutations in clovers include a rusty color on the leaves. Trifolium repens "Good Luck" is a cultivar which has three, four, or five green, dark-centered leaflets per leaf.

A 2009 study exposed white clover flowers during the pollination stage to gamma ray irradiation, developing a Trifolium repens cultivar that produced up to 60% four leaf clovers.

== Other species ==
Other plants may be mistaken for, or misleadingly sold as, "4-leaf clovers"; for example, Oxalis tetraphylla is a species of wood sorrel with leaves resembling a 4-leaf clover. Other species that have been sold as "4-leaf clovers" include Marsilea quadrifolia.

== In culture ==
=== As a good luck charm ===
A description from 1869 says that 4-leaf clovers were "gathered at night-time during the full moon by sorceresses, who mixed it with vervain and other ingredients, while young girls in search of a token of perfect happiness made quest of the plant by day." In an 1877 letter to St. Nicholas Magazine, an 11-year-old girl wrote, "Did the fairies ever whisper in your ear, that a 4-leaf clover brought good luck to the finder?"

=== As a hobby ===
Collecting 4-leaf clovers has become a hobby for many people, evidenced in numerous communities existing on the internet dedicated to the practices of finding and collecting hundreds of clovers with four or more leaflets, or clovers with different mutations.

In an interview with the New York Times, an expert 4-leaf clover finder suggested that finding 4-leaf clovers is easiest in spring before the first mowing. The expert's technique involved visually scanning clover patches for visual "ruptures in the pattern", as 3-leaf clovers make a triangular shape, while 4-leaf clovers make a square shape.

=== Meanings ===
Some folk traditions assign a different attribute to each leaflet of a clover. The leaves have been used by Christians to represent hope, faith, love and luck. Others say that 4-leaf clovers granted the power to see fairies.

=== Symbolic usage ===
4-leaf clover pictured in the coat of arms of Lääne-Nigula Parish

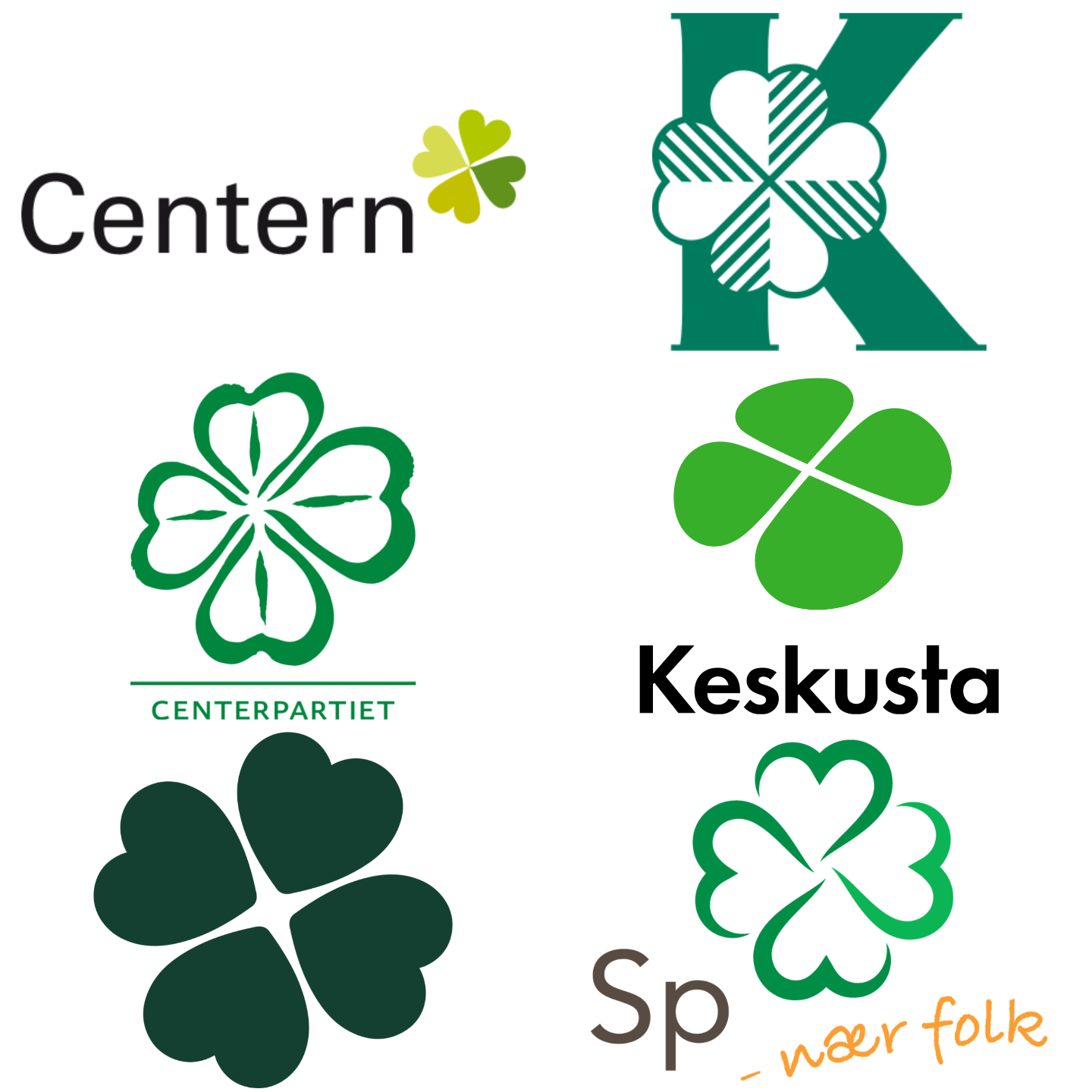
The 4-leaf clover is used as a symbol by multiple agrarian political parties in Northern and Eastern Europe.

- Italian automobile maker Alfa Romeo uses a quadrifoglio (4-leaf clover) icon to delineate its racing cars and performance-oriented road models. This tradition started in the 1923 Targa Florio race, when driver Ugo Sivocci decorated his car with a green clover on a white background. As of 2022, the quadrifoglio is used on the company's race liveries.
- American space exploration company SpaceX includes a 4-leaf clover on each space mission embroidered patch as a good luck charm. Inclusion of the clover has become a regular icon on SpaceX's flight patches ever since the company's first successful Falcon 1 rocket launch in 2008, which was the first mission to feature a clover "for luck" on its patch.
- Celtic Football Club, an association football team from Glasgow, Scotland, have used the four leaf clover as the club's official badge for over 40 years.
- Former Japanese video game developer studio Clover Studio used a 4-leaf clover as their logo.
- The global network of youth organizations 4-H uses a green 4-leaf clover with a white H on each leaf.
- The logo of the New Jersey Lottery features an outline of the state in white on a green 4-leaf clover printed on a lottery draw machine ball.
- The imageboard 4chan features a 4-leaf clover in its logo as a nod to its predecessor, the Japanese site Futaba Channel (2chan), whose name means two leaves, leading 4chan to be referred to in Japan as yotsuba, meaning four leaves.
- Traditional symbol of agrarian parties popularized by Republican Party of Farmers and Peasants, Bulgarian Agrarian National Union, People's Party, and International Agrarian Bureau in interwar period. Used until today among others by Polish People's Party, Estonian Centre Party, and Nordic agrarian parties.
- In Japan, the Green Cars of Shinkansen use a 4-leaf clover logo.
- Japanese animation studio CloverWorks uses a 4-leaf clover as their logo.

== See also ==
- Shamrock
- Fern flower
