= Benjamin Dwight Allen =

American composer and organist

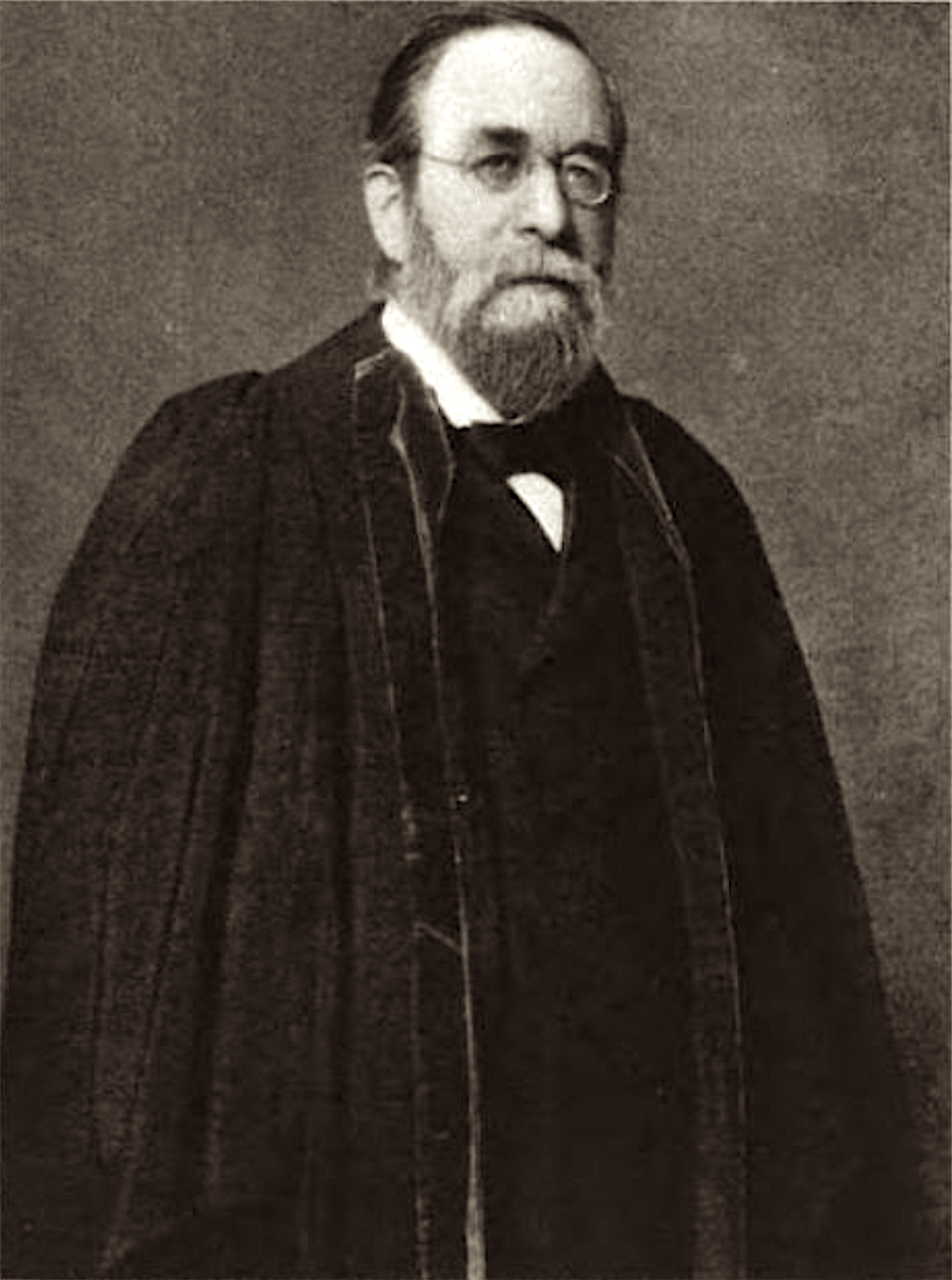
Benjamin Dwight Allen

Benjamin Dwight Allen (February 16, 1831, in Sturbridge, Massachusetts – March 4, 1914, in Wellesley, Massachusetts) was a composer and organist. His parents, Alvan and Lucy, were natives of Massachusetts. He had three siblings, Albert, Eliza, and Bridget. He was an organist for Congregational churches and gained attention in the nineteenth century.

Allen was educated in New York City, Boston, and Worcester, Massachusetts. Starting in 1845 onwards, he worked as both a teacher and an organist. From 1857 to 1894, he served as an organist and a choir director for the Union Congregational Church. In 1858, he founded the Worcester Music Festival. From 1871 to 1876, he taught at the Boston Conservatory. After 1894, he led the music department at Beloit college in Wisconsin and, from 1902 to 1905, worked as an organist at the Manhattan Congregational Church in New York City.

He died in the home of his daughter on March 4, 1914.
