= Christian Hudson =

Canadian singer-songwriter

Christian Hudson (born 1996) is a Canadian singer-songwriter from Airdrie, Alberta. He gained international fame for his single "Four Leaf Clover" in 2017. Hudson was the winner of the 2015 Calgary Stampede Talent Search, where the then 18-year-old donated his prize money to charity. In the fall of 2017, he completed his first national tour across Canada.

== Discovery and development ==
Hudson earned the top prize of $10,000 in the 2015 Calgary Stampede Talent Search after his performance of Nina Simone's Be My Husband. After his win, he donated his prize to a Calgary homeless shelter. This gesture earned praise from international media outlets as well as judge and businessman turned philanthropist W. Brett Wilson who was moved to donate to the shelter as well.

His first single, "Four Leaf Clover," made its way onto mainstream Canadian airwaves in summer 2017 after garnering 2 million Spotify streams in Canada. It has been remixed by internationally renowned DJ Benny Benassi. The single was certified Gold in 2022 by Music Canada.
