= New York Women Composers, Inc. =

The New York Women Composers, Inc. (NYWC) is a professional organization for women composers. The organization is meant to create opportunities for performing, recording, networking and mentoring for its members and aims to benefit all women composers. The organization also works for the full inclusion of women composers' work into concert repertoire.

== History and activities ==
The association was founded by Elizabeth Bell, Lucy Coolidge, Ann Callaway and Robert Friou in 1984. Membership is open to women composers of serious concert music who are residents of New York City and the greater New York City metropolitan area. It is also open to members of occupations that support the recognition of women as composers. The New York Women Composers, Inc., is recognized as a resource for women seeking support for their compositions.

The organization produces premiere and performance events. It also produces media programs to increase recognition of women composers, such as Here and Now: An Explanation of the Creative Mind, 1988. The group also publishes a catalog of music by women composers to allow easier access by musicians and directors seeking works for performance, and presents awards for support of women's compositions.

== Grants ==
The New York Women Composers, Inc., supports women composers in the state of New York by providing annual Seed Money Grant Program awards of $750 each for concerts or CD recording projects that support performance of music by NYWC members.

== See also ==
- Women in music
- Women's music
