= Max Lifchitz =

Mexican-American composer and musician

Max Lifchitz (born 1948 in Mexico City) is a classical pianist, composer, and conductor.

Lifchitz was born and grew up in Mexico City. After one year of study in Mexico, he moved to the United States in 1966 and graduated from The Juilliard School of Music and Harvard University. He has appeared in concert and recital throughout the US, Latin America and Europe. In 1980, he founded the North/South Consonance Ensemble, which is dedicated to the performance of contemporary classical music from the Americas; he serves as the ensemble's director.

Lifchitz has served on the faculty of Columbia University and the University at Albany, The State University of New York.

Max Lifchitz was awarded first prize in the 1976 International Gaudeamus Competition for Performers of Twentieth Century Music held in the Netherlands.

== Compositions ==
- Mosaicos, flute, oboe, clarinet, violin, double bass and piano (1971)
- Roberta, orchestra (1973)
- Exploitations, solo double bass, chamber ensemble and tape (1975)
- Intervencion, violin and chamber orchestra (1976)
- Exceptional String Quartet, 4 double basses (players wear small sleigh bells on the wrist of right arm) (1977)
- Rhythmic Soundscape, piano and percussion (1978)
- Affinities, piano (pub. 1979)
- Transformations, cello (1979)
- Winter Counterpoint, flute, oboe, bassoon, viola and piano (1979)
- Yellow Ribbons #1, flute and piano (pub. 1981)
- Yellow Ribbons #6, flute and piano (pub. 1982)
- Yellow Ribbons #11, wind ensemble [2 fl, 2 cl, 2 ob, 2 hn, 2 bsn] (1982)
- Yellow Ribbons #12, chamber ensemble [2 fl, 2 ob, 2 cl, 2 bsn, 1 cntr-bsn, 3 horn, va, vc, db] (1982)
- Yellow Ribbons #13, clarinet (pub. 1982)
- Yellow Ribbons #15, chamber ensemble [fl, ob, cl, vln, vc, pf] (1982)
- Night Voices No. 3, oboe and piano (pub. 1984)
- Transformaciones 2, violin (pub. 1986)
- Yellow Ribbons #25, flute, alto sax, tenor trombone, percussion and double bass (pub. 1986)
- Pulsations, 4 percussionists (1988)
- Mosaico latinoamericano, flute and piano (1991)
- Explorations, double bass, chamber ensemble and tape

== Discography ==
- 1989 - Bronx Arts Ensemble (New World)
- 1995 - Of Bondage and Freedom (North/South)
- 1996 - Mexico: 100 Years of Piano Music (North/South)
- 1999 - Elan (North/South)
- 2003 - Carnaval/Carnival: Music from Brazil and the U.S. (North/South)
- 2003 - Millennium Overture: Music by American Composers (North/South)
- 2003 - Elizabeth Bell: Snows of Yesteryear (North/South)
- 2004 - American Tapestry (North/South)
