= North/South Consonance Ensemble =

- Origin: New York City, New York, U.S.
- Genres: Contemporary classical
- Years active: 1980–present
- Website: www.northsouthmusic.org

The North/South Consonance Ensemble is an American chamber ensemble dedicated to the performance of contemporary classical music from the Americas. It was founded in 1980 and is based in New York City. It is directed by the pianist and composer Max Lifchitz, who is also the ensemble's founder.

The ensemble has performed over 850 different works by composers from around the world and has released many CDs on its own label, North/South Recordings.

== See also ==
- Consonance
