= Charles Whitney Coombs =

American composer and organist

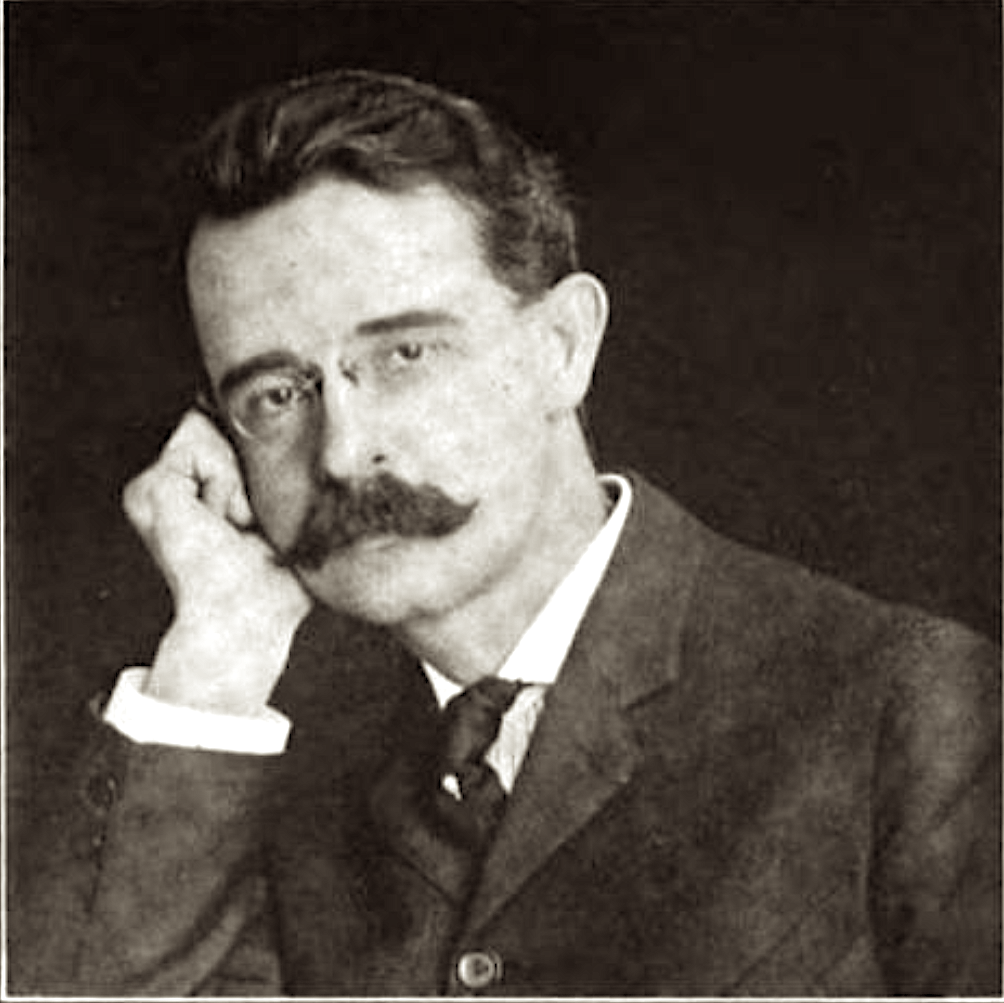
Charles Whitney Coombs

Charles Whitney Coombs (1859, Bucksport, Maine – 1940, Montclair, New Jersey) was an American composer and organist. He was prolific in both sacred and secular music.

== Works ==
- "The Four Leaf Clover"
