= Nevin (surname) =

The surname Nevin has several origins.

== Etymology ==
In some cases, Nevin derived from the Irish Mac Cnáimhín, meaning "son of Cnámhín". In other cases, the surname is derived from the Irish Ó Cnáimhín, meaning "descendant of Cnámhín". The personal name Cnámhín, meaning "little bone", from the Irish cnámh ("bone"), is derived from a byname referring to a thin man.

In other cases, Nevin is derived from the Irish and Scottish Gaelic Mac Naoimhín, a patronymic form of a personal name derived from a diminutive of naomh ("holy, saint"). (Note: A modern name derived from this word is the Irish Naomh.) The surname Nevin can also be derived from the Scottish Gaelic Naomhín, meaning "little saint", commonly Latinised as Nevinus.

Early bearers of forms of the surname Mac Cnáimhín include: Aithius mac Mic Cnaimhín, in 1159; Donell oge McCnauyne, and Donell begg McCnavin, in 1583; and Dorghan Macknavin, in 1585. Early bearers of forms of the surname Ó Cnáimhín include: Cornelius O'Knavin, in 1574; and Owen O'Knavine, in 1601. Early bearers of forms of the surname Mac Naoimhín include: Thomas filius Neuini, in 1295; Thomas Maknevin, in 1528; Thomas Nevin, in 1538.

One particular family that has borne the surname Mac Cnáimhín was a literary and medical kindred of Uí Maine, first recorded in 1159. Whilst the surname Mac Cnáimhín is associated with Galway, the surname Mac Naoimhín is associated with Leinster, and Argyll, and the surname Ó Cnáimhín is associated with Munster.

In 1881, in Britain, the surname Nevin was most common in Lancashire. In 1847–1864, in Ireland, the surname Nevin was most common in Galway. Between John Joe Nevin, David Nevin, Luke Nevin, Timothy Nevin, Daniel Nevin and others, there have been bare-knuckle boxers called Nevin among the traveler community since Victorian times.

== Notable people with the surname Nevin ==
- Annette Nevin (1939–2025), American academic
- Arthur Nevin (1871–1943), American composer
- Blanche Nevin (1841–1925), American artist and poet
- Bob Nevin (1938–2020), Canadian hockey player
- Brooke Nevin (born 1982), Canadian actress
- Courtney Nevin (born 2002), Australian soccer player
- Edwin Nevin (1814–1889), American educator
- Ethelbert Nevin (1862–1901), American pianist and composer
- George Balch Nevin (1859–1933), American composer and businessman
- George Niven (1929–2008), Scottish football player
- Gordon Balch Nevin (1892–1943), American musician
- John Niven, Scottish writer
- Johnny Nevin, Irish football player and hurler
- John Joe Nevin (born 1988), Irish boxer
- John Williamson Nevin (1803–1886), American theologian and educationalist
- Kate Nevin (died 1715), Scotswoman burnt as a witch
- Liam Nevin (born 1951), Irish writer
- Pat Nevin (born 1963), Scottish football player
- Phil Nevin (born 1971), American baseball player
- Robyn Nevin (born 1942), Australian actress
- Shannon Nevin (born 1976), Australian rugby player
- Thomas Edwin Nevin (1906–1986), Irish physicist and academic
- Tom Nevin (1916–1972), Australian rugby player
- Tyler Nevin (born 1997), American baseball player
