= Louis Ehlert =

German composer and music critic (1825–1884)

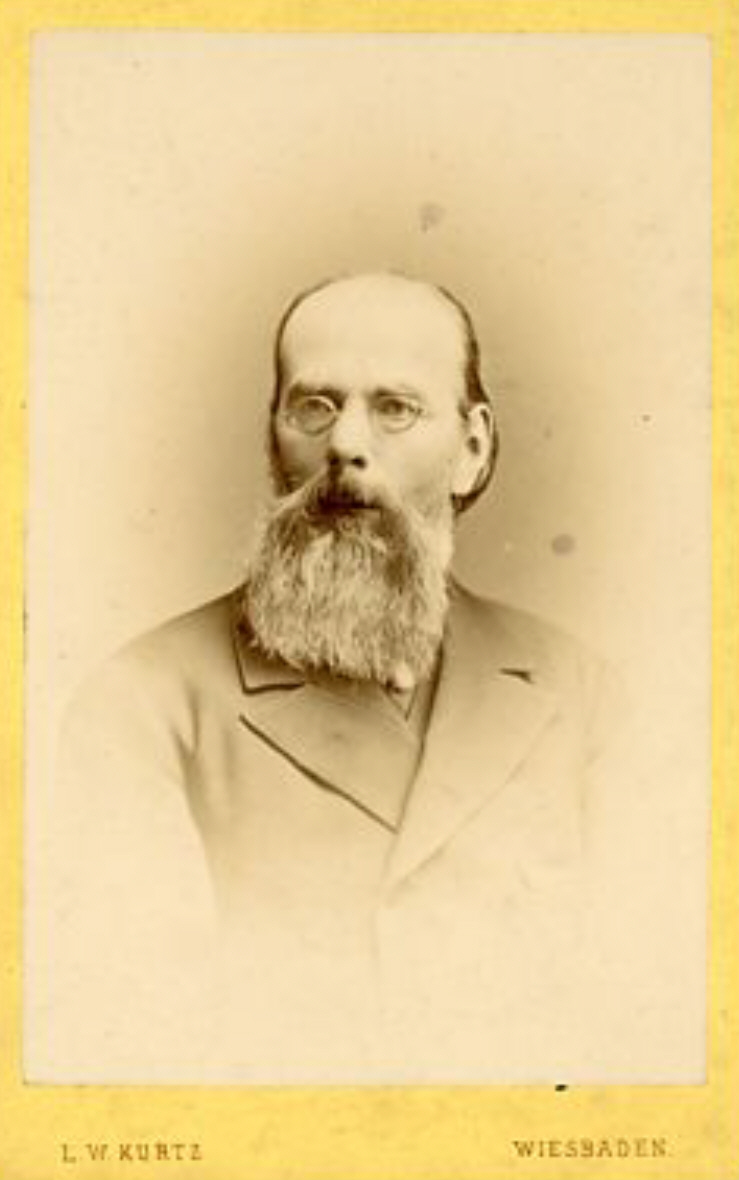
Louis Ehlert.

Louis Ehlert (23 January 1825 – 4 January 1884) was a German composer and music critic.

== Life ==
Born in Königsberg, Ehlert entered the Leipzig Conservatory in 1845, where he studied under Robert Schumann and Felix Mendelssohn. In 1850 he moved to Berlin where he was a critic and teacher. From 1869 until 1871 he taught at the Schule des höheren Klavierspiels founded by Carl Tausig. Later he taught in Meiningen where he tutored the princes, and finally in Wiesbaden. While in Berlin, Amy Fay studied with Ehlert from November 1869 until April 1870, when Ehlert and Tausig broke off their partnership.

Ehlert composed a Spring Symphony, an overture, and a Requiem for a Child, as well as numerous pieces for piano, choral works, and lieder. His book of essays, From the Tone World, was translated into English by Helen Tretbar.

Ehlert wrote a very positive article about Dvořák's Slavonic Dances which helped making them popular in Germany. As a token of his gratitude Dvořák dedicated to Ehlert the Serenade for Wind Instruments Op. 44.

He died in Wiesbaden.
