= Franz Abt =

German composer and conductor (1819–1885)

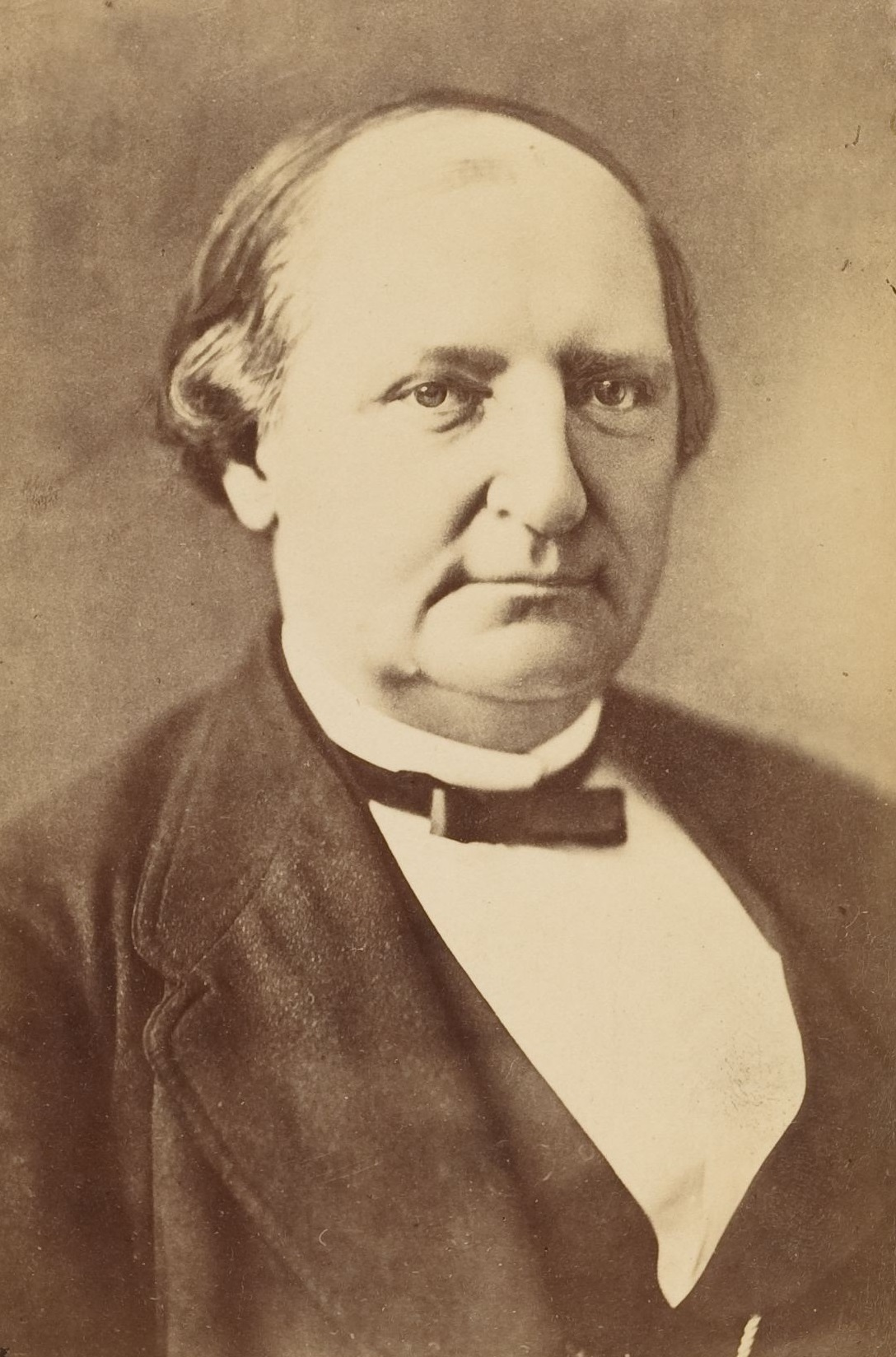
Franz Abt (Harvard Theater Collection)

Franz Wilhelm Abt (22 December 1819 – 31 March 1885) was a German composer and choral conductor. He composed roughly 3,000 individual works mostly in the area of vocal music. Several of his songs were at one time universally sung, and have obtained a more or less permanent place in the popular repertory. Abt was a renowned choral conductor, and he spent much of the last three decades of his life working as a guest conductor with choirs throughout Europe and in the United States.

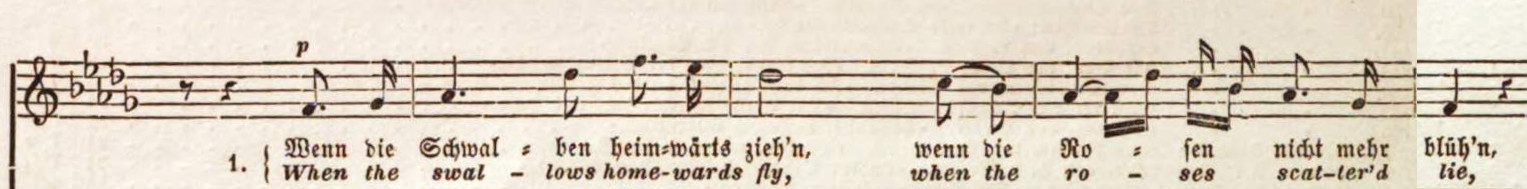
Incipit of the song "Wenn die Schwalben heimwärts zieh'n" op. 39 No. 1. by Franz Abt

== Biography ==
Abt was born at Eilenburg in Prussian Saxony, and showed musical talent at an early age. His father was a clergyman and a talented pianist, and it is he who gave Franz his earliest instruction in music. Like his father, Abt was interested in both music and theology, and he followed both pursuits at the Thomasschule Leipzig and Leipzig University with the ultimate intention of becoming a member of the clergy. While in school, Abt became friends with Albert Lortzing, Felix Mendelssohn, and Robert Schumann.

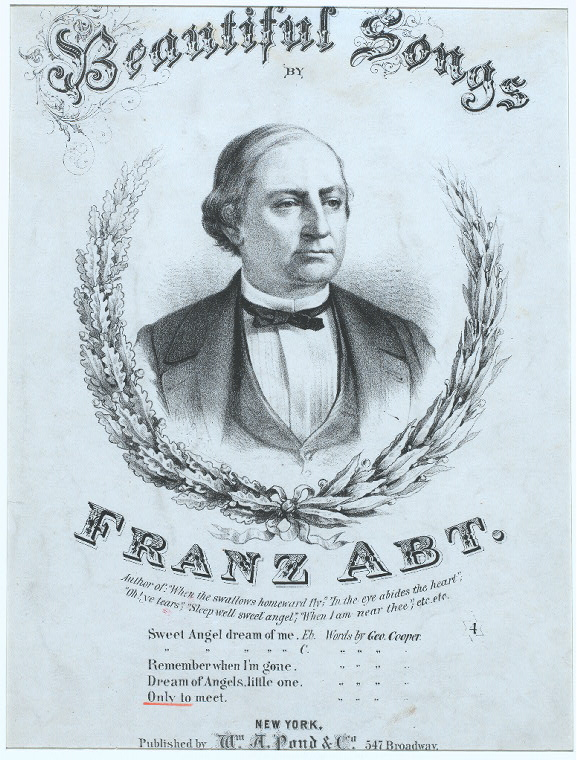
Portrait of Franz Abt, from the cover of an edition of his songs

Upon the death of his father in 1837, Abt abandoned his theological studies and decided to concentrate entirely on music. It is at this time that he began to compose and publish music, mostly works for the piano which were written for performance in Leipzig's salons. In 1841 Abt became kapellmeister at Bernburg, then moved to Zürich in the same year where he became an immensely popular and skilled choirmaster, often conducting his own compositions. While in Zürich he was appointed director of almost all of the city's numerous choral societies in succession, often winning prizes for them. In 1852 Abt returned to Germany to become musical director at the court theater in Braunschweig where he served until 1882.

Abt also remained active as a choral conductor during his time in Braunschweig. He was appointed director of the Hofkapelle in 1855, serving in that position for many years. He was also frequently invited to conduct choirs in many capital cities of Europe during the 1850s through the 1880s, having at this point developed an international reputation. He notably toured the U.S. in 1872 where he was received with overwhelming enthusiasm by music critics and the public alike. By 1882, his busy schedule wore him down to a state of ill health and he was forced to retire to Wiesbaden where he died in 1885. He is buried in the Südfriedhof (South Cemetery) In Wiesbaden.

== Music ==
When the Swallows Homeward Fly by Franz Abt
When the Swallows Homeward Fly by Franz Abt

Abt's compositions comprise more than 600 opus numbers which make up over 3,000 individual items. He was primarily a composer of vocal music and was particularly prolific in writing music for male choirs which he thought was lacking in sufficient literature. Indeed, his greatest successes in Germany and Switzerland were obtained in part-songs for men's voices. Abt was also successful in writing choral music for mixed choruses both a cappella and with either piano or orchestral accompianement. He also wrote numerous popular vocal art songs for solo voice, part songs for multiple voices, and several songs for children.

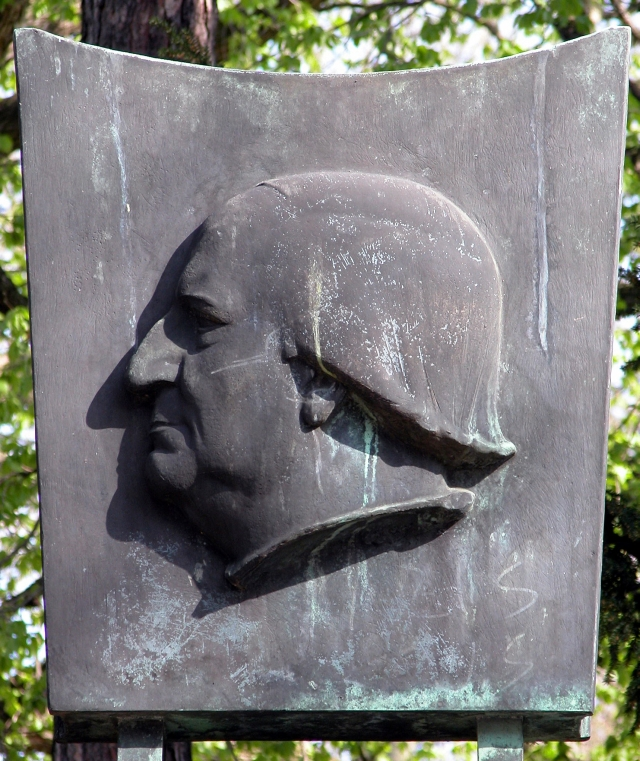
Franz Wilhelm Abt monument from 1960 in Braunschweig

Abt's compositional style betrays an easy fluency of invention, couched in pleasing popular forms, but without pretence to depth or individuality. Many of his songs, were at one time universally sung, and have obtained a more or less permanent place in the popular repertory. Several were translated into English by Helen Tretbar. Due to their simple and melodic style some of Abt's songs, such as Wenn die Schwalben heimwärts ziehn and Die stille Wasserrose are easily mistaken for genuine folksong.

Abt's other compositions include three operas: Des Königs Scharfschütz, Die Hauptprobe, and Reisebekanntschaften. In the early part of his life Abt composed much for the piano, chiefly pieces of light salon character. These have never had the same popularity as his vocal works.
