= SS Ethelbert Nevin =

Liberty ship of WWII

History

United States
- Name: Ethelbert Nevin
- Namesake: Ethelbert Nevin
- Owner: War Shipping Administration (WSA)
- Operator: Moore-McCormack Lines, Inc.
- Ordered: as type (EC2-S-C1) hull, MC hull 2486
- Awarded: 23 April 1943
- Builder: St. Johns River Shipbuilding Company, Jacksonville, Florida
- Cost: $1,063,745
- Yard number: 50
- Way number: 2
- Laid down: 1 June 1944
- Launched: 18 July 1944
- Sponsored by: Miss Doris Nevin
- Completed: 31 July 1944
- Identification: Call sign: WRRJ
- Fate: Laid up in the National Defense Reserve Fleet, Wilmington, North Carolina, 19 December 1947; Sold for scrapping, 19 February 1960, withdrawn from fleet, 13 March 1960

General characteristics
- Class & type: Liberty ship; type EC2-S-C1, standard
- Tonnage: 10,865 LT DWT; 7,176 GRT
- Displacement: 3,380 long tons (3,434 t) (light); 14,245 long tons (14,474 t) (max)
- Length: 441 feet 6 inches (135 m) oa; 416 feet (127 m) pp; 427 feet (130 m) lwl
- Beam: 57 feet (17 m)
- Draft: 27 ft 9.25 in (8.4646 m)
- Installed power: 2 × Oil fired 450 °F (232 °C) boilers, operating at 220 psi (1,500 kPa); 2,500 hp (1,900 kW)
- Propulsion: 1 × triple-expansion steam engine, (manufactured by General Machinery Corp., Hamilton, Ohio); 1 × screw propeller
- Speed: 11.5 knots (21.3 km/h; 13.2 mph)
- Capacity: 562,608 cubic feet (15,931 m^{3}) (grain); 499,573 cubic feet (14,146 m^{3}) (bale)
- Complement: 38–62 USMM; 21–40 USNAG
- Armament: Varied by ship; Bow-mounted 3-inch (76 mm)/50-caliber gun; Stern-mounted 4-inch (102 mm)/50-caliber gun; 2–8 × single 20-millimeter (0.79 in) Oerlikon anti-aircraft (AA) cannons and/or, 2–8 × 37-millimeter (1.46 in) M1 AA guns

SS Ethelbert Nevin was a Liberty ship built in the United States during World War II. She was named after Ethelbert Nevin, an American pianist and composer from Pennsylvania.

== Construction ==
Ethelbert Nevin was laid down on 1 June 1944, under a Maritime Commission (MARCOM) contract, MC hull 2486, by the St. Johns River Shipbuilding Company, Jacksonville, Florida; sponsored by Miss Doris Nevin, the daughter of the namesake, and was launched on 18 July 1944.

== History ==
She was allocated to the Moore-McCormack Lines, Inc., on 31 July 1944. On 19 December 1947, she was laid up in the National Defense Reserve Fleet, Wilmington, North Carolina. She was sold for scrapping, 19 February 1960, to Bethlehem Steel Co., for $70,161. She was removed from the fleet, 13 March 1960.

== Bibliography ==
- "St. John's River Shipbuilding, Jacksonville FL". www.ShipbuildingHistory.com. 16 October 2010.
- Maritime Administration. "Ethelbert Nevin". Ship History Database Vessel Status Card. U.S. Department of Transportation, Maritime Administration.
- Davies, James (May 2004). "Specifications (As-Built)" (PDF). p. 23.
- "SS Ethelbert Nevin".
