= Serenade for Wind Instruments (Dvořák) =

Serenade composed by Antonín Dvořák

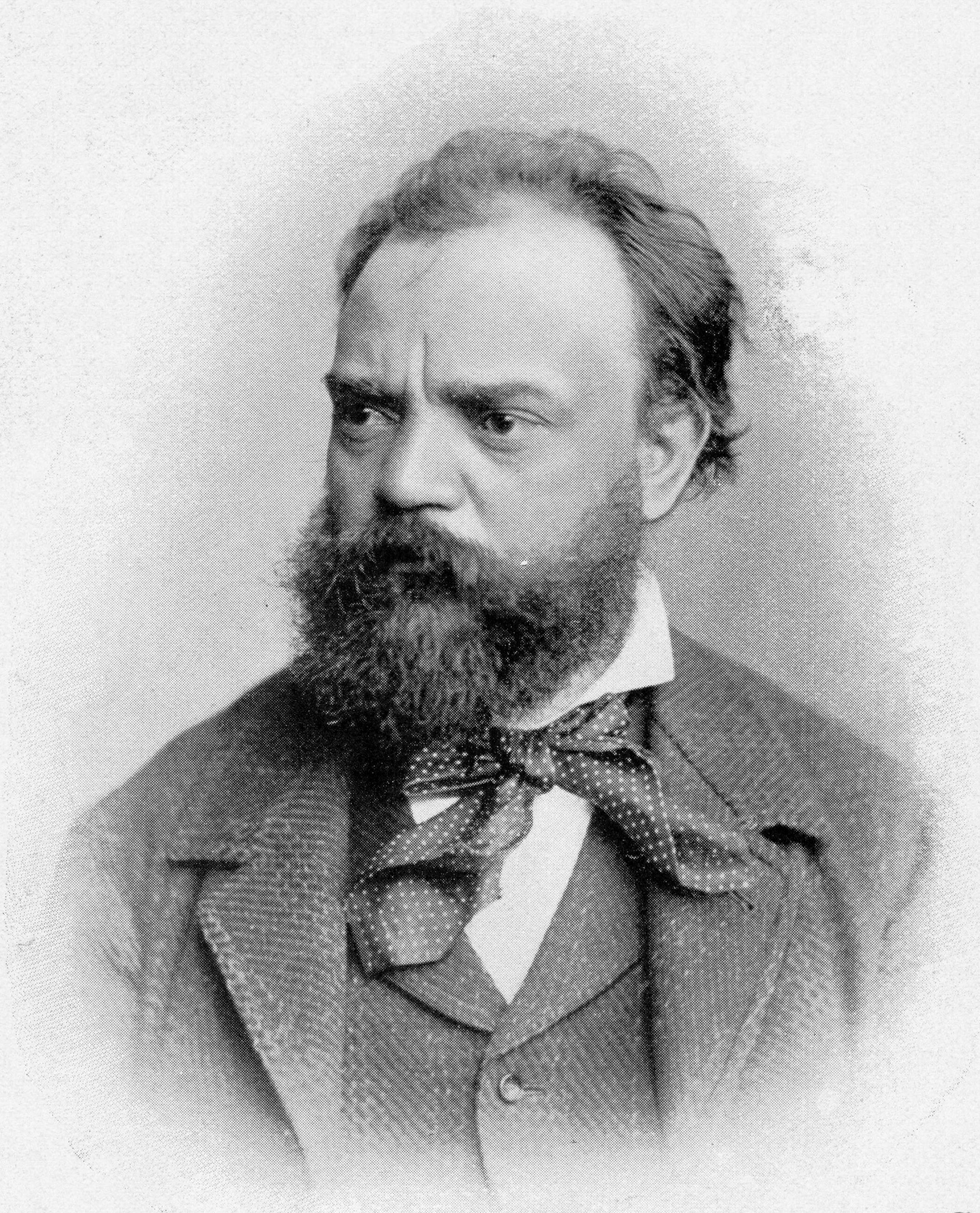
Antonín Dvořák in 1882

Serenade for wind instruments, cello and double bass in D minor (Czech: Serenáda pro dechové nástroje d moll), Op. 44, B. 77, is a chamber composition by the Czech composer Antonín Dvořák. The work is dedicated to the music critic and composer Louis Ehlert who praised the Slavonic Dances highly in the German press.

== Background ==
It was created in 1878, shortly after the première of the opera The Cunning Peasant, one of fifteen compositions he submitted for the Austrian State Stipendium award. The work was first heard on 17 November 1878 at a concert exclusively dedicated to Dvořák's works, with the orchestra of the Prague Provisional Theatre (Czech: Prozatímní). The composition was performed under the composer's baton.

The Serenade evokes the old-world atmosphere of musical performances at the castles of the Rococo period, where the worlds of the aristocracy and the common folk merged. It is composed in a 'Slavonic' style (shortly before the Slavonic Dances), though not quoting folksong directly; and the middle part of the second movement contains rhythms reminiscent of the furiant dance.

== Structure ==
I. Moderato, quasi marcia

II. Minuetto

III. Andante con moto

IV. Finale
Performed by the Virtual Philharmonic Orchestra (Reinhold Behringer) with digital samples

The serenade was performed in the Great Conservatory of Syon Park by the Hounslow Symphony Orchestra in 2026.

The work consists of four movements:

1. Moderato, quasi marcia
2. Minuetto. Tempo di minuetto
3. Andante con moto
4. Finale. Allegro molto

The serenade is written for two oboes, two clarinets, two bassoons, contrabassoon, three horns, cello and double bass. The string instruments were added later to enhance the force of the bass line. The contrabassoon part was attached ad lib, since in Dvořák's time it was not easy to obtain the instrument.

== In popular culture ==
An excerpt from the third movement is performed by a chamber ensemble in a scene from the film Iron Jawed Angels.

In the movie Crescendo, it is performed in an audition by an Israeli ensemble.

== Selected recordings ==
- Dvořák: Serenades in E major and in D minor. Supraphon (SU 3776-2 011) (Performed by the Czech Philharmonic Wind Ensemble)
