= Ethelbert Nevin =

American pianist and composer (1862–1901)

Ethelbert Woodbridge Nevin (November 25, 1862 – February 17, 1901) was an American pianist and composer.

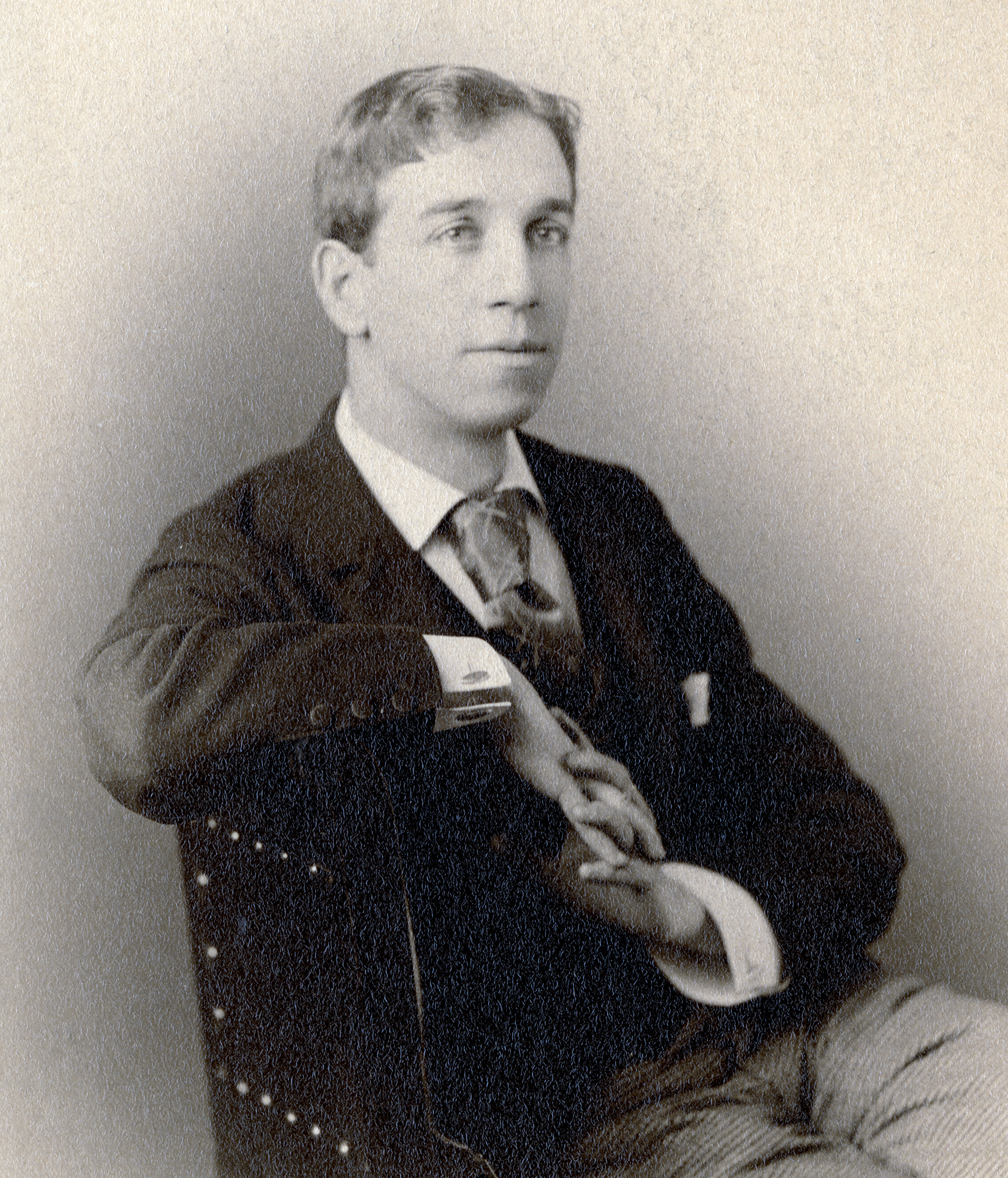
Ethelbert Nevin, ca. 1891

== Early life ==
Nevin was born on November 25, 1862, at Vineacre, on the banks of the Ohio River, in Edgeworth, Pennsylvania. There he spent the first sixteen years of his life, and received all his schooling, most of it from his father, Robert Peebles Nevin, editor and proprietor of a Pittsburgh newspaper, and a contributor to many magazines. (Robert Nevin also composed several campaign songs, among them the popular "Our Nominee," used in the day of James K. Polk's candidacy.) Nevin's mother, Elizabeth Duncan Oliphant, was a pianist. The first grand piano ever taken across the Allegheny Mountains was carted over for Nevin's mother. Other members of the Nevin family showed musical inclinations as well; Nevin's younger brother, Arthur, also achieved some renown as a composer, as did his cousins George and Gordon Balch Nevin.

=== Musical education ===
From a young age, Nevin was musically inclined. He began playing the piano by the age of four, although he needed cushions piled on the pedals to enable him to reach them. Nevin's father provided for his son both vocal and instrumental instruction. He also took him abroad for two years of travel and music study in Dresden under Von Böhme. In 1878, he attended Western University, now known as the University of Pittsburgh, but left at the end of his freshman year in 1879. Later he studied the piano for two years at Boston, under Benjamin Johnson Lang, and composition under Stephen A. Emery.

== Musical career ==
After two years studying in Boston, in 1882 Nevin moved back to Pittsburgh, where he gave lessons, and saved money enough to take him to Berlin. There he spent the years 1884, 1885, and 1886, placing himself in the hands of Karl Klindworth. Of him Nevin says: "To Herr Klindworth I owe everything that has come to me in my musical life. He was a devoted teacher, and his patience was tireless. His endeavor was not only to develop the student from a musical standpoint, but to enlarge his soul in every way. To do this, he tried to teach one to appreciate and to feel the influence of such great minds of literature as Goethe, Schiller, and Shakespeare. He used to insist that a man does not become a musician by practising so many hours a day at the piano, but by absorbing an influence from all the arts and all the interests of life, from architecture, painting, and even politics."

In 1885, Hans von Bülow incorporated the best four pupils of his friend, Klindworth, into an artist class, which he drilled personally. Nevin was one of the honored four, and appeared at the unique public Zuhören of that year, devoted exclusively to the works of Johannes Brahms, Franz Liszt, and Joachim Raff. Among the forty or fifty studious listeners at these recitals, Frau Cosima Wagner, the violinist Joseph Joachim, and many other celebrities were frequently present.

Nevin returned to America in 1887, and took up his residence in Boston, where he taught and played at occasional concerts.

In 1892 he went to Paris, where he taught singing, and he coached many American and French artists for the operatic stage. In 1893 he moved on to Berlin, where he worked so hard at composition that his health collapsed, and he spent a year in Algiers. The early months of 1895 he spent in concert tours through this country. As Klindworth said of him, "he has a touch that brings tears," and it is in interpretation rather than in bravura that he excels.

Seeking solitude and the right atmosphere for composition, he went to live in Florence, where he composed his suite May in Tuscany (Op. 21). After a year in Venice Nevin made Paris his home for a year, then returned to America, where he remained until his death.

His best-remembered compositions are the piano piece "Narcissus" from Water Scenes and the songs "The Rosary" (lyrics by Robert Cameron Rogers) and "Mighty Lak' a Rose" (lyrics by Frank Lebby Stanton).

== Personal life, death and commemoration ==
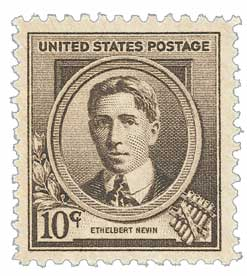
1940 Nevin stamp

Nevin was married to Anne Paul Nevin, with whom he had two children. The Nevin summer home, 'Arcady', in Blue Hill, Maine, is still owned by his descendants.

Despite being a prominent composer, Nevin had recurring debt towards the end of his life. This situation plagued Nevin with ongoing depression, accompanied by heavy drinking. He overworked himself at times, steadily deteriorating his health. On the night of February 15, 1901, while in New Haven, Connecticut, Nevin had attended a recital given by Harold Bauer. After returning home, however, his health worsened. He had shown symptoms of numbness in his hands, altering his ability to play the piano. On the morning of February 17, he was confined to his bed as his health was becoming more unpredictable. He died later that day on February 17, 1901 in New Haven, Connecticut, aged just 38.

Nevin was commemorated by being pictured on a 1940 ten cent U.S. postage stamp, one of the "Famous Americans" series.

== Piano pieces ==
- Lilian Polka (1874)
- Op. 2 Sketchbook (1888)
  - 1 Gavotte
  - 3 Love Song
  - 5 Berceuse
  - 7 Serenata
  - 9 Valse Rhapsodie
- Op. 6 Three Duets (1890)
  - 1 Valse Caprice
  - 2 Country Dance
  - 3 Mazurka
- Op. 7 Four Compositions (1890)
  - 1 Valser Gentile
  - 2 Slumber Song
  - 3 Intermezzo
  - 4 Song of the Brook
- Op. 8 Melody and Habanera for Violin and Piano (1891)
- Op. 13 Water Scenes (1891)
  - 1 Dragon Fly
  - 2 Ophelia
  - 3 Water Nymph
  - 4 Narcissus
  - 5 Barcarolle
- Op. 16 In Arcady (1892)
  - 1 A Shepherd's Tale
  - 2 Shepherds All and Maidens Fair
  - 3 Lullabye
  - 4 Tournament
- Op. 18 Two Études (1892)
  - 1 In the Form of a Romance
  - 2 In the Form of a Scherzo
- Barcarolle for Violin and Piano (1893)
- La Guitare (1896)
- Op. 21 May in Tuscany (1896)
  - 1 Arlecchino
  - 2 Notturno
  - 3 Barchetta
  - 4 Misericordia
  - 5 Il Rusignuolo
  - 6 La Pastorella
- Op. 25 A Day in Venice (1898)
  - 1 Alba
  - 2 Gondolieri
  - 3 Canzone amorosa
  - 4 Buona Notte
- Op. 30 En Passant (1899)
  - 1 A Fontainebleau
  - 2 In Dreamland
  - 3 Napoli
  - 4 At Home
- O'er Hill and Dale (1902)
  - 1 'Twas a Lover and His Lass
  - 2 The Thrush
  - 3 Love Is A-Straying, Ever Since Maying
  - 4 The Lark Is on the Wing

== Songs ==
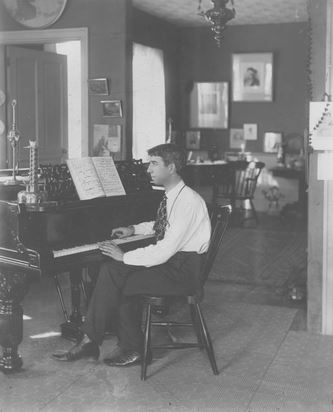
Ethelbert Nevin, c. 1900. This image is from the Ethelbert Nevin Collection and Archive housed and maintained by the American Center for Music at the University of Pittsburgh Library System, University of Pittsburgh

- Bed-Time Song (1887)
- Op. 2 Sketchbook (1888)
  - 2 Im Wunderschönen Monat Mai
  - 4 Du Bist Wie Eine Blume
  - 6 Lehn Deine Wang' an Meine Wang'
  - 8 Oh! That We Two Were Maying
  - 10 In Winter I Get Up at Night,
    Of Speckled Eggs the Birdie Sings,
    Dark Brown Is the River
- Op. 3 Three Songs (1888)
  - 1 Deep in a Rose's Glowing Heart
  - 2 One Spring Morning
  - 3 Doris
- Op. 5 Five Songs (1889)
  - 1 Herbstgefuhl
  - 2 La Chanson des Lavandieres
  - 3 'Twas April
  - 4 Raft Song
  - 5 Before the Daybreak
- Op. 9 Wynken, Blynken, and Nod (1890)
- Op. 12 Songs for Soprano or Tenor (1891)
  - 1 A Summer Day
  - 2 Beat Upon Mine, Little Heart
  - 3 In a Bower
  - 4 Little Boy Blue
  - 5 At Twilight
- Op. 17 Three Songs (1892)
  - 1 Hab' ein Roslein
  - 2 Le Vase Brise
  - 3 Rappelle-toi
- Op. 20 A Book of Songs (1893)
  - 1 A Fair Good Morn
  - 2 Sleep, Little Tulip
  - 3 Every Night
  - 4 Airly Beacon
  - 5 When the Land was White with Moonlight
  - 6 A Song of Love
  - 7 Nocturne
  - 8 Dites-moi
  - 9 Orsola's song
  - 10 In der Nacht
- The Rosary (1898)
- Op. 28 Songs from Vineacre (issued separately)
  - 1 A Necklace of Love (1899)
  - 2 Sleeping and Dreaming (1899)
  - 3 Mon dèsir (1899)
  - 4 The Nightingale's Song (1899)
  - 5 Dream-maker man (1900)
  - 6 La lune blanche (1900)
  - 7 Ein Heldenlied (1900)
  - 8 Ein Liedchen (1900)
- An African Love Song (1901)
- Mighty Lak' a Rose (1901)
  lyrics by Frank Lebby Stanton (1894)

== Ethelbert Nevin Collection ==
The University of Pittsburgh Ethelbert Nevin collection archives consist of the collection of manuscripts, recordings, memorabilia, and original hand-written scores that document his life, work and influence. The archives contains correspondence, commissioned commercial musical compositions, scores, recordings.

== Publications ==
- Rupert Hughes, Contemporary American Composers, Boston, 1900.
- Vance Thompson, The Life of Ethelbert Nevin, Boston, 1913.
- John Tasker Howard, Ethelbert Nevin, New York, 1935.
- Ngaio Marsh, Overture to Death, 1939, mentions a "Venetian Suite" by Nevin

== Legacy and honors ==
The World War II Liberty Ship SS Ethelbert Nevin was named in his honor.

== Bibliography ==
- Dorian, Frederick (1964). Commitment to culture: art patronage in Europe, its significance for America. Pittsburgh: University of Pittsburgh Press.
- Mulkearn, Lois; Pugh, Edwin V. (1954). A traveler's guide to historic western Pennsylvania. Pittsburgh: University of Pittsburgh, Digital Research Library.
