= Charles F. Tretbar =

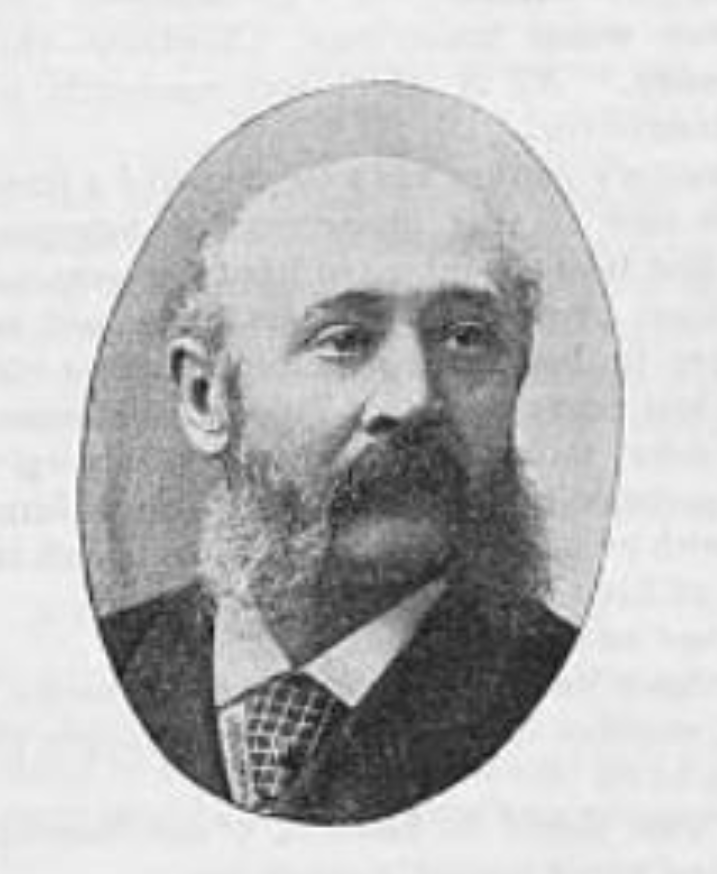
Charles F. Tretbar

Charles F. Tretbar (13 February 1832 – 3 June 1909) was a German-born American concert promoter and executive with the Steinway & Sons piano company.

== Life and career ==
Charles F. Tretbar was born on 13 February 1832 in Braunschweig, Germany. His father was first clarinet player of the Braunschweig Court Orchestra, and was considered a virtuoso on that instrument. He was educated in both business and music in Leipzig. He was a friend of composers Franz Liszt, Felix Mendelssohn, and Richard Wagner, and studied piano with Charles Mayer.

Tretbar moved to the United States in 1852 where he first settled in Baltimore working for a sheet music publisher. He continued to work in the music business after moving to Buffalo, New York where in 1855 his composition "Philopena Polka" was published. By 1857 he was working as a dealer of pianos and sheet music purveyor in Dubuque, Iowa. He relocated to Canada where he worked for the Nordheimer Piano and Music Company in Montreal.

In 1865 Tretbar left Montreal to join the staff of Steinway & Sons. He became a close confidant of William Steinway, and was his second in command at Steinway Hall. He was often used by Steinway in sensitive or difficult matters both in relation to the business and to personal matters. He was the only person outside the Steinway family who understood the family's business and wealth and was entrusted with managing the press and delivering subpoenas among other challenging tasks. This included acting on behalf of William in legal and personal matters relating to his divorce from Regina Roos Steinway.

In addition to serving in the post of treasurer at Steinway & Son, Tretbar was the head of the company's concert and artist department. As a concert promoter he organized United States tours for several prominent musicians, among them Rafael Joseffy, Ignace Paderewski, Adelina Patti, and Anton Rubinstein.

Tretbar became a naturalized American citizen on 17 August 1868. He was married to the writer and translator Helen Tretbar. In 1893 he published book The M. Steinert Collection of Keyed and Stringed Instruments which featured illustrations and descriptions of the many clavichords, claviers, harpsichords, spinets, and other instruments collected by Morris Steinert (many now in the Yale University Collection of Musical Instruments).

In 1905 Tretbar retired from Steinway & Son. He lived in Baden-Baden, Germany in retirement at the end of his life. He died there on 3 June 1909.
