= Frank Van der Stucken =

American composer and conductor

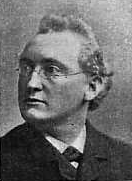
Frank Valentine Van der Stucken

Frank Valentine Van der Stucken (October 15, 1858 – August 16, 1929) was a Belgian-American composer, conductor, and founding conductor of the Cincinnati Symphony Orchestra in 1895.

== Biography ==
Van der Stucken was born in Fredericksburg, Texas as the youngest child of Frank and Sophie (née Schönewolf) Van der Stucken. His father Frank was a Belgian immigrant who had emigrated from Antwerp to Texas in 1852. Van der Stucken lived in Europe from 1866 to 1884. He studied at the Royal Conservatoire of Antwerp under Peter Benoit from 1875 to 1879, and at Leipzig from 1879 to 1881. He was kapellmeister of the Stadt Theater, Breslau, Germany, in 1882, later giving concerts of his own compositions, in Weimar and elsewhere in Germany, under the patronage of Liszt. Acting upon the advice of Max Bruch, he returned to the United States in 1884, and became the leader of the Arion Society of New York City, conducting novelty concerts in Steinway hall and symphonic concerts in Chickering hall. He gave a series of American concerts at the Paris exposition of 1889, made a concert tour in Europe with the Arion Society in 1892, and after 1895 conducted the symphony concerts of the Cincinnati Symphony Orchestra, with which he programmed both Flemish and American music. He also became the dean of the college of music in this city. He is particularly remembered for his symphonic prologue to Heinrich Heine's tragedy William Ratcliffe and is known for conducting several American premieres of European works. Van der Stucken was elected an honorary member of the Eta chapter of Phi Mu Alpha Sinfonia fraternity in 1906. From 1908 until 1917 he lived in Hanover; he died in Hamburg, Germany at the age of 70.

As a composer, Van der Stucken was very fond of the Germanic school and especially Wagner. He wrote orchestral works, a lyrical drama, piano works, choir music, and songs. He often used texts of German writers such as Heinrich Heine, Johann Wolfgang von Goethe and Friedrich Rückert. Some of his songs were translated by Helen Tretbar.
