= Maud Thompson =

American educator and suffragist (1870–1962)

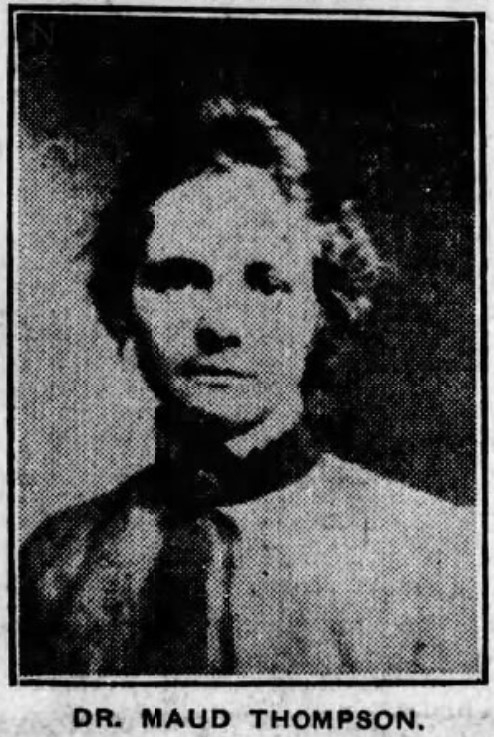
- Born: 1870; Cincinnati, Ohio
- Died: 1962 (aged 91–92)
- Education: Wellesley College, Yale University
- Occupations: Educator, Suffragist
- Spouse: William Bohn (m. 1909)

Dr. Maud Thompson (November 17, 1870 – September 26, 1962) was a women's rights activist, suffragist, and teacher. Thompson held leadership positions in women's rights and suffragist associations in Michigan and New Jersey. She lectured on women's right issues at activist gatherings, including at the Paterson Silk Strike in Paterson, New Jersey. Thompson also taught classics at private schools in Connecticut, New Jersey, and New Hampshire during a 40-year career in education.

== Early life and education ==
Thompson was born to Charles L. Thompson and Mary Boyd Thompson in Cincinnati, Ohio on November 17, 1870. She was the sister of Vance Thompson. She received her bachelor's degree from Wellesley College in Wellesley, Massachusetts in 1901 and then completed her master's degree at the school in 1902. During her studies at Wellesley, Thompson helped Gail Laughlin establish the Agora, a political society. While she was a student, she testified in support of women's suffrage in front of the Massachusetts Legisature.

Thompson also earned a Durant honor scholarship. She completed her Ph.D. in classics from Yale University in New Haven, Connecticut in 1906. Thompson's dissertation studied the property rights of women in Ancient Greece.

== Teaching career ==
Following graduation from her master's studies at Wellesley College, Thompson began her teaching career at the college level. She taught Greek and Latin at Irving Female College in Mechanicsburg, Pennsylvania for two years. After moving to Michigan, she taught at the Detroit Seminary in Detroit, Michigan from 1906-1908.

In 1917, Thompson began teaching at college preparatory schools. She first taught at the School of Organic Education in Fairhope, Alabama founded by educational reformer Marietta Johnson (now the Marietta Johnson School of Organic Education) for one year. Thompson then taught at the Beard School (now Morristown-Beard School) in Orange, New Jersey from 1918 to 1926. She served as head of the Latin Department at the school. Following her move to Connecticut, Thompson taught at the Edgewood School in Greenwich, Connecticut for the next 18 years. (The property now serves as the home of Eagle Hill School.) She also served as the academic director of the high school. Thompson finished her teaching career by teaching at High Mowing School in Wilton, New Hampshire for 12 years (1942-1956).

== Activism ==
While in Detroit, Thompson joined the Socialist Party in 1906. In 1910, Thompson moved to New Jersey where she was active in both socialist and suffragist causes.

== Personal life and death ==
Thompson married William Bohn in 1909. They had one child, Rhoda Bohn.

Thompson died in Port Chester, New York after a brief illness on September 26, 1962.
