= Helen Tretbar =

American author

Helen Dellenbaugh Tretbar (May 16, 1835 – April 3, 1902) was an American author, librettist, and translator who edited The Etude magazine in the late 1880s and was fluent in French, German, and Italian.

== Early life and education ==
Tretbar was born in Buffalo, New York, to Frederick and Magdalena Dellenbaugh. She graduated from the Female Academy in Buffalo (today the Buffalo Seminary), and married Charles F. Tretbar (1832-1909), who worked for Steinway & Sons and also published at least 40 works, including many of his wife's translations.

== Career ==
Tretbar translated From the Tone World. A Series of Essays by Louis Ehlert from German to English; her translation was published in 1884 by her husband. In 1887, she began working for The Etude magazine, eventually becoming the managing editor. In 1889, William A. Pond & Co. published Twenty-one New Song Vocalises, with music by Paolo La Villa and original texts by Tretbar. A review in Frank Leslie's Sunday Magazine noted that. . . "Mrs Tretbar's words rise often to the dignity of real poems and not a few of the vocalises are worthy of being sung parlor songs." In 1891, Tretbar adapted the original German libretto (by Moritz West and Ludwig Held) of Carl Zeller's operetta Der Vogelhandler for performance in America. Renamed The Tyrolean, it was performed 100 times at the Casino Theatre in New York. In 1947, it was performed in London as The Bird Seller.

Tretbar translated the lyrics in songs by many composers: Franz Abt, Reinhold Becker, Franz Behr, Theodore Bradsky, Frederick Brandeis, Jean-Baptiste Faure, Richard Genee, Friedrich Gernsheim, Victor Harris, Victor Herbert, Gustav Holzel, Rafael Joseffy, Bruno Oscar Klein, Erik Meyer-Helmund, Giacomo Batista Manzotti, Jules Massenet, Emanuel Moor, George Balch Nevin, Jean Louis Nicodé, Ignacy Paderewski, Johann Peters, Walter Petzet, Joachim Raff, Franz Ries, Martin Roeder, Louis Victor Saar, Xaver Scharwenka, Sebastian Bensen Schlesinger, Armin Schotte, Frank Van der Stucken, Robert Volkmann, and Carl Zeller.
