= Erik Meyer-Helmund =

Erik Meyer-Helmund (13 April 1861 in St Petersburg – 4 April 1932 in Berlin) was a Berlin-based composer and singer. His song "Flirtation" was recorded by John McCormack, and his "Gute Nacht, mein holdes, süßes Mädchen" by Nicolai Gedda and Fritz Wunderlich. Helen Tretbar translated several of his lieder from German into English.

== Selected works ==
- “Die beiden Klingsberg” opera
- “Der Liebeskampf”, opera
- “Rubezahl”, ballet
- “Tischka”, one-act burlesque
