= Vance Thompson =

American poet

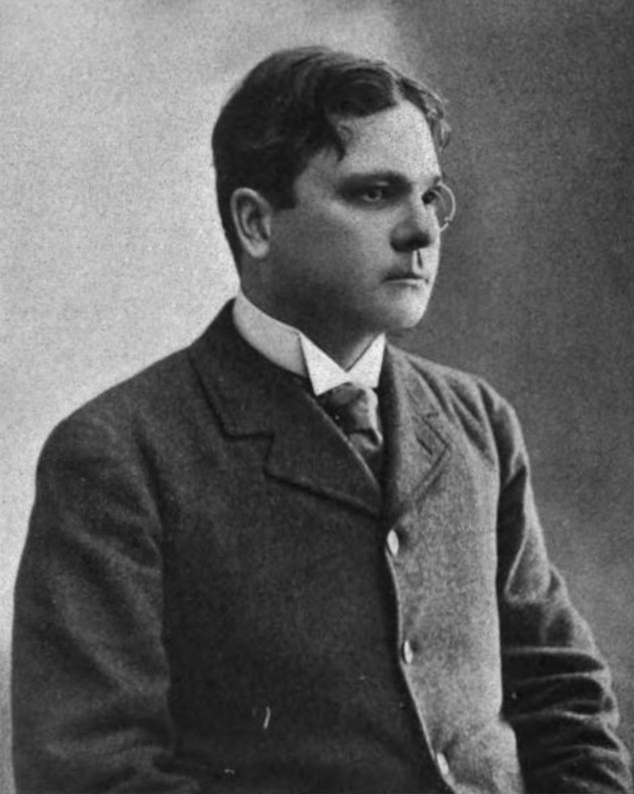
- In The Bookman, February 1900
- Born: April 17, 1863
- Died: June 5, 1925 (aged 62); Nice, France
- Education: Princeton University
- Occupations: Literary critic, writer
- Spouse: Lillian Spencer (m. 1890)

Vance Thompson (April 17, 1863 - June 5, 1925) was an American literary critic, novelist, poet and low-carbohydrate diet writer.

== Biography ==
The son of a Pittsburgh pastor and brother of Maud Thompson, he was educated at Princeton University and graduated in 1883. He later studied in Germany, and worked as a dramatic critic in New York City from 1890 to 1897. In 1890, he was married to stage actress and novelist Lillian Spencer. Like fellow-aesthete and good friend James Huneker, he helped bring fin-de-siècle French authors to the attention of the American public. He also wrote a study on the ego entitled the Ego Book: a Book of Selfish Ideals (1914). A study of French authors with ties to the Symbolist movement was published in 1913, entitled French Portraits: Being Appreciations of the Writers of Young France. From 1895 to 1899, he co-edited the periodical M'lle New York with Huneker. Described as "a highly idiosyncratic blend of serious analyses and presentations of European Symbolist literature and thought with buffoonery and incessant anti-philistinism", it quickly became a manifesto for their cultural ideals.

He died in Nice, France on June 5, 1925.

== Dieting ==
Thompson authored several books on healthy living, such as 1914's Eat and Grow Thin and 1916's Drink and Be Sober.

His diet book Eat and Grow Thin was popular, by 1931 it was in its 112th printing. It advocates a low-carbohydrate diet and contains a list of "forbidden foods". Thompson believed that dairy, pork, ham, bacon, beans, bread, grains, cereals, flour, rice, potatoes, sugar, and all alcoholic drinks should be avoided. He recommended eating all kinds of meat (except pig), game, seafood, eggs, fruit and green vegetables. The book was criticized for misrepresenting nutritional science.

Physician B. B. Vincent Lyon criticized Eat and Grow Thin for promoting a fad diet. Lyon noted that the high-protein content of the diet is dangerous for obese patients or those with cardiovascular or renal insufficiencies. Physiologist Graham Lusk commented that the advice from the book "made so many of my friends so utterly miserable that I am sure that in the end it will counteract its own message."

== Publications ==
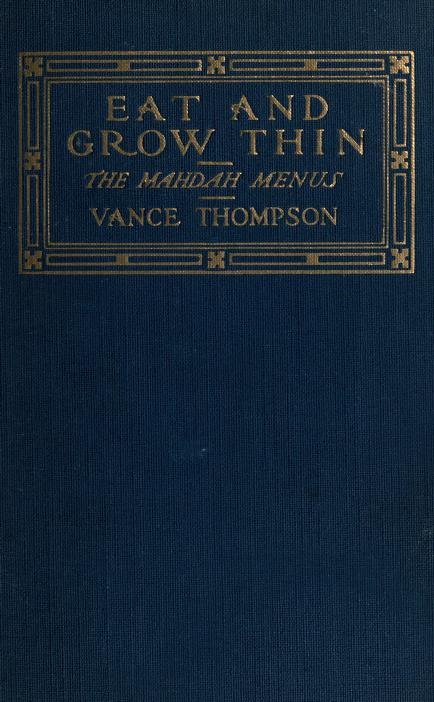
Eat and Grow Thin, 1914

- French Portraits: Being Appreciations of the Writers of Young France (1900)
- Spinners of Life (1904)
- Diplomatic Mysteries (1905)
- The Life of Ethelbert Nevin (1913)
- The Ego Book: A Book of Selfish Ideals (1914)
- The Night Watchman and Other Poems (1914)
- Eat and Grow Thin: The Mahdah Menus (1914)
- Drink and Be Sober (1915)
- Verse (1915)
- The Carnival of Destiny (1916)
- The Peace Girl (1916)
- Woman (1917)
- Live and Be Young (1920)
- The Pointed Tower (1923)
- The Green Ray (1924)
- The Scarlet Iris (1924)
- Mr. Guelpa (1925)
