= George Balch Nevin =

American composer

George Balch Nevin (March 15, 1859 – April 17, 1933) was an American composer and businessman. A member of the Nevin musical family, his cousins were the composers Ethelbert and Arthur Nevin; his son, Gordon Balch Nevin, also became a composer. His brother, David W. Nevin, was mayor of Easton, Pennsylvania from 1912 to 1920.

Nevin was born in Shippensburg, Pennsylvania, and spent most of his life in the town of Easton. His output consisted mainly of cantatas, and included such works as The Crown of Life and The Incarnation; he was also known for his setting of Sidney Lanier's poem "A Ballad of Trees and the Master", and wrote a number of hymns as well. Helen Tretbar translated at least one of his songs ("Ho! Fill Me a Flagon!") into German. For nearly thirty years, he ran a wholesale paper business in addition to composing.

Nevin was also a historian and lecturer, and would sometimes give lectures on subjects related to music history to local historical societies. Some of these have survived in manuscript form.

Nevin died in 1933.
