= Gordon Balch Nevin =

Gordon Balch Nevin (19 May 1892 – 15 November 1943) was an American composer and organist. A member of the Nevin musical family of Edgeworth, Pennsylvania., his cousins were the composers Ethelbert and Arthur Nevin, and he was the son of composer and businessman George Balch Nevin. The Balch Family is one of the Colonial and Revolutionary Families of Pennsylvania.

Nevin occupied the organist's chair at churches in Easton, Pennsylvania; Cleveland, Ohio; Johnstown, Pennsylvania; and he was organist of First Presbyterian Church in Greensburg, Pennsylvania, from 1918. Most of his compositions were for organ; he did, however, write a few secular songs, and among his published works are versions of several Stephen Foster songs. He was also a writer, publishing books on organ technique. He died in New Wilmington, Pennsylvania in 1943. His wife was the former Jessie Young of Johnstown, PA, a daughter of the Samuel E. and Elizabeth Rose Young Family and niece of US Congressman John Marshall Rose and grand-niece of W. Horace Rose, the 1st Mayor of Johnstown. Her Father, Samuel E. Young, was General Manager and Secretary of the Johnstown Passenger Railway Co.
