= Arthur Nevin =

American composer, conductor and teacher

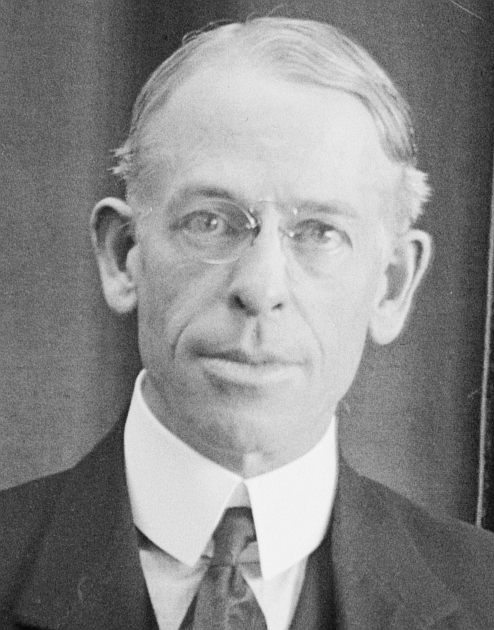
Arthur Nevin

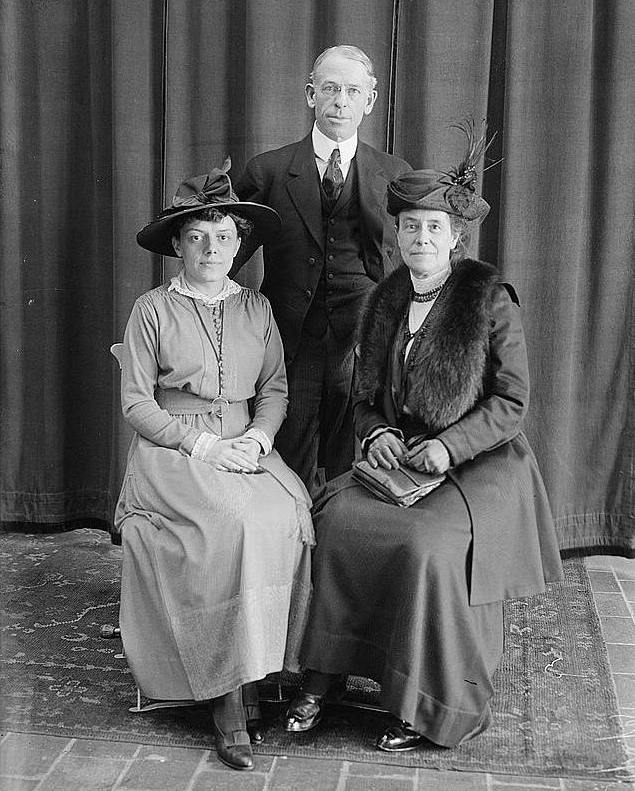
Frances Brundage, Marian MacDowell, and Arthur Nevin in 1917

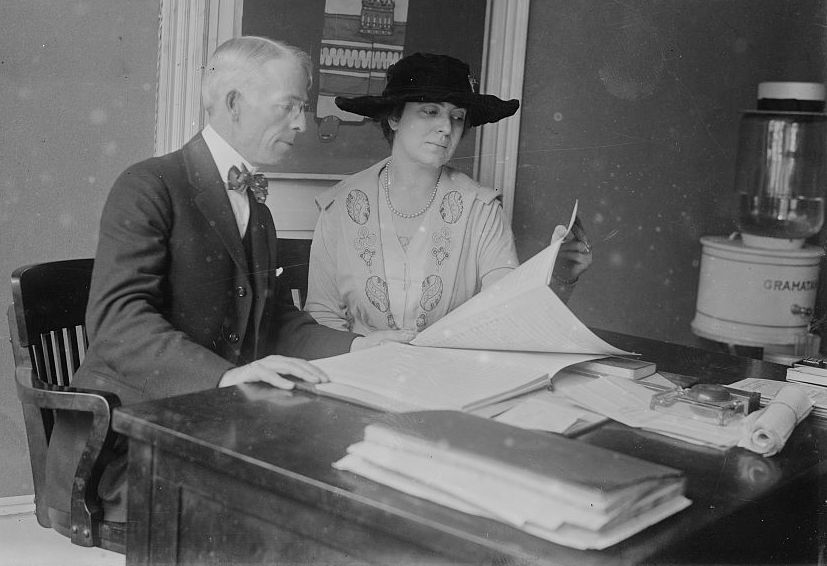
Nevin and Frances Peralta in 1917

Arthur Finley Nevin (April 27, 1871 – July 10, 1943) was an American composer, conductor, teacher and musicologist. Along with Charles Wakefield Cadman, Blair Fairchild, Charles Sanford Skilton, and Arthur Farwell, among others, he was one of the leading Indianist composers of the early twentieth century.

== Biography ==
Born in Edgeworth, Pennsylvania, Nevin was the younger brother of composer Ethelbert Nevin, and a cousin of George Balch Nevin and his son, Gordon, both of whom were also composers. He received his first musical instruction from his father before enrolling in the New England Conservatory in 1889, studying piano with Otto Bendix and music theory with Percy Goetschius. Completing his work there, in 1893 he traveled to Europe, there receiving instruction in piano from Karl Klindworth and Ernst Jedliczka, and studying composition with Otis Boise and Engelbert Humperdinck. In 1897 Nevin returned to the United States, and spent time teaching and conducting as well as writing music; some of his early pieces were published under the pseudonym "Arthur Dale". In 1903 and 1904, he spent the summers living with the Blackfeet tribe in Montana, using the opportunity to study their music and folklore. He soon became recognized as an expert on Indian culture, and his interest in the Blackfeet led to the composition of an opera, Poia, on the subject of their Scarface legend.

Between 1911 and 1914, Nevin worked in Virginia, also spending time in New Hampshire conducting at the MacDowell Colony. At the start of World War I, he took a teaching post at the University of Kansas, but gave it up when the United States entered the war in order to direct the army band and choirs at Camp Grant in Illinois. Post-war, he moved to New York after spending time in Tennessee; he suffered from poor health in the last two decades of his life. During this time he also traveled to Paris. He was elected an honorary member of the Alpha chapter of Phi Mu Alpha Sinfonia fraternity, the national fraternity for men in music, at the New England Conservatory c. 1916-1917. Nevin died in Sewickley, Pennsylvania, in 1943. He was married to the novelist Reita Lambert and had two children, Arthur Jr. and Martha Jane.

His great-grandchildren are Frances and Mark Quinlan of the band Hop Along.

== Music ==
Nevin is best known for his three-act opera Poia, based on the Blackfeet legend describing the origin of the Sun Dance. The opera was commissioned in 1903 by Walter McClintock. In June of that year, Nevin and McClintock traveled to the Blackfeet Indian Reservation where Nevin listened to "hundreds of songs, dirges, and ceremonial hymns" and transcribed the musical notes of the ones that most interested him. He was most inspired by the song sung by the people as they raised the center pole of the Blackfeet Medicine Lodge. On his last day on the reservation, Nevin heard the story of Scarface, a poor man with a disfiguring scar across his cheek. According to the legend, Scarface goes in search of the Sun after being rejected by the woman he loves. He eventually makes it to the lodge of the Sun, who is impressed by his bravery and heals his scar. After returning home to Pittsburgh, Nevin used the Scarface legend as inspiration to compose Poia on a libretto provided by Randolph Hartley. Poia was first heard in concert in Pittsburgh in 1907, and received good reviews. That same year, Theodore Roosevelt invited Nevin to the White House to give an illustrated talk on his work, but further interest from the American musical establishment was not forthcoming. Instead, Poia was given its highly controversial stage premiere on April 23, 1910, at the Royal Opera House in Berlin, in a German translation crafted in part by the composer's former teacher, Humperdinck. From there it fell into obscurity; it was only given again in the United States by the Great Falls Symphony Orchestra in 2005.

Nevin composed numerous other works besides Poia. A one-act opera, initially titled Twilight, was said to have been accepted for performance at the Metropolitan Opera, but never saw the stage there. It was given as A Daughter of the Forest in Chicago in 1918. Nevin's other output includes a number of other dramatic works, some pieces for chorus, and some chamber music, as well as four works for orchestra.

== Recordings ==
Little of Nevin's music has been committed to disc. Donna Amato recorded his Toccatella and piano suite From Edgeworth Hills (1903) for Altarus Records.
