= 1805 in the United Kingdom =

Events from the year 1805 in the United Kingdom. This is the year of the Battle of Trafalgar.

== Incumbents ==
- Monarch – George III
- Prime Minister – William Pitt the Younger (Tory)
- Foreign Secretary – Dudley Ryder, 1st Earl of Harrowby (until 11 January) Henry Phipps, 1st Earl of Mulgrave (from 11 January)
- Home Secretary – Lord Liverpool
- Secretary of War – Lord Camden (until 10 July) Lord Castlereagh (from 10 July)

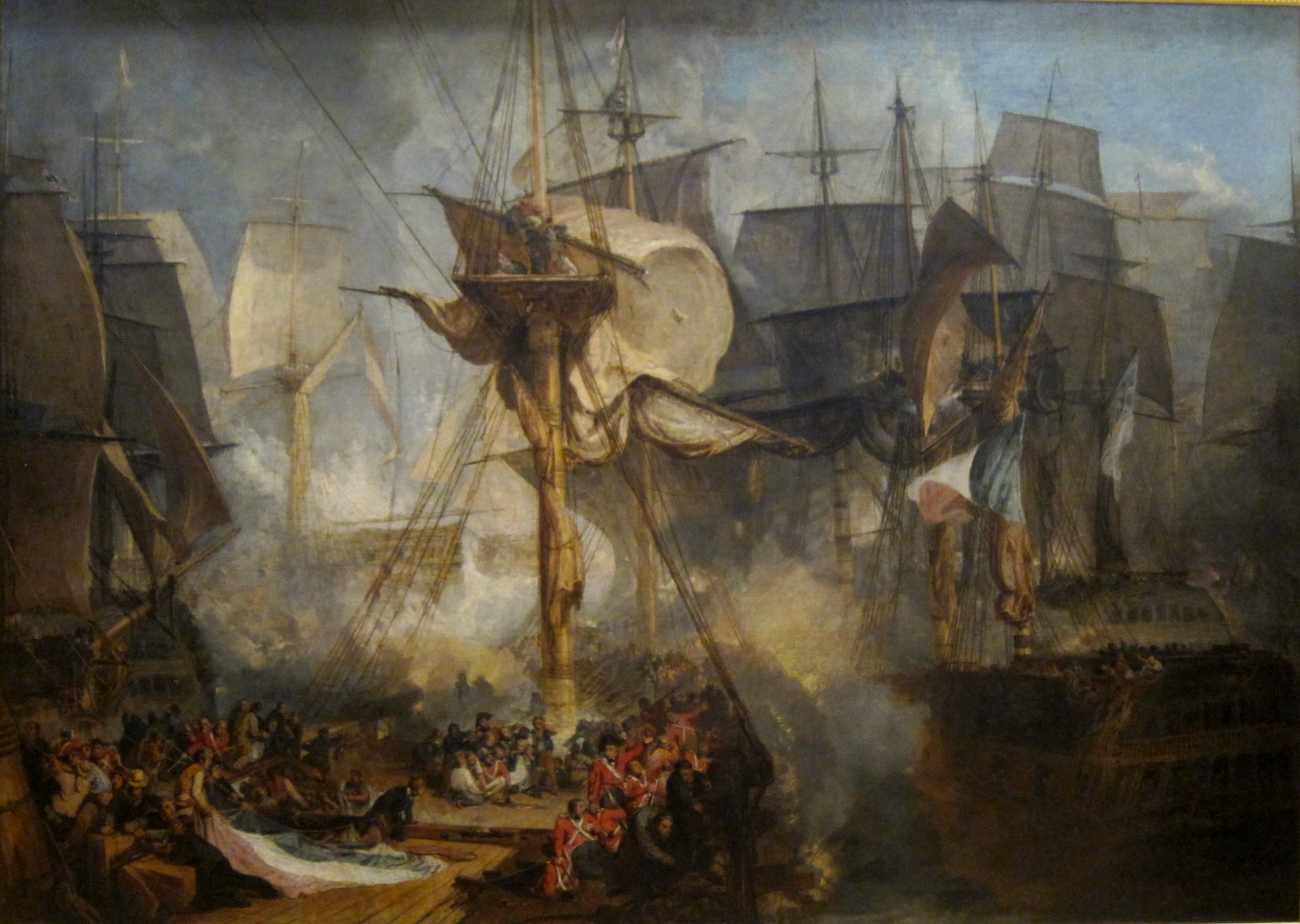
The Battle of Trafalgar by J. M. W. Turner, 1808

== Events ==
- 20 January – London Docks open.
- 5 February – East Indiaman Earl of Abergavenny is wrecked in Weymouth Bay with the loss of 263 lives.
- 21 February – Charles Manners-Sutton confirmed as Archbishop of Canterbury.
- 18 April – Ordnance Survey begins systematic publication of its General Survey of England and Wales ("Old Series") maps to a scale of one inch to the mile (1:63,360) with those for Essex.
- 4 June – The first Trooping the Colour ceremony at the Horse Guards Parade in London.
- 3 August – The annual cricket match between Eton College and Harrow School is played for the first time.
- 21 October
  - Napoleonic Wars: Battle of Trafalgar – British naval fleet led by Admiral Horatio Nelson defeats a combined French and Spanish fleet off the coast of Spain. Admiral Nelson is fatally shot.
  - An underground explosion at Hebburn colliery on Tyneside kills 35.
- 23 October – Troopship Aeneas is wrecked off Newfoundland with the loss of 340 lives.
- 6 November – News of the victory at Trafalgar and Nelson's death reaches London.
- 26 November – The Ellesmere Canal's Pontcysyllte Aqueduct is opened in Wales, the tallest and longest in Britain.

=== Ongoing ===
- Anglo-Spanish War, 1796–1808
- Napoleonic Wars, 1803–1815

== Publications ==
- John Dalton's paper "On the Absorption of Gases by Water and Other Liquids". Memoirs of the Literary and Philosophical Society of Manchester, 2nd series 1: pp. 271–87, including the first published list of standard atomic weights.
- Walter Scott's narrative poem The Lay of the Last Minstrel.
- First printed version of the nursery rhyme "Little Miss Muffet" in Songs for the Nursery.
- First printed version of the nursery rhyme "Old Mother Hubbard" in The Comic Adventures of Old Mother Hubbard and her Dog.
- First printed version of the folk song "Bobby Shafto's Gone to Sea" in its modern (Tyneside) version.
- First printed version of the nonconformist hymn tune "Cranbrook", later used for the folk song "On Ilkla Moor Baht 'at".

== Births ==
- 27 January – Samuel Palmer, landscape watercolourist (died 1881)
- 4 February – W. Harrison Ainsworth, historical novelist (died 1882)
- 8 March – Rayner Stephens, Scottish-born radical reformer and Methodist minister (died 1879)
- 20 March – Thomas Cooper, Chartist, poet and religious lecturer (died 1892)
- 5 July
  - Jérôme Napoléon Bonaparte, agriculturalist, nephew of Napoleon I (died 1870 in the United States)
  - Robert FitzRoy, admiral and meteorologist (suicide 1865)
- 9 August – Joseph Locke, railway civil engineer (died 1860)
- 29 August – Frederick Denison Maurice, theologian (died 1872)
- 7 November – Thomas Brassey, railway contractor (died 1870)
- 20 December – Thomas Graham, Scottish-born chemist (died 1869)
- 22 December – John O. Westwood, entomologist (died 1893)

== Deaths ==
- 2 January – Alexander Wedderburn, 1st Earl of Rosslyn, Lord Chancellor (born 1733)
- 3 January – Charles Towneley, antiquary (born 1737)
- 30 January – John Robison, physicist (born 1739)
- 18 January – John Moore, Archbishop of Canterbury (born 1730)
- 2 February – Thomas Banks, sculptor (born 1735)
- 25 February
  - William Buchan, doctor (born 1729)
  - Thomas Pownall, colonial statesman (born 1722)
- 7 May – William Petty, 2nd Earl of Shelburne, Prime Minister (born 1737)
- 25 May – William Paley, philosopher (born 1743)
- 3 August – Christopher Anstey, writer (born 1724)
- 28 August – Alexander Carlyle, church leader (born 1722)
- 5 October – Charles Cornwallis, 1st Marquess Cornwallis, general (born 1738)
- 21 October – Horatio Nelson, admiral (mortally wounded in battle) (born 1758)
