= While shepherds watched their flocks =

Christmas carol

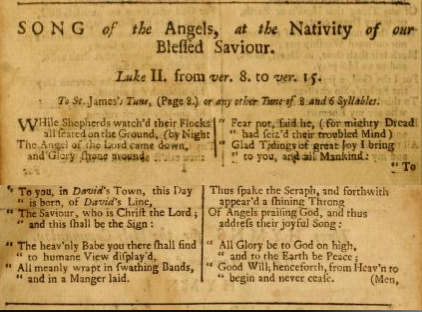
- "Song of the Angels at the Nativity of our Blessed Saviour" from A New version of the Psalms of David
- Genre: Hymn
- Written: 1700
- Text: Nahum Tate
- Based on: Luke 2:8
- Meter: 8.6.8.6
- Melody: "Winchester Old" by George Kirbye, "Christmas" by George Frideric Handel, arranged by Lowell Mason

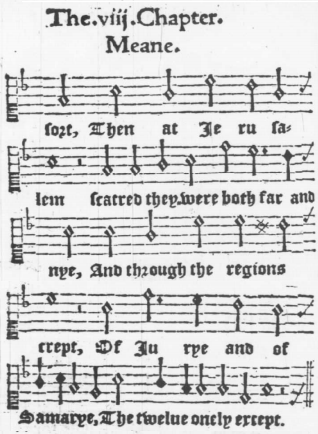
The "meane" of chapter VIII in Christopher Tye's Actes of the Apostles of 1553. The latter half was adapted and used as the tune of "Winchester Old".

"While shepherds watched their flocks" is a traditional Christmas carol describing the Annunciation to the Shepherds, with words attributed to Irish hymnist, lyricist and England's poet laureate Nahum Tate. It is listed as number 936 in the Roud Folk Song Index.

The exact date of Tate's composition is not known, but the words appeared in Tate and Nicholas Brady's 1700 supplement to their New Version of the Psalms of David of 1696. It was the only Christmas hymn authorised to be sung by the Anglican Church; before 1700 only the Psalms of David were permitted to be sung. It is written in common metre and based on the Gospel of Luke 2:8–14.

It is the only one of the sixteen works in the 1700 supplement to still be sung today. It was published by Davies Gilbert (London, 1822), and William B. Sandys (London, 1833). The carol is sung to a wide variety of tunes, the two most common ones being Winchester Old in the United Kingdom and a variation on a Handel aria arranged by Lowell Mason in the United States.

== Tunes ==
Professor Jeremy Dibble of Durham University has noted that "While shepherds watched" was "the only Christmas hymn to be approved by the Church of England in the 18th century and this allowed it to be disseminated across the country with the Book of Common Prayer." This was because most carols, which had roots in folk music, were considered too secular and thus not used in church services until the end of the 18th century. As a result of its approved status, many tunes have been associated with this carol. The editors of the English Hymnal note that "it is impossible to print all the tunes which are traditionally sung to this hymn".

=== Winchester Old ===
Winchester Old
(1.5 Mb)

In the United Kingdom and Commonwealth countries, the standard hymn tune of "While shepherds watched" is "Winchester Old" (initially simply "Winchester"), originally published in Este's psalter The Whole Book of Psalmes from 1592. This tune was, in turn, arranged from chapter VIII of Cambridgeshire composer Christopher Tye's setting of the Acts of the Apostles in 1553.

George Kirbye, an East Anglian madrigalist about whom little is known, was employed by Este to arrange tunes featured in his The Whole Book of Psalmes and it is his arrangement of Tye's work that appears in the psalter to accompany Psalm 84 "How Lovely is Thy Dwelling Place" with the melody in the tenor. The tune and hymn text were probably first published together in an arrangement by William Henry Monk for Hymns Ancient and Modern in 1861.

=== Other versions ===
Jackson's Tune
(1.5 Mb)

David Weyman's adaptation of "Christmas", taken from an aria in the 1728 opera Siroe by George Frideric Handel was arranged by Lowell Mason in 1821, and it is now this version which is most commonly used in the United States. The Hymnal Committee of the United Methodist Church, for example, selected "Christmas" for its current hymnal, published in 1989, after the previous 1966 edition had used "Winchester Old". The Presbyterian Hymnal (1990) and the more recent Glory to God hymnal published in 2013 by the Presbyterian Church (USA) include both the "Winchester Old" and "Christmas" versions, while the Episcopal Hymnal 1982 has "Winchester Old" and an alternate tune, "Hampton", composed by McNeil Robinson in 1985.

American composer Daniel Read published his tune "Sherburne" in 1785, a popular setting that appeared over seventy times in print before 1810 and is still commonly sung by Sacred Harp singers. It was set to music in 1812 in Harmonia Sacra.

The hymn tune "Cranbrook" was written in 1805 by Canterbury shoe-maker Thomas Clark and named after the local village of Cranbrook in Kent. It was originally set to the words 'Grace 'tis a charming sound' written by Philip Doddridge but is now better known in the UK as the tune of On Ilkla Moor Baht 'at. Another popular tune for the hymn from around that time is Old Foster.

It has been set to numerous other tunes, most commonly "Martyrdom", written by Hugh Wilson in 1800 but with an arrangement by Ralph E. Hudson from around 1885, and "Shackelford" by Frederick Henry Cheeswright from 1889. Robert Jackson, parish organist at All Saints‘ Church, Oldham, Lancashire, wrote a tune to "While shepherds watched their flocks by night" in 1903 for the Westwood Moravian Church there. Called "Jackson's Tune," it remains popular in Oldham. A note in The English Hymnal mentions "University" and "Crowle" as tunes to which is occasionally sung. In Cornwall and South Yorkshire, the carol is popularly sung to "Lyngham", a tune usually associated with "O for a Thousand Tongues to Sing". Another tune traditionally used for it in Cornwall is "Northrop". In the towns of villages in the Pennines of West Yorkshire such as Todmorden, "Shaw Lane" is used. "Sweet Chiming Bells" is an alternative folk version, repurposing the tune of a different carol, "O'er earthly plains". This tune is commonly sung in South Yorkshire and Derbyshire and also found in North East England. It uses the verses of the standard hymn alongside the refrain from "O'er earthly plains".

== Textual Variants ==
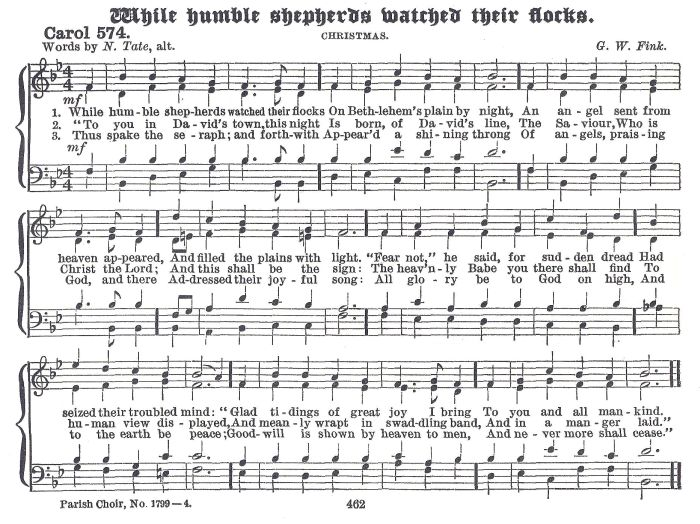
An arrangement from the 19th century with music by G. W. Fink. Here the title is given as "While Humble Shepherds Watched Their Flocks"

The title in the supplement was "Song of the Angels at the Nativity of our Blessed Saviour", but it has since become known chiefly by its incipit. In Tate's original it appeared as Whilst Shepherds Watched Their Flocks (i.e. 'whilst' not 'while'), but most modern hymn books print "While".

A 19th-century version by Gottfried W. Fink was While humble shepherds watched their flocks and other rewritten passages (see illustration). The Hymnal 1982 published in the United States also contained a number of other modernisations, including dropping "Hallelujah" as the final line.

1. While humble shepherds watched their flocks
On Bethlehem's plain by night,
An angel sent from heaven appeared,
And filled the plains with light.
“Fear not,” he said, for sudden dread
Had seized their troubled mind:
“Glad tidings of great joy I bring
To you and all mankind.

2. “To you in David's town, this night
Is born, of David's line,
The Saviour, Who is Christ the Lord;
And this shall be the sign:
The heav'nly Babe you there shall find
To human view displayed,
And meanly wrapt in swaddling band,
And in a mange laid.”

3. Thus spake the seraph; and forthwith
Appear'd a shining throng
Of Angels, praising God, and there
Addressed their joyful song;
All glory be to God on high,
And to the earth be peace;
Good will is shown by heaven to men,
And never more shall cease.

=== Schoolboy parody ===
In the UK, generations of schoolboys have traditionally sung parodies of Christmas songs like We Three Kings or Jingle Bells before the yearly Nativity Play. The lyrics varied depending on the region, but a typical version had references to washing socks and watching television. The parody song was later used to advertise Sunlight soap.

While Shepherds washed their socks by night
All watching ITV
The angel of the Lord came down
And switched to BBC

The Shepherds shouted "Switch it back"
But the angel tripped and fell
He snapped the TV aerial
And they shouted "Bloody hell"

While Shepherds washed their socks by night
All seated round the tub
A bar of Sunlight soap fell down
And they began to scrub

And when their socks were shining white
And sparkling like a gem
They put their socks back on again
And walked to Bethlehem

And when they got to Bethlehem
All looking nice and neat
The Christ child said "You've got nice socks
But next time wash your feet"

== See also ==
- List of Christmas carols
