= Josef Liebeskind =

German composer

Josef Franz Liebeskind (1866 – 1916) was a German composer born in Leipzig, Saxony on 22 April 1866 to Franz Ludwig and Henriette Josefine Liebeskind. He studied at the Leipzig Conservatory. He edited large numbers of works by Mozart, Dittersdorf, and Gluck. Daniel Gregory Mason described him as a "composer, writer, and collector of musicalia".

His known works include: Lobe den Herrn, motet for chorus, Op 1; String Quartet No. 1 in E minor, Op 2 (1888); Trio for piano, violin and cello in D minor, op 3 (1893); Symphony No. 1 in A minor, op 4 (1894); Zwei Fugen für die Orgel, Op 6 (1895); String Quartet No. 2 in C major, Op 7 (1896). After his death, Liebeskind's sons donated his library, which included early editions and unpublished manuscripts, to the Swiss National Library.
