= William Mason (composer) =

Composer

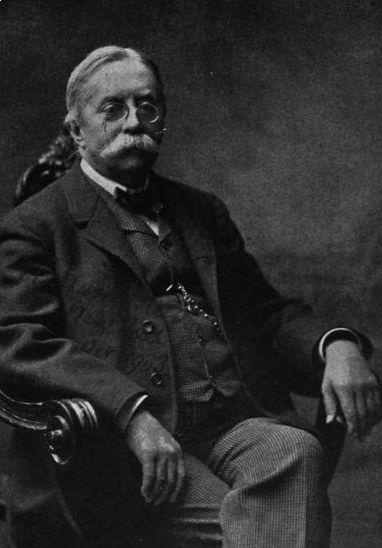
William Mason

William Mason (January 24, 1829 – July 14, 1908) was an American composer and pianist and a member of a musical family. His father was composer Lowell Mason, a leading figure in American church music, and his younger brother, Henry Mason, was a co-founder of the piano manufacturers Mason & Hamlin.

== Career ==
Mason was born in Boston. After a successful debut at the Boston Academy of Music, he went to Europe in 1849; there he was the first American piano student of Franz Liszt and Ignaz Moscheles. He became the leader of a chamber ensemble based in New York that introduced many works of Robert Schumann and other famous Europeans to Americans during the Civil War era and beyond, at a time when classical music still had little specifically American identity.

Mason published numerous pedagogical works for the piano student, but is remembered above all for his Chopinesque compositions for piano. The American composer and pianist Edward MacDowell (1860-1908) dedicated his second piano sonata, Op. 50 Sonata Eroica (1895), to William Mason. He died in New York City, aged 79.

His notable students included pianist and conductor William Rogers Chapman, and organist, conductor and composer Edward Morris Bowman.
