= Cranbrook (hymn tune) =

Musical composition by Thomas Clark

"Cranbrook", also known as "Northampton", is a hymn tune composed in the 1790s or early 1800s by Thomas Clark (1775–1859), a cobbler from Canterbury, and is best known as the tune to the Yorkshire "national anthem" "On Ilkla Moor Baht 'at".

The tune was originally published in A Sett of Psalm & Hymn Tunes with some Select Pieces and an Anthem in 1805 as a setting for "Grace 'tis a charming sound" by Philip Doddridge, but soon became more widely known as a tune for "While shepherds watched their flocks" by Nahum Tate. The tune is in the metre of 86.88.666 but is commonly used with lyrics in common metre (86.86). In order to fit, the third line is sung twice and the fourth three times as in "Grace 'tis a charming sound", "O for a Thousand Tongues to Sing", "While Shepherds Watched Their Flocks" and "On Ilkla Moor baht 'at".

Thomas Clark was a regular visitor to Cranbrook, Kent, in the 1790s, and may have composed the tune there, possibly with the help of a local schoolmaster, John Francis.

Clark later became a choirmaster and composed many other tunes for churches and Sunday schools.

== Music ==
The following is a rendition of the tune, as heard from "While Shepherds Watched Their Flocks".
