= John Foster (composer) =

British composer and magistrate

John Foster (1752–1822) of High Green in the parish of Ecclesfield, West Riding of Yorkshire was a coroner and amateur musician. He composed two books of sacred music in a 19th-century classical style published between 1817 and 1822, Sacred Music and A 2d Collection of Sacred Music. Both books were published in York by Samuel Knapton (the father of the organist and composer Philip Knapton). They comprise 17 settings of metrical psalm and hymn texts (8 in the first book and 9 in the second), with orchestral and keyboard accompaniments, and are dedicated to Richard Lumley-Saunderson, 6th Earl of Scarbrough. There are copies of both books in the Sheffield Local Studies Library.

Foster is now best known as the composer of a tune known as Old Foster, to which the words While shepherds watched their flocks by night are sung in the South Yorkshire pub carolling tradition (for example, at the Fountain Inn at Ingbirchworth). A version of the tune is also sung at Castleton, Derbyshire, where it is known as Prince of Orange and used with the words Hark, the glad sound! the Saviour comes, by Philip Doddridge. The tune was originally published in A 2d Collection of Sacred Music as a setting of Psalm 47 in the metrical version by John Hopkins, Ye people all with one accord: the pub carol tradition is thought to originate from the ejection of 'west gallery' choirs and bands from parish churches in the mid-nineteenth century.

Foster is credited by Alfred Gatty, vicar of Ecclesfield from 1839 to 1903, with the suppression of dog- and cock-fighting in the local area.

Commercial recordings of two of Foster's works, with full orchestral accompaniments, have been made by the group 'Psalmody' conducted by Peter Holman. Their first CD While shepherds watched includes While shepherds watched their flocks by night sung to the 'Old Foster' or Ps. 47 tune, while their CD Haydn and his English Friends includes The God of Gods, the Lord, also taken from A 2d Collection of Sacred Music.
