= Daniel Gregory Mason =

American composer and music critic

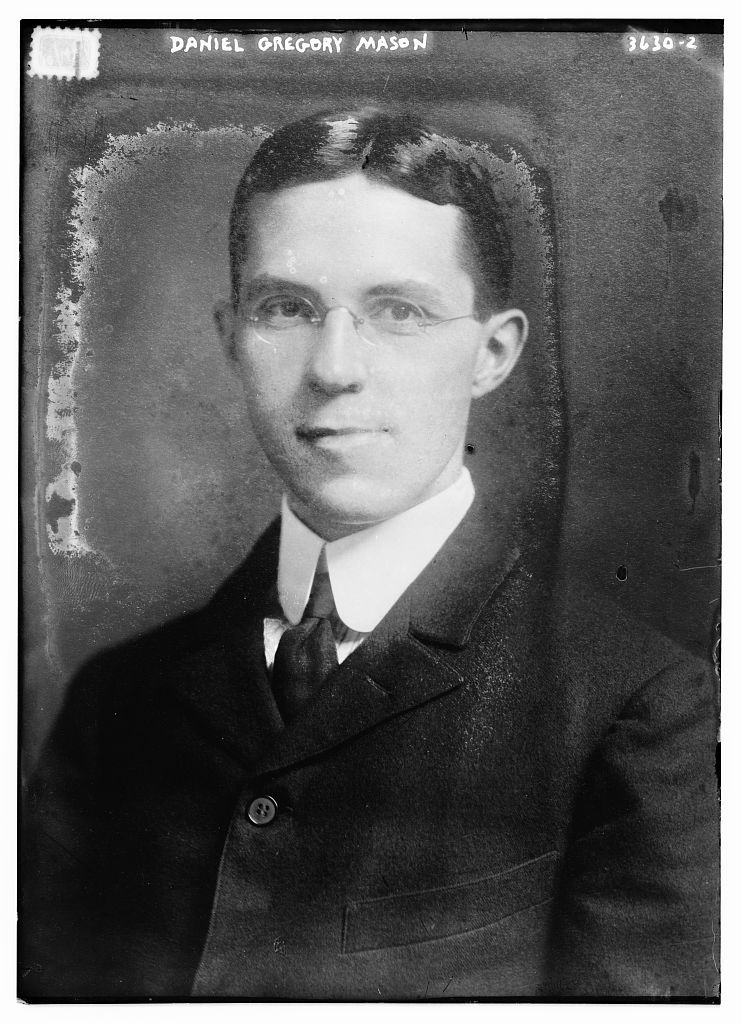
Daniel Gregory Mason circa 1915

Daniel Gregory Mason (November 20, 1873 – December 4, 1953) was an American composer and music critic.

== Biography ==
Mason was born in Brookline, Massachusetts. He came from a long line of notable American musicians, including his father Henry Mason, and his grandfather Lowell Mason. His cousin, John B. Mason, was a popular actor on the American and British stage. Daniel Mason studied under John Knowles Paine at Harvard University from 1891 to 1895, continuing his studies with George Chadwick and Percy Goetschius. He also studied with Arthur Whiting and later wrote a biographical journal article about him. In 1894 he published his Opus 1, a set of keyboard waltzes, but soon after began writing about music as his primary career. He became a lecturer at Columbia University in 1905, where he would remain until his retirement in 1942, successively being awarded the positions of assistant professor (1910), MacDowell professor (1929) and head of the music department (1929-1940). He was elected a member of Phi Mu Alpha Sinfonia fraternity, the national fraternity for men in music, in 1914 by the Fraternity's Alpha chapter at the New England Conservatory in Boston.

After 1907, Mason began devoting significant time to composition, studying with Vincent D'Indy in Paris in 1913, garnering numerous honorary doctorates and winning prizes from the Society for the Publication of American Music and the Juilliard Foundation.

He died in Greenwich, Connecticut.

== Style ==
Mason's compositional idiom was thoroughly romantic. He deeply admired and respected the Austro-Germanic canon of the nineteenth century, especially Brahms; despite studying under D'Indy, he disliked impressionism and utterly disregarded the modernist musical movements of the 20th century. Mason sought to increase respect for American music, sometimes incorporating indigenous and popular motifs (such as popular songs or Negro spirituals) into his scores or evoking them through suggestive titles, though he was not a thorough-going nationalist. He was a fastidious composer who repeatedly revised his scores (the manuscripts of which are now held at Columbia).

=== List of compositions ===
Note:This list is incomplete.

==== Orchestral ====
- Symphony no.1 in C minor, Op. 11 (1913–14)
- Prelude and Fugue, Op. 12, pf, orch (1914)
- Chanticleer, festival ov. (1926)
- Symphony no.2, in A major, Op. 30 (1928–9)
- Suite after English Folksongs, Op. 32 (1933–4)
- Symphony no.3 in B-flat major 'A Lincoln Symphony’, Op. 35 (1935–6)
- Prelude and Fugue, c, Op. 37, str (1939)
- also wrote some incidental music, transcriptions

==== Vocal ====
- 4 Songs (M. Lord), Op. 4, 1v, pf (1906)
- 6 Love Songs (M.L. Mason), Op. 15, 1v, pf, 1914–15, arr. S, orch (1935)
- Russians (W. Bynner), song cycle, Op. 18, 1v, pf, 1915–17, arr. Bar, orch (1915–17)
- Songs of the Countryside (A.E. Housman), Op. 23, chorus, orch (1923)
- 5 Songs of Love and Life, Op. 36, 1v, pf, (1895–1922)
- 3 (Nautical) Songs (W. Irwin), Op. 38, 1v, pf (1941)
- 2 Songs, Op. 41, Bar, pf (1946–7)
- Soldiers, song cycle, Op. 42, Bar, pf (1948–9)
- Also wrote ~50 songs without opus numbers.
- Unaccompanied choral pieces, Opp. 25, 29

==== Chamber works ====
- Sonata, Op. 5, vn, pf (1907–8)
- Piano Quartet, Op. 7 (1909–11)
- Pastorale, Op. 8, vn, cl/va, pf (1909–12)
- 3 Pieces, Op. 13, fl, hp, str qt (1911–12)
- Sonata, Op. 14, cl/vn, pf (1912–15)
- Intermezzo, Op. 17, str qt (1916)
- String Quartet on Negro Themes, Op. 19 (1918–19)
- Variations on a Theme of John Powell, str qt (1924–5)
- Divertimento, Op. 26b, wind quintet (1926)
- Fanny Blair, folksong fantasy, Op. 28, str qt, (1927)
- Serenade, Op. 31, str qt (1931)
- Sentimental Sketches, pf trio (Op. 34)
- Variations on a Quiet Theme, Op. 40, str qt (1939)

==== Keyboard works ====
- Birthday Waltzes, Op. 1, pf (1894)
- Variations on Yankee Doodle, Op. 6, pf (c1911)
- Passacaglia and Fugue, Op. 10, org (1912)
- 2 Choral Preludes on Lowell Mason’s Tunes, Op. 39, organ (1941), organ work written for Lowell Mason's sesquicentennial celebrations (one of which was Dort).
- other piano pieces, Opp. 2, 3, 9, 16, 21, 33

== Writings ==
Mason was once "the most widely read author in America of books about music and composers." Mason wrote or co-wrote eighteen books on music, including an autobiography and a number of music appreciation works written for a general audience. His analyses of the chamber music of Brahms and Beethoven have been recognized as insightful. In his more polemical works, he attacked modern music, urged American composers to stop imitating Continental models and find an individual style, and criticized European conductors in America (such as Arturo Toscanini) for rarely including American works in their programs.

Retrospective analysts of Mason's career have observed that his conservative aesthetic opinions were intertwined with "troubling" rhetoric about national, racial, and religious identity. Mason insisted that America's culture was "Anglo-Saxon" at its core and must not be corrupted by foreign, particularly Jewish and African, influences, such as jazz and ragtime. Although he co-signed a 1921 open letter condemning "a campaign of anti-Semitism in this country" and affirming "the loyalty and patriotism of our fellow citizens of the Jewish faith," he had written only two months earlier:

The Oriental, especially the Jewish, infection in our music, seemingly less widespread than the German was or the French is, may prove even more virulent... The insidiousness of the Jewish menace to our artistic integrity is due partly to the speciousness of Hebrew art, its brilliance, its violently juxtaposed extremes of passion, its poignant eroticism and pessimism, and partly to the fact that the strain in us which might make head against it, the deepest, most fundamental strain perhaps in our mixed nature, is diluted and confused by a hundred other tendencies. The Anglo-Saxon group of qualities, the Anglo-Saxon point of view... are nevertheless the vital nucleus of the American temper. And the Jewish domination of our music, even more than the Teutonic and the Gallic, threatens to submerge and stultify them at every point.

By 1931, Mason was arguing that the national taste might be permanently debased by the "intoxication of alien art," generating enough controversy that he wrote to the New York Times in 1933 that he had been "misinterpreted" as "friendly to jingoism and Hitlerian nationalism." Mason and other "Yankee" composers such as Charles Ives saw their duty as the preservation and redemption of the American spirit, and saw their enemy in composers such as George Gershwin, Aaron Copland, Ernest Bloch (all of Jewish heritage), Igor Stravinsky, and jazz music generally.

=== List of books ===
- From Grieg to Brahms (New York, 1902, 2/1927/R)
- Beethoven and his Forerunners (New York, 1904, 2/1930)
- The Romantic Composers (New York, 1906)
- with T.W. Surette : The Appreciation of Music (New York, 1907)
- The Orchestral Instruments (New York, 1908)
- A Child's Guide to Music (New York, 1909)
- A Neglected Sense in Piano Playing (New York, 1912)
- The Dance (New York, 1916)
- with M.L. Mason : Great Modern Composers (New York, 1916, 2/1968)
- Contemporary Composers (New York, 1918)
- Short Studies of Great Masterpieces (New York, 1918)
- Music as a Humanity (New York, 1920)
- From Song to Symphony (New York, 1924)
- Artistic Ideals (New York, 1925)
- The Chamber Music of Brahms (New York, 1928/R)
- The Dilemma of American Music and Other Essays (New York, 1928)
- Tune in, America (New York, 1928/R)
- Music in my Time, and Other Reminiscences (New York, 1938)
- The Quartets of Beethoven (New York, 1947)

== Sources ==
- Boris Schwartz and N.E. Tawa, "Daniel Gregory Mason (ii). The New Grove Dictionary of Music and Musicians online.
