= Sheffield Archives =

- Location: 52 Shoreham Street; Sheffield; S1 4SP, England
- Type: Public archive
- Scope: To store archive material relating to the Sheffield and South Yorkshire area and make it available for members of the public for research.
- Branch of: Sheffield City Council Libraries Archives and Information

Collection
- Items collected: Records of schools, hospitals, courts, businesses, charities, trades unions and political parties, local authorities and other public and private sector bodies from the 12th to 21st centuries.

Access and use
- Access requirements: Free access to most items

Other information
- Website: www.sheffield.gov.uk/archives

Sheffield City Archives (located in Sheffield, South Yorkshire, England) collects, preserves and lists records (or archives) relating to Sheffield and South Yorkshire and makes them available for reference and research.

Sheffield City Archives is a joint service with Sheffield Local Studies Library. They are part of the Sheffield Libraries Archives and Information Service delivered by Sheffield City Council

== History of archive collecting in Sheffield ==
=== Up to 1939 ===
Sheffield's Central Library was officially opened in 1934. In planning it Mr J. P. Lamb, who was then City Librarian, gave considerable thought to the accommodation and expansion of the local history and 'special' collections (as they were then called). A large reading room was provided to accommodate readers and house the local collection of printed material; there were storage facilities for maps and special collections in an adjoining room and two small strongrooms in the basement, providing about 700 feet of shelving for manuscripts.

During the previous twenty-five years the beginnings of a local collection of archives had been brought together, particularly through the assistance of a Sheffield solicitor, T. Walter Hall, himself a competent antiquary and from 1910 to 1926 a co-opted member of the Libraries Committee. Through his good offices the Library in 1912 acquired the Jackson collection, consisting of many original documents and a large amount of genealogical material. This was followed by two fine solicitors' accumulations (Wheat and Tibbitts), subsequently added to, and a number of smaller groups. Finally in 1933, in anticipation of the opening of the new building, the Fairbank collection of several thousand draft maps and plans, accumulated by a local family of surveyors between c. 1740 and 1840, was given to the Library. About the same time the executors of Edward Carpenter, the socialist writer who had lived at Holmesfield near Sheffield, presented the Carpenter collection comprising Carpenter's library, editions of his works, and manuscript material. In 1926 the Library had been recognised by the Master of the Rolls as a repository for manorial records.

The nearest institutions collecting documents and archives at this time were at Leeds (the Yorkshire Archaeological Society and Leeds Public Libraries), Manchester (John Rylands Library) and Derby (Derby Public Library). Though the Yorkshire Archaeological Society aimed at covering the whole of Yorkshire, it was not very active in the southern part of the West Riding and the other three scarcely impinged on the Sheffield region. From the first Sheffield therefore aimed to cover an area roughly within thirty miles radius of the Town Hall, including North Derbyshire and South Yorkshire.

=== 1939 – 1945 ===
The outbreak of hostilities in 1939 and the heavy air-raids on Sheffield in December 1940 affected the development of the archive collections in several unfortunate ways. Staff shortages soon meant that only routine attention could be given them, and in December 1941 they were removed for safety to a comparatively rural branch library where premises had been specially strengthened to protect them. More disastrous, the Sheffield Union offices in West Bar, where the Guardians' records still remained, together with the surviving records of the old overseers of the poor, were completely destroyed by enemy action. At the same time business firms were turning out their old records for salvage; the Library does not appear to have taken any steps to save such records from destruction and much was undoubtedly lost at this period.

The war years were not, however, entirely devoid of interest, for 1942 saw the purchase of part of the antiquarian collection of Bacon-Frank of Campsall (Talbot correspondence), the gift of family records from Beauchief Hall and silver-plating records and catalogues of the firm of Thomas Bradbury & Sons.

=== 1945 – 1960 ===
After the war the collections were brought back to the Central Library and the reading room, which had been closed for the duration, was re-opened in November 1947. A turning point came about a year later on 31 October 1948 when, with the City Librarian's active support, a meeting of the National Register of Archives was held at the Central Library with the late Lord Scarbrough in the chair; at the meeting it was decided to set up a South Yorkshire committee of the National Register.

Colonel G. E. G. Malet, the Registrar of the National Register, was faced with a particular South Yorkshire problem at this time. The great Fitzwilliam mansion of Wentworth Woodhouse was about to be let to the West Riding as a college. There was an immediate need to find a repository willing to receive the whole of the family archives (except the muniments of title) many of which lay stacked in the corridors there. The City Librarian and the Libraries committee agreed to accept them into custody on loan deposit and on 26 and 27 January 1949 three large furniture vans transported the archives to Sheffield. It is difficult to remember how they were housed until two new strong rooms with 1800 feet of shelving were made ready for use early the following year. During the summer of 1949 a document repairer was appointed and given a period of training at the Public Record Office.

Following the announcement in the press of the deposit of the Fitzwilliam archives, scholars from both sides of the Atlantic began to make their way to the Library, initially to study the Rockingham and Burke papers. Professor T. W. Copeland arrived in May 1949 and five Americans were working on the papers that summer. Two years later Chicago University Press undertook to sponsor a new and full edition of Edmund Burke's correspondence, with Professor Copeland as general editor. For the next 18 years the 'Burke factory' was working in part of the Sheffield Local History and Archives Department on this project.

The ten years following 1949 saw the deposit of several large family and estate archives, including the Duke of Norfolk's Sheffield and Worksop estate records, as well as other types of records. The full-time appointment of an archivist as the National Register of Archives, South Yorkshire committee's representative (working from the Central Library) for about eighteen months during 1953–4 was a great asset at this time. Early in 1956, as part of the City Libraries' centenary celebrations, a Guide to the Manuscript Collections was published.

=== 1960 – 1974 ===
By 1960 most large family collections were already in custody and in the following years a wider range of records was received from varied sources. Several smaller family collections came from London solicitors (through the British Records Association or privately). In 1962 came the first official deposit of parish records of the diocese of Sheffield and the same year the first deposit of Methodist chapel and circuit records. In 1964 the Library was recognised by the Bishop as the diocesan repository for parish records.

Documents from Sheffield solicitors' offices have been prominent from the start; in the 1960s several similar accumulations were received from solicitors over a wider field — Barnsley, Wath, Snaith and Sherburn-in-Elmet. Archives deposited by industrial firms increased during this period. In 1960 the Library was recognised as the official local repository for certain categories of public local records and a large deposit of colliery records was handed over by the National Coal Board as a result, making a very substantial modern addition (up to 1948) to older colliery records from private sources.

Further strong room accommodation became essential and a small room, 15 feet x 16 feet, was added in the Central Library in 1963 and a larger manuscript store, built onto one of the branch libraries was ready for use in 1969.

By the 1960s most counties had established record offices, the West Riding being one of the few exceptions. Working through the local committees of the National Register of Archives, the two city libraries of Leeds and Sheffield aimed at making some provision for records other than official county records in the north and south of the Riding, respectively.

=== 1974 – 1986 ===
In 1974, with the creation of a new (county) tier of local government for South Yorkshire, the South Yorkshire County Council established a county record office service. For 12 years, until the abolition of the metropolitan county councils in 1986, the South Yorkshire County Record Office (SYCRO) based at Ellin Street in Sheffield, acquired material relating to the county. This was in addition to the existing archive services at Sheffield and Doncaster.

=== 1986 – date ===
In 1986, following abolition, the SYCRO collections were transferred to the custody of Sheffield City Council. The ‘county’ service was funded and managed under a joint arrangement between all four local authorities – Barnsley, Doncaster, Sheffield and Rotherham. Sheffield Archives continued to acquire county archives from 1986. In 1989 the archives moved into a former car showroom premises on Shoreham Street. The building was converted to house all the documents from the Central Library.

== The collections ==
The records preserved by Sheffield Archives date from the 12th century to the present day and relate to Sheffield and the rest of South Yorkshire and parts of North Derbyshire.

=== Local Government records ===
Local government records derive mainly from Sheffield City Council and its departments, including Council and Committee minutes, building plans and school records, and from superseded authorities such as Urban and Rural District Councils, Poor Law Unions, civil townships and the former South Yorkshire County Council. Sheffield was created a corporate borough in 1842 and a city in 1897. The old parish, which was coterminous with the new borough until boundary extensions took place in the 20th century, consisted of six townships.

There is a good series of rate books comprising continuous runs of collectors' books from 1755 for Sheffield township and from the 1780s for four of the other townships. From 1891 borough rate-books for the census years only have been retained. Valuations date from the 1820s and 1830s. These records were kept in the vestry halls of the several wards of the city and thus escaped the destruction by enemy action which befell the records stored in the Union offices in West Bar.

Vestry minutes for several townships from the early nineteenth century have also survived, together with some highway surveyors' records. All the records of the old poor law together with the Guardians' records for both the Sheffield and Ecclesall Unions were destroyed in the West Bar offices. Most of the old workhouse records have likewise disappeared. Apart from runs of Guardians' printed minutes, this important side of local life is very sparsely represented among the official records. A good deal of information about the old poor law can however be gleaned from private collections, especially solicitors' collections.

Practically all of the current council departments and directorates are represented in the Archives collections. Worthy of note are council and committee minutes from 1843 onwards; registers of children's homes from 1894; school records from many hundreds of schools, a full series of claims for damage and loss on account of the Sheffield flood of 1864 caused by the bursting of the Damflask reservoir, through to modern papers on the World Student games of 1991 and the recent urban renaissance project – Heart of the City.

Other public bodies whose records may be mentioned are the Doncaster and Mexborough Joint Hospital Board from 1900 – 1948, the Sheffield Gas Company from 1818, and the Coal Board's pre-vesting date records for this area.

=== Public Records ===
Local public records include Sheffield Quarter Sessions, Magistrate Courts and H.M. Coroners, health authorities and hospitals and records of once nationalised industries such as the National Coal Board for South Yorkshire and the Yorkshire Water Authority.

=== Ecclesiastical records ===
As the Diocesan Record Office for the Archdeaconry of Sheffield, Sheffield Archives holds records for most of the Anglican parishes within the area, including registers, and records of the Diocese itself. Also held are records of the Roman Catholic Diocese of Hallam and its parishes, and numerous records of other denominations such as Methodists and Quakers etc.

Sheffield also holds a cartulary of Beauchief Abbey, a Premonstratensian house formerly in Derbyshire, the site of which is now within the city of Sheffield. The cartulary was used extensively by Samuel Pegge (Historical account of Beauchief Abbey, 1801) but has never been published. Also emanating from the monastery is a small notebook or miscellany containing biblical texts and a note of an ordination in 1500. Both volumes are in the original bindings.

=== Family and estate records ===
==== The Wentworth Woodhouse Collection ====
The Wentworth Woodhouse Collection (Wentworth-Fitzwilliam family) include personal papers of statesmen such as the Earl of Strafford, 2nd Marquis of Rockingham and Edmund Burke. The Wentworths had been at Woodhouse since the thirteenth century. Little however survives from any period prior to the early seventeenth century, except ancient deeds and some Gascoigne pedigrees which remain at Wentworth Woodhouse. The muniments may be said to begin properly with the period of Thomas Wentworth the great Earl of Strafford whose correspondence was preserved with care by the family. The archives of his son William, the 2nd earl, have not survived. Since his death in 1695 the estates have twice passed in the female line, first to Thomas Watson-Wentworth whose son, another Thomas, was created Marquis of Rockingham in 1746, and secondly in 1782 to the 4th Earl Fitzwilliam. Members of each of these families were deeply involved in the politics of the time. Much of their correspondence has survived, and forms, together with the correspondence of Edmund Burke, a prime source for the political history of the eighteenth century.

The Strafford correspondence comprises eleven letter books into which Wentworth's official correspondence was copied by his secretaries, and about 2,800 original letters, including a considerable number of his own letters to his family, servants and friends. Though by far the largest part of the correspondence dates from the last ten years of Wentworth's life (1631–1641), after his appointment as Lord Deputy of Ireland, there is a considerable amount of material even for the years up to 1628, before he held high office. There is naturally much correspondence with the king's ministers, Laud, Cottington, Portland and Secretary Coke, and, at the other end of the scale, many letters full of detail relating to the management of his estates and local affairs. Well-selected letters on national affairs were edited and published in 1739 by William Knowler; more recently Mr J. P. Cooper has published a volume in the Camden series (1973) of Wentworth papers 1597–1628. A vast amount of local interest and many letters from Wentworth's contemporaries remain virtually unknown.

The first Marquis of Rockingham copied selected correspondence into two vast letter books. It relates mainly to the York county elections of 1733 and 1741, the Stuart Rebellion of '45 and letters between him and his son while the latter was in Italy. The son succeeded his father as second Marquis in 1750 and a large amount of his correspondence survives for his two short periods as Prime Minister in 1765 – 1766 and January to July 1782, and for the intermediate period when he held the Whigs together in opposition. Some of these letters were published in 1852 by the Earl of Albemarle, strung together as Memoirs of the Marquis of Rockingham and his contemporaries. Two shortish but valuable studies have appeared since the muniments were deposited here, viz: The early career of Lord Rockingham 1730–1765 by the late Professor G. H. Guttridge, (1952), and Mr P. Langford's The first Rockingham Administration 1765–66, (1973). Rockingham is perhaps regarded as too colourless a figure to merit either a full-scale biography or an edition of his correspondence, though this view scarcely does his personality justice. For American history of the period and for Whig politics this section of the muniments remains of first class importance.

The labours of the Burke editors have now produced nine volumes of Edmund Burke's letters, about half of them from the Sheffield archives. These are virtually all letters from Burke. The bulk of the correspondence here, however, consists of letters addressed to him by a vast number of his contemporaries and relating to topics from America to India; of these the writers' names only are indexed.

The 4th Earl Fitzwilliam's correspondence covering the period 1782–1832, containing over 7,000 letters, has material relating to Ireland, to elections and to many local topics. Of particular interest are the papers concerning working class agitation from 1794 to 1819, ending with the Earl's dismissal from the Lord Lieutenancy of the West Riding at the time of Peterloo. His son, Lord Milton, also played a part in politics until he virtually retired on succeeding to the peerage in 1833. The Yorkshire election archives are extensive.

There is also a vast range of estate material relating to the Irish estates from 1707 and to the West Riding and Malton estates from the 1720s. The stewards' correspondence includes letters from John Carr the architect and there are a number of his original plans for many features in Wentworth House and Park. As with virtually all the great South Yorkshire families, collieries played an important part and are well represented in the Fitzwilliam muniments, up to and including the extensive opencast working on the estate during the last thirty years.

==== Duke of Norfolk's Arundel Castle Manuscripts ====
Archives of more exclusively estate interest are the Duke of Norfolk's Sheffield, Worksop, and Derbyshire estate archives (Arundel Castle manuscripts). The Dukes of Norfolk and their predecessors the Earls of Shrewsbury were lords of the manor of Sheffield (as the present Duke still is), of Worksop, and of Glossop and Glossopdale in Derbyshire. The manuscripts include detailed accounts and rentals (including the Shropshire estates) for the late Elizabethan period. The Sheffield archives are extensive, their main interest lying in the urban development of Sheffield in the eighteenth and nineteenth centuries, including collieries and markets. There is a series of the Sheffield agents' letters and diaries in the nineteenth century. The Worksop records cover in particular the eighteenth century when Worksop was a residence of the dukes. The Glossop records also refer mainly to the nineteenth century when the town became a prosperous manufacturing district and there are records of several turnpike trusts of the Glossop area.

==== Wharncliffe Papers ====
The Earls of Wharncliffe, the Vernon-Wentworths and the Spencer Stanhopes have also deposited their records. Besides estate matters in Scotland, Yorkshire and (a few) Cornwall, they include much correspondence. The small number of letters from Lady Mary Wortley Montagu (about 40 in all) have been published by Professor R. Halsband, in the Complete Letters of Lady Mary Wortley Montagu. A much more extensive group of letters forms basically the correspondence of the first Baroness Wharncliffe and her family, including her mother Lady Erne and her grandfather the 4th Earl of Bristol and spanning the years 1773 to 1845. Much is merely personal but much also concerns the political affairs in which Lord Wharncliffe was involved in the period c. 1820 – 1845, as a Tory. This correspondence remains as it was arranged by Lord Stuart of Wortley when he was preparing, with Caroline Grosvenor, the biography of The First Lady Wharndiffe, which was published in 1927. This work makes limited use of the letters. There is also a run of typed transcripts, made for Lord Stuart of Wortley, which includes originals no longer available.

Secondly, there is a long series of letters, 1856 – 1891, to the 1st Earl (3rd Baron) of Wharncliffe. He moved in the highest society of his day and took an interest in politics (Tory), the church and the arts. He was particularly active on behalf of the southern states in the American civil war and the Southern Independence Association in England. Among his correspondents were Lillie Langtry, Sir Samuel White Baker 'of the Nile', and novelists 'Rolf Boldrewood' and 'Violet Fane'.

==== Wilson Family ====
A family of very different significance is the Wilson family of Sheffield, one member of which was H. J. Wilson, radical M.P. for the Holmfirth division of Yorkshire from 1885 to 1912. His voluminous political papers, docketed by himself, cover the period from 1870 to 1910. They relate to the political topics in which he was interested, including Ireland, South Africa and the control of the opium trade; and to Sheffield constituency politics over many years, including Lib-Lab relations at the beginning of this century. As the Sheffield Smelting Company the Wilsons ran a business for refining precious metal from metallic waste, the records of which form a separate archive. The correspondence of H. J. Wilson's aunt, Mrs Mary Anne Rawson, takes the family record back to the anti-slavery period, a topic in which she was much interested.

==== Edward Carpenter ====
The name of Edward Carpenter (1844–1929) has already been mentioned. Most of his correspondence was received after the publication of the Bibliography of Edward Carpenter by the City Libraries in 1949. It includes series of letters from Olive Schreiner, Havelock and Edith Ellis, Henry and Kate Salt (among others) as well as some of Carpenter's own letters and many from a host of friends in all parts of the world interested in socialism, philanthropy, eastern mysticism, sexual psychology, and the simple life at Holmesfield.

==== Sheffield Literary and Philosophical Society ====
Several other large groups of letters may be mentioned here, each forming part of composite collections. In the Sheffield Literary and Philosophical Society's (SLPS) collection is the correspondence of James Montgomery, Sheffield poet and editor of the Iris newspaper (1771–1854). His correspondents included a number of lesser literary figures of his period (examples are William Roscoe, William Carey, Dr John Aikin, Barbara Hofland, Mrs Basil Montagu) and evangelical Christians on both sides of the Atlantic; his correspondence with Joseph Aston includes the period of Montgomery's trial and imprisonment in 1794. Also in the SLPS collection are letters to Henry Clifton Sorby, the Sheffield geologist, over the period 1844 – 1896.

==== Hunter Archaeological Society ====
Correspondence and diaries of Mrs Margaret Gatty and her daughter, Mrs Juliana H. Ewing, form part of the Hunter Archaeological Society's collection. Both were writers of children's books and Mrs Gatty did interesting work on algae; her correspondence includes letters from authorities in this field and Mrs Ewing's includes letters written by her from Fredericton in Canada and her correspondence with Randolph Caldecott, illustrator of her books (many of his adorned with pen and ink sketches). The period covered is 1830 – 1885.

==== Clarke family of Noblethorpe ====
Industry (particularly coal mining) and landowning naturally go together in many other family archives. Notable in this category are the Clarke family of Noblethorpe's estate and colliery records. This family worked some of the best Silkstone coal in South Yorkshire. Cumulatively their papers give a good picture of the coal trade as carried on by canal and the changeover to rail.

==== Crewe Muniments ====
Among the many collections of South Yorkshire deeds may be mentioned the Crewe muniments, including Bawtry deeds of the Lister family with references to wharves and trade on the river Idle.

=== Business records ===
The rich industrial history of the Sheffield area is represented in the large collections of business records, which cover iron and steel, silver plate, coal mining and cutlery firms to professional firms of solicitors, land surveyors, auctioneers and architects. Many of the city's major industrial concerns have deposited their archives at Sheffield, notably:

The firm of Thomas Bradbury and Sons, silver platers, is represented by day books, ledgers, orders, correspondence, etc., going back to the 1780s. A particular feature of this collection is the fine series of early engraved catalogues of old Sheffield plate.

A collection of 29 massive ledgers of the South Yorkshire and North Derbyshire iron trade carried on by the syndicate of iron-masters of whom William Spencer was one, links up with material in the Spencer Stanhope collection. It was deposited by the Staveley Iron Works and covers the period 1690–1766. The ledgers give detailed information of many aspects of the iron trade and were unknown to Dr A. Raistrick when he wrote 'The South Yorkshire ironmasters, 1690–1750' (Economic History Review, 1939).

There is also one volume of Staveley furnace accounts, 1772–1806. The nail and file trade in Sheffield is represented by orders, correspondence, etc., of the firm of Joseph Bramall, originally of Oughtibridge and subsequently of Sheffield, from 1856 to about 1932. A sheep-shear makers, Burgon & Ball, has records from its commencement in the 1860s; these include much relating to its Australian trade. The firm also had an agency for the sale of bicycles with rubber tyres in the eighteen-nineties and cars early in this century. The technical drawing office records of the Yorkshire Engine Company consist of engine plans and orders and there is also a series of photographs of many engines made by the firm. A selected series of over seventy sales ledgers of Arthur Balfour's (now Balfour Darwin's) illustrates the growth of the firm's trade in steel throughout the world from 1865 to about 1948. Spear & Jackson, tool makers, have also deposited some records. The business of an eighteenth-century hardware (cutlery) merchant is represented by stock and account books of Walter Oborne of Sheffield and subsequently of Ravenfield. Cutlery manufacturing firms, mainly of the nineteenth century, are represented by small deposits of Thomas Nowill & Co., Christopher Johnson & Co., and Ibbotson Bros., and by some orders and correspondence of Joseph Rodgers & Sons rescued from destruction in the 1930s. Reference has already been made to the Sheffield Smelting Company's extensive records. From Thurlstone, bordering on the textile district, have come records of a peculiar trade, the making of hair-cloth and bagging for oil presses, from about 1790-1820s; this archive contains a series of letters from an emigrant to Pittsburg, written to his relatives in Yorkshire.

=== Trade Unions ===
Trades Unionism, another aspect of industrial life, is represented by archives of the local branch of ASLEF (from 1880), the Sawmakers' Protection Society (from 1860), the Pen and Pocket Blade Forgers' and Smithers' Protection Society (from 1870), and the Table-blade Grinders Association (from 1907, on microfilm); not all the records however are continuous from the earliest dates.

=== Solicitors ===
The numerous deposits received from solicitors contain much relating to families, manors, estates and local public business. Notable items among them include records of the Heck and Wentbridge Railway, 1825–28, and some papers relating to the Snaith and Co wick Police Association, 1847–58 (Clark & Co. of Snaith); records of the Sheffield-Wakefield Turnpike trust from 1741 (Wheat and Tibbitts collections); land society trust deeds (Parker collection); some seventeenth-century proceedings of the West Riding commission of sewers (Baxter collection).

=== Fairbank Collection ===
The Fairbank collection, mentioned earlier, containing the firm's draft maps and plans, and their field and survey books, covers the parish of Sheffield and many adjacent areas. As surveyors for local enclosures and turnpike roads, as well as for many private clients, they mapped manors, estates, street developments, single properties and even some collieries. One of their chief clients was the Duke of Norfolk's Sheffield agent, especially over the period from 1770 to 1801, and the Arundel Castle manuscripts include several hundreds of finished plans of various parts of the ducal estates in Sheffield. Together, these two collections must make Sheffield one of the best mapped towns at this period.

=== Architectural Plans ===
Architectural plans have been received from the offices of several firms of architects and represent the work of local architects in the nineteenth and earlier twentieth centuries.

=== Institutions and organisations ===
Records have been deposited by a variety of different bodies such as political parties, trades unions, clubs, societies, charities, trusts and independent schools. Some are mentioned above.

=== Individuals ===
The letters, diaries and personal papers of many individuals from all walks of life have been deposited, including those as diverse as Edward Carpenter, Mrs Gatty and David Blunkett MP.

=== Maps ===
A unique and vast accumulation of maps and surveys, mostly from the 18th and 19th centuries, in the Fairbank Collection, as well as enclosure, tithe and Ordnance Survey maps.

=== Other records ===
Photographs, including a series of aerial photographs, and audio recordings from Radio Sheffield.
