= Mason and Hamlin Prize =

The Mason and Hamlin Prize was a national piano competition, sponsored by Mason and Hamlin. The grand prize was a Mason and Hamlin grand piano. The competition is held annually in Jordan Hall, New England Conservatory, Boston, Massachusetts.

== Winners ==
- 1910 – Julius Chaloff
- 1919 – Naomi Bevard
- 1920 – Jesús María Sanromá
- 1925 – William Beller
- 1927 – Luise Hedwig Bube
- 1935 – Peter Louis Walters
- 1975 – Joseph Evans (professor and chairman of the Music Department, Michigan State University)
- 2007 – Nathan James Knutson
