= William Albert Beller =

American pianist (1900–1986)

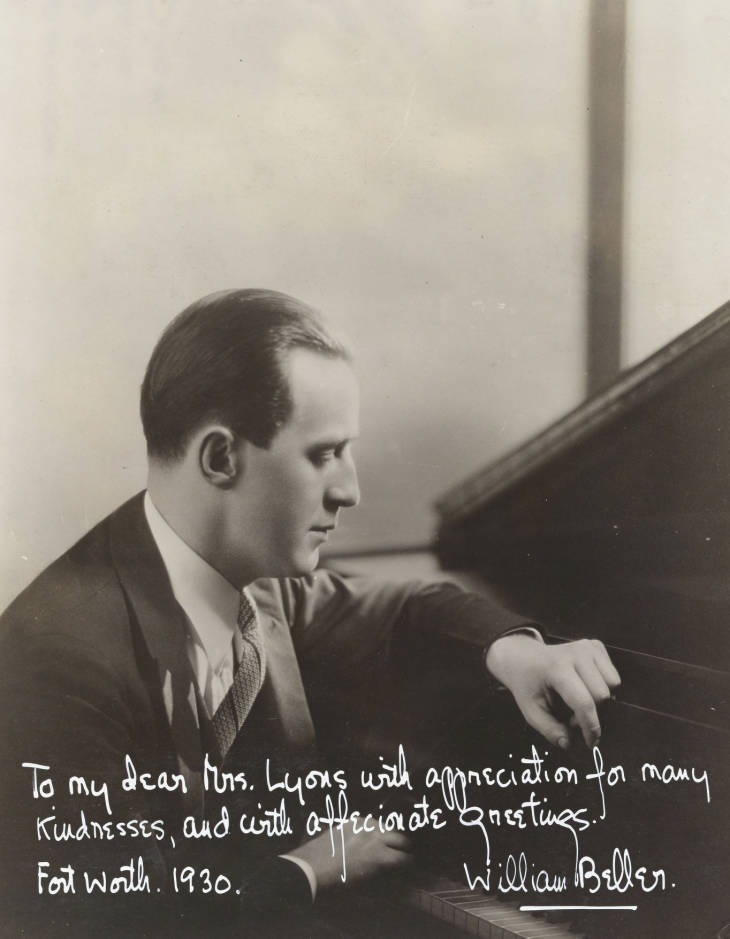
Beller, c. 1930

William Albert Beller (July 19, 1900 – February 20, 1986) was an American concert pianist and professor of music at Marquette University and Columbia University. He was deemed a musical prodigy when he was 4 years old. He had also taught piano at the Bronx House Music School in the 1930s.

== Life ==
In 1916, Beller won scholarship at the Chicago Musical College, where, in 1917, he received a Senior Diploma with the Diamond Medal for Excellence in Scholarship. In 1918, he received a Graduate Medal; and in 1921, a Bachelor of Music degree with a prize of a grand piano. At some point, upon one of his graduations, he received a gold medal.

Beller studied piano for two years with Arthur L.J. Frazier (1881–1973), (ii) with Howard Wells in Chicago, with Tobias Matthay, and, in 1926, with Josef Lhevinne in New York City under a Juilliard fellowship. In 1925, while in Chicago, Beller worked for Lyon & Healy and was a Duo-Art artist.

When Beller arrived in New York, he was represented by NBC Artists Service (a.k.a. National Broadcasting and Concert Bureau), George W. Engles (1890–1963), managing director, RCA Building, New York City.

From 1930 to 1935 as a visiting professor, Beller taught piano in Dallas (Dallas Conservatory of Music and Fine Arts), Denton (Texas Woman's University), and Fort Worth (Fort Worth Conservatory) during the summers. The Dallas Conservatory was essentially a collection of music teachers led by Carl Wiesemann in the 1930s who taught from the Terrill School. In the summer of 1934, Beller and Joseph Brinkman (1901–1960) gave a four-week series of lecture-recitals on Bach, Haydn, Mozart, Beethoven, Schubert, Schumann, Chopin, Brahms, Debussy, and Ravel as part of a graduate seminar at the University of Michigan. Beller also taught piano in Hartford, Ann Arbor, and Chicago. Beller also maintained a private studio at Carnegie Hall.

== Students ==
Columbia University

- Kenneth Lee Ascher (jazz pianist, composer)
- Mark Paul Malkovich III (born 1930), (concert pianist, chamber music expert)
- Michael Shapiro, (BA, CC 1962)
- Joelle Wallach (studied with Beller while working on her masters at Columbia University from 1966 to 1971)

== Honors ==
- 1925 — Winner, Piano, National Federation of Music Clubs. Each biennium, the Wisconsin Federation of Music Clubs sponsored a contest for young artists and student musicians, in all classes of music, piano, voice, violin, organ, and cello. The winners of the contest compete with winners of the same contest from Illinois, Iowa and Nebraska; and the winners from that district appear in the finals at the meeting of the National Federation, a composed of twelve districts of the United States. Beller won the National competition in Portland, Oregon, which included a $500 prize.
- 1925 — Winner, Mason and Hamlin Prize, thereupon presented as soloist with the Chicago Symphony Orchestra
- 1926 — Awarded a Juilliard Fellowship with Josef Lhévinne
