= Mason & Hamlin =

American piano manufacturer

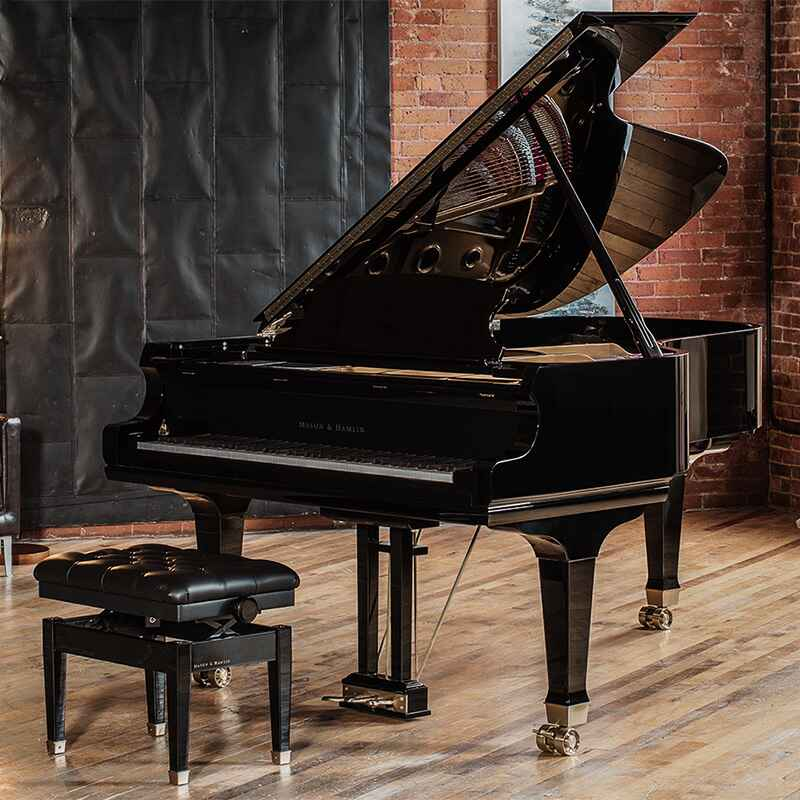
- Type: Private
- Industry: Musical instruments
- Founded: 1854; 172 years ago
- Founder: Henry Mason and Emmons Hamlin
- Headquarters: Haverhill, Massachusetts, USA; 42°46′39″N 71°05′11″W, Boston, United States
- Area served: Worldwide
- Products: • Grand pianos • Upright pianos
- Production output: 150-200
- Owner: Kirk Burgett
- Parent: Burgett, Inc.
- Website: masonhamlin.com

Mason & Hamlin is an American manufacturer of handcrafted grand and upright pianos, based in Haverhill, Massachusetts. Founded in 1854, it is one of two surviving American piano manufacturers from the "Golden Age" of pianos, along with Steinway & Sons.

== History ==
=== 19th century ===
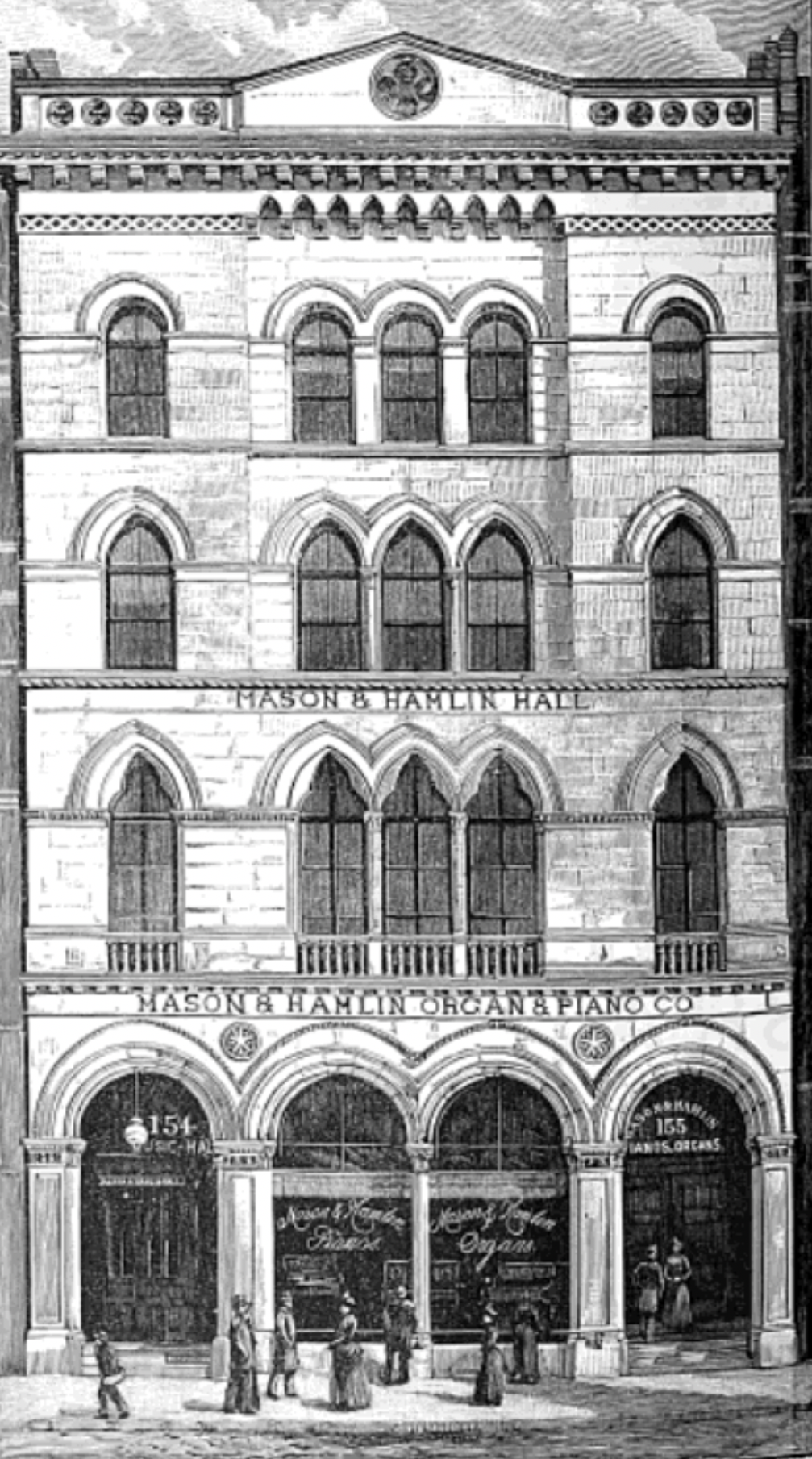
1890 sketch of Mason & Hamlin Hall, Boston.

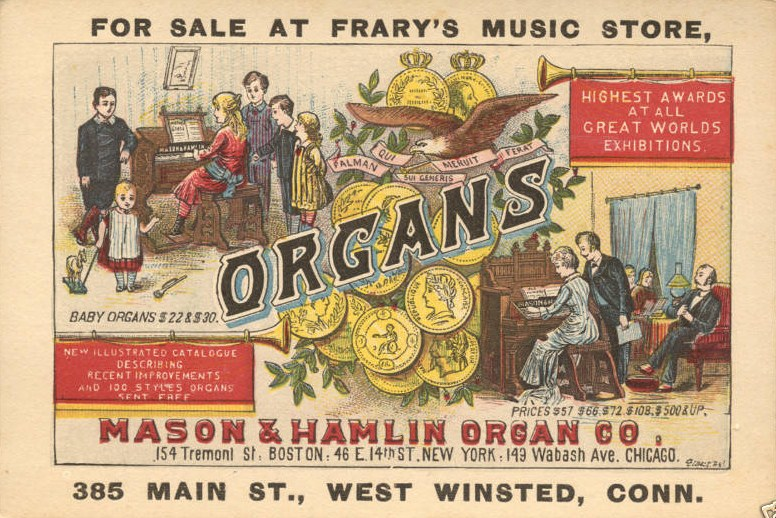
Mason & Hamlin trade card from the 19th century

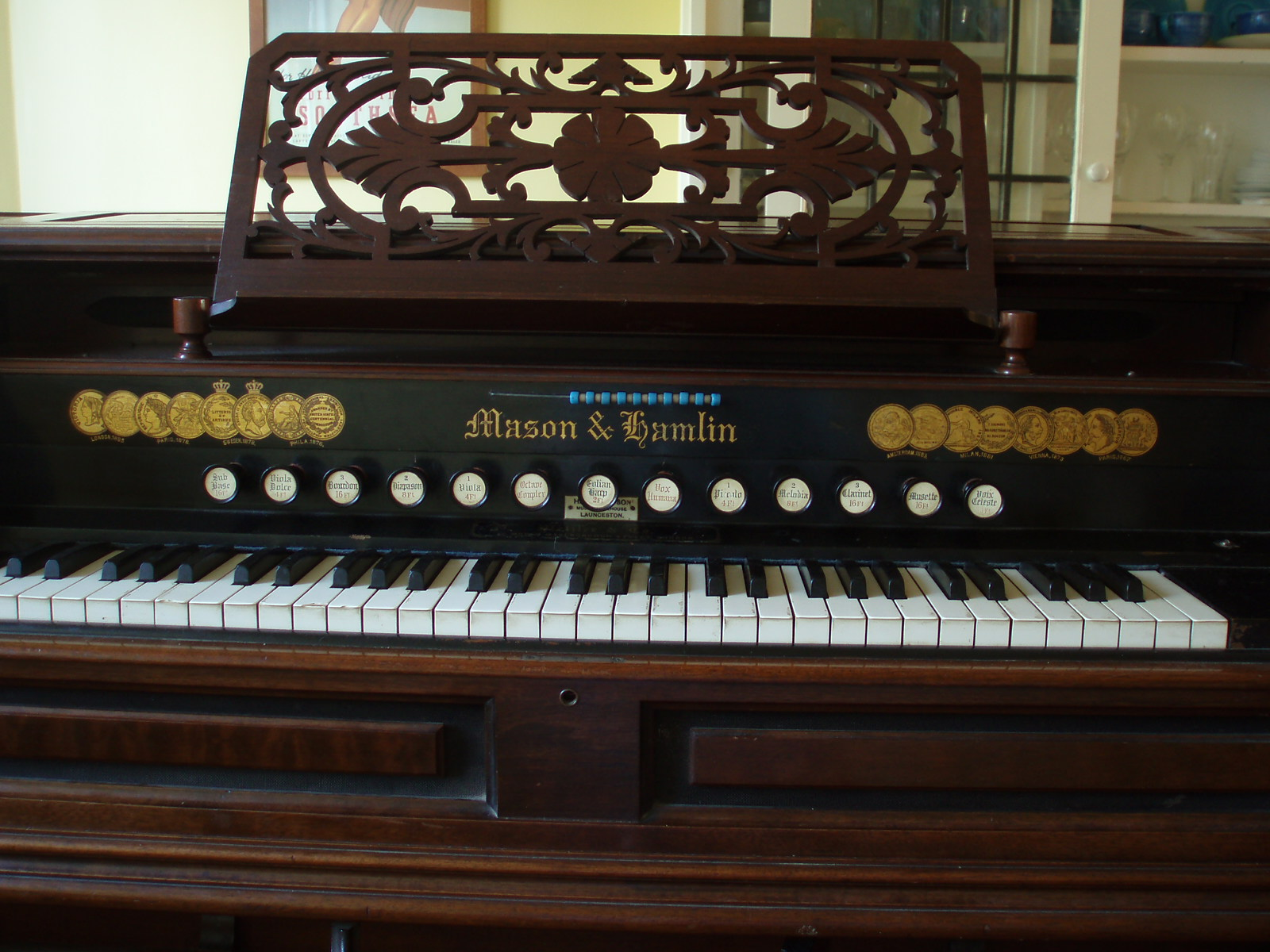
An 1895 Mason & Hamlin Model 512 reed organ. Displayed above the keyboard are the various medals and awards won by the company at international exhibitions.

Detail of an 1894 Mason & Hamlin upright piano, showing the "screw stringer" apparatus.

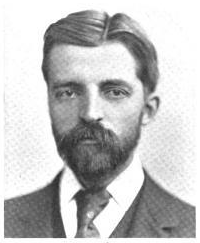
Edward P. Mason, of Mason & Hamlin, 1892

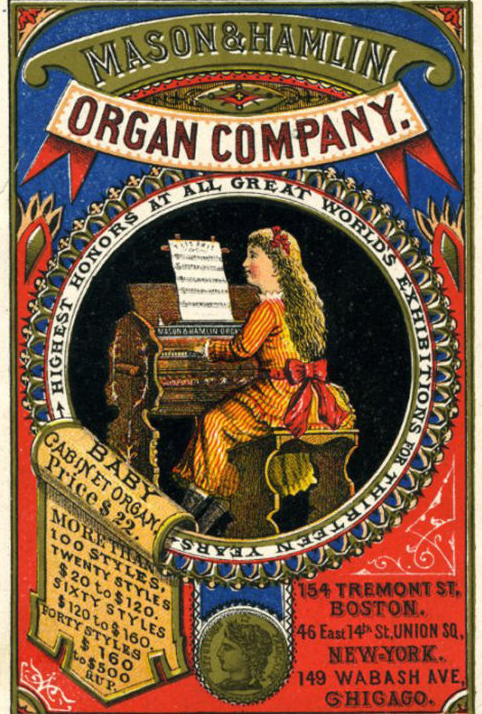
Trade card, 19th century

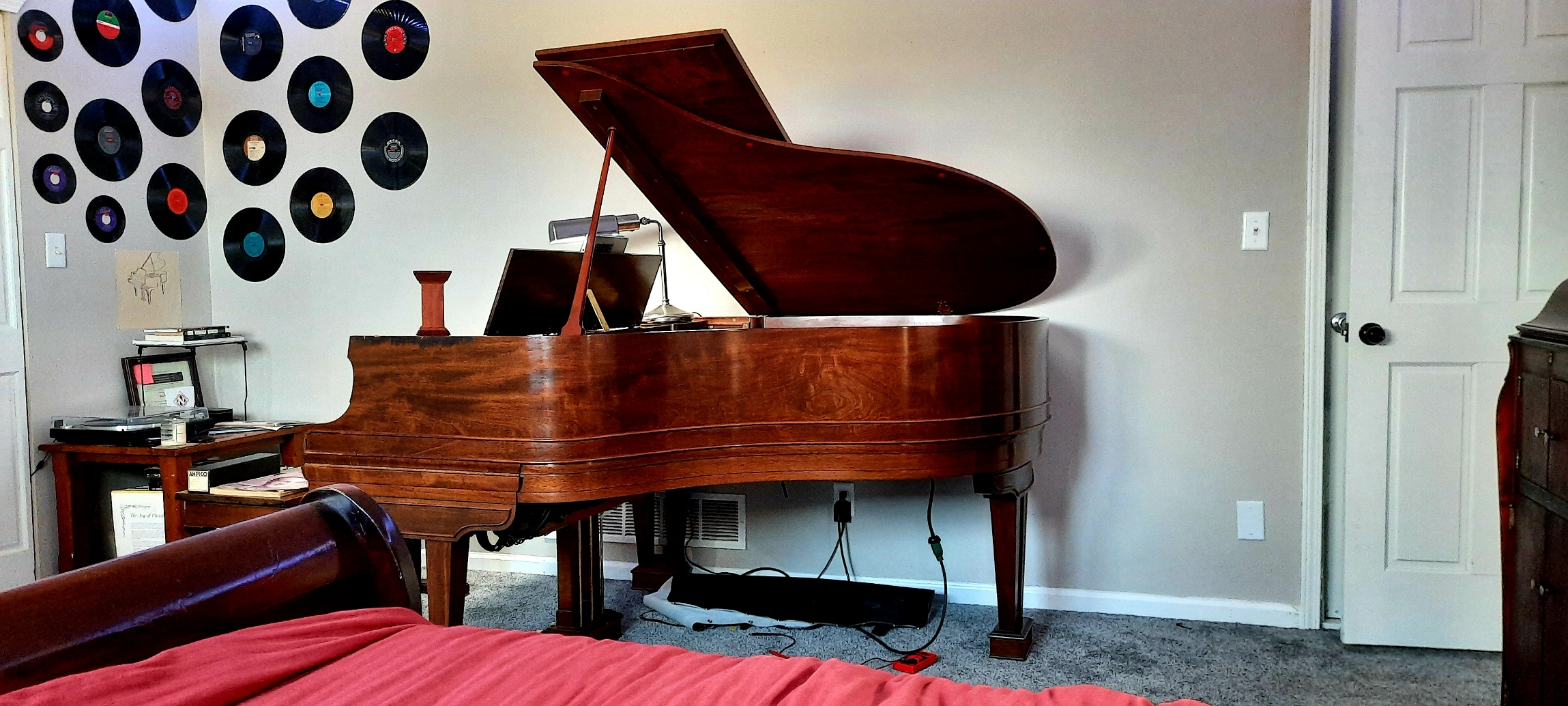
1926 Mason and Hamlin Model RA 5'8" piano equipped with AMPICO reproducing player mechanism

Mason & Hamlin was founded in Boston, Massachusetts, in 1854 by Henry Mason, son of Lowell Mason, the American hymn composer and musical educator, and Emmons Hamlin, a mechanic and inventor who had worked for melodeon makers Prince & Co. in Buffalo, New York.

They originally manufactured only melodeons, but in 1855 introduced the organ-harmonium or flat-topped cabinet organ. This design placed the bellows vertically and underneath the reeds, and served as the model for the suction-operated American-style reed organ. By the early 1870s, they were considered the largest and most important manufacturer of reed organs, employing about 500 people and producing as many as 200 instruments a week. Mason & Hamlin supplied organs to several prominent composers, notably Franz Liszt, whose name the company applied to their patented selective sustain mechanism for organs comparable to the sostenuto in pianos.

Mason & Hamlin began manufacturing pianos in 1883. Initially they built only upright pianos featuring a patented method of tuning and maintaining string tension which they marketed as the screw stringer and intended as an improvement over the traditional system with tuning pins. In 1895, the piano department was reorganized by Richard W. Gertz, an independent piano designer from Germany who had created new scales for them earlier that year. Gertz was elected secretary of the company in 1903, and president in 1906, and had patented the company's Tension Resonator, a device fastened to the perimeter of the wooden structure of pianos meant to prevent their sounding boards from flattening. This was first included in their grands in 1900, and eventually became a signature feature used into the 21st century.

=== 20th century ===
The Cable Company, a Chicago piano manufacturing company, purchased the majority interest in Mason & Hamlin in 1904, when the Golden Age of the Piano was in full force. The most illustrious concert artists of the day aligned themselves with piano manufacturers; Sergei Rachmaninoff used a Mason & Hamlin to make his 1924 recording of his Second Piano Concerto. Composer Maurice Ravel said of Mason & Hamlin pianos, "While preserving all the qualities of the percussion instrument, the Mason & Hamlin pianoforte also serves magnificently the composer's concept by its extensive range in dynamics, as well as quality of tone. It is not short of being a small orchestra. In my opinion, the Mason & Hamlin is a real work of art."

In 1924, Cable sold its interest in Mason & Hamlin to the American Piano Company. American positioned Mason & Hamlin as the "artist's brand" among the firm's premier lines, which also included Chickering and Sons ("family use") and Wm. Knabe & Co. ("Metropolitan Opera's favorite").

American's sales began to decline in 1928 and collapsed after the stock market crash in late 1929. Mason & Hamlin's trademark, inventory, and equipment were sold to American's competitor Aeolian for $450,000 ($8,440,000 today) while the factory buildings were sold off separately by the end of the following year.

In 1932, American itself merged with Aeolian, consolidating the control of more than 20 brands of pianos in the Aeolian-American Company. Mason & Hamlin, which had been at the former Hallet, Davis & Company piano factory in Neponset, Massachusetts, was moved to a separate plant at the Aeolian-American complex in East Rochester, New York. The company began sponsoring the Mason and Hamlin Prize piano competition.

Piano manufacturing ceased in the United States in 1942 under authority of the War Production Board due to World War II, and Mason & Hamlin production shifted to military gliders.

The company changed hands several times during the post-war era, becoming part of the Sohmer piano company in 1985. Over the decades, the designs of the pianos were altered to the extent that they had little in common with the "classic" Mason & Hamlin pianos of the pre-Depression era.

In 1989, Seattle businessman Bernard "Bud" Greer purchased the Sohmer company, which also held the George Steck, Knabe, and Mason & Hamlin names, technical specifications, and manufacturing equipment. He moved these to a piano factory in Haverhill, Massachusetts, which he had recently purchased from piano manufacturer Santi Falcone—from whom he also purchased the Falcone manufacturing specifications and naming rights. He named the new enterprise the Mason & Hamlin Companies. Greer's goal was to resurrect the Mason & Hamlin pianos of the pre-Depression era by returning to the original specifications—including Gertz's scale designs—and use of materials. A few changes were made, including the use of Renner action parts and slightly longer keys. From 1990 to 1994, about 600 pianos were manufactured, mostly Model A and BB grands, along with a few Model 50 uprights. Greer sold the company in 1995 to Premier Pianos, which continued production at a reduced pace until selling the company in 1996.

=== Today ===
In 1996, Mason & Hamlin was acquired by Burgett, Inc., which also owns PianoDisc, a maker of reproducing piano systems of the same name. Kirk Burgett, after taking control of Mason & Hamlin, had engineers digitally reconstruct blueprints of the company's high-quality pianos in the early 1900s, acquired decades-old specialized tools, and trained the first employees for two years, in order to produce pianos with a high level of craftsmanship like the offerings from the late 19th century and early 20th century.

Mason & Hamlin pianos are still manufactured in Haverhill and distributed throughout the U.S., Canada, Europe, and Asia. Mason & Hamlin is a member of NAMM, the International Music Products Association and Piano Manufacturers Association International.

Each Mason & Hamlin piano includes a Tension Resonator, which is a system of steel rods under moderate tension, anchored to the wooden structure on the opposite side of the sounding board from the strings and iron frame. In grand pianos, these rods fan out from one or two central hubs and are attached at intervals around the rim and to the belly rail; the Model 50 upright has a rod stretched between the case sides. The manufacturer claims that this adds strength and rigidity to the rim by locking the rim into its permanent shape and which in turn preserves the "crown" of the soundboard.

== Models ==
=== Grand pianos ===
Current models:

- Mason & Hamlin
  - CC: 9 ft 4in (284.48 cm)
  - BB: 6 ft 11.5in (212.09 cm
  - AA: 6 ft 4in (193.04 cm)
  - A: 5 ft 8.5in (174 cm)
  - B: 5 ft 4in (162.56 cm)
- VX Series
  - VX Series CC: 9 ft 4in (284.5 cm)
- Artist Series
  - MHA-188G: 6 ft 4in (193.04 cm)
  - MHA-160G: 5 ft 3in (160.02 cm)
- Classic Series
  - MHC-160G: 5 ft 6in (167.64 cm)
  - MHC-150G: 4 ft 11in (149.86 cm)

=== Upright pianos ===
Current models:

- Mason & Hamlin
  - Model 50
- Artist Series
  - MHA 131U: 51in (129.54 cm)
  - MHA 123U: 48in (121.92 cm)
- Classic Series
  - MHC 120U: 47in (119.38 cm)
