= Arthur Batelle Whiting =

American composer and pianist (1861–1936)

Arthur Whiting
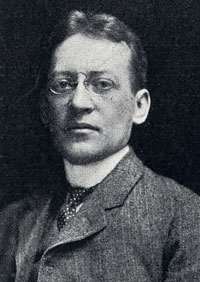
- Born: June 20, 1861; Cambridge, Massachusetts, United States
- Died: July 20, 1936 (aged 75); Beverly, Massachusetts, United States
- Education: Royal Music School, Munich
- Known for: Lecture series on classical music, compositions
- Spouse: Grace Kneeland Gorham Whiting
- Awards: 1905 – membership in American Academy of Arts and Letters
- Scientific career
- Fields: Classical music
- Workplaces: Various
- Academic advisors: Josef Gabriel Rheinberger, Hans Bussmeyer
- Notable students: D. G. Mason

Arthur Batelle Whiting (June 20, 1861 – July 20, 1936) was an American teacher, pianist, composer, and writer on music, known for his conservative compositional style, espousal of early music, and his long-running university lecture-recital series.

== Biography ==
Whiting was born on June 20, 1861, in Cambridge, Massachusetts, son of Charles Edward and Emma Reeves Leland Whiting. He began studying piano at the age of 8 with his mother. A few years later, he left school and was placed under the instruction of his uncle, organist and composer George E. Whiting, who gave him lessons in the organ. He continued studying the piano; in 1873 or 1874, at the age of 13, he began his career as a concert pianist, in a concert in Worcester, Massachusetts. In 1877, he was appointed organist at a church in South Boston and eventually became organist at All Saints Church, Worcester, MA, where he remained for three years. Whiting studied at the New England Conservatory for five years, approximately from 1880 to 1885, probably coinciding with his organist position. There he studied piano with William Hall Sherwood and harmony, counterpoint, and composition with George Whitefield Chadwick. During this time he continued to give piano recitals in Boston and Worcester.

From 1883 to 1885 Whiting studied in Germany at the Royal Music School in Munich. He studied with Josef Gabriel Rheinberger, who inspired in Whiting an interest in vocal and choral music, and also gave him "a strong connection to the music of Bach and Brahms". Rheinberger was known for a caustic teaching style, very much like the one Whiting later developed. Whiting also studied piano with Prof. Hans Bussmeyer (1853–1930), head of the piano department at the School and continued concertizing while in Munich. Along with fellow American students H. W. Parker and H. H. Huss, he received their highest honors in composition and many performances of his student works.

In 1885, Whiting returned to America, and settled back in Boston. He married into a prominent New England family; his wife's name was Grace Kneeland. During this time, he devoted himself mostly to composing, in small forms predominantly.

In 1895, he and his wife moved to New York City. There he performed frequently as a concert pianist, as soloist with several American orchestras, gave solo recitals, and played with chamber ensembles. At this time, Whiting began to composer in larger forms. An early success was his "Floriana: Overheard In the Garden," a setting of Oliver Herford's cycle of poems by that title, which was first performed in New York in 1902. In New York, he also taught piano (and possibly composition). He was a "tough-love" kind of teacher. He was harsh, often mockingly humorous, in his criticisms of his students, but at least some of them felt that it was well-meant. He frequently offered the same blunt criticisms of his adult friends' music, as well as of his own. In 1905 he was elected to the National Institute of Arts and Letters. Sometime during his career, he was head of the Organ Department at the Cincinnati College of Music, under Theodore Thomas.

His main claim to fame during his lifetime was a yearly lecture/recital series on chamber music that continued from 1907 until 1930. He gave these lectures at Harvard, Princeton, Yale, and Columbia universities. Their purpose was to generate interest in music among the undergraduate students there. After these began, Whiting mostly gave up composing.

Through the years, Whiting also occasionally wrote on the subject of music. His essays were published in the Yale Review, The Outlook, New Music Review, and in newspapers like the New York Times. In his later years he regretted not composing more.

Whiting died on July 20, 1936, in Beverly, Massachusetts.

== Musical style ==
Whiting was not a prolific composer. When he did write, he composed mostly in small forms. Stylistically, he was considered to be a Classicist, influenced by Bach and Brahms. (He admitted to friend and former student D. G. Mason that he also enjoyed music by impressionists Debussy, Ravel, and Loeffler, which was popular at the time.)

Whiting also admired early music. He was an early advocate for historically informed performance practices. In his archival collection at the New York Public Library for the Performing Arts are transcriptions for piano of toccatas and suites by Bach and Handel. Whiting perhaps performed them at the harpsichord in a series of concerts he gave in 1911. He also wrote an article in New Music Review in 1908 called "The Lesson of the Clavichord", which was re-printed as a pamphlet in 1909. It was, according to D. G. Mason, "an impassioned plea for the subtle and suggestive as opposed to the brutal sensationalism prevalent in contemporary music", which was exemplified in his opinion by the compositions of Richard Strauss.

He was critical of the contemporary efforts of his fellow composers to create an American style of art music. This was especially evident in 1915–1917, when he became engaged in a literary battle about the position of the American composer, expressing in various newspapers his opinion that American works and their creators weren't in the least denigrated.

== Selected works ==
- Concerto in D Minor, Op.6
- Fantasia for Piano and Orchestra, Op.11
- Floriana: Overheard In the Garden (1902)
- The Golden Cage; a Dance Pageant (his most popular work; published in several different arrangements – see the Library for Performing Arts' Whiting collection, and other items in their main catalog)
- Our Country (a choral march; performed at the inauguration of President Taft in 1909)
- The Desert Shall Rejoice, anthem for organ and choir
- Organ music
- Chamber music for various combinations of instruments
- Arrangements of French and English folk songs
- Transcriptions for piano of toccatas and suites of Bach and Handel
