= Chim Chim Cheree and Other Children's Choices =

Studio album by Burl Ives
- Released: 1964
- Genre: Children's
- Length: 27:20
- Label: Disneyland

Chim Chim Cheree and Other Children's Choices is a children's album by Burl Ives backed by Disneyland's Children's Chorus. It was released in 1964 by Disneyland Records (catalog no. ST-3927). The album was recorded at Sunset Sound Recorders in Hollywood. Salvado "Tutti" Camarata, the musical director at Disneyland Records, was the album's producer. The audio engineers were Bruce Botnick, known for his later work with The Doors, and Brian Ross-Myring.

The album was nominated for a Grammy Award in the category "Best Recording for Children". It was reissued in 1998 as the first release from the "Disney's Archive Collection."

AllMusic gave the album a rating of four-and-a-half stars. Reviewer Stephen Thomas Erlewine wrote that the album "retains its charm, not only for aging boomers and Gen-Xers, but also for young children, since this music is simply delightful."

== Track listing ==
Side A

1. "Chim Chim Cheree" (Richard M. Sherman, Robert B. Sherman, from Mary Poppins) [2:28]
2. "Swingin' on a Star" (Johnny Burke, Jimmy Van Heusen) [2:59]
3. "Funiculi Finicula" (Luigi Denza, Howard Johnson) [2:10]
4. "Who's Afraid of the Big Bad Wolf" (Ann Ronell, Frank Churchill) [1:45]
5. "Polly Wolly Doodle" (American traditional, public domain) [2:03]
6. "Let's Go Fly a Kite" (Richard Sherman, Robert Sherman, from Mary Poppins) [1:20]

Side B

1. "A Spoonful of Sugar" (Richard Sherman, Robert Sherman, from Mary Poppins) [1:58]
2. "Constantinople" (Harry Carlton) [2:07]
3. "Lavender Blue, Dilly Dilly" (Eliot Daniel, Larry Morey) [2:15]
4. "Mairzy Doats" (Al Hoffman, Jerry Livingston, Milton Drake) [2:05]
5. "The World by a Tail" (Albert Hague, Langston Hugues) [1:15]
6. "Ilkey Moor Bar'tat" (English traditional, public domain) [3:21]
