= Thomas Clark (composer) =

English composer of West Gallery music

Thomas Clark (1775–1859) was a Canterbury shoemaker (cordwainer) and a prolific composer of West Gallery music, especially for the Nonconformist churches of the South East of England. Sally Drage, writing in the New Grove Dictionary of Music and Musicians, notes that he was 'particularly influential as the composer of early Sunday School collections'.

Clark was born in St Peter's parish in Canterbury and baptized on 5 February 1775. He was apprenticed as a shoemaker to his father, William Clark, and became a Freeman of the City of Canterbury in 1796 on completion of his apprenticeship as he was the son of a Freeman.

He married Anne Ledger in St George's Church, Canterbury, in November 1806. He took over the family business on his father's death in 1823. He retired from business in about 1842-3. He died in Canterbury on 30 May 1859, aged 84.

Clark served as precentor in a Wesleyan chapel and took to composing hymn tunes. The best-known of his tunes is Cranbrook: it was originally set to the words "Grace 'tis a charming sound" written by Philip Doddridge, and published in Clark's first book A Sett of Psalm & Hymn Tunes [1805]. Cranbrook was later used as a tune for the Christmas carol "While shepherds watched their flocks" and is now better known as the tune of the Yorkshire song "On Ilkla Moor Baht 'at".

Two other tunes by Clark were included in the 1933 Methodist Hymn Book with Tunes: they are Crediton (tune 565), which was first published in Clark's Second Set of Psalm Tunes ... with symphonies & an instrumental bass, adapted to the use of country choirs [c. 1807], and Warsaw (tune 606), which was first published in his Third Set of Psalm & Hymn Tunes [1807].

== Publications ==
(from Tony Singleton's article)

- 12 sets of Psalm & Hymn Tunes, 1805 to 1821
- Twelve Tunes in Peculiar Metre, ca.1810
- 9 sets of Psalm Tunes from 1805 to ca.1825 (the third set contains a Magnificat and Nunc Dimittis)
- Te Deum Laudamus and Jubilate Deo, ca.1808
- Several anthems published singly from ca.1808 onwards
- Sacred Gleaner, ca.1826-7
- Congregational Harmonist in 4 volumes from 1828 - ca.1835 (Editor)
- Union Harmonist 1841 (Arranger)
- The Juvenile Harmonist, 1842
- The Seraphim or Sacred Harmonist, 1842
- The Union Tune Book - revised and enlarged (Editor), ca.1842
- David's Harp (settings for all 150 Psalms) 1844
- British Psalmody, with Alexander Hume, pub.Edinburgh, 1844
- The Union Tune Book, continuation, 1854
