= The Battle of Trafalgar (Tate) =

1808 painting by J. M. W. Turner

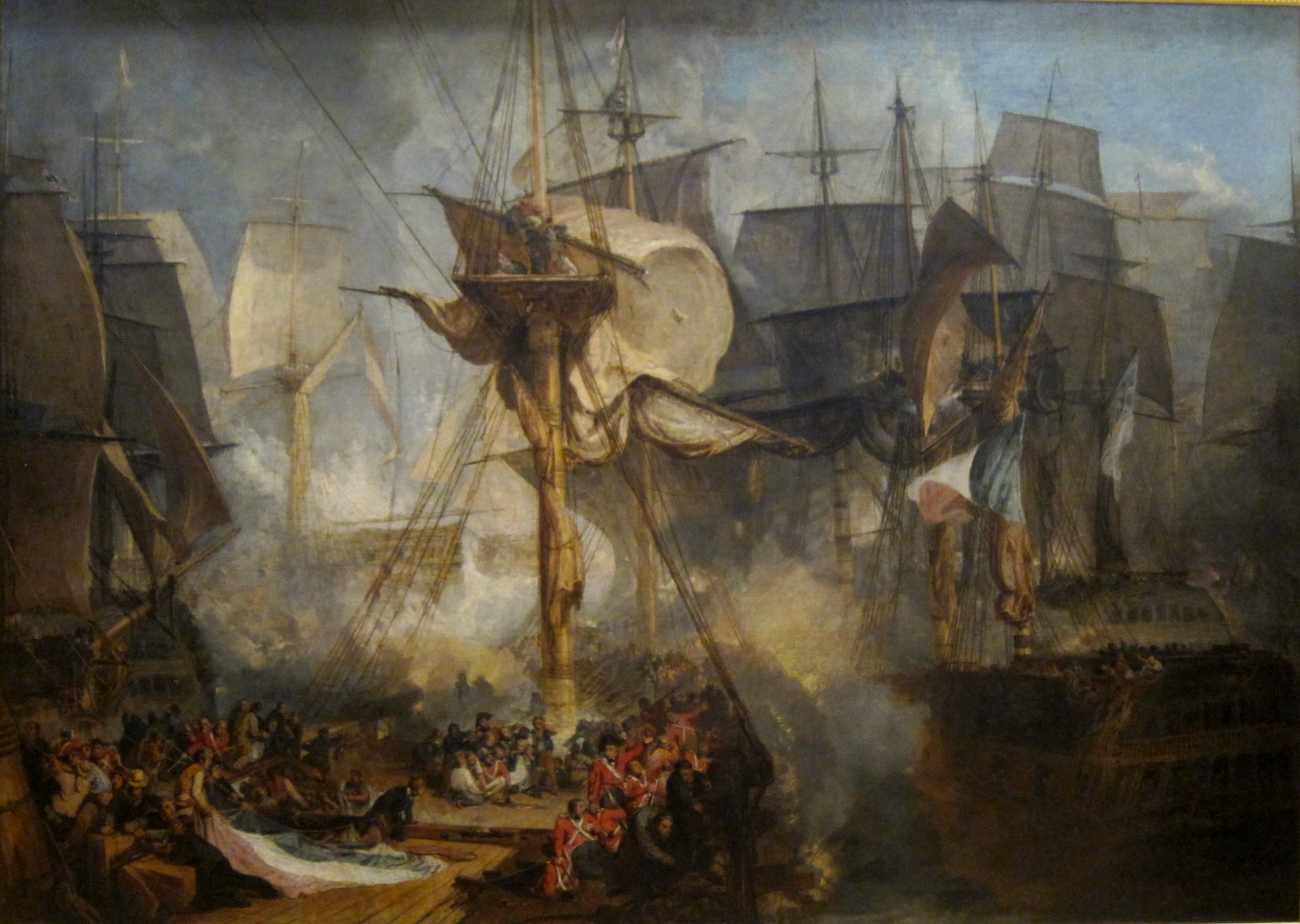
- Artist: J. M. W. Turner
- Year: c. 1808
- Type: Oil on canvas, history painting
- Dimensions: 172.7 cm × 238.8 cm (68.0 in × 94.0 in)
- Location: Tate Britain, London
- Website: www.tate.org.uk/...n00480

The Battle of Trafalgar is a c. 1808 history painting by the British artist J. M. W. Turner. It captures the moment the British Admiral Horatio Nelson, 1st Viscount Nelson was hit by a French sniper on the deck of his flagship HMS Victory during the 1805 Battle of Trafalgar during his last but decisive victory over a combined French-Spanish fleet. It is also known by the longer title The Battle of Trafalgar, as Seen from the Mizen Starboard Shrouds of the Victory.

On the deck of the ship of the line Victory, amidst the raging battle, figures gathers around the fallen Nelson, while a group of Redcoated Marines exchange fire with those aboard the French ship Redoutable from which the ultimately fatal shot had come. The backdrop features a cluster of sails from the various ships of the line, and the general wreckage of the battle.

Nelson's heroic death was a popular subject in British art, with Benjamin West's The Death of Nelson enjoying great success in 1806. Rather than display it at the Royal Academy, Turner initially exhibited at his own studio gallery in Marylebone in 1806 and then, having significantly reworked it, at the British Institution's 1808 exhibition.

== Critical reception ==
In general, critics considered it a masterful painting. The Repository of Arts magazine wrote:

Mr Turner … has detailed the death of his hero [but also] suggested the whole of a great naval victory, which we believe has never before been successfully accomplished if it has been before attempted, in a single picture.

While it also drew praise from John Landseer, the President of the Royal Academy, Benjamin West was more critical of the "miserably bad" figures.

== Background ==
When Turner learned that Nelson's body would be brought to London in his flagship, the Victory, he went there to make sketches of the ship from all angles. Interested in getting witness accounts of what had happened, he interviewed crew members to get the details, including the position of the officers of the ship during the battle.

The knowledge he obtained from his investigative journalism is clearly seen in the resulting painting. As its title indicates, the viewer point of view is up above, at the right hand rear of the ship, which provides a wide angle view of the Victory's deck. Next to the painting, he placed a hand-written description with a numbered legend identifying the officers, many of which he had interviewed. The smoke and closeness between the enemy ships creates a sense of confusion; a brilliant depiction of the "fog of war" in the high seas.

== Provenance ==
The painting was part of the Turner Bequest to the nation following the artist's death in 1851 and is now in the collection of the Tate Britain in Pimlico.

== Related works ==
In 1822 Turner produced another, different painting The Battle of Trafalgar depicting the battle. A royal commission from King George IV, secured for Turner by the lobbying of his friend Thomas Lawrence, it was the largest ever painting he produced. Unfortunately, the painting was rejected and none of his paintings would enter the Royal Collection.

In 1838 he would paint The Fighting Temeraire, depicting the return to London of one of the last large sailing ships that participated in the Battle of Trafalgar.

== See also ==
- List of paintings by J. M. W. Turner

== Bibliography ==
- Bailey, Anthony. J.M.W. Turner: Standing in the Sun. Tate Enterprises, 2013.
- Costello, Leo. J.M.W. Turner and the Subject of History. Routledge, 2017.
- Tracy, Nicholas. Britannia’s Palette: The Arts of Naval Victory. McGill-Queen's Press, 2007.
