= On Ilkla Moor Baht 'at =

Folk song from Yorkshire, England

English: "On Ilkley Moor without a hat"
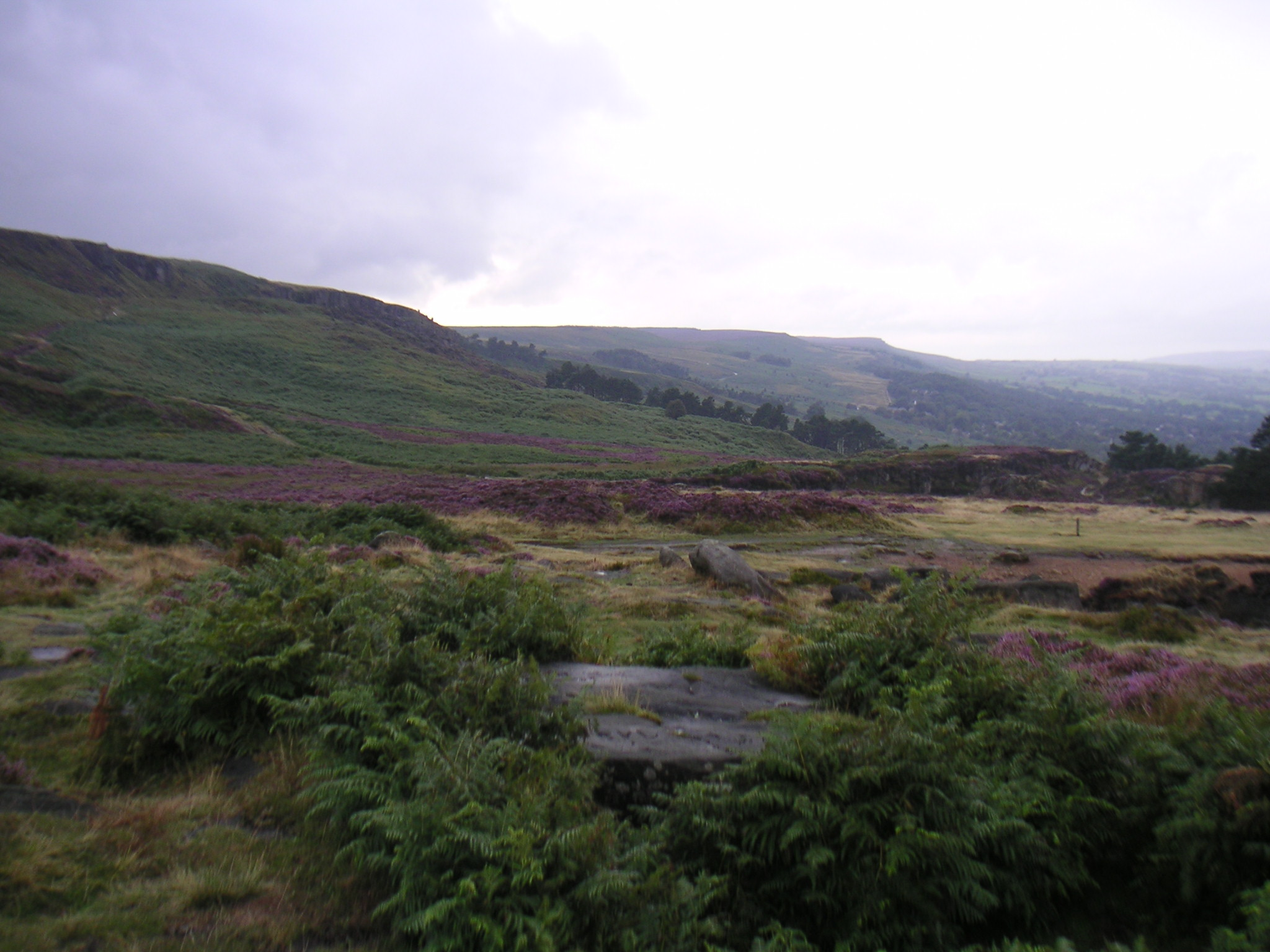
- Ilkley Moor, setting of the song
- Unofficial regional anthem of Yorkshire
- Lyrics: Unknown, 1850s–1870s
- Music: Thomas Clark, 1805

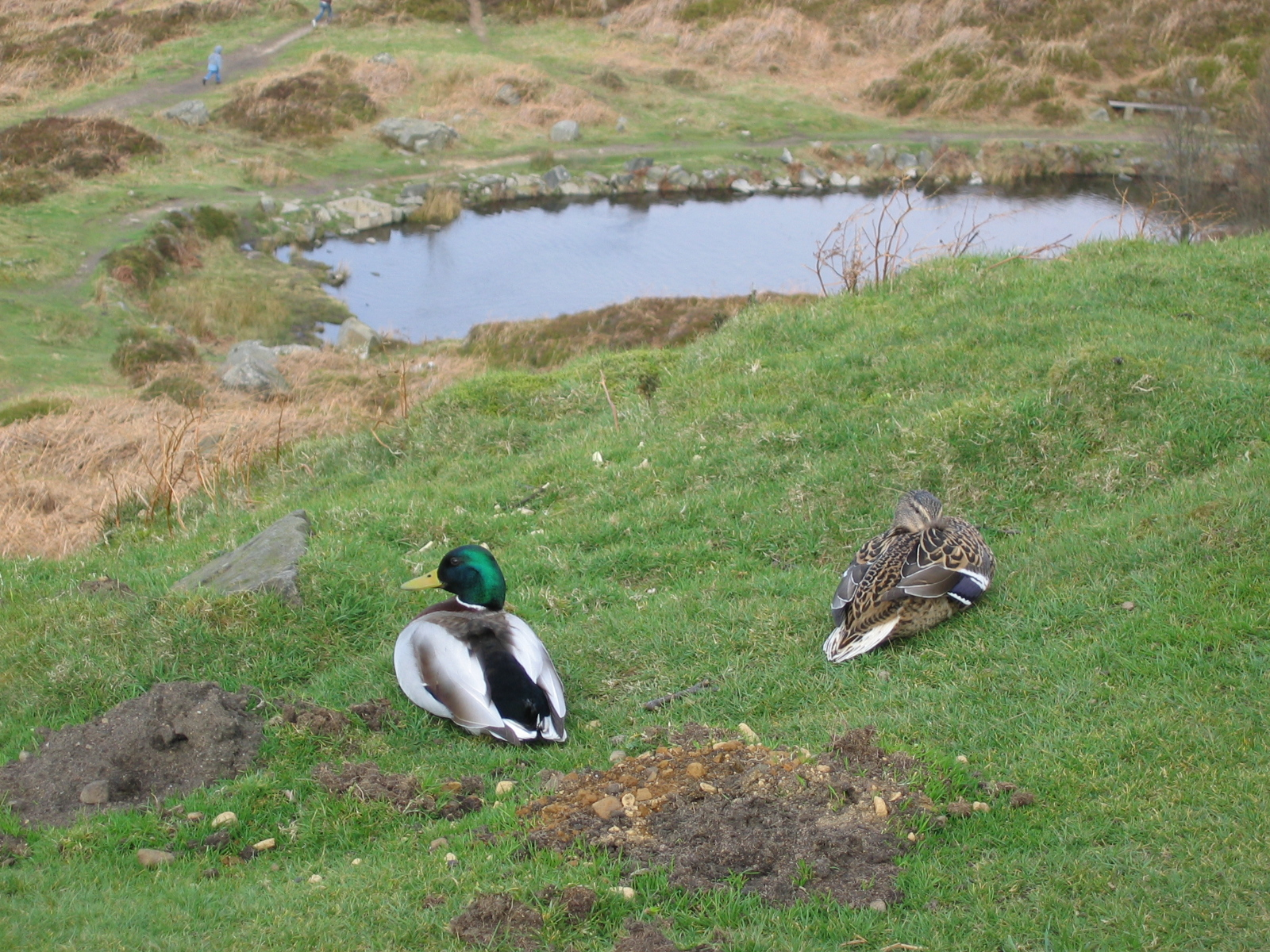
Ducks on Ilkley Moor, as in the song

"On Ilkla Moor Baht 'at" (also spelled "On Ilkla Mooar Baht 'at", Standard English: On Ilkley Moor without a hat) is a folk song from Yorkshire, England. It is sung in the Yorkshire dialect, and is considered the unofficial anthem of Yorkshire. It is sung to the hymn tune "Cranbrook", composed by Thomas Clark in 1805; while according to Andrew Gant, the words were composed by members of Halifax Church Choir "some 50 years after Clark wrote his melody", on an outing to Ilkley Moor near Ilkley, West Yorkshire. It is classified as numbers 2143 and 19808 in the Roud Folk Song Index.

== Theme ==
The song tells of a lover courting the object of his affections, Mary Jane, on Ilkley Moor without a hat (baht 'at). The singer chides the lover for his lack of headwear—for in the cold winds of Ilkley Moor this will mean his death from exposure. This will in turn result in his burial, the eating of his corpse by worms, the eating of the worms by ducks and finally the eating of the ducks by the singers.

In The Yorkshire Dictionary (Arnold Kellett, 2002) it was said the song (i.e., the lyrics) probably originated from the Halifax area, based on the dialect which is not common to all areas of Yorkshire.

The title is seen in various transcriptions of the dialect, but is most commonly On Ilkla Moor [or Mooar] baht 'at, i.e. "On Ilkley Moor without [wearing] thy (your) hat". Dr. Arnold Kellett reports the traditional belief that the song "came into being as a result of an incident that took place during a ramble and picnic on the moor. It is further generally believed that the ramblers were all on a chapel choir outing, from one of the towns in the industrial West Riding".

The first published version of the words appeared in 1916, when it was described as "a dialect song which, for at least two generations past, has been sung in all parts of the West Riding of Yorkshire". Arnold Kellett judged that the song "could well have originated in the early years of the second half of the [19th] century, and not as late as 1877".

== Tune ==
It is sung to the Methodist hymn tune "Cranbrook" (composed by Canterbury-based shoemaker Thomas Clark in 1805); this was published by him in 1805 in "A Sett of Psalm & Hymn Tunes with some Select Pieces and an Anthem", setting the words of Philip Doddridge's "Grace! 'Tis a Charming Sound". It was later used as a tune for "While Shepherds Watched Their Flocks By Night"), but the "Ilkla Moor" song became so popular that the origin of the music as a hymn tune has been almost forgotten in the United Kingdom.

On Ilkla Moor Baht 'at tune
Adapted from Cranbrook

It is still used for the traditional words "While Shepherds Watched" in some churches including Leeds Parish Church and St Aidan's Church in Manor Parish, Sheffield, but no longer widely recognised as a hymn or carol tune in the United Kingdom.

Cranbrook continues in use as a hymn tune in the United States, where it was not adopted as the tune of a popular secular song and is customarily used with the lyrics of Philip Doddridge's "Grace! 'Tis a Charming Sound".

== Collected versions ==
EFDSS director Douglas Kennedy collected a version in 1917 from a performer in Ilkley named Wilfred Hall, which was later printed in his son Peter Kennedy's book Folksongs of Britain & Ireland (1975).

Several audio recordings have been made of traditional versions. Ken Stubbs recorded Albert Gartside of Delph in the West Riding singing the song in 1964, whilst Fred Hamer recorded William Bleasdale singing a version in the village of Chipping in Lancashire some time in the 1950s or '60s. The American folklorist Helen Hartness Flanders recorded a version in her hometown of Springfield, Vermont and another in Naushon Isle, Massachusetts in the 1940s, suggesting that the song had made its way to North America with immigrants from Yorkshire.

A new musical rendition of "On Ilkla Moor Baht'at" was produced in 2013 by Grammy award winning artist Eliot Kennedy, featuring Lesley Garrett and Brian Blessed rapping the song. The project was the brainchild of Clair Challenor-Chadwick at Cause UK Public Relations, stemming from the idea that Yorkshire children did not know the song. The song also features community choir Rock Up and Sing and Fame Academy singer Alistair Griffin, the Grimethorpe Colliery Band and The X Factor singer and Yorkshire Regiment soldier Jonjo Kerr.

== Lyrics ==
The lyrics consist of a sequence of similar verses, each consisting of seven lines, with one mutable element: while the first, third and fourth lines are the same in each verse, they change with each following verse. In these lines, the words on the last two beats are repeated in the first and third lines, but not in the fourth line. The other lines do not change; all verses feature the same second, fifth, sixth and seventh lines, "On Ilkla Moor baht 'at".

Lyrics in Yorkshire dialect	Lyrics with spelling, but not grammar, standardised	Interpretation in Standard English
Wheear es-ta bin sin Ah saw thee? (Ah saw thee?)	Where has thou been since I saw thee? (I saw thee?)	Where have you been since I saw you? (I saw you?)
On Ilkla Mooar baht 'at	On Ilkley Moor but (Note: Meaning "without," a sense which in Standard English is restricted to phrases like "everything but the kitchen sink"; see https://en.wiktionary.org/wiki/baht#Etymology_2) hat	On Ilkley Moor without a hat
Wheear es-ta bin sin Ah saw thee? Wheear es-ta bin sin Ah saw thee?	Where has thou been since I saw thee? Where has thou been since I saw thee?	Where have you been since I saw you? Where have you been since I saw you?
On Ilkla Mooar baht 'at On Ilkla Mooar baht 'at On Ilkla Mooar baht 'at	On Ilkley Moor but hat On Ilkley Moor but hat On Ilkley Moor but hat	On Ilkley Moor without a hat On Ilkley Moor without a hat On Ilkley Moor without a hat
Tha's been a-cooartin' Mary Jane	Thou has been a-courting Mary Jane	You've been courting Mary Jane
Tha's bahn to ketch thi deeath o' cowd	Thou is bound to catch thy death of cold	You're bound to catch your death of cold
Then we s'll 'e to bury thee	Then we shall have to bury thee	Then we will have to bury you
Then t'wurrums'll come an' eyt thee up	Then the worms will come and eat thee up	Then the worms will come and eat you up
Then t'ducks'll come an' eyt up t'wurrums	Then the ducks will come and eat up the worms	Then the ducks will come and eat up the worms
Then we s'll come an' eyt up t'ducks	Then we shall come and eat up the ducks	Then we will come and eat up the ducks
Then we s'll all 'e etten thee	Then we shall all have eaten thee	Then we will all have eaten you
That's wheear we get us ooan back	That's where we get us own back	That's where we get our own back

The lyrics include many features of the Yorkshire dialect such as definite article reduction, H-dropping, and traditional second-person singular pronouns.

Many sources give the first line as "Wheear wor-ta bahn when Ah saw thee?" (Where were you going when I saw you), though "Wheear es-ta bin sin Ah saw thee" is the more common version nowadays.

Some singers add the responses "without tha trousers on" after the fourth line of each verse, and "where the ducks play football" after the seventh. Other variations include "where the nuns play rugby", "where the sheep fly backwards", "where the ducks fly backwards", "where the ducks wear trousers", "an' they've all got spots", and "where they've all got clogs on".

Also in some recitals, after the first two lines of "On Ilkla Moor baht 'at" it is followed by a "Where's that?" Another variant adds "Howzat?" after the first line and "Not out!" after the second. In Leeds the line immediately before the chorus is often ended with "And we all got wet". In the United States, "Then we will go and eat up the ducks" is often followed by a shouted "Up the Ducks!"

There are also alternative endings, where verse nine states: "There is a moral to this tale", and is followed by a chorus of "Don't go without your hat / Don't go without your hat / On Ilkey moor baht 'at" (which is sung commonly within West Yorkshire), or "Don't go a courtin' Mary Jane" (another variation known in the Scouting movement). Alternatively, verse nine is sung as "There is a moral to this tale", and verse ten as "When courtin' always wear a hat".

== Usage ==
=== Television ===
- Yorkshire Television – pre-programme ident 1968–1989 and 1996–2002
- Go With Noakes – 1970s BBC children's television programme
- Let's Pretend – 1980s ITV children's television programme. The tune is heard at the rising of the curtain.
- The Onedin Line – 1970s BBC series. The song is heard in multiple episodes.
- Clouds of Witness – TV adaptation of Dorothy Sayers' murder mystery
- Heartbeat – sung by character Alf Ventress in an episode entitled "In The Bleak Midwinter" (series 14, episode 13, first aired 26 December 2004)
- A Woman of Substance – 1980s BBC miniseries based on the book of the same name by Barbara Taylor Bradford – sung in Episode 1.3 by heroine Emma Harte (Jenny Seagrove) while she takes a bubble bath.
- All Creatures Great and Small – first season of TV series, and film
- A distorted version of the chorus is sung by Eccles (Spike Milligan) in an episode of The Goon Show
- United – in this 2011 BBC2 drama, Mark Jones (Thomas Howes) leads the other Busby Babes in a brief rendition of the song at a reception in Belgrade, before their ill-fated flight via Munich.
- The Great British Sewing Bee used the song in the first episode of its eighth series, to mark the programme's relocation from London to Leeds.

=== Commercial recordings ===
- Pete Seeger recorded live in concert at Mandel Hall in 1957 (2-CD set)
- British orchestra leader Alyn Ainsworth recorded the song for Parlophone Records in 1959.
- George Formby sang the second verse and the chorus in a medley of British folk songs.
- Chumbawamba – hidden track on Just Look At Me Now CD single; however, this is not a Chumbawamba performance but an anonymous rendering from a vinyl recording.
- Ted Heath recorded a big band swing arrangement of the song in 1945.
- Bill Oddie – 1970 a parody of the Joe Cocker arrangement of the Lennon–McCartney song "With a Little Help from My Friends"
- Ronnie Hilton recorded a version entitled "Elland Road Baht' at" as a tribute song for Leeds United AFC in 1964.
- Burl Ives recorded a version entitled "Ilkey Moor Bar'tat" with the Disneyland Childrens Chorus in 1964.
- Andrew Gant recorded While Shepherds Watched Their Flocks to the tune Cranford on the CD of 24 carols, performed by the chamber choir Vox Turturis.

=== Other usage ===
- In Dorothy L. Sayers' 1926 detective novel, Clouds of Witness, a Yorkshire farm labourer sings verses 2 and 5–7, while helping to rescue Lord Peter from a bog. Verse 2 is changed to "I been a-courtin' Mary Jane."
- The song was sung by soldiers during the Second World War.
- The Yorkshire Regiment – 4th Battalion's Quick March.
- Anita Rani introduced this song to a class of Chinese primary school children during an improvised English lesson on the BBC TV programme China on Four Wheels which was broadcast in 2012.
- A parody "On Exmoor Baht At" was widely sung at student and Young Liberal conferences in the 1970s, referring to the Thorpe affair. It remains in the Liberal Democrats Glee Club songbook to this day.
- A contemporary rendition was produced by Welcome to Yorkshire for Yorkshire Day 2013. It features a rap by Brian Blessed, as well as an operatic verse by soprano Lesley Garrett.
- Eric Fenby composed an overture in the style of Rossini, entitled Rossini on Ilkla Moor.
- The 2024 video game Thank Goodness You're Here! features multiple versions of the song.

== Published versions ==
- Rise Up Singing, Peter Blood and Annie Patterson, editors, 1988, page 74 ISBN 1-881322-13-0
