= Golden Age of the Piano =

The Golden Age of the Piano refers to a "golden age" extending from the 19th century to the beginning of the 20th century during which composing and performance on the piano achieved notable heights; or to the decades between roughly 1890 and 1920, in which pianos were manufactured and sold in great quantities, particularly in the United States.

Among the artists associated with the Golden Age of the Piano are Vladimir Horowitz, Glenn Gould, Wanda Landowska, Myra Hess, Arthur Rubinstein, Alexander Brailowsky, Ignacy Jan Paderewski, Josef Hofmann, Percy Grainger, Alfred Cortot, and Van Cliburn.

The term is also used to describe the decades in which the piano became ubiquitous in U.S. middle-class households and certain types of public spaces. "The end of the 19th century and the start of the 20th century has often been called 'The Golden Age of the Piano'", Randy Rowoldt wrote in the Small Home Gazette in 2018. "In an age before radio and television, and in a time when only the wealthy could afford a record player, the piano was a sign that a family had achieved middle-class respectability." Hundreds of piano manufacturers were founded between 1880 and 1910 to serve the burgeoning market. In 1892, for example, the country's total estimated production was 100,000 pianos, most made by manufacturers in and around New York City and Boston.

The arrival of the phonograph in the early 1900s and commercial radio in the 1920s exerted steadily growing pressure on piano makers. Total U.S. sales for the industry peaked around 300,000 in 1924, representing roughly $100 million in revenue ($1,830,000,000 today) and decreased steadily thereafter. In the final year of the Roaring Twenties, piano makers sold an estimated 115,000 instruments.
