= O for a Thousand Tongues to Sing =

Christian hymn written by Charles Wesley

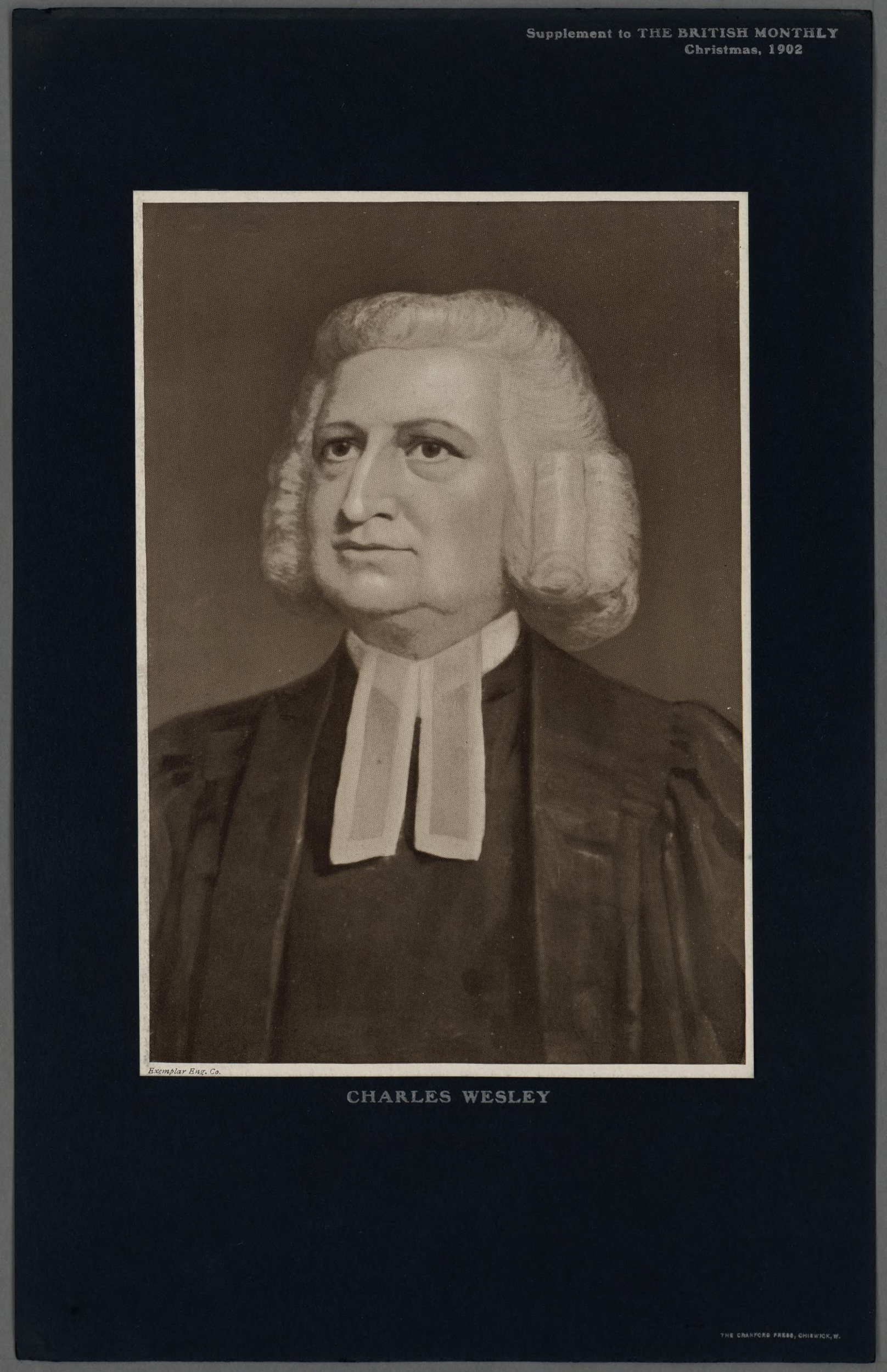
- Charles Wesley
- Genre: Hymn
- Written: 1739
- Text: Charles Wesley
- Based on: Psalm 35:28
- Meter: 8.6.8.6
- Melody: "Azmon" by Carl G. Glaser, arranged by Lowell Mason

"O for a Thousand Tongues to Sing" is a Christian hymn written by Charles Wesley. The hymn was placed first in John Wesley's A Collection of Hymns for the People Called Methodists published in 1780. It was the first hymn in every (Wesleyan) Methodist hymnal from that time until the publication of Hymns and Psalms in 1983.

== Background ==
Charles Wesley was suffering a bout of pleurisy in May 1738, while he and his brother were studying under the Moravian scholar Peter Boehler in London. At the time, Wesley was plagued by extreme doubts about his faith. Taken to bed with the sickness, on 21 May Wesley was attended by a group of Christians who offered him testimony and basic care, and he was deeply affected by this. He read from his Bible and found himself deeply affected by the words, and at peace with God. Shortly his strength began to return. He wrote of this experience in his journal, and counted it as a renewal of his faith; when his brother John had a similar experience on 24 May, the two men met and sang a hymn Charles had written in praise of his renewal.

One year from the experience, Wesley was taken with the urge to write another hymn, this one in commemoration of his renewal of faith. This hymn took the form of an 18-stanza poem, beginning with the opening lines "Glory to God, and praise, and love, / Be ever, ever given" and was published in 1740 and entitled "For the anniversary day of one's conversion". The seventh verse, which begins, "O for a thousand tongues to sing", and which now is invariably the first verse of a shorter hymn, recalls Boehler's words, "Had I a thousand tongues I would praise him [God] with them all".

== Original text ==
The original text is as follows:

1. Glory to God, and praise and love,
Be ever, ever given;
By saints below and saints above,
The Church in earth and heaven.

2. On this glad day the glorious Sun
Of righteousness arose,
On my benighted soul he shone,
And filled it with repose.

3. Sudden expired the legal strife;
'Twas then I ceased to grieve.
My second, real, living life,
I then began to live.

4. Then with my heart I first believed,
Believed with faith divine;
Power with the Holy Ghost received
To call the Saviour mine.

5. I felt my Lord's atoning blood
Close to my soul applied;
Me, me he loved – the Son of God
For me, for me he died!

6. I found and owned his promise true,
Ascertained of my part,
My pardon passed in heaven I know,
When written on my heart.

7. O For a thousand tongues to sing
My dear Redeemer's praise!
The glories of my God and King,
The triumphs of His grace!

8. My gracious Master and my God,
Assist me to proclaim,
To spread through all the world abroad
The honors of Thy name.

9. Jesus! the Name that charms our fears,
That bids our sorrows cease;
'Tis music in the sinner's ears,
'Tis life, and health, and peace.

10. He breaks the power of cancell'd sin,
He sets the prisoner free;
His blood can make the foulest clean,
His blood avail'd for me.

11. He speaks, – and, listening to his voice,
New life the dead receive;
The mournful, broken hearts rejoice;
The humble poor believe.

12. Hear him, ye deaf; his praise, ye dumb,
Your loosen'd tongues employ;
Ye blind, behold your Saviour come,
And leap, ye lame, for joy.

13. Look unto him, ye nations; own
Your God, ye fallen race;
Look, and be saved through faith alone,
Be justified by grace.

14. See all your sins on Jesus laid;
The Lamb of God was slain;
His soul was once an offering made
For every soul of man.

15. Harlots, and publicans, and thieves,
In holy triumph join!
Saved is the sinner that believes,
From crimes as great as mine.

16. Murderers, and all ye hellish crew,
Ye sons of lust and pride,
Believe the Savior died for you;
For me the Saviour died.

17. Awake from guilty nature's sleep,
And Christ shall give you light,
Cast all your sins into the deep,
And wash the AEthiop white.

18. With me, your chief, ye then shall know,
Shall feel your sins forgiven;
Anticipate your heaven below,
And own that love is heaven.

== Current versions ==
Today the hymn is often condensed into a smaller number of stanzas, typically between six and eight.

The 1989 editors of The United Methodist Hymnal omitted the verse containing the words "dumb" and "lame", but later reverted to the original version.

The authors of Companion to Hymns and Psalms (1988) note that the verse "He breaks the power of cancelled sin" is an apparent tautology, but speculated on Wesley's intention.

== Tunes ==
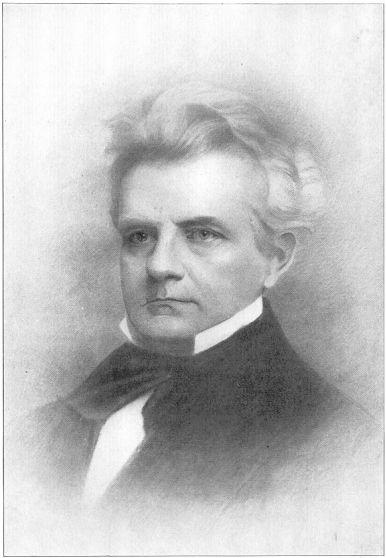
Lowell Mason

In the U.S., the hymn is commonly sung to Lowell Mason's 1839 arrangement of the hymn tune "Azmon", written by Carl G. Glaser in 1828. Mason's arrangement was written as a setting for this hymn. In Great Britain, Thomas Jarman's tune "Lyngham" is favoured, especially in larger congregations, although the tunes "Lydia" by Thomas Phillips and "Richmond" by Thomas Haweis are also used. Hymns Ancient and Modern has A. J. Eyre's "Selby" and J. H. Coombes's "Oxford New". In Australia, "Lyngham" is the favoured tune in churches, although "Azmon" and "Lydia" are also widely used. It is also occasionally sung to "Cranbrook".
