= Henry Mason (piano manufacturer) =

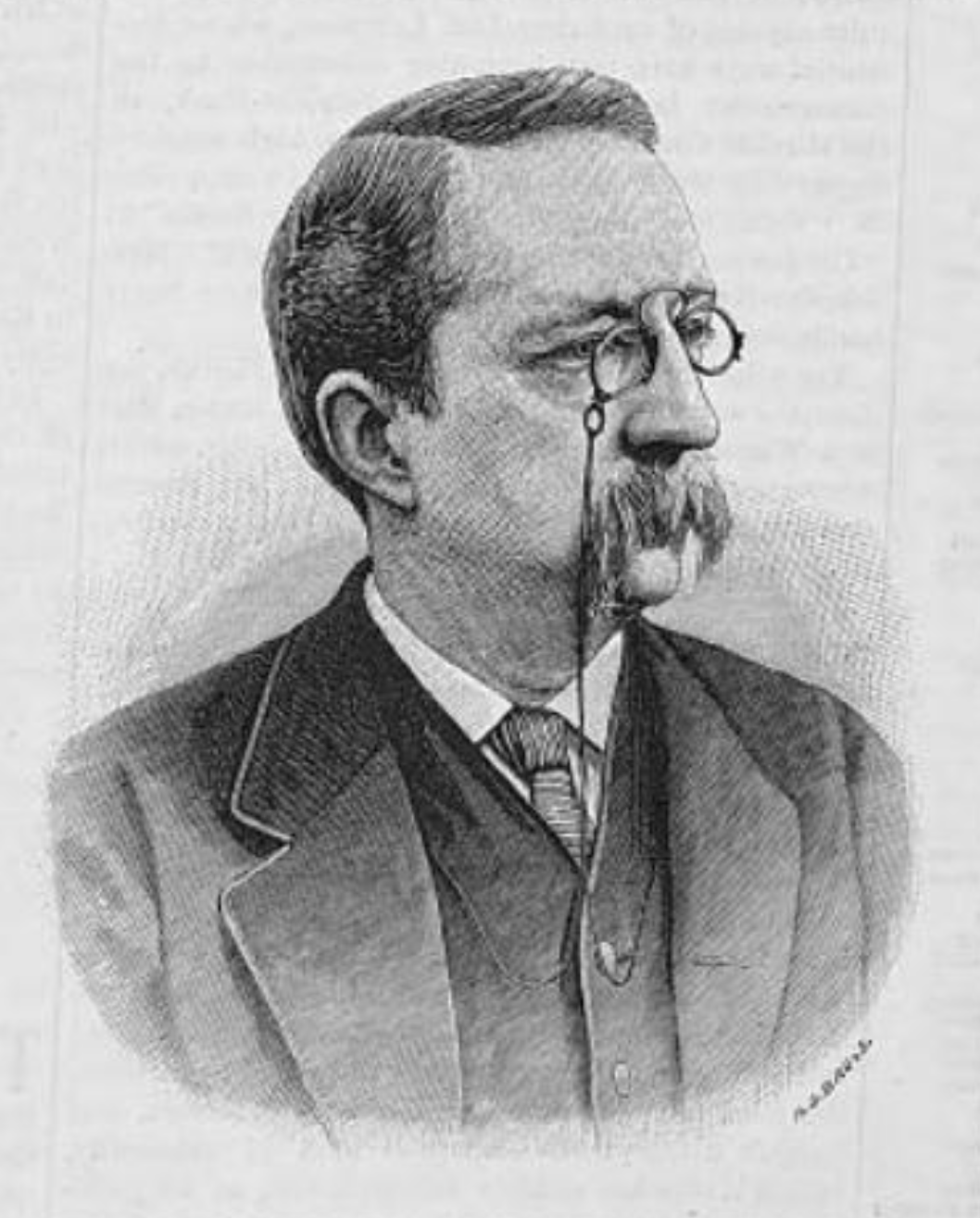
Henry Mason

Henry Mason (10 October 1831– 15 May 1890) was one of the co-founders of the American piano and organ manufacturer Mason and Hamlin.

== Life and career ==
Henry Mason was born in Boston, Massachusetts on 10 October 1831. Part of the Mason family of musicians, Henry was the youngest of four sons born to American church music composer Lowell Mason. His older brother was the composer William Mason whose son, Daniel Gregory Mason (1873–1953), was also a composer and a professor of music at Columbia University. Henry's uncle was the music editor, church musician, and music educator Timothy Battelle Mason.

Mason formed a partnership with Emmons Hamlin in 1854, establishing Mason & Hamlin as initially a business dedicated to manufacturing melodeon reed organs. They expanded into making cabinet organs in 1861, and then into making pianos. They had stores in New York, Boston, and Chicago. In 1857 he married Helen Augusta Palmer, and they had four sons during their marriage. Henry also worked as an organist in churches in Boston and New York City.

Henry Mason died on 15 May 1890 in Boston.
