= Sheffield Local Studies Library =

Public library in South Yorkshire, England

Sheffield Local Studies Library (located in Sheffield, South Yorkshire, England) collects and preserves printed material relating to Sheffield and the surrounding area, and makes it available for study and research. The collection of over 30,000 volumes includes books, pamphlets, journals and reports on all aspects of the city's history and development and the lives of its people. Information on present day Sheffield includes statistics and special files on current issues.

The Local Studies Library is a joint service with Sheffield Archives. They are part of the Sheffield Libraries Archives and Information Service delivered by Sheffield City Council. The Local Studies Library is situated on the first floor of Sheffield Central Library.

== Materials in the collections ==
=== Newspapers ===
Newspapers have been published in Sheffield for over 200 years. The main titles are:
• Sheffield Register 1787-1794
• Sheffield Iris 1794-1839
• Sheffield & Rotherham Independent 1819-1938
• Sheffield Daily Telegraph 1855-1986
• Star 1873-
• Sheffield Telegraph 1989-
• Green 'Un (sports) 1907-

=== Directories ===
Sheffield street and trade directories from 1774 to 1974, also telephone directories from 1941.

=== Census returns ===
Microfilm copies of 1841 -1881 for Sheffield and parts of South Yorkshire and North Derbyshire.

=== Electoral registers ===
Registers of electors from 1841 to the present.

=== Ordnance Survey maps ===
Past editions of 6 inch and 25 inch Ordnance Survey maps and some earlier non-Ordnance Survey maps. Before the Second World War maps were produced as a ‘County Series’ at a scale of 6 inches to 1 mile (1:10,560) and 1:2,500 (25 inches to 1 mile). As Sheffield lies on the boundary of Yorkshire and Derbyshire and has extended its boundaries at various times, this sometimes leads to confusion.

Yorkshire:
six-inch maps for this area were first published 1853-55.
1:2,500 maps were published in 1890 and revised in about 1905, 1923 and 1935.

Derbyshire:
six-inch and 1:2,500 maps were first published in 1876 and revised in about 1898, 1923 and 1938.

There are also town plans of Sheffield (these do not cover the whole of the present city):
1853 at 1:1056 scale
1890-93/1903 at 1:500 scale

The National Grid survey began in 1949 and continues to the present day. Maps are available at 1:10,000, 1:2,500 and 1:1,250 scales. Coverage at the largest scales is restricted to Sheffield.

=== Illustrations ===
Over 60,000 illustrations, mainly black and white photographs, of people, places and events in the Sheffield area.

=== Ephemera ===
Includes many miscellaneous printed items such as publicity leaflets, posters, trade literature, playbills and property sale plans.

=== Sound recordings ===
Recordings of local interest include all types of music and the spoken word. There is also a collection of oral history recordings in which Sheffield people talk about their lives.

=== Film and video ===
An important collection of archive film shows scenes of life in Sheffield.
