= Lowell Mason =

American composer; leading figure in American church music

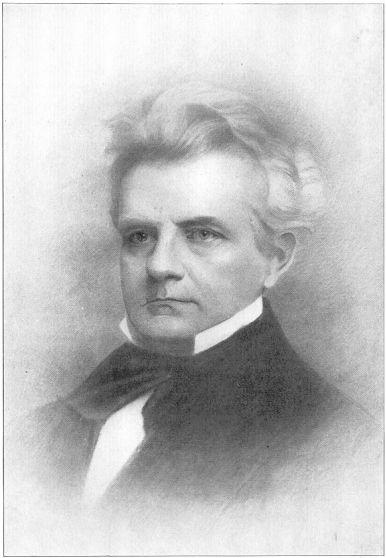
Portrait of Lowell Mason

Lowell Mason (January 8, 1792 – August 11, 1872) was an American music director and banker who was a leading figure in 19th-century American church music. Lowell composed over 1,600 hymn tunes, many of which are often sung today. His best-known work includes an arrangement of "Joy to the World" and the tune Bethany, which sets the hymn text Nearer, My God, to Thee. Mason also set music to Mary Had A Little Lamb. He is largely credited with introducing music into American public schools, and is considered the first important U.S. music educator. He has also been criticized for helping to largely eliminate the robust tradition of participatory sacred music that flourished in North America before his time.

== Life ==
Mason was born and grew up in Medfield, Massachusetts, where he became the music director of First Parish (now First Parish Unitarian Universalist) Church at age 17. His birthplace residence was saved from development in 2011. It was relocated to a town park on Green Street. The Lowell Mason House foundation is an effort to create a Lowell Mason museum and music education center. The foundation remains active as of 2021.

He spent the first part of his adulthood in Savannah, Georgia, where he worked first in a dry-goods store, then in a bank. He had very strong amateur musical interests, and studied music with the German teacher Frederick L. Abel, eventually starting to write his own music. He also became a leader in the music of the Independent Presbyterian Church, where he served as choir director and organist. Under his initiative, his church created the first Sunday school for black children in America at the now Historic First Bryan Baptist Church in Savannah, GA.

Following an earlier British model, Mason embarked on producing a hymnal whose tunes would be drawn from the work of European classical composers, such as Haydn, Mozart and Beethoven. Mason had great difficulty in finding a publisher for this work. Ultimately, it was published (1822) by the Handel and Haydn Society of Boston, which was one of the earliest American organizations devoted to classical music. Mason's hymnal was highly successful. He first had published it anonymously, as he felt that his main career was as a banker, and he hoped not to damage his career prospects.

A tune from Mason's Handbook for the Boston Academy

In 1827, Mason moved to Boston, where he continued his banking career for some time. Mason served as choirmaster and organist at Park Street Church from 1829 to 1831. He eventually became a music director for three churches, in a six-month rotation, including the Hanover Street church, whose pastor was the prominent abolitionist Lyman Beecher.

Mason became an important figure on the Boston musical scene: He served as president of the Handel and Haydn Society, taught music in the public schools, was co-founder of the Boston Academy of Music (1833). From 1838 to 1841 served as music superintendent for the Boston school system. In the 1830s, Mason set to music the nursery rhyme "Mary Had a Little Lamb". In 1845 political machinations in the Boston school committee led to the termination of his services.

In 1851, at the age of 59, Mason retired from Boston musical activity and moved to New York City, where his sons, Daniel and Lowell, Jr. had established a music business. On December 20, 1851, he set sail to Europe. During his tour of Europe in 1852, he developed a great interest and enthusiasm for congregational singing, especially that of German churches, such as the Nikolaikirche in Leipzig or the Kreuzkirche in Dresden.

Following his return to New York City, Mason accepted the position as music director in 1853 for the Fifth Avenue Presbyterian Church. It had just completed construction of a new church building on Nineteenth Street. He immediately disbanded its choir and orchestra, and installed an organ with his son, William, serving as organist. During his tenure, which lasted until 1860, he developed congregational singing to the point where the church was known as having the finest congregational singing in the city. In 1859 Mason, along with Edwards A. Parks and Austin Phelps, published the "Sabbath Hymn and Tune Book". This part of his career probably had the most enduring effects on American church music. Mason personally changed his view from imagining that church congregations were reluctant to sing to vigorously promoting congregational singing. He eliminated all professional musicians save the organist.

In 1855 the University of New York awarded Mason the degree of doctor of music, which was the first musical degree awarded by any American college.

In 1860 Mason retired to his estate in Orange, New Jersey, where he helped found Valley Congregational Church (renamed Highland Avenue Congregational Church in 1916). He was buried in Orange's Rosedale Cemetery.

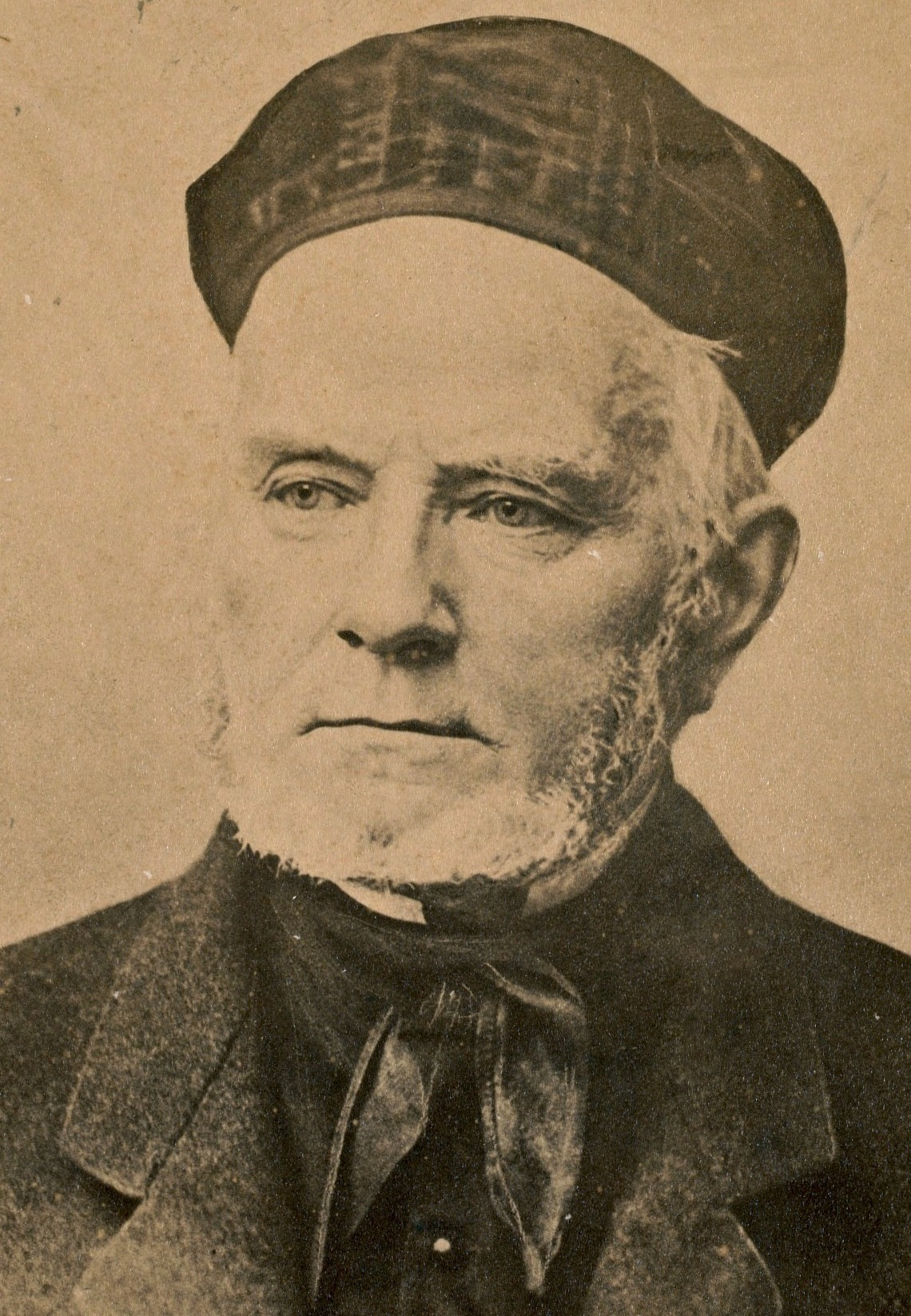
Lowell Mason

== Assessment ==
The editors of the Grove Dictionary of Music and Musicians criticize Mason for his focus on European classical music as a model for Americans. On the other hand, Mason is given credit for popularizing European classical music in a region where it was seldom performed. Since his day, the United States has been part of the global region in which this form of music is cultivated and appreciated.

The New Grove editors believe that Mason's introduction of European models for American hymnody choked off a flourishing participatory native tradition of church music, which had already produced outstanding compositions by such composers as William Billings. During the early 19th century, shape note music was used as part of evangelizing in the Second Great Awakening. Mason and his colleagues (notably his brother Timothy Mason) characterized this music as backwoods material, "unscientific", and unworthy of modern Americans. They taught their views through a new form of singing school, set up to replace the old singing schools dating from colonial times.

In comparison with the earlier forms of American sacred music, the music that Mason and his colleagues propagated would be considered by many musicians to be rhythmically more homogeneous and harmonically less forceful. By emphasizing the soprano line, it also made the other choral parts less interesting to sing. Lastly, the new music generally required the support of an organ, which was a Mason family business.

James Keene also addresses the shift in church music that Mason led, putting forth the idea that to some degree Mason's work cut off the people from their music:

As so often happens in America, the so-called arbiters of good taste looked across the Atlantic for their models and scorned that which was home-grown. And such was their influence, then as now, that an uncertain population, striving for cultural respectability, embraced the common practice of European art music. Those who studied in Europe or in the European model cultivated a social superiority. ... These arbiters of taste did not represent the mean of the population. Their influence left the many congregations without a music to which they could identify. An interest in church singing waned, giving way to the quartet choir. New England would not hear again the stimulating strains of the fuge-tune coming from all parts of the sanctuary.

The noted early music specialist Joel Cohen, whose ensemble has performed much early American music, offers the following assessment of Mason:

[Mason] spent his long career trying to "correct" the vital American folkhymn tradition and to replace it with something blander, and worse. He was rewarded for his largely successful efforts with fame, fortune, and a place in all standard music history books, while true geniuses like the anonymous harmonizer of Midnight Cry lie in unmarked graves.

The tradition that Mason largely succeeded in defeating retreated to the inland rural South, where it resisted efforts at conversion, surviving in the form of (for example) Sacred Harp music. This genre has grown in popularity as Americans (and even Europeans) in all regions rediscover pre-Lowell Mason American sacred music.

Nevertheless, his achievements as a hymnodist were celebrated long after his death. In 1942, his sesquicentennial was well celebrated. After an unveiling of a plaque at his grave, a commemorative service at the Orange church he founded was held. In addition to a variety of choral performances (of Mason's music), the service featured organ preludes based on Mason hymn tunes specially written for the occasion by T. Tertius Noble and by Mason's grandson Daniel Gregory Mason. Later that evening another concert featuring Mason's music was held at Union Theological Seminary in New York City.

== Relatives ==
Lowell Mason was the father of Henry Mason (the founder of the Mason and Hamlin firm), as well as composer William Mason. He was the grandfather of Daniel Gregory Mason, a music critic and composer and John B. Mason, a popular late nineteenth and early twentieth-century stage actor. Lowell's twin brother Johnson Mason was the grandfather of Louisville, Kentucky architect Mason Maury.
