= Piano Concerto in D minor =

Piano Concerto in D minor may refer to:

- Piano Concerto No. 20 (Mozart)
- Piano Concerto No. 2 (Mendelssohn)
- Piano Concerto No. 1 (Brahms)
- Piano Concerto No. 4 (Rubinstein)
- Piano Concerto No. 2 (MacDowell)
- Piano Concerto No. 3 (Rachmaninoff)
