= Woodland Sketches =

1896 piano suite by Edward MacDowell

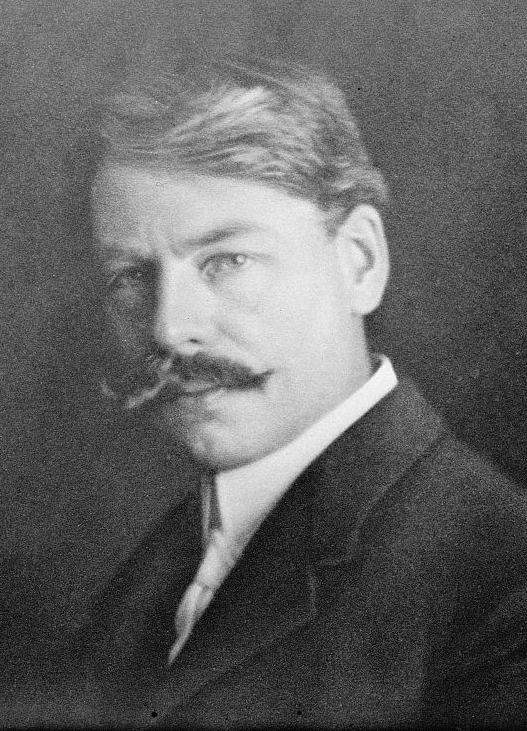
Edward MacDowell c. 1902

Woodland Sketches, Op. 51, is a suite of ten short piano pieces by the American composer Edward MacDowell. It was written during an 1896 stay at MacDowell's summer retreat in Peterborough, New Hampshire, where each piece was inspired by a different aspect of the surrounding nature and landscape. The suite was first published in 1896, with pieces such as "To a Wild Rose" (No. 1) and "To a Water-lily" (No. 6) becoming some of MacDowell's most popular works. While some pieces are notable for their use of impressionistic techniques in depicting the New England wilderness, others are based on elements from Native American and Southern music. Woodland Sketches is considered by critics and historians to contain some of MacDowell's most skillful and distinctive works.

== History ==
In 1896, MacDowell and his wife Marian fulfilled their dream of owning a country home with the purchase of a farm in Peterborough, New Hampshire. The farm served as MacDowell's summer retreat, where he composed Woodland Sketches. During the summer of 1896, MacDowell was inspired by the nature around his summer home and began composing brief melodies every morning, of which he later disposed. That past April, MacDowell explained how his composing occurred mostly in the summer as well as the importance of inspiration to his work:

I never attempt composition in the winter, but give all my time to routine work. In the summer I hire a house somewhere out in the country ... in fact live like a human being once more. Then when I have sufficiently worn off the effect of living in town I begin to think seriously of work. Some fine day I feel just in the mood for it and sit down to it. I almost never make any notes beforehand, but when I get an idea go to work and finish it up at once. It's of no use to say before I begin what I am going to do. I can only work as I feel, and sometimes accomplish nothing at all when I have felt that I was beautifully primed up...

At the suggestion of his wife, MacDowell recovered one of the thrown-away pieces and titled it "To a Wild Rose". It became the first in a set of ten pieces MacDowell composed that summer, which were first published as Woodland Sketches that fall by P. L. Jung in New York. The work was then assigned to the publisher Arthur P. Schmidt in 1899. The suite grew popular, and upon MacDowell's death in 1908, had reportedly sold over one hundred thousand copies. The appeal of MacDowell's pieces was due in part to their accessibility to amateur pianists during a time when many households owned a piano.

The music historian Richard Crawford wrote in 1996 that Woodland Sketches's source of inspiration in the American landscape may have been one way for MacDowell to "[claim] an identity as an American composer". Some time prior to composing the sketches, MacDowell told the American writer Hamlin Garland:

I am working toward a music which shall be American in the creative sense. Our music thus far has been a scholarly restatement, old world themes. In other words it is derived from Germany as all my earlier pieces were. (Note: This quote is originally found in Garland's 1930 book Roadside Meetings.)

== Pieces ==
The suite consists of ten pieces for piano:

1. "To a Wild Rose" — A major ("With simple tenderness")
2. "Will o' the Wisp" — F♯ minor ("Swift and light; fancifully")
3. "At an Old Trysting-place" — A♭ major ("Somewhat quaintly, not too sentimentally")
4. "In Autumn" — F♯ minor ("Buoyantly, almost exuberantly")
5. "From an Indian Lodge" — C minor ("Sternly, with great emphasis")
6. "To a Water-lily" — F♯ major ("In dreamy, awaying rhythm")
7. "From Uncle Remus" — F major ("With much humor, joyously")
8. "A Deserted Farm" — F♯ minor ("With deep feeling")
9. "By a Meadow Brook" — A♭ major ("Gracefully, merrily")
10. "Told at Sunset" — F minor ("With Pathos")

Most of the works in Woodland Sketches are in ternary form, consisting of simple melodies with chordal accompaniment. Many of the pieces' subjects are indicative of the nature and wildlife surrounding MacDowell's farm ("To a Wild Rose", "Will o' the Wisp", "To a Water-lily", "By a Meadow Brook") or are inspired by the MacDowells' frequent walks in the woods ("At an Old Trysting-place", "From an Indian Lodge", "A Deserted Farm"). According to the musicologist Douglas E. Bomberger, the pieces "are suggestive of extramusical ideas without telling a specific story". The musicologist Michael Broyles drew a connection between the suite and the short piano pieces of Norwegian composer Edvard Grieg, a Norse similarity that is also evident in MacDowell's piano sonatas.

=== 1. "To a Wild Rose" ===
The suite's first piece, "To a Wild Rose", is "MacDowell's best known single work" according to the musicologist H. Wiley Hitchcock, and it achieved what Bomberger described as "phenomenal popularity". MacDowell believed the work's popularity arose because the publisher spread its score generously across two pages. The piece begins with a spare melody, based on a simple one from the Brotherton Indians. The melody is played in short fragments and accompanied by chords and pedal points. The climax consists of a repeated dominant ninth chord, which can also be heard as a version of the Tristan chord. The piece concludes with a Scotch snap rhythm. Crawford opined that the piece's harmony "saves it from blandness".

=== 2. "Will o' the Wisp" ===
Bomberger considered "Will o' the Wisp" to be "the most virtuosic of the set", evoking MacDowell's love for "extreme speed". The music historian Neil Leonard cited "Will o' the Wisp" as an example of MacDowell's "concern for atmospheric effects" in depicting the titular lights with his impressionistic and economic style.

=== 3. "At an Old Trysting-place" ===
"At an Old Trysting-place" is the shortest piece in the suite. The music portrays the return to a place where one has once met their lover. It consists of a "long-breathed" melody, in contrast to the melodic fragments in "To a Wild Rose".

=== 4. "In Autumn" ===
"In Autumn" begins with a "brisk, staccato theme" followed by chromatic runs. The music shifts to a mysterious and questioning tone in the middle section before returning to the joyous opening theme.

=== 5. "From an Indian Lodge" ===
"From an Indian Lodge" opens with bare octaves, introducing a musical depiction of a pow wow in a wigwam. The piece ends on loud, orchestral-like chords. Just as "To a Wild Rose", "From an Indian Lodge" uses a melody from the Brotherton Indians. However, the piece also incorporates other Native American motifs; the first eight measures correspond to the "Songs of the Walla-Walla Indians, Nos. 1 and 2", while measures 9 to 25 correspond to the "Song of the Brotherton Indians". These melodies are compiled in the musicologist Theodore Baker's 1882 German dissertation Über die Musik der nordamerikanischen Wilden (English: On the Music of the North American Savages), which MacDowell received in 1891. (Note: "Songs of the Walla-Walla Indians" is numbered 42 and "Song of the Brotherton Indians" is numbered 37 in Baker's dissertation.)

=== 6. "To a Water-lily" ===
"To a Water-lily" has what the music historian John F. Porte described as "one of the most exquisite and perfect lyrics MacDowell ever composed for the pianoforte". The piece is mostly played on the black keys, with a meter change in the short middle section between two rounds of the opening passage scored on three staffs. MacDowell's inspiration for the piece came when his wife introduced him to the titular plant on one of their walks. To illustrate the floating flowers, MacDowell uses triple piano and pedal effects. Bomberger noted that this piece was an early example of impressionistic textures in American music, and it rivaled "To a Wild Rose" in popularity.

=== 7. "From Uncle Remus" ===
"From Uncle Remus" reflects MacDowell's nostalgia from reading Joel Chandler Harris' stories of the titular African American. In the piece, MacDowell attempts to imitate the banjo and elements of Southern culture despite never having directly experienced the American South. Nevertheless, Bomberger assessed the result as "charmingly nostalgic", and Porte found the piece "delightfully frank".

=== 8. "A Deserted Farm" ===
The music critic Lawrence Gilman described "A Deserted Farm" as the "quintessence of [MacDowell]'s style". The piece opens and ends with a grave theme in the minor key. This is contrasted by a middle section in the major key, marked "pianissimo as heard from afar" to indicate echoes from past barn dances. For this work, MacDowell was inspired by an abandoned farmstead where he and his wife previously had lunch.

=== 9. "By a Meadow Brook" ===
"By a Meadow Brook" is MacDowell's impression of the Nubanusit Brook, which flows past his Peterborough property. The piece suggests what MacDowell's wife described as "the busy, noisy, little stream rushing over a rocky bed" before closing on a diminuendo.

=== 10. "Told at Sunset" ===
The tenth and last piece, "Told at Sunset", recalls material from earlier pieces like "At an Old Trysting-place". The piece opens with a theme similar to "A Deserted Farm", which dies away before a new theme grows louder and then also dies away. A more expressive form of the theme from "A Deserted Farm" returns before reaching the piece's conclusion: silence followed by stern chords from the introduction to "From an Indian Lodge" that begin soft but finish in fortissimo. MacDowell used the Scotch snap rhythm extensively in "Told at Sunset", leading Bomberger to call the piece "The Apotheosis of the Scotch Snap".

== Reception ==
In his 1908 study on MacDowell's life, Lawrence Gilman considered some of the Woodland Sketches to be among "the choicest emanation of MacDowell's genius". He later wrote that in Woodland Sketches, MacDowell's speech "assumes for the first time some of its most engaging and distinctive characteristics" and that the pieces "have an inescapable fragrance, tenderness, and zest". Gilman recognized "At an Old Trysting-place", "From an Indian Lodge", "To a Water-lily", "A Deserted Farm", and "Told at Sunset" to be pieces of "a different calibre", remarkable for their "richness of emotion", "dramatic purpose", and "tactful reticence". He commented that the other five pieces "are slight in poetic substance, though executed with charm and humour".

In his 1991 treatise on American music, Nicholas E. Tawa deemed that "the finest of MacDowell's short characteristic pieces" are found in Woodland Sketches, as well as in three of MacDowell's subsequent suites: Sea Pieces, Op. 55 (1898); Fireside Tales, Op. 61 (1902); and New England Idylls, Op. 62 (1902). Michael Broyles wrote in 1998 that MacDowell's "sense of color, focus, and economy of means was extraordinary" in these suites.
