= To a Wild Rose =

1896 piano piece from Woodland Sketches by Edward MacDowell

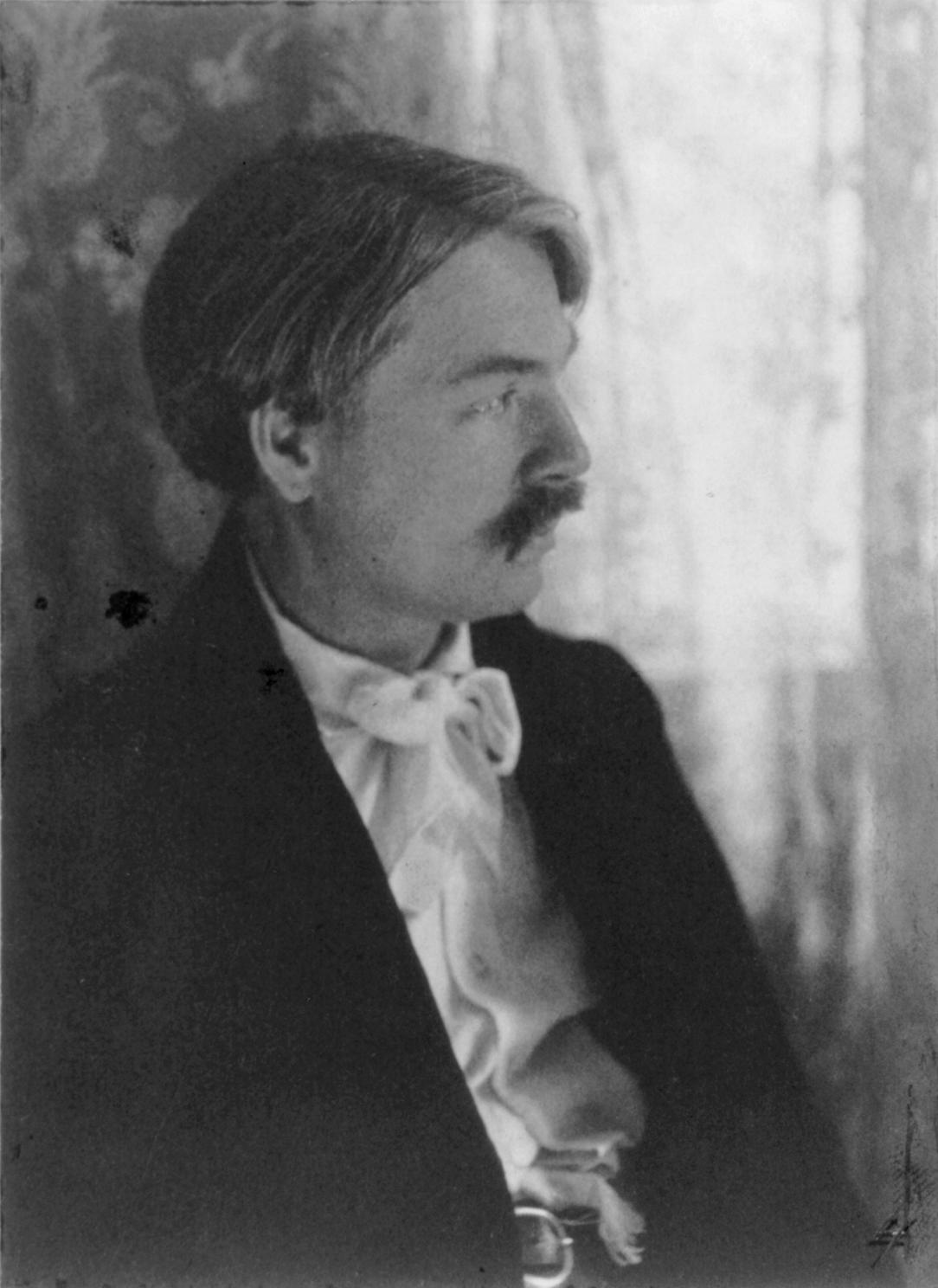
Edward Alexander MacDowell (1906)

"To a Wild Rose" is the first piece from Woodland Sketches, Op. 51, by the American composer Edward MacDowell. It was completed in 1896 and first published by Breitkopf & Härtel.

== Background ==
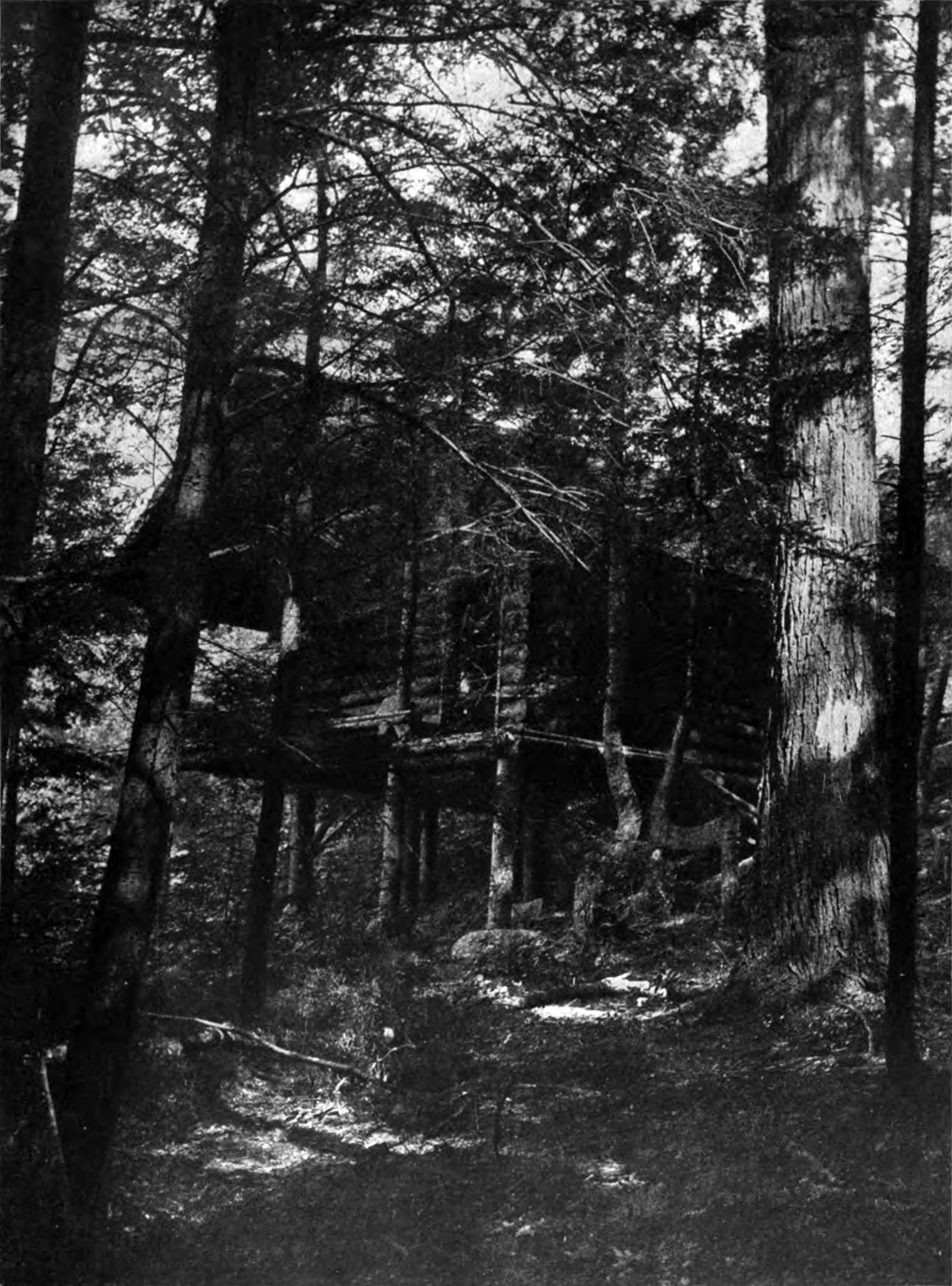
The MacDowells' log cabin in Peterborough, New Hampshire

"To a Wild Rose", one of the European-trained MacDowell's most well-known and loved pieces, is part of his Woodland Sketches for solo piano, finished in 1896. The composer incorporated certain Native American themes into it. Alan Howard Levy, the critic and biographer, wrote:

Marian [Edward's wife] recalled how her husband would regularly write a few measures during breakfast – "like exercise" – before going off to the cabin. Normally, MacDowell discarded such fragments, and this particular morning he crumpled the paper and tossed it at the fireplace. He happened to miss the target, however, and rather than summarily throwing it away, Marian later picked up the paper, uncrumpled it, and looked it over. She played it at the piano and decided to keep it. When Edward later returned from the cabin she showed it to him and said: "This is a charming little melody." Edward looked at it anew and agreed, "It is not bad – very simple. It makes me think of wild roses near the cabin."

However, Marian MacDowell's version of the story is slightly different. She wrote that the fragment made her husband think of their "log cabin" – as opposed to "cabin" – which was not built until 1898, two years after the Sketches were published.

Solo piano

The composer's love for roses was so great that he was buried under a boulder, around which many rose plants grew.

== Performance ==
Numerous arrangements of the piece have been made. Though the original was for solo piano, it has been arranged for two sopranos, alto and piano to a text by Hermann Hagedorn. Nat King Cole played his own version of the song. Levy said that the piece is best played by children, as they would not embellish it heavily but perform it quite simply. Jazz saxophonist Sonny Rollins also incorporated the song into his live repertoire, and it was recorded by George Shearing with his quintet.

== In popular culture ==
It is a recurring theme in the 1941 movie Penny Serenade. The pop song "Am I Ready", written by Roy C. Bennett and Sid Tepper and recorded by Elvis Presley in 1966 for the soundtrack of the film Spinout, is based on the melody of this piece.
