= Edith Noyes Greene =

American composer, music educator, clubwoman and pianist (1875–1956)

Edith Noyes Porter
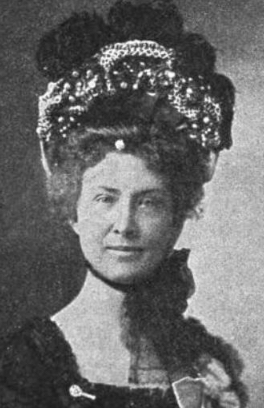
- Edith Noyes Porter, from a 1901 publication
- Born: Edith Rowena Noyes; March 26, 1875; Cambridge, Massachusetts, US
- Died: June 25, 1956
- Other names: Edith Noyes Porter (1898–1908)
- Occupations: Composer, music educator, pianist

Edith Rowena Noyes Greene (March 26, 1875 – June 25, 1956) was an American composer, music educator, clubwoman, and pianist, based in Boston, Massachusetts.

== Early life ==
Edith Rowena Noyes was born in Cambridge, Massachusetts, the daughter of Charles Claudius Noyes and Jeanette Mabel Pease Noyes. Her mother was better known as Boston contralto singer Jeanette Noyes Rice. Edith Noyes studied piano with Edward MacDowell and composition with George Whitefield Chadwick.

== Career ==
Edith Noyes began publishing her works while she was a teenager. She composed songs, hymns, instrumental works for piano and violin, an operetta, Last Summer, and an opera, Osseo. Last Summer was produced in 1900 as a benefit for the Quincy Hospital. She also taught piano in Boston.

In 1895, Noyes started the first MacDowell Club, a music performance and appreciation club in Boston, named as a tribute to her piano teacher. She was founder (in 1911) and president of the city's Music Lovers' Club, and was a member of the Chromatic Musical Club.

Edith Noyes Greene promoted the work of disabled "cowboy" painter Floyd Niles Walser. In 1929, she hosted a weekly radio show highlighting Boston musicians and events. In 1933, she directed a concert benefiting the Peabody Home for Crippled Children.

== Personal life ==
Edith Noyes married educator Henry Whitcomb Porter in 1898. They had a son, John Whitcomb Porter, and divorced in 1908. She married again, to fellow pianist Roy Goddard Greene, in 1909. On the Greenes' wedding trip to Europe in 1909, they stayed with Ignacy Jan Paderewski in Switzerland and she studied with conductor Emil Paur. Roy Greene died in 1946, and Edith Noyes Greene was listed in his death notice as his survivor.

Her house is included in historical tours of Framingham.
