= Piano Concerto No. 2 (MacDowell) =

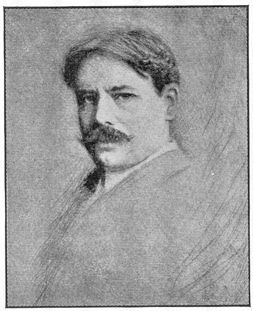
Portrait of Edward MacDowell

The Piano Concerto No. 2 in D minor, Op. 23 by Edward MacDowell was completed in late 1885. Although some obvious similarities with Edvard Grieg's, Camille Saint-Saëns's and Franz Liszt's concertos have often been stated, MacDowell’s composition proves to be quite original, at least compared to his First Concerto. It was the first major piano concerto written by an American. It was also the only large-scale composition by MacDowell to remain in standard repertoire.

== History ==
Macdowell's First Concerto was written and performed in 1882, when he was only 22. It was published in 1884. The composer soon began working on his Second. Finished in Wiesbaden in late 1885, for some years it remained unperformed. In 1888 MacDowell returned to America. On March 5, 1889 he performed the new concerto in Chickering Hall (New York City) with New York Philharmonic under Theodore Thomas. The program of this concert also included the American premiere of Tchaikovsky's Symphony No. 5. Next year (1890) Breitkopf & Härtel published the orchestral score and an arrangement for 2 pianos (prepared by MacDowell himself). It was dedicated to Teresa Carreño, a famous pianist, who used to be one of MacDowell's earliest piano teachers.

The first recording of this concerto was made by Jesús Maria Sanromá in 1934 with Boston Pops Orchestra under Arthur Fiedler. Van Cliburn chose this concerto for his professional debut when he was eighteen.

== Instrumentation ==
The work is scored for solo piano, 2 flutes, 2 oboes, 2 clarinets (B♭), 2 bassoons, 4 horns (F), 2 trumpets (F), 3 trombones, timpani and strings.

== Structure ==
The concerto consists of three traditional movements, all in sonata form. However the first movement is largely slow (instead of being fast) and the second is a lively scherzo (instead of a slow one). Principal theme of the first movement (motto) reappears in the third. A typical performance lasts 25–28 minutes, half of which takes the first movement.

1. Larghetto calmato – Poco più mosso, e con passione (D minor)
2. Presto giocoso (B♭ major)
3. Largo – Molto allegro (D major)

The first movement opens with a lilting, almost Wagnerian, introduction played by orchestra (Larghetto calmato). A stentorian cadenza follows, and after a short reprise of the introduction the proper sonata form begins (Poco più mosso, e con passione). The theme of the cadenza is incorporated in the first subject, while the introductory one is later transformed into the second (in F major). The development section is interrupted by the reappearing of the initial cadenza, much more elaborated. After this music proceeds to the recapitulation. Soon states orchestral tutti the main theme, after which the cadenza is heard for the last time. It ends in a gloomy mood. The orchestra repeats the principal theme in D minor, sounding like a funeral march. Surprisingly the soloist soon changes the key to D major, which becomes the key of the second subject. The movement ends peacefully with a brief coda.

The tone of the scherzo has much in common with the final of MacDowell's First Concerto. According to the composer, it was inspired by Ellen Terry's portrayal of Beatrice in Much Ado About Nothing. The first subject here is a perpetual motion theme, it sounds somewhat folk-like when played for the second time. Then comes a more lyrical second theme in E♭ minor, which after a shortened version of the first subject is repeated in B♭ minor. A new, full reprise of the scherzo theme is heard and leads to a coda.

The finale is the most complicated movement. It begins again with a dark introduction (Largo) recalling the main theme of the first movement. Even the piano cadenza manage to reappear. This section is in D minor, but the finale itself (in an unusual ¾ time) turns out to be in D major (Molto allegro). Its main theme gives place soon to a second idea (Poco più mosso, in F major), rhythmically pert and skittish. Nor statement of this requires long time, and a new valse-like theme (in B minor) is presented in the brass, which is derived from the principle theme of the first movement. After some 30 bars it ends abruptly with piano stating the cadenza theme (Poco più lento). The recapitulation of the first theme entrancingly imitates musical snuff-box; it is slightly expanded and lacks the final section. Different reminiscences upon the valse theme follow (mostly in D major, showing it to be the real second subject of this movement) before the skittish melody returns (Poco più mosso, again in F major). It is followed by the final section of the first theme and the coda providing a most brilliant conclusion.

== Recordings ==
- Jesús Maria Sanromá (piano) with Boston Pops Orchestra, Arthur Fiedler (1934)
- Alexander Jenner (piano) with Vienna State Opera Orchestra, Henry Swoboda - (LP, 1952)
- Jesús Maria Sanromá (piano) with Eastman-Rochester Symphony Orchestra, Howard Hanson - (LP, 1952/54?) - a digitized version available from Naxos Records 9.80570
- Vivian Rivkin (piano) with Vienna State Opera Orchestra, Dean Dixon - (LP, 1954/58?) - reissued on MCA Records MCAD2-9842, disc 1 (1992)
- Van Cliburn (piano) with Chicago Symphony Orchestra, Walter Hendl (1960) - reissued on RCA GD60420
- Eugene List (piano) with Vienna State Opera Orchestra, Carlos Chávez - (LP, 1962) His Master's Voice CLP 1710 - reissued on Millennium Classics MCD80086
- Earl Wild (piano) with RCA Victor Symphony Orchestra, Massimo Freccia - (LP) - reissued on Chesky CD76A (1992)
- Marjorie Mitchell (piano) with American Arts Orchestra, William Strickland - (LP, 1968) Vanguard Records - reissued on Vanguard
- Roberto Szidon (piano) with London Philharmonic Orchestra, Edward Downes - (LP, 1970) Deutsche Grammophon 2530 055
- Eugene List (piano) with Westphalian Symphony Orchestra (Recklinghausen) Siegfried Landau - (LP, 1973)
- Donna Amato (piano) with London Philharmonic Orchestra, Paul Freeman (1985) - Archduke Records (LARC1 and MARC1), reissued on Olympia Records OCD 353, reissued on ALTO ALC1012
- Claudette Sorel (piano) with New York Philharmonic, Franco Autori - (CD, 1992?) - reissued on Emsco Productions 8156 (1998)
- Thomas Tirino (piano) with Bulgarian Radio Symphony Orchestra, Vassili Kazandjiev - Centaur CRC 2149 (1992)
- André Watts (piano) with Dallas Symphony Orchestra, Andrew Litton - Telarc CD-80429
- Norman Krieger (piano) with Roanoke Symphony Orchestra, David Wiley (1998)
- Stephen Prutsman (piano) with National Symphony Orchestra of Ireland, Arthur Fagen (1999) - Naxos Records 8.559049
- Seta Tanyel (piano) with BBC Scottish Symphony Orchestra, Martyn Brabbins (2000) - Hyperion Records CDA67165 (Romantic Piano Concerto Vol.25)
- Derek Han (piano) with Chicago Sinfonietta, Paul Freeman - (2002)
- Frederick Moyer (piano) with Plovdiv Philharmonic Orchestra, Nayden Todorov - JRI Recordings J122 (2007)
- Paul Van Nees (piano) with Plovdiv Philharmonic Orchestra, Nayden Todorov - Music Minus One MMO3090
