= List of compositions by Teresa Carreño =

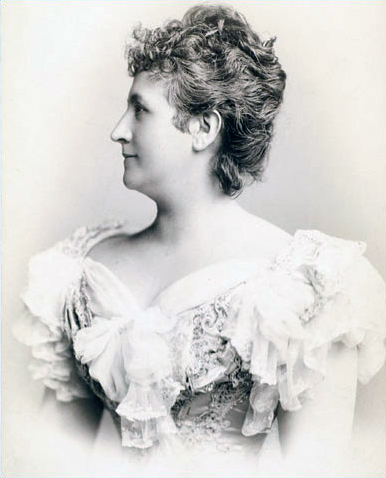
Teresa Carreño, c. 1903

This list of compositions by Teresa Carreño provides the earliest known publication date and name of publisher. If a work is unpublished or no published work available, the abbreviation "MS" is used. Carreño composed approximately seventy-five compositions. Most of her compositions were composed between 1860 and 1875, and then sporadically during 1880s and 1890s. Sixty-eight compositions are for solo piano, two known works exist for voice and piano, two works for chorus, and three works for instrumental or orchestral ensemble.

== Works for Piano with opus numbers ==
- Op. 1 Gottschalk Waltz (Boston, 1863)
- Op. 2 Caprice-Polka, Fantasie-Caprice (Paris, c. 1866)
- Op. 3 Reverie-Impromptu, (MS, c. 1866)
- Op. 4 Caprice Étude no 1, (MS, n.d.)
- Op. 5 Une Larme. Impromptu (MS, 1863)
- Op. 6 Caprice-Étude no 2, (MS, n.d.)
- Op. 7 Caprice-Étude no 3, (MS, n.d.)
- Op. 8 Marche Triomphale (Boston, 1873)
- Op. 9 Le corbeille de fleurs. Valse (Paris, c. 1867)
- Op. 10 Souvenir de mon pays. Nocturne, (MS, n.d.)
- Op. 11 Marche Funèbre, (MS, n.d.)
- Op. 12 Prière, (MS, n.d.)
- Op. 13 Polka de concert (Paris, c. 1867)
- Op. 14 Reminiscences de Norma. Fantaisie (Paris, c.1867)
- Op. 15 Ballade (Paris, c.1867)
- Op. 16 Souvenirs de l'Angleterre. Air anglais (c. 1866)
- Op. 17 Plaìntes au bord d'une tombe. Six melodies, no. 1. Plainte! 1re Élégie (Paris, c.1869)
- Op. 18 Plaìntes au bord d'une tombe. Six melodies, no. 2. Partie! 2ème Élégie (Paris, c.1869)
- [Op. 19] Plaìntes au bord d'une tombe. Six melodies, no. 3 (Boston, c. 1873)
- Op. 20 Plaìntes au bord d'une tombe. Six melodies, no. 4. 4ème Élégie, (MS, n.d.)
- Op. 21 Plaìntes au bord d'une tombe. Six melodies, no. 5. 5ème Élégie, (MS, n.d.)
- Op. 22 Plaìntes au bord d'une tombe. Six melodies, no. 6. 6ème Élégie, (MS, n.d.)
- Op. 23 Mazurka. Caprice de concert, (MS, n.d.)
- Op. 24 Fantasie sur l'Africaine de Meyerbeer. Paris: Brandus et S. Dufour (Paris, c. 1868)
- Op. 25 Le printemps. 3ème Valse de Salon (Paris, 1868)
- Op. 26 Un bal en rȇve. Fantasie-Caprice (Paris, c. 1869)
- Op. 27 Une revue à Prague. Caprice de concert (MS) (Paris, c. 1869)
- Op. 28 Un rêve en mer. Étude-Méditation (MS) (Paris, c. 1868)
- Op. 29 Le ruisseau. 1re Étude de salon (Paris, c. 1869)
- Op. 30 Mazurka de salon (Paris, c. 1869)
- Op. 31 Scherzo-Caprice (Paris, c. 1868)
- Op. 33 Esquisses italiennes. No. 1 "Venise," Réverie-Barcarolle (Paris, c. 1870)
- Op. 34 Esquisses italiennes. No. 2 "Florence." Cantilène (Paris, c. 1870)
- Op. 34 Intermezzo-Scherzoso (New York, 1879)
- Op. 35 Le Sommeil de L'Énfant. Berceuse (Paris, c. 1872)
- Op. 35 Polonaise (New York, 1873)
- Op. 36 Scherzino (London, c. 1871)
- Op. 38 Highland. Souvenir d'Écosse. Caprice (Paris, 1872)
- Op. 38 Vals Gayo. (MS, 1910), (Cincinnati, 1919)
- Op. 39 La fausse note. Fantasie-Valse (Paris, 1872)

== Works for Piano without opus numbers ==
- No. 1 Valse (MS, 1860)
- No. 2 Valse (MS, 1860)
- No. 3 Mazurka (MS, 1860)
- No. 4 Danza (MS, 1860)
- No. 5 Valse (MS, 1860)
- No. 6 Valse (MS, 1860)
- No. 7 Valse (MS, 1860)
- No. 8 Valse (MS, 1860)
- No. 9 Polka (MS, 1861)
- No. 10 Polka (MS, 1861)
- No. 11 Danza (MS, 1861)
- No. 12 Valse (MS, 1861)
- No. 13 Danze (MS, 1861)
- No. 14 Valse (MS, 1861)
- No. 15 Valse (MS, 1861)
- Capricho no. 1 (MS, 1861)
- Capricho no. 2 (MS, 1861)
- Capricho no. 3 (MS, 1861)
- Saludo a Cuba (c. 1863)
- 4éme Valse (MS, 1868)
- Danse de gnome (Boston, 1875)
- Sailing in the Twilight (Boston, 1875)
- Kleiner Walzer (Mi Teresita) (MS) (Sydney, c. 1891)
- Étude-mazurka (MS, n.d.)
- La Petite Boiteuse. Caprice (MS, n.d.)
- Preludio (MS, n.d.)
- Valse Mélancholique (MS, n.d.)

== Works for Voice and Piano ==
- Feuillet d'Album. Lamartine. "Le livre de la vie est le libre supreme." (MS, n.d.)
- Movimento de Barcarole. "Voga, voga, la pallida luna gia rischiara." (MS, n.d.)

== Works for Chorus ==
- Hymno [Himno] a Bolivar (MS, c. 1883)
- Himno al ilustre Americano (c. 1886)

== Instrumental or Orchestral Works ==
- Romance pour Violon avec accompagnement de Piano (MS, n.d.)
- Serenade for String Orchestra (MS, 1895)
- String Quartet, B minor (Allegro, Andante, Scherzo: Allegro ma non troppo, Allegro risoluto) (MS, c. 1895), (Leipzig, 1896)

== Missing or Lost Works ==
- Op. 40 Stacatto-Capriccieto (New York: Schuberth, n.d.)
