= Frances Tarbox =

American composer and pianist

Frances Tarbox (February 4, 1874 – October 23, 1959) was an American composer and pianist who wrote one opera and several songs. Her name is sometimes seen as Frances Tarbos.

Tarbox was born in St. Paul, Minnesota to Emma and Jasper Billings Tarbox. She studied music in Paris and with Edward MacDowell. She lived in New York City from at least 1910 until her death. Baritone Louis Graveure performed her best-known song "The Joy of a Rose" frequently in his recitals.

Tarbox's music was published by Carl Fischer. In addition to an opera (title unknown), her compositions included:

== Piano ==
- Valse Pavlova

== Vocal ==
- "America Stand Forth" (text by Michel Justin; pseud of Julie C. Pruyn)
- "Joy of a Rose"(text by A. L. Gruber)
- "Relief from the New Deal" (text by Michel Justin; pseud of Julie C. Pruyn)
- "What Them Fellows Does is Art"
- "We've Found At Last a Candidate of Presidential Timber" (text by Michel Justin; pseud of Julie C. Pruyn)
