= Andreina Gómez =

Venezuelan filmmaker and ethnologist

- Born: April 18, 1981 (age 45)
- Occupations: Ethnologist, film director, producer, and writer
- Notable work: Macanao: Footprints in Time, Water Drums, an Ancestral Encounter

Andreina Gómez (born April 18, 1981) is a Venezuelan filmmaker, ethnologist, and founder of Salinas Producciones C.A. Her documentaries feature cultural and ethnological themes discovered in her research, with her major work focusing on music. She is known for her work as a producer for Water Drums, an Ancestral Encounter which explored how African musical influences appear in Venezuelan music. As of 2015 she was in production for Teresita y El Piano, a documentary of the life of Teresa Carreño. Her productions have appeared in several international film festivals and academic institutions. In addition she works to promote cultural outreach through her films, both within Venezuela and internationally.

== Early life and education ==
Andreina Gómez was born in Caracas, Venezuela. She obtained her bachelor's degree in political sciences at the University of the Andes (Venezuela) in 2005 and master's in ethnology at the same institution in 2010. She has also studied screen and script writing workshops from the GUIONARTE Creativity School in Argentina in 2013 and Escuela Internacional de Cine y Televisión San Antonio de los Baños, Cuba from 2011 to 2012, pitching from Centro Nacional Autónomo de Cinematografía in 2010, and animation at Casa América in 2009.

== Career ==
Gómez has built a diverse and impactful career as a producer, working on two feature films and five television series, resulting in a total of 37 documentaries. Her work often explores international themes, with filming taking place in various countries including Venezuela, Colombia, Cuba, and Cameroon. Funding for her projects comes from diverse sources, notably the Centro Nacional Autónomo de Cinematografía (CNAC) at both national and international levels. Her productions have gained recognition at prestigious international film festivals such as the Berlin International Film Festival in Germany, Le Marché du Film - Cannes Film Festival in France, BAFICI Film Market in Argentina, Guadalajara International Film Festival Market in Mexico, Documentary Markets DocMontevideo in Uruguay, and Ventana Sur in Argentina.

Gómez's first feature film, Water Drums, an Ancestral Encounter (2008), directed by Clarissa Duque, saw her taking on multiple roles as a producer, including executive, general, field, and ethnological levels. She led efforts to organize filming in Venezuela and Cameroon, with CNAC, Venezuela, providing major production support. At its debut in Mali, the Ambassador of Venezuela to Mali, Jhony Balza Arismendi, remarked that the movie not only reflected the African influence on Venezuelan art and culture but also represented how these cultural ties survived colonial attempts to break them down.

Her second feature film, Ajíla, directed by Miguel Guédez, saw her again in the role of producer at the executive, general, and field levels. Filmed in the Venezuelan Llanos in 2010, Ajíla was also funded by CNAC, Venezuela, highlighting the continued support of national institutions for Gómez's work.

Her most recent project, Macanao: Footprints in Time, is a four-part documentary miniseries funded by the Venezuelan Ministry for Higher Education, Science, and Technology's ConCienciaTV. In this project, Gómez was involved in researching authorship, contributing to the script, and directing. The series first aired in March 2016 and aimed to shed light on the historical and genetic realities of the Margarita Island.

As of 2015, Gómez began working on her debut feature film as a director, Teresita y El Piano. This documentary explores the life and music of Venezuelan pianist and composer, Teresa Carreño, tracing her journey through Venezuela, Cuba, the United States, France, the United Kingdom, and Germany. For this project, Gómez received funding from Ibero-American Cinema IBERMEDIA and the documentary was selected for major development clinics at the Talent Campus, 2012, Berlinale (Berlinale Talents), and the Sundance Institute in 2014. Her production company, Salinas Producciones, organized a concert showcasing Teresa Carreño's music at the Teresa Carreño Theatre in Caracas in July 2016.

In addition to her film work, Gómez serves as the coordinator of projects and audiovisual campaigns for Fundation Humanit'as, a Venezuelan-German International NGO sponsored by the United Nations. She also founded her own production company, Salinas Producciones C.A., located in Nueva Esparta State.

== Filmography ==
- Water Drums, an Ancestral Encounter, Feature film, 2008
- Saber Rural, Television series, 2009
- Ajila, Feature film, 2010
- Luisa Cáceres: La heróina de la Resistencia, Animation for television, 2012
- Paraguachoa, Resiste II Parte, Television series, 2013–2014
- Guárama, Television Series, 2014
- Macanao, Footsteps in Time, Television series, 2015
