= Indian Suite =

Orchestral suite by Edward MacDowell

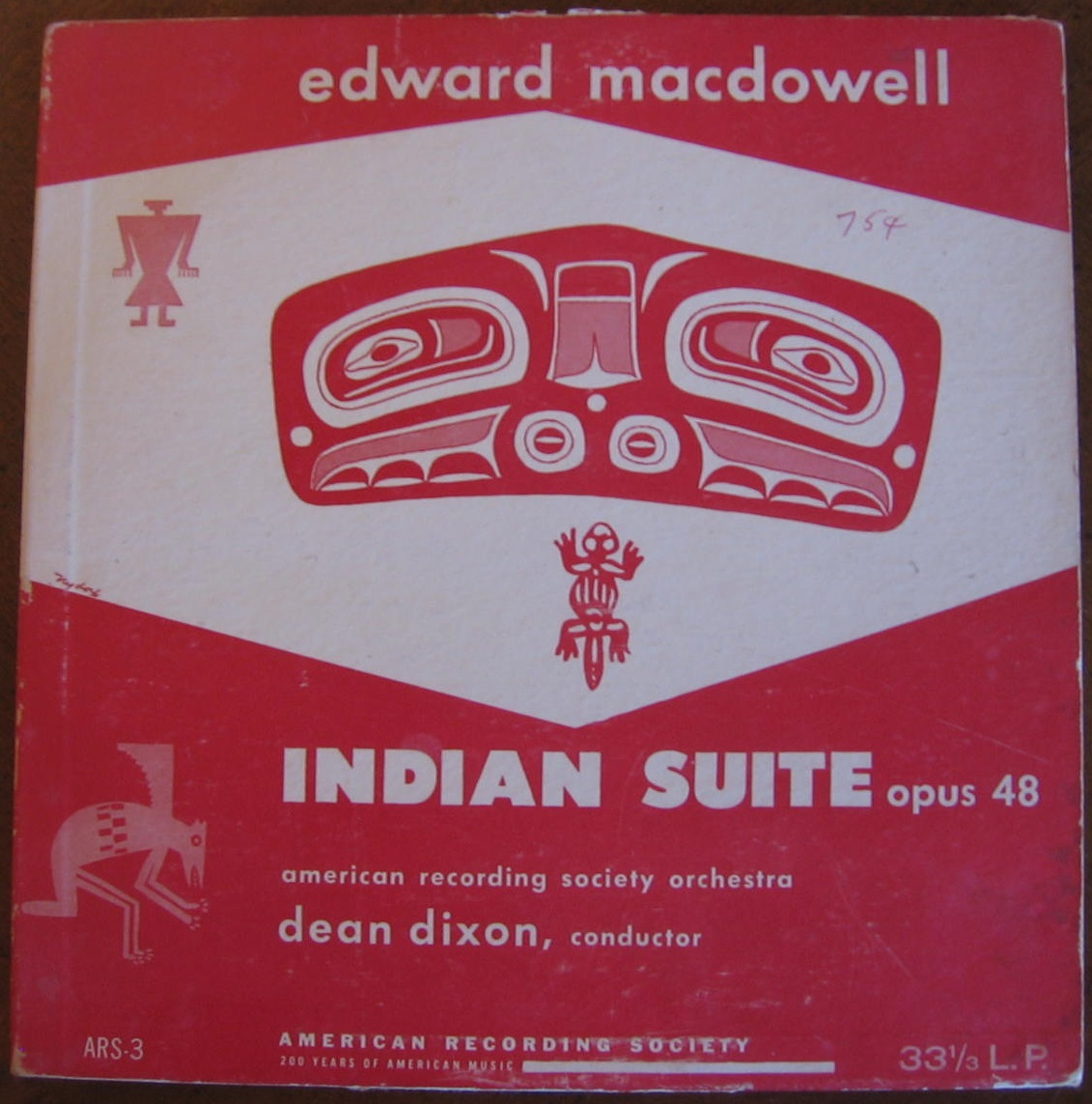
Indian Suite Opus 48 by Edward MacDowell American Recording Society ARS-3 front

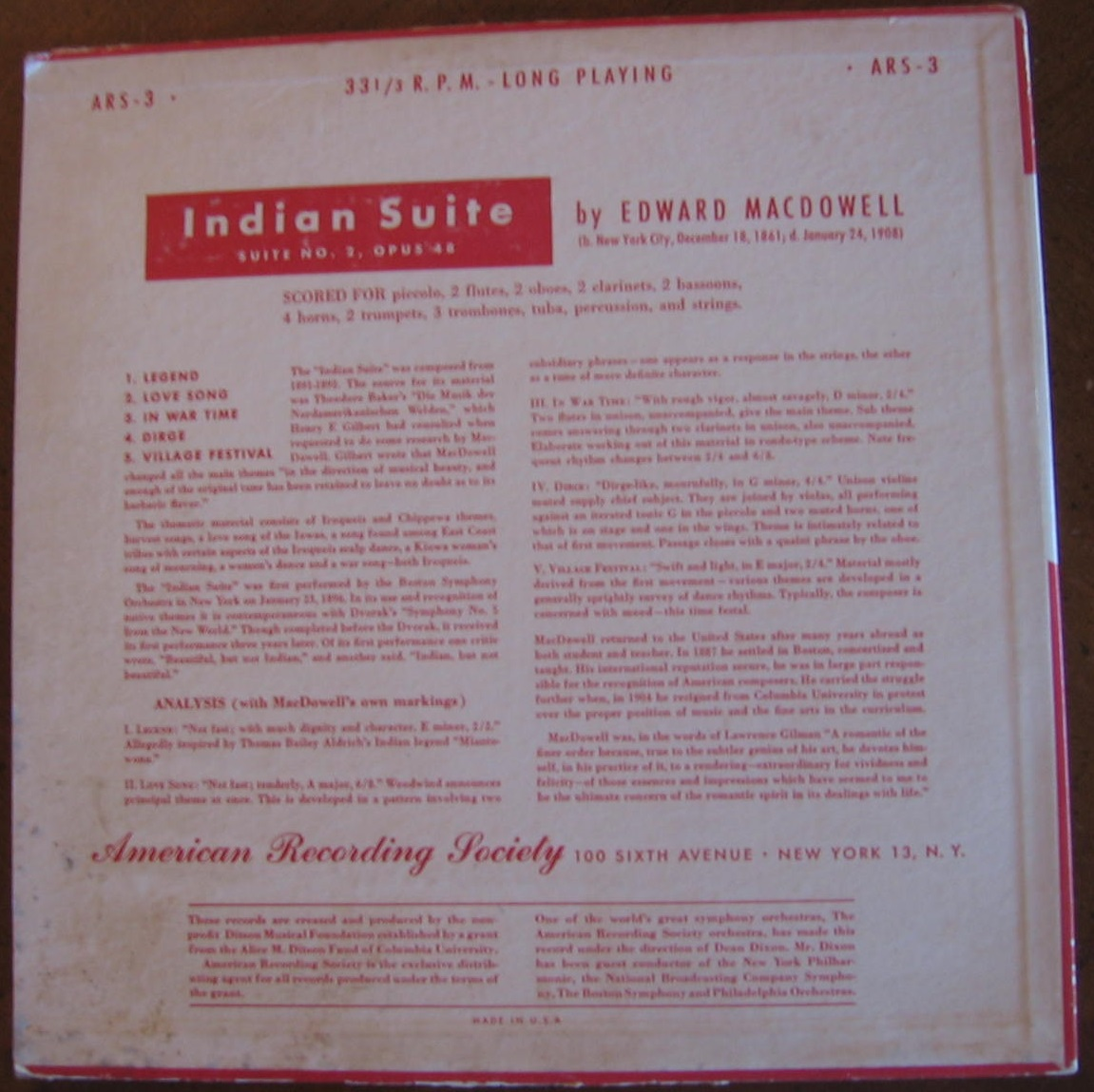
Indian Suite Opus 48 by Edward MacDowell American Recording Society ARS-3 back cover LP

The Indian Suite for orchestra was composed in 1892 by Edward MacDowell. The composer's second suite for orchestra, it was first performed in New York City by the Boston Symphony on January 23, 1896. The piece is based upon numerous American Indian melodies and rhythms.

The suite is in five movements. The first, "Legend," is built upon two themes, both for horns. The second, "Love Song," is derived from a love song of the Iowa tribe. The third movement is titled "In War-Time" and is martial in character. The fourth movement, "Dirge," is a threnody introduced by the tolling of bells. The fifth and last movement, "Village," is based upon two Iroquois melodies, one in the plucked strings and one played by flute and piccolo accompanied by strings and woodwinds.

A pre-1972 recording was issued by the American Recording Society. It was by Edward MacDowell and included Suite No. 2, Opus 48.

A recording of the suite exists; it is distributed by the Naxos Records label.
