= May Riley Smith =

American poet and clubwoman (1842–1927)

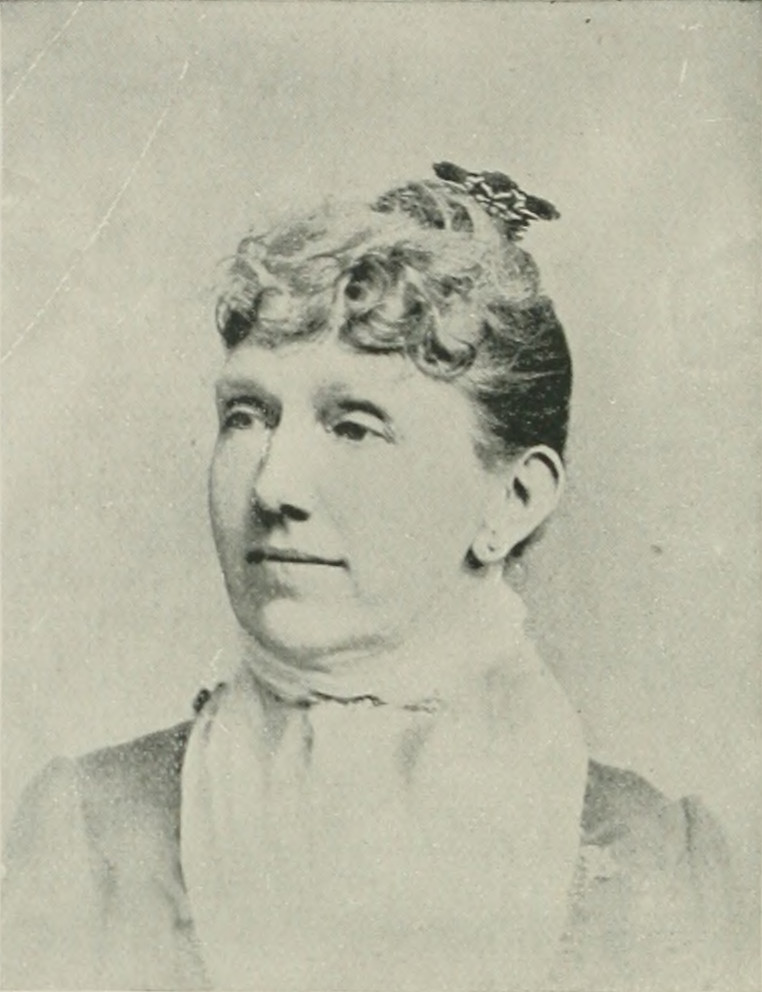
- Mary Louise Riley Smith, "A woman of the century"
- Born: May Riley; May 27, 1842; Rochester, New York
- Died: January 14, 1927 (aged 84); Manhattan, New York
- Occupations: Clubwoman; Poet

May Riley Smith (May 27, 1842 – January 14, 1927) was an American poet and clubwoman.

== Biography ==
May (or Mary) Louise Riley was born on May 27, 1842, in Rochester, New York. (Note: According to Willard (1893), Riley was born in Brighton, Monroe county, New York, May 27, 1852.) She attended Brockport Collegiate Institute. She married Albert Smith, of Springfield, Illinois, a bridge engineer, on March 31, 1869, and they had one son.

Soon, they removed to New York City, where Smith belonged to several literary and social clubs during her life. She was the president of the Sorosis Club from 1911 to 1915 and the club's honorary president from 1919 until her death in 1927. She was also a member of the Poetry Club, Daughters of the American Revolution, the Meridian Club, the Barnard Club, and the MacDowell Club.

Her published books are A Gift of Gentians and Other Verses (New York, 1882), and The Inn of Rest (1888). Among the best and most popular of her poems are "Tired Mothers," "If We Knew," "The Easter Moon," " Love is Sweeter than Rest" and "My Prayer." Among those that have been published separately as booklets are "His Name" and "Sometime". Many of her poems were devotional and were reprinted in hymn books. Her poems were also published in magazines such as Harper's Magazine.

Smith died in Manhattan on January 14, 1927.
