= MacDowell Clubs =

The MacDowell Clubs in the United States were established at the turn of the twentieth century to honor internationally recognized American composer Edward MacDowell. They became part of a broader social movement to promote music and other art forms in America.

== History ==
The first MacDowell music club was established in 1896 in Boston by Edward MacDowell's students — The MacDowell Club of Boston (Edith Noyes Greene was one of the founders). Club in Providence, Rhode Island was founded in 1901, and another one, in Baker City, Oregon, in 1903, another club formed in Conneaut, Ohio in 1903. The MacDowell Club of Canton was founded in 1908; its members donated funds for construction of the Gail Watson Cable Recital Hall. The MacDowell Club of Allied Arts of Los Angeles was established in 1918. In Cincinnati, not a club, but the Cincinnati MacDowell Society was founded in 1913, which formed significant ties with the MacDowell Colony.

At the peak of their popularity before and during the World War II, about 400 independent clubs functioned in the nation. In 1955, Marian MacDowell wrote in a letter, "I suppose in the last forty years there must have been nearly 400; probably there are 300 now." War-time entry of women into the workforce and later social developments decreased the membership, and combined with advances in transportation and communication diminished the role of MacDowell Clubs both as social hubs and entertainment venues. In 2008, fifteen MacDowell Clubs continued to operate, including, in Altus, Oklahoma; Dyersburg, Tennessee; Jackson, Mississippi; Louisville, Kentucky; Canton, Ohio; Chickasha, Oklahoma; Janesville, Wisconsin; and Milwaukee, Wisconsin. As of 2015, such clubs, as the MacDowell Club of Mountain Lakes in New Jersey (established in 1916 by Lazelle Crooks Whitmore), the MacDowell Club of Allied Arts in Oklahoma City (established in 1920 by Hyla Florence Long), the MacDowell Music Club in Janesville, Wisconsin, the MacDowell Music Club of Chattanooga (founded in 1916), and the MacDowell Club of Milwaukee (established in 2008) were functioning.

A typical small club gathering would feature a privately held meeting with invited talks, piano and vocal solos and duets of local performers. Bigger clubs were able to organize academic lectures, concerts, recitals (including Marian MacDowell's or other well-known national performers) and art exhibitions opened to the general public, as well as private dinners, pageants, and balls. Several organizations, including clubs in New York City, Los Angeles, Austin, Illinois, Green Bay, Wisconsin, Canton, Ohio, Chattanooga, Tennessee, Oklahoma City, and Altus, Oklahoma, among others, established student funds and scholarships for youth and developed outreach programs through Junior MacDowell Clubs while continuing to support financially the MacDowell Colony. Several clubs established their own choruses, as in New York City, Boston and Milwaukee; other — vocal ensembles. In Boston, the MacDowell Club Orchestra consisting mainly of amateur and semiprofessional female musicians gave performances in Copley Hall; the MacDowell clubs of New York, Milwaukee, and Los Angeles also formed their own orchestras. All employed well-known conductors, such as Georges Longy, and Arthur Fiedler in Boston; in New York, orchestra was formed in 1929, led by David Mannes, a concertmaster of the New York Symphony Orchestra, and held concerts in Madison Square Garden and the Metropolitan Opera House.

All clubs were responsible for adopting their own bylaws and acted differently in defining their membership: some were accepting musicians only, as the MacDowell Club of Green Bay in Wisconsin, or the Macdowell Club of Mountain Lakes in New Jersey, other subscribed to an allied arts organization philosophy championed by Edward MacDowell as the MacDowell Club of New York City; some were operating strictly as women's clubs, i.e., the MacDowell Club of Mountain Lakes, the MacDowell Club of Los Angeles, or the MacDowell Club of Milwaukee, while other accepted men, as clubs in Boston and New York did. However, most of the MacDowell clubs were "female-only organizations." Many clubs joined the National Federation of Music Clubs.

== MacDowell Club of New York ==
The MacDowell Colony, Inc.
1907 Charter, Paragraph 3

To promote the arts of music, literature and the drama, architecture, painting and sculpture, and the other fine arts; to encourage study, research and production of all branches of art; to develop a sympathetic understanding of their correlation and appreciation of their value; and to broaden their influence: and thus carry forward the life purpose of Edward MacDowell

The MacDowell Club of New York City was established in 1905 and disbanded in 1942. It was among the biggest clubs by the same name around the country honoring the legacy of Edward MacDowell and supporting the MacDowell Colony, the artists' retreat in Peterborough, New Hampshire. The Club funded and awarded a resident scholarship at the MacDowell Colony and made regular financial contributions.

The club charter declared the main goals of the club as following:

To discuss and demonstrate the principles of the arts of music, literature, the drama, painting, sculpture, and architecture, and to aid in the extension of knowledge of works especially fitted to exemplify the finer purposes of these arts, including works deserving wider recognition, and to promote a sympathetic understanding of the correlation of these arts, and to contribute to the broadening of their influences; thus carrying forward the life purpose of Edward MacDowell.

In a few years the membership of the club grew to 600. Club membership included writers, musicians, performing and visual artists, theate and film actors, sculptors, and architects: Hamlin Garland, Richard Watson Gilder, Edwin Arlington Robinson, James Harvey Robinson, John Dewey, Leonora Speyer, Herbert Adams, Robert Aitken, Hobart Nichols, Irving Ramsey Wiles, Ivan Olinsky, F. Luis Mora, Robert Henri, George Bellows, Louise Homer, David Bispham, Katherine Bacon (1896-1952), Francis Stetson Rogers (1870-1951), Charles Coburn, Harriet Rogers (Otis) Dellenbaugh, Beatrice Cameron, Harold Van Buren Magonigle, and May Riley Smith, among others.

=== Facilities ===
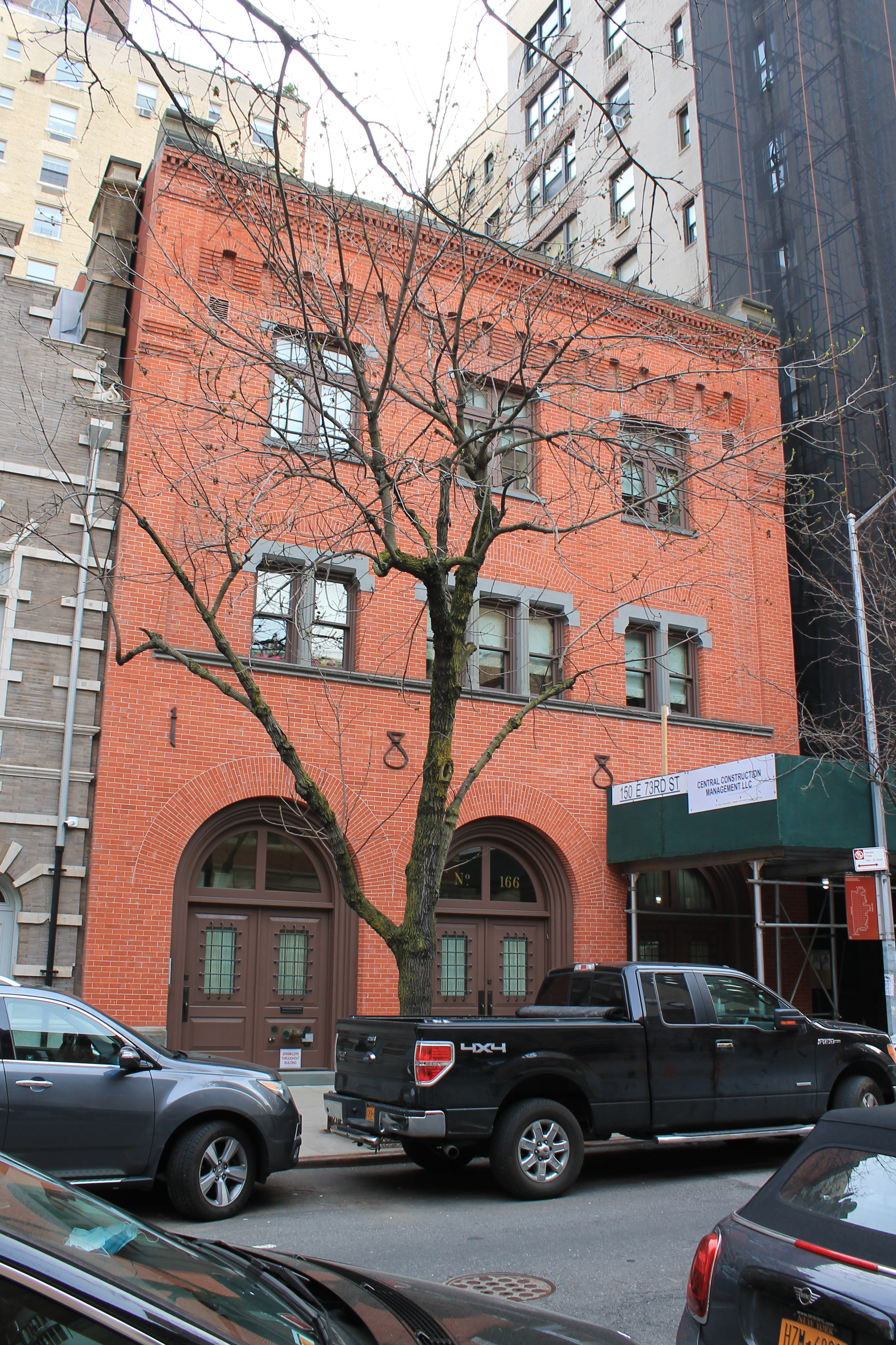
166 East 73rd Street

The MacDowell Club was initially located in the Carnegie Hall studio (1905-1909), then at the old Metropolitan Opera House (1909-1911). In 1911, the Club moved to a spacious building at 108 W 55th Street, which featured a large vaulted gallery.

In 1924, the MacDowell Club purchased the old converted Marquand stable — located at 166 East 73rd Street — from the Joseph Pulitzer estate. Richard Morris Hunt had designed the original building for art collector Henry Gurdon Marquand in 1883. Shortly after Marquand's death in 1902, the building had been sold to Joseph Pulitzer, then publisher of the New York World, who lived several blocks to the east at 73rd and Park. A fire swept the building in 1935 and destroyed prints by Whistler, Hassam and others.

In 1979, the Landmarks Preservation Commission proposed 12 of the 13 stable and garage buildings on the block for designation as part of the East 73rd Street Historic District, excluding the Marquand building. A year later Halina Rosenthal, head of the block association and later founder of the Friends of the Upper East Side Historic Districts, lobbied the commission to include the Marquand stable in the designation, which it did in 1981.

=== MacDowell Chorus ===
The MacDowell Chorus was formed in November 1909, under the direction of Kurt Schindler. Two months after its founding, Gustav Mahler, then the conductor of The New York Philharmonic Orchestra, invited the chorus to perform with the orchestra. In 1912, Schindler changed the name to Schola Cantorum. Schindler continued to conduct the Schola Cantorum until January 1926, when he accepted an offer to take charge of the Roxy Theatre. Hugh Ross later became the director of the chorus.

=== Student Fund Committee ===
The MacDowell Club established a scholarship fund to support aspiring talented young artists, and funded a resident scholarship in Professor George Baker's Drama Workshop at Harvard University, and a resident fellowship at the MacDowell Colony.

=== Notable art exhibitors ===
In 1911, John W. Alexander, the Club's second president, instituted a revolutionary for the time change by introducing an open exhibition, or no jury policy. Group of artists started to select works for exhibition in the MacDowell Club galleries by themselves. Many talented, but previously unrecognized artists, such as Stuart Davis, Edward Hopper, Yasuo Kuniyoshi, among others, received an opportunity to promote their works.

Among the notable art exhibitors were:

- Edward Hopper, 1912
- Colin Campbell Cooper, 1912
- George Bellows, 1917
- C.K. Chatterton, 1917
- William Laurel Harris, Saint Francis de Sales before Pope Clement VIII
- Helen Farnsworth Mears, one of 3 bronze bas-reliefs of Edward MacDowell
- Abraham Jacob Bogdanove, 1918

=== Presidents ===
- Eugene Heffley
- John White Alexander
- Frederick Stokes
- Ernest Peixotto
- Frederick S. Dellenbaugh
- Benjamin Prince
- Cecil Smith
- Hartwell Cahell

=== Charter members ===
- Kate Sara Chittenden
- Mrs. Edgar L. Street (b. Somerset, Pennsylvania; d. 1935 New York City)
