= Rosario Marciano =

Classical pianist, musicologist and teacher

Rosario Marciano (July 5, 1944, in Caracas, Venezuela – September 4, 1998, in Caracas, Venezuela) was a classical pianist, musicologist and teacher.

== Life and career ==
Rosario Marciano was a musician who combined performance, scholarship and teaching. She gave her first solo concert at the age of six and her first concert with orchestra at nine Having completed her studies in her native country she went to Austria where she continued them under the guidance of Paul Badura-Skoda, Jörg Demus, Alfred Brendel and Hans Kann. She won 1964 the Salzburg Piano Competition (the first prize) and 1967 the Mannheimer Tage.

She was among the first pianists to record on historic pianos (fortepianos), recording a recital of Schubert piano music in the early 1970s. Her extensive discography also includes recordings of rarely heard works by women composers, including Cécile Chaminade's Concertstück for piano and Orchestra, Op 40, Germaine Tailleferre's Ballade for piano & orchestra, as well as works by Agathe Backer Grøndahl, Amy Beach, Teresa Carreño, Clara Schumann and Ingeborg von Bronsart, Princess Anna Amalia of Prussia, Catherina Cibbini-Kozeluch, Fanny Mendelssohn and Maria Agata Szymanowska.

She also championed the piano music of her fellow countrymen, recording a number of anthologies. The Museo del Teclado in Caracas accommodating her piano collection of historic instruments, was founded by her. She achieved obligatory music lessons for pupils in Venezuelan schools in 1973.

She wrote a biography of Teresa Carreño (1853–1917) the Venezuelan pianist and composer, and edited modern editions of her music. She was awarded the Theodor Korner prize for her scholarship on women composers. 1994-1998, she was a professor for piano at the University of Music and Performing Arts in Vienna, Austria.

She is commemorated by the Rosario Marciano Prize, awarded by the Vienna International Pianists Association in cooperation with VenKultur, the Venezuelan Culture Association in Austria.
