= James Philip Dunn =

American composer and organist

James Philip Dunn (January 10, 1884, New York – July 24, 1936, Jersey City, New Jersey) was an American composer and organist in New York, Jersey City and Bayonne, New Jersey. At Columbia University, he was a pupil of Cornelius Rybner and Edward MacDowell.

== Work List ==
- Chanson Passionée: Romance, 1916
- Surrexit Christus Hodie
- Cortège Orientale, 1921
- Overture on Negro Themes, 1921
- We, 1928
