= Russell Sherman =

American classical pianist (1930–2023)

- Sherman in the 1970s
- Born: March 25, 1930; New York City, U.S.
- Died: September 30, 2023 (aged 93); Lexington, Massachusetts, U.S.
- Occupations: Classical pianist; Academic teacher; Author
- Organizations: New England Conservatory

Russell Sherman (March 25, 1930 – September 30, 2023) was an American classical pianist, educator and author. He performed internationally, known especially for playing the music of Beethoven and Liszt. Driven by a "lifelong battle to reconstitute Liszt as a serious composer", he wrote for a recording of his Transcendental Études: "The poetic idea is central, and the virtuoso elements become so many layers to orchestrate the poetic content".

Sherman was a teacher at the New England Conservatory in Boston for more than half a century, influencing generations of students.

== Life and career ==
Russell Sherman was born in Manhattan on March 25, 1930, the youngest son of four. He grew up in the Essex House hotel, where neighbors included Rudolf Bing, Lily Pons, Lauritz Melchior and Clifford Curzon. His father was a manufacturer of women's raincoats. His mother had tried to encourage all children to learn the piano, but was successful only with him—he began lessons at age six. At age eleven, he was accepted by Eduard Steuermann, who had studied and become friends with Arnold Schoenberg and Ferruccio Busoni. Steuermann taught him that "music was about joy and play, not just technical mastery". Sherman also studied humanities at Columbia University, graduating with a bachelor's degree in 1949, and later studied composition, with Erich Itor Kahn.

=== Pianist ===
Sherman made his debut as a pianist at the Town Hall in New York City in 1945, at age 15, as a soloist with the New York Philharmonic, conducted by Leonard Bernstein. In 1959, he went on a hiatus from public performances, moved to the West and focused on teaching.

When he resumed playing concerts in the 1970s, he performed with the Los Angeles Philharmonic, the Boston Symphony Orchestra, the Chicago Symphony Orchestra, and the Philadelphia Orchestra, among others. He performed in recitals throughout the United States, Europe and South America.

=== Teacher ===
Sherman was a teacher at Pomona College and the University of Arizona. In 1967, he accepted an invitation by Gunther Schuller, then the new director of the New England Conservatory in Boston, to teach there as a Chair of the Piano Department. He remained for more than half a century; among his students were Leslie Amper, Marc-André Hamelin, Randall Hodgkinson, Christopher O'Riley and HaeSun Paik, who is now co-chair of piano at the school. He was also the teacher of Wha Kyung Byun, who became a well-known piano instructor, and also his wife. She was also on the faculty of the New England Conservatory. He also taught Kathy Chi, Soojin Ahn, Ning An, Hung-Kuan Chen, Ya-Fei Chuang, Rina Dokshitsky, Hugh Hinton, Norman Krieger, Livan, Heng-Jin Park, Sergey Schepkin, Minsoo Sohn, Kathleen Supové, Christopher Taylor, Craig Smith, Tian Ying, and Zenan Yu. He became a Distinguished Artist-in-Residence at the conservatory, where he also received an Honorary Doctor of Music degree in 2015, and taught as a guest at Harvard University and the Juilliard School in New York City.

=== Author ===
Sherman's book of short essays on piano playing-related concerns, Piano Pieces, was published by Farrar, Straus and Giroux in 1996. Among the observations in Piano Pieces is Sherman's comment, "Music dispels the fear of mortality and the need for rigid and permanent identities. Music rejects the nine-to-five schedule, the hunger for cash, the encroachments and limits of crass appetite."

=== Personal life ===
Sherman was first married to Natasha Koval, a pianist from present-day Ukraine; they had two sons, and were divorced. In 1974, he married Korean-born pianist Wha Kyung Byun. They sometimes celebrated their anniversary by performing together. Sherman was a baseball fan and a photographer interested in trees, light and shadow. He read science books, to think about challenging concepts.

Sherman died at his home in Lexington, Massachusetts, on September 30, 2023, at the age of 93.

== Recordings ==
Schuller, who had invited Sherman to teach in Boston, also made Sherman record for GM records, which Schuller founded. Sherman became the first American pianist to record all Beethoven's piano sonatas and piano concertos. He recorded an album entitled Russell Sherman: Premieres and Commissions, music composed for him in the 1990s, by Schuller, Robert Helps, George Perle, and Ralph Shapey. He also recorded Bach's English Suites, all Mozart's piano sonatas, Chopin's mazurkas, and music by Claude Debussy and Arnold Schoenberg.

He recorded many works by Franz Liszt, driven by a "lifelong battle to reconstitute Liszt as a serious composer". He recorded the Transcendental Études in 1974, and again in 1990, explaining in the liner notes: "The poetic idea is central, and the virtuoso elements become so many layers to orchestrate the poetic content".
