= Sandy Gellis =

American artist (born 1940)

Sandy Gellis (born 1940) is an American artist known for her artworks that depict and interpret the natural environment. Her work is included in the collections of the Whitney Museum of American Art and the Brooklyn Museum.
