= Norman Krieger =

American pianist

Norman Krieger is an American pianist and a Dean Charles H. Webb Chair in Music, professor of music in piano, and chair of the Piano Department professor at the Jacobs School of Music at Indiana University. He is a recipient of numerous prizes, including ones from the Paderewski Foundation., Bruce Hungerford Memorial Prize, Victor Herbert Memorial Prize, Buffalo Philharmonic Young Artists Competition Prize, and Saint Louis Symphony Prize, and the Gold Medal Winner of the first Palm Beach Invitational Piano Competition. He studied under the guidance of Esther Lipton in Los Angeles. By the age of 15, he obtained a scholarship from the Juilliard School, where he was educated by Adele Marcus.

He was Alfred Brendel's and Maria Curcio's student in London, and he obtained an artist's diploma from the New England Conservatory, where he worked with Russell Sherman. By 2011 he became a professor of music at the USC Thornton. He has collaborated with such musicians as Sheri Greenawald, Livia Sohn, Zuill Bailey and Jian Wang as well as both Tokyo and Manhattan String Quartets. He also was invited to the Lincoln Center for the Performing Arts and was a frequent participant at the Mostly Mozart Festival.

He has recorded two Johannes Brahms concertos, which he has also performed with the Arkansas Symphony Orchestra.
