= Marian MacDowell =

American pianist (1857–1956)

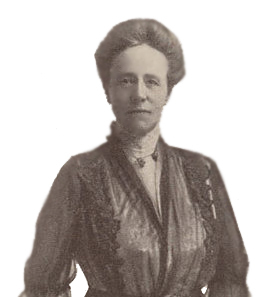
- MacDowell, c. 1920

Background information
- Born: Marian Griswold Nevins; November 22, 1858; New York, New York, U.S.
- Died: August 24, 1956 (aged 97) Los Angeles, California, U.S.
- Genres: Classical
- Occupation: Concert pianist

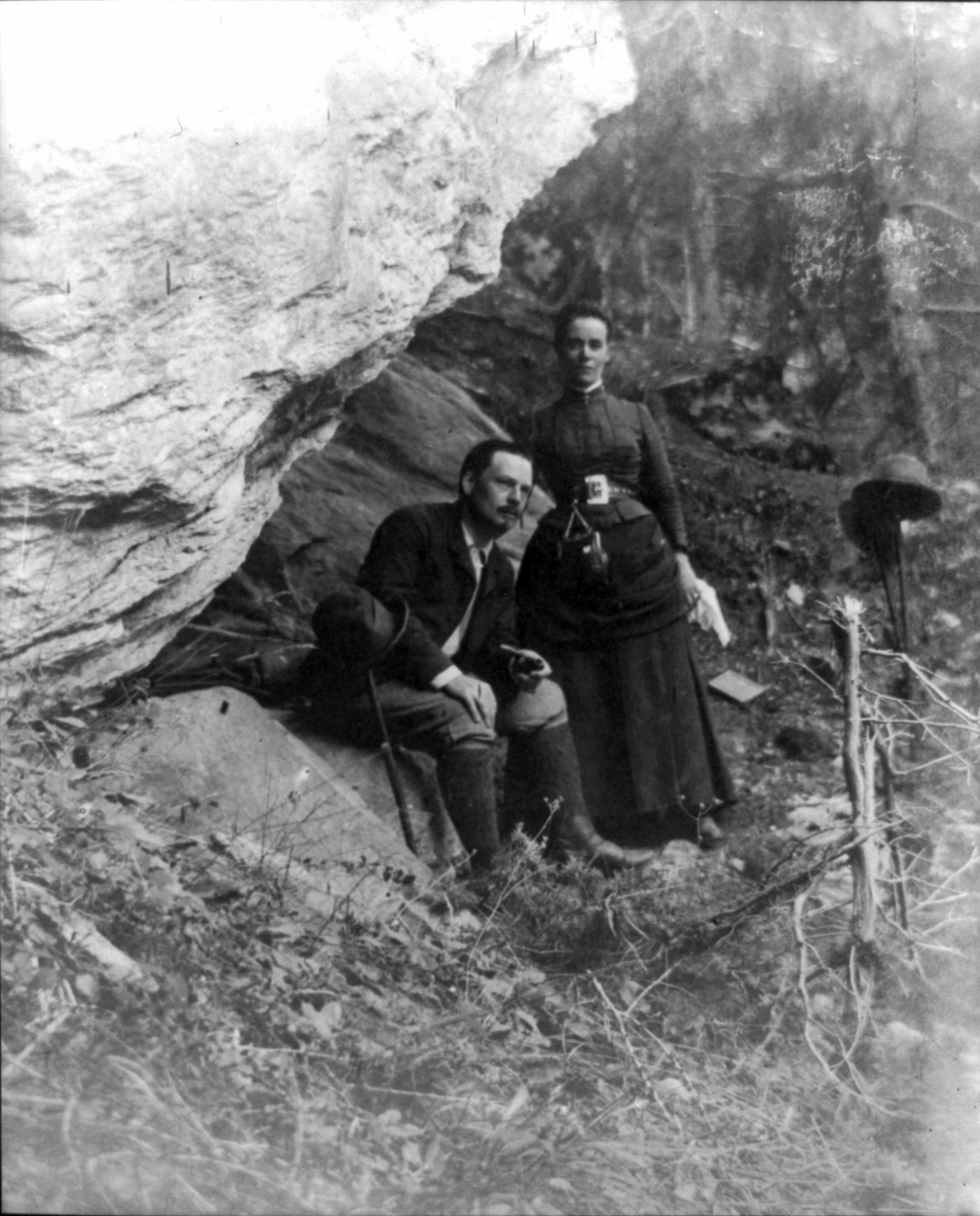
Marian with her husband Edward MacDowell, 1886

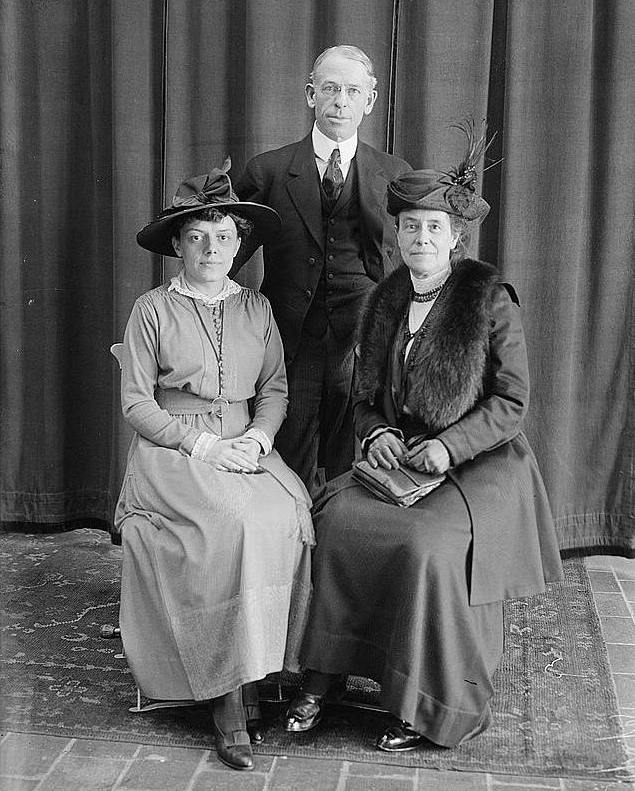
Frances Brundage, Marian MacDowell, and Arthur Nevin in 1917

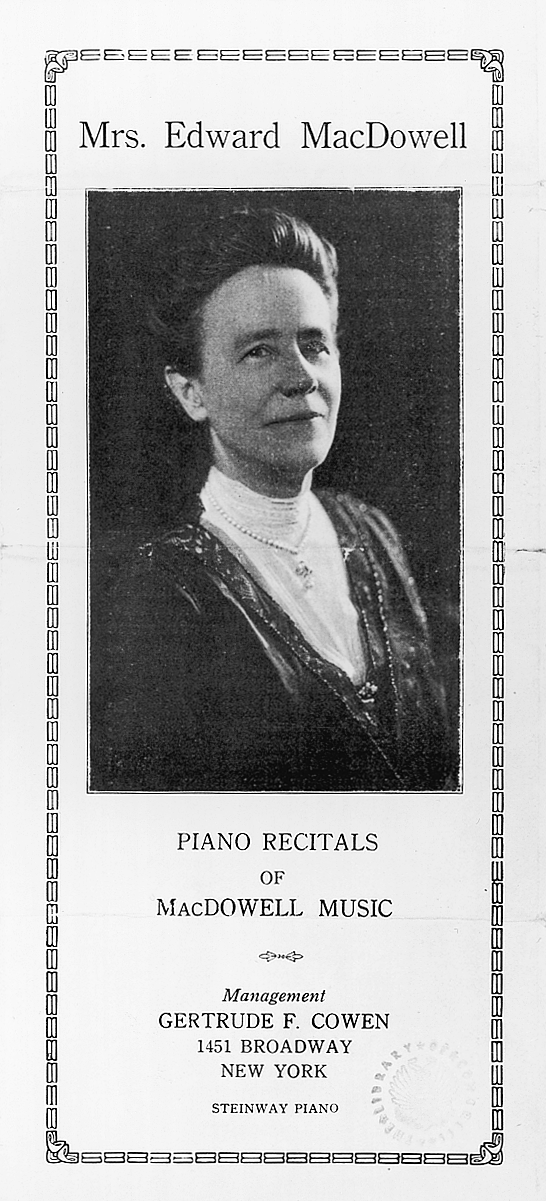
Marian MacDowell piano recitals of MacDowell music (cover of publicity brochure)

Marian MacDowell (maiden name Marian Griswold Nevins) (November 22, 1858 – August 24, 1956) was an American pianist and philanthropist. In 1907, she and her husband Edward MacDowell founded the MacDowell residency for artists in Peterborough, New Hampshire. Her leadership of the artist retreat through two world wars, the Great Depression and other challenges created one of the foremost cultural institutions in the United States, which cultivated the work of generations of musicians, writers, poets, sculptors, and visual artists.

== Life and education ==
Marian Griswold Nevins was born in New York City, the third of five children born to David H. Nevins, a Wall Street banker, and his wife, Cornelia L. Perkins. When she was eight, her mother died in childbirth. Her aunt Caroline Perkins of South Carolina was a talented musician who came to New York to teach piano. She recognized her niece's gifts and encouraged them. As Marian grew older, she realized that she needed to study in Europe, a basis for being taken seriously as a performer or artist at the time. With a chaperone, she left for Frankfurt in 1880 intending to study with Clara Schumann at the Hoch Conservatory. Finding that Clara Schumann was away, Nevins asked for advice in getting another teacher and was referred to Edward MacDowell, a young American composer. After working together for several years, they decided to marry on July 24, 1884. They had one child who was stillborn. From the beginning Marian had great faith in her husband's talent and wanted him to devote himself to composing.

== Family and career ==
During their life together, Marian MacDowell realized that quietness and tranquility of the rural settings would positively affect her husband's work. In 1896, she bought Hillcrest, a farm in Peterborough, New Hampshire, for their summer residence. Marian MacDowell had a log studio built in the woods where Edward MacDowell composed. He appreciated the place, which was visited by their artistic friends. The MacDowells realized that artists can be stimulated by interacting with people from other disciplines, and they developed plans of creating a place where artists could come, live and interact together.

In 1904, Edward MacDowell began to show evidence of a nervous disorder with bouts of dementia that ended his composing and teaching career. He lost virtually all mental capacity. Marian cared for him to the end of his life in 1908, in his last years with the help of a nurse Anna Baetz, who later became known as the nurse of Edward MacDowell. After Edward's death, Anna Baetz stayed with Marian MacDowell for eighteen years helping with the MacDowell Colony.

In 1907, Marian MacDowell initiated her and Edward's plans for an artists' colony, founding a residential institution in Peterborough, New Hampshire, where artists could live in residence and work. She conceived of ways to support both artists' need for solitude and for interaction, and transferred the deed of property for Hillcrest Farm to the Edward MacDowell Association.

In the summer of 1907, the first artists were invited: Helen Mears, a sculptor, and her sister Mary Mears (1876-1943), a writer. The latter published an article about the colony in the July 1909 issue of The Craftsman, which gave it much needed publicity. The MacDowell Colony started to receive support from benefactors, such as Elizabeth Sprague Coolidge. In 1923, the Pictorial Review awarded Marian MacDowell $5,000 Annual Achievement Award for "the most valuable contribution to American life during the year." At that time, the MacDowell Colony had nineteen studios on 500 acres and 300 applications for residency. (In 1997, there were 32 studios to accommodate MacDowell fellows and residents.)

To raise funds, Marian MacDowell began lecturing to women's clubs and musical groups. Encouraged at one session, she resumed her performing career at the age of fifty, and became the foremost interpreter of Edward MacDowell's music. She shared her insights in Random Notes on Edward MacDowell and his Music (1950). During twenty-five years she performed more than 400 recitals in the United States and Canada raising money for the endowment of MacDowell Colony of Peterborough. Ernest Hutcheson thought of her and Amy Beach as "remarkably good concert pianists".

Marian MacDowell frequently performed concerts for women's musical clubs named after Edward MacDowell — the MacDowell clubs. She inspired the formation of some of the MacDowell clubs and united ones that previously existed. These clubs, a total of 400 at the peak of their popularity, became to serve as significant donors to the MacDowell Colony and, in turn, brought the arts to their local communities. Marian MacDowell maintained close relationships with many of these clubs throughout her life, in addition to umbrella organizations such as the National Federation of Music Clubs and professional music sororities: Sigma Alpha Iota, Delta Omicron, Phi Beta, and Alpha Chi Omega. She said that women's groups raised far more money than did men's fraternities.

Marian MacDowell was traveling in the United States and Canada giving lectures and recitals until 1938. In 1947, she stepped down from executive directorship at the Edward MacDowell Association.

Marian MacDowell died on August 24, 1956, in Los Angeles, California.

== Legacy ==
Through her unceasing efforts to support both female and male artists in all disciplines, Marian MacDowell became a leading figure for the arts in the United States. The colony supported generations of artists in her lifetime, whose work expressed and contributed to American life. It continues to do so as around 250 artists-in-residence arrive there yearly to create and interact. In 1997, the MacDowell Colony received the National Medal of Arts in recognition of "nurturing and inspiring many of this century's finest artists." It was counted in 1997 that, "more 1,300 visual artists (besides lots of writers, composers, film makers and architects) have put in quality time at MacDowell, the country's oldest and largest cultural retreat." Among the nationally known artists who were MacDowell fellows are: composers Aaron Copland, Leonard Bernstein, and Amy Beach; printmakers Benny Andrews, Tomei Arai, Milton Avery, Cynthia Back, Robert Cottingham, Janet Fish, and Sandy Gellis; photographers Marion Belanger and Rosalind Solomon; poets Galway Kinnell, Kay Boyle and Edwin Arlington Robinson; novelists Willa Cather, James Baldwin, and Spalding Gray; and playwrights Thornton Wilder, Dorothy and DuBose Heyward, to name a few. Such American classics as Thornton Wilder's Our Town, Aaron Copland's ballet Billy the Kid, and Dorothy and DuBose Heyward's play Porgy are directly connected to the MacDowell Colony.

== Honors ==
Marian MacDowell was awarded honorary degrees from numerous academic, artistic and media institutions:

- 1930, University of New Hampshire, Durham
- 1938, New Jersey State College for Women, New Brunswick
- 1939, Middlebury College, Vermont

Other awards included:

- 1932, Annual Achievement Award, Pictorial Review
- 1940, The Charles Holmes Pettee Medal from the University of New Hampshire, Durham
- Henry Hadley Medal, National Association for American Composers and Conductors, for outstanding service to music
- At the age of 92, Marian MacDowell was honored by the National Institute of Arts and Letters for her distinguished service in the arts
- In 1997, MacDowell was awarded the National Medal of Arts

Papers of the Edward and Marian MacDowell Collection and the MacDowell Colony are held by the Library of Congress.

== See also ==
- New Hampshire Historical Marker No. 206: The MacDowell Graves
