= Edward MacDowell =

American composer (1860–1908)

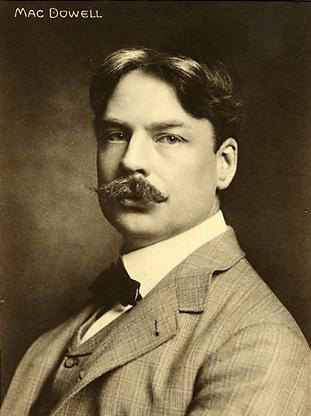
- MacDowell c. 1900
- Born: December 18, 1860; New York City, U.S.
- Died: January 23, 1908 (aged 47); New York City, U.S.
- Occupations: composer; pianist
- Works: List of compositions
- Spouse: Marian MacDowell

Signature
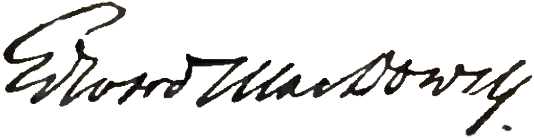

Edward Alexander MacDowell (December 18, 1860 – January 23, 1908) was an American composer and pianist of the late Romantic period. He was best known for his second piano concerto and his piano suites Woodland Sketches, Sea Pieces and New England Idylls. Woodland Sketches includes his most popular short piece, "To a Wild Rose". In 1904 he was one of the first seven Americans honored by membership in the American Academy of Arts and Letters.

== Studies ==
Edward MacDowell was born in New York City to Thomas MacDowell, a Manhattan milk dealer, and Frances "Fanny" Mary Knapp. He received his first piano lessons from Juan Buitrago, a Colombian violinist who was living with the MacDowell family at the time. He also received music lessons from friends of Buitrago, including the Cuban pianist Pablo Desverine and Venezuelan pianist and composer Teresa Carreño. MacDowell's mother decided to take her son to Paris, France, where in 1877 he was admitted to the Paris Conservatory after receiving a competitive scholarship for international students.

After two years of studies under Antoine François Marmontel and being at the top of his class, he continued his education at Dr. Hoch's Conservatory in Frankfurt, Germany, where he studied piano with Carl Heymann and composition with Joachim Raff. When Franz Liszt and Clara Schumann visited the conservatory in early 1880 and attended a recital of student compositions, MacDowell performed Robert Schumann's Quintet, Op. 44 along with a transcription of a Liszt symphonic poem. The next year, he paid a visit to Liszt in Weimar and performed some of his own compositions. Liszt recommended MacDowell's First Modern Suite, Op. 10 to Allgemeiner Deutscher Musikverein for performance and also introduced him to Leipzig music publishers at Breitkopf & Härtel.

After finishing his studies in 1881, MacDowell remained for a while in Germany, where he composed, performed on stage and gave piano lessons. He taught piano at various places in Darmstadt during 1881–1884, including the Schmitt's Akademie für Tonkunst (now known as the Akademie für Tonkunst), and in Wiesbaden, 1884–1888.

== Marriage and family ==
In 1884, MacDowell married Marian Griswold Nevins, an American who had been one of his piano students in Frankfurt for three years. About the time that MacDowell composed a piano piece titled Cradle Song, Marian suffered an illness that resulted in her being unable to bear children.

== Career ==
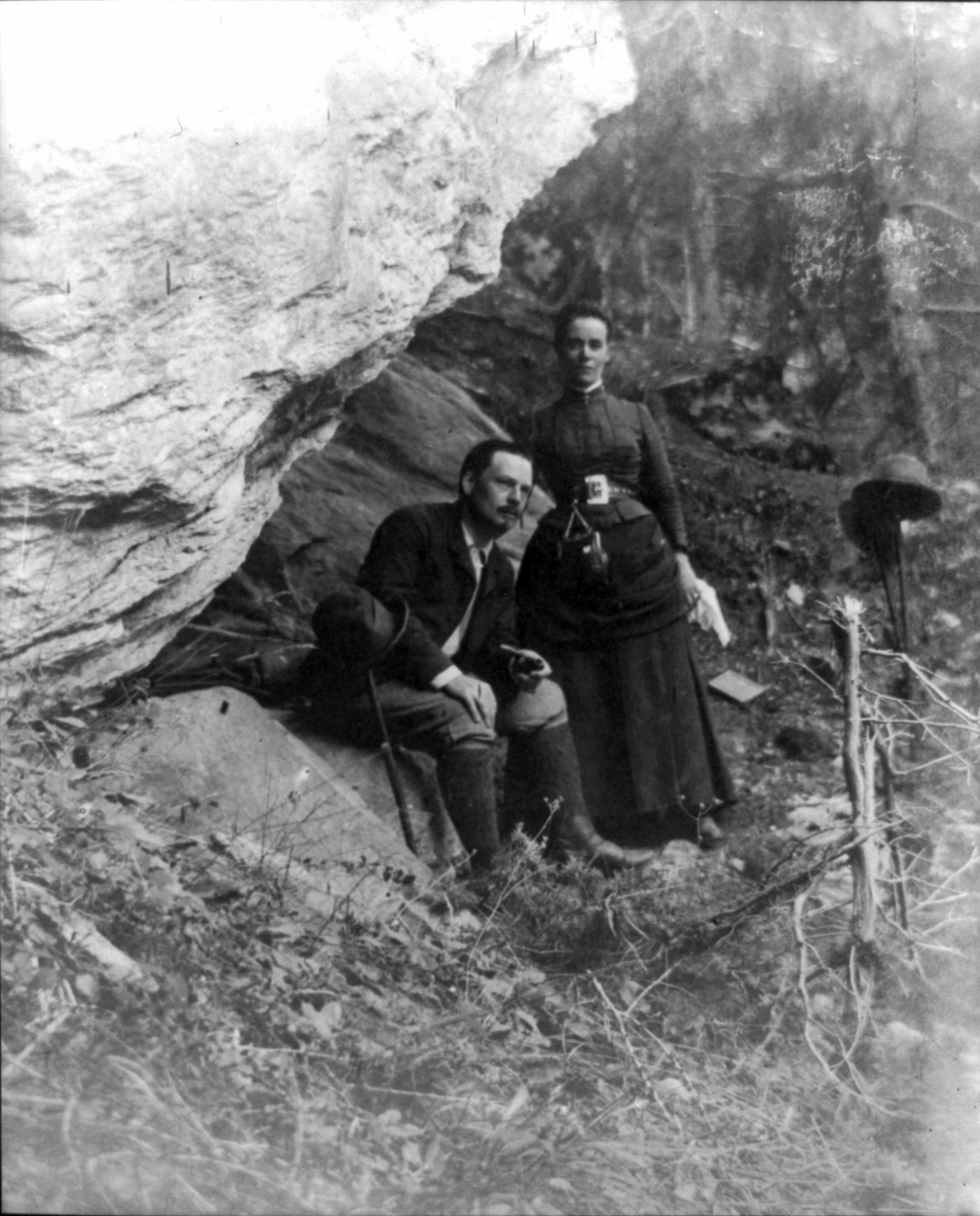
Edward and Marian MacDowell; (c. 1886)

In Germany, the MacDowells settled first in Frankfurt, then in Darmstadt, and finally, in Wiesbaden. From 1885 to 1888, MacDowell devoted himself almost exclusively to composition. That brought financial difficulties, and he decided to return to the United States in the autumn of 1888. He made Boston his new home, where he became well known as a concert pianist and piano teacher. He performed in recitals with the Boston Symphony Orchestra and other American musical organizations.

The MacDowells lived in Boston until 1896, when Edward was appointed professor of music at Columbia University, the first music professor in the university's history. He was personally invited to Columbia University by its president Seth Low to create a music department. He stayed at Columbia until 1904. In addition to composing and teaching, from 1896 to 1898 he directed the Mendelssohn Glee Club. MacDowell composed some music for the group to perform.

In 1896, Marian MacDowell purchased Hillcrest Farm, to serve as their summer residence in Peterborough, New Hampshire. MacDowell found his creativity flourished in the beautiful rural setting. His compositions included two piano concertos, two orchestral suites, four symphonic poems, four piano sonatas, piano suites, and songs. He also published dozens of piano transcriptions of mostly 18th century pre-piano keyboard pieces.

From 1896 to 1898, MacDowell also published 13 piano pieces and 4 part songs under the pseudonym of Edgar Thorn. These compositions were not mentioned in Lawrence Gilman's 1909 biography of MacDowell. They were listed without opus numbers in MacDowell's Critical and Historical Essays (1912) and in John F. Porte's Edward MacDowell (1922). They were listed with opus numbers in Oscar Sonneck's Catalogue of First Editions of Edward MacDowell (1917).

MacDowell was also a noted teacher of the piano and music composition. His students included James Dunn, E. Ray Goetz, Frances Tarbox and John Pierce Langs, a student from Buffalo, New York, with whom he became very close friends. Langs was also close to noted Canadian pianist Harold Bradley, and both championed MacDowell's piano compositions. The linguist Edward Sapir was also among his students.

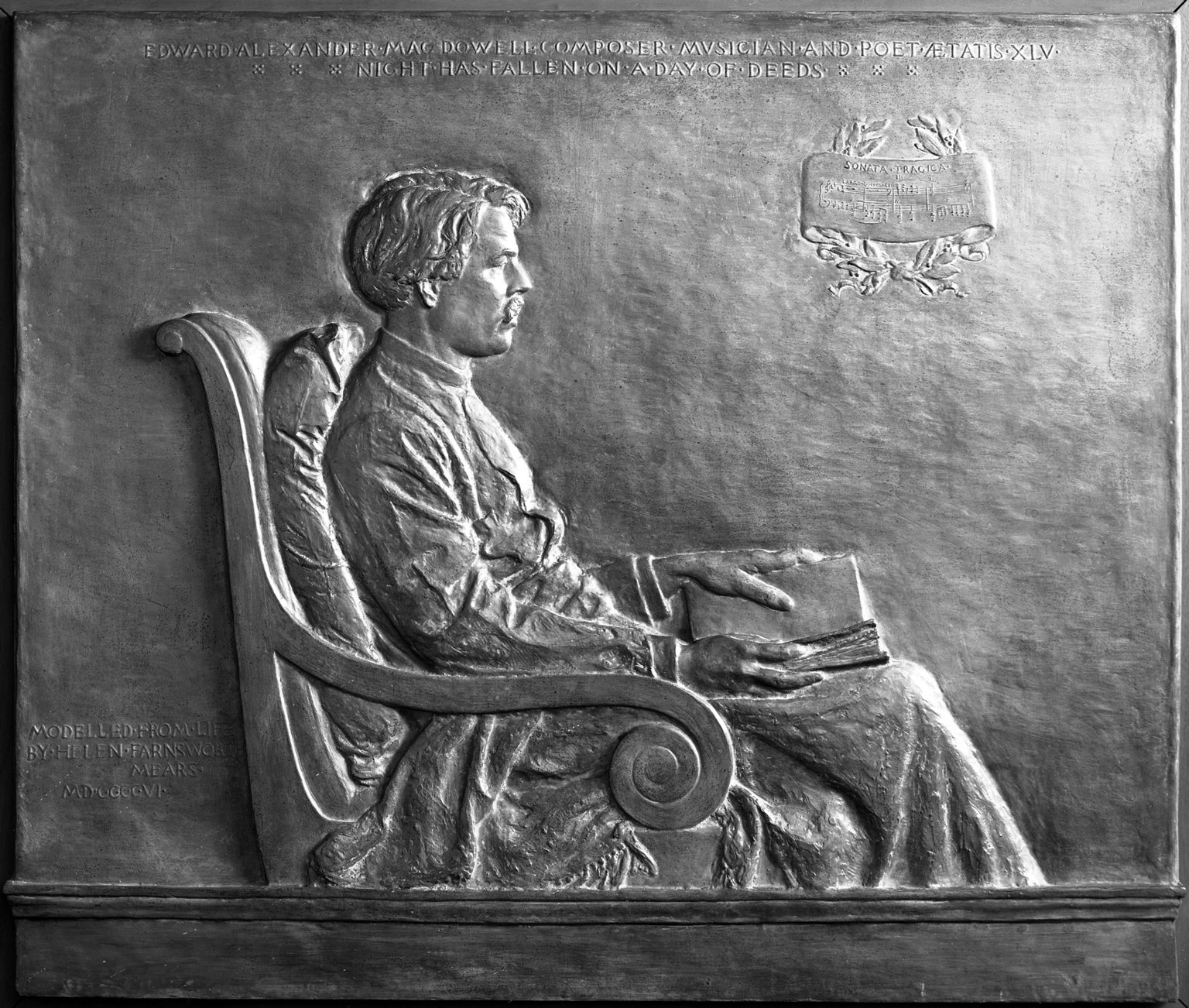
Bronze relief of MacDowell by Helen Farnsworth Mears (1906, cast 1907) Brooklyn Museum

MacDowell was often stressed in his position at Columbia University, due to both administrative duties and growing conflict with the new university president Nicholas Murray Butler around a proposed two-course requirement in fine arts for all undergraduate students, as well as creation of combined Department of Fine Arts overseeing music, sculpture, painting and comparative literature. After Butler stripped the academic affairs voting rights of Columbia faculty members in the arts and accused MacDowell of unprofessional conduct and sloppy teaching, in February 1904, MacDowell abruptly announced his resignation, raising an unfortunate public controversy.

After stepping down from Columbia professorship, MacDowell fell into depression and his health rapidly deteriorated. E. Douglas Bomberger's biography notes that MacDowell suffered from seasonal affective disorder throughout his life, and often made decisions with negative implications in the darkest months of the year. Bomberger advances a new theory for the sudden decline of MacDowell's health: bromide poisoning, which was sometimes mistaken for paresis at the time, as was the case with MacDowell's death certificate. Indeed, MacDowell had long suffered from insomnia, for which bromides were the standard treatment, and bromides were used in many common remedies of the day. MacDowell was also in contact with bromides through his hobby of photography.

A 1904 accident in which MacDowell was run over by a Hansom cab on Broadway may have contributed to his growing psychiatric disorder and resulting dementia. Of his final years, Lawrence Gilman, a contemporary, wrote: "His mind became as that of a little child. He sat quietly, day after day, in a chair by a window, smiling patiently from time to time at those about him, turning the pages of a book of fairy tales that seemed to give him a definite pleasure, and greeting with a fugitive gleam of recognition certain of his more intimate friends".

The Mendelssohn Glee Club raised money to help the MacDowells. Friends launched a public appeal to raise funds for his care; among the signers were Horatio Parker, Victor Herbert, Arthur Foote, George Whitefield Chadwick, Frederick Converse, Andrew Carnegie, J. P. Morgan, New York Mayor Seth Low, and former President Grover Cleveland.

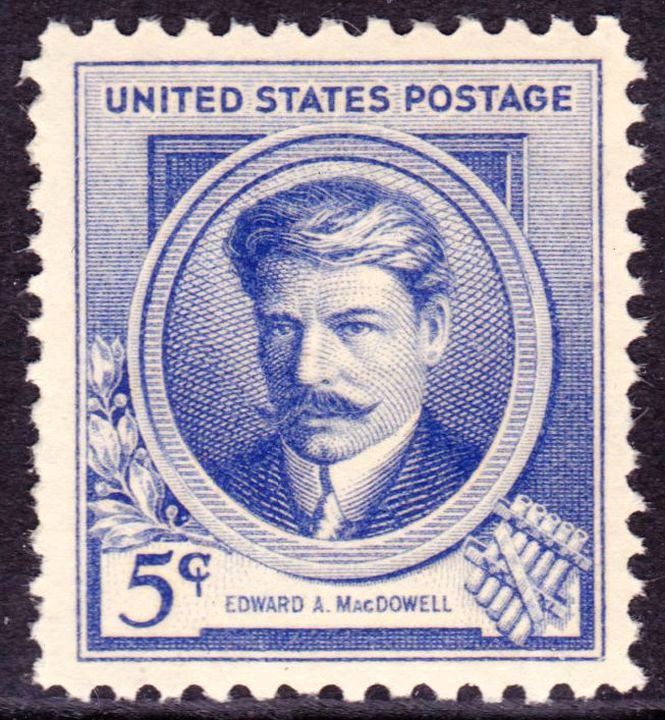
Edward A. MacDowell, US Postage, Issue of 1940

Marian MacDowell cared for her husband to the end of his life. In 1907, the composer and his wife founded MacDowell (artists' residency and workshop) (formerly known as The MacDowell Colony) by deeding the Hillcrest Farm to the newly established Edward MacDowell Association. MacDowell died in 1908 in New York City and was buried at his beloved Hillcrest Farm.

== Legacy and honors ==
In 1896, Princeton University awarded MacDowell an honorary degree of Doctor of Music. In 1899, he was elected as the president of the Society of American Musicians and Composers (New York). In 1904, he became one of the first seven people chosen for membership in the American Academy of Arts and Letters. After this experience, the MacDowells envisioned establishing a residency for artists near their summer home in Peterborough, New Hampshire.

The MacDowell (artists' residency and workshop), a multidisciplinary artists' retreat, continued to honor the composer's memory after his death by supporting the work of other artists in an interdisciplinary environment. With time, it created an important part of MacDowell's legacy. Marian MacDowell led the Edward MacDowell Association and Colony for more than 25 years, strengthening its initial endowment by resuming her piano performances and creating a wide circle of donors, especially among women's clubs and musical sororities and around 400 MacDowell music clubs. The Edward MacDowell Association backed many American composers, including Aaron Copland, Edgard Varese, Roger Sessions, William Schuman, Walter Piston, Samuel Barber, Elliott Carter, and Leonard Bernstein, in the beginning phases of their careers by awarding them residencies, fellowships, and the Edward MacDowell Medal. Between 1925 and 1956, Copland received a fellowship eight times; in 1961 he was awarded the Edward MacDowell Medal, and he served himself for 34 years on the board of Association and Colony. Amy Beach was at MacDowell on fellowships from its beginning for many summers while she was in her middle to later career.

After his death, MacDowell was considered a great, internationally known American composer. In 1940, MacDowell was one of five American composers honored in a series of United States postage stamps. The other four composers were Stephen Foster, John Philip Sousa, Victor Herbert, and Ethelbert Nevin. However, as the twentieth century progressed, his fame was eclipsed by such American composers as Charles Ives, Aaron Copland, and Roy Harris. In 1950s, Gilbert Chase, an American music historian and critic, wrote, "When Edward MacDowell appeared on the scene, many Americans felt that here at last was 'the great American composer' awaited by the nation. But MacDowell was not a great composer. At his best he was a gifted miniaturist with an individual manner. Creatively, he looked toward the past, not toward the future. He does not mark the beginning of a new epoch in American music, but the closing of a fading era, the fin de siecle decline of the genteel tradition which had dominated American art since the days of Hopkinson and Hewitt". In the 1970s, John Gillespie reaffirmed Chase's opinion by writing that MacDowell's place in time "accounts for his decreasing popularity; he does not belong with the great Romantics, Schumann and Brahms, but neither can be regarded as a precursor of twentieth century music". Other critics, such as Virgil Thomson, maintained that MacDowell's legacy would be reconsidered and regain a place proper to its significance in the history of American music.

As romantic tradition in music never lost its relevance and importance, the twenty-first century brought a reassessment of MacDowell's legacy not only as a talented piano virtuoso and piano composer, but also as one of America's preeminent composers. On February 14, 2000, he was inducted into a national Classical Music Hall of Fame. MacDowell's two concertos are now perceived as the "most important works in the genre by an American composer other than Gershwin". His four sonatas, two orchestral suites and multiple solo piano pieces are performed and recorded.

== Works ==
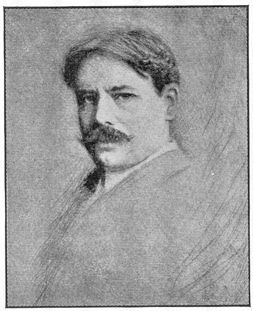
Portrait of Edward MacDowell

The following lists were compiled from information in collections of sheet music, Lawrence Gilman's Edward MacDowell: A Study (1908), Oscar Sonneck's Catalogue of First Editions of Edward MacDowell (1917), and John F. Porte's Edward MacDowell (1922).

Published compositions for piano, a complete listing

- Op. 1 Amourette (1896) (as Edgar Thorn)
- Op. 2 In Lilting Rhythm (1897) (as Edgar Thorn)
- Op. 4 Forgotten Fairy Tales (1897) (as Edgar Thorn)
- Op. 7 Six Fancies (1898) (as Edgar Thorn)
- In 1895, an "Op. 8 Waltz" for piano by MacDowell was listed by Breitkopf & Härtel, but no price was shown, and the piece was not published.
- Op. 10 First Modern Suite (1883)
- Op. 13 Prelude and Fugue (1883)
- Op. 14 Second Modern Suite (1883)
- Op. 15 Piano Concerto No. 1 (1885)
- Op. 16 Serenata (1883)
- Op. 17 Two Fantastic Pieces (1884)
- Op. 18 Two Compositions (1884)
- Op. 19 Forest Idylls (1884)
- Op. 20 Three Poems (1886) duets
- Op. 21 Moon Pictures (1886) duets after Hans Christian Andersen's "Picture-book without Pictures"
- Op. 23 Piano Concerto No. 2 (1890)
- Op. 24 Four Compositions (1887)
- Op. 28 Six Idylls after Goethe (1887)
- Op. 31 Six Poems after Heine (1887,1901)
- Op. 32 Four Little Poems (1888)
- Op. 36 Etude de Concert (1889)
- Op. 37 Les Orientales (1889)
- Op. 38 Marionettes (1888,1901)
- Op. 39 12 Etudes (1890)
- Op. 45 Sonata Tragica (1893)
- Op. 46 Twelve Virtuoso Studies (1894)
- Op. 49 Air and Rigaudon (1894)
- Op. 50 Sonata Eroica (1895) "Flos regum Arthurus"
- Op. 51 Woodland Sketches (1896) (for Robert La Fosse's ballet, see Woodland Sketches (ballet))
- Op. 55 Sea Pieces (1898)
- Op. 57 Third Sonata (1900)
- Op. 59 Fourth Sonata (1901)
- Op. 61 Fireside Tales (1902)
- Op. 62 New England Idylls (1902)

MacDowell published two books of Technical Exercises for piano; piano duet transcriptions of Hamlet and Ophelia for orchestra (Op. 22); First Suite for orchestra (Op. 42); and a piano solo version of Op. 42, No. 4, The Shepherdess' Song, renamed The Song of the Shepherdess. MacDowell composed his First Piano Concerto in the key of A minor in 1885 and published it as his Op.15. It is in three movements: Maestoso - Allegro con fuoco, Andante tranquillo, and Presto

Published compositions for orchestra (complete)

- Op. 15 Piano Concerto No. 1 (1885)
- Op. 22 Hamlet and Ophelia (1885)
- Op. 23 Piano Concerto No. 2 (1890)
- Op. 25 Lancelot and Elaine (1888)
- Op. 29 Lamia (1908)
- Op. 30 Two Fragments after the Song of Roland (1891) I. The Saracens - II. The Lovely Alda
- Op. 35 Romance for Violoncello and Orchestra (1888)
- Op. 42 First Suite (1891–1893) I. In a Haunted Forest - II. Summer Idyl - III. In October - IV. The Shepherdess' Song - V. Forest Spirits
- Op. 48 Second ("Indian") Suite (1897) I. Legend - II. Love Song - III. In War-time - IV. Dirge - V. Village Festival

Published songs

- Op. 3 Love and Time and The Rose and the Gardener, for male chorus (1897) (as Edgar Thorn)
- Op. 5 The Witch, for male chorus (1898) (as Edgar Thorn)
- Op. 6 War Song, for male chorus (1898) (as Edgar Thorn)
- Op. 9 Two Old Songs, for voice and piano (1894) I. Deserted - II. Slumber Song
- Op. 11 and 12 An Album of Five Songs, for voice and piano (1883) I. My Love and I - II. You Love Me Not - III. In the Skies - IV. Night-Song - V. Bands of Roses
- Op. 26 From an Old Garden, for voice and piano (1887) I. The Pansy - II. The Myrtle - III. The Clover - IV. The Yellow Daisy - V. The Blue Bell - VI. The Mignonette
- Op. 27 Three Songs, for male chorus (1890) I. In the Starry Sky Above Us - II. Springtime - III. The Fisherboy
- Op. 33 Three Songs, for voice and piano (1894) I. Prayer - II. Cradle Hymn - III. Idyl
- Op. 34 Two Songs, for voice and piano (1889) I. Menie - II. My Jean
- Op. 40 Six Love Songs, for voice and piano (1890) I. Sweet, Blue-eyed Maid - II. Sweetheart, Tell Me - III. Thy Beaming Eyes - IV. For Love's Sweet Sake - V. O Lovely Rose - VI. I Ask but This
- Op. 41 Two Songs, for male chorus (1890) I. Cradle Song - II. Dance of the Gnomes
- Op. 43 Two Northern Songs, for mixed chorus (1891) I. The Brook - II. Slumber Song
- Op. 44 Barcarolle, for mixed chorus with four-hand piano accompaniment (1892)
- Op. 47 Eight Songs, for voice and piano (1893) I. The Robin Sings in the Apple Tree - II. Midsummer Lullaby - III. Folk Song - IV. Confidence - V. The West Wind Croons in the Cedar Trees - VI. In the Woods - VII. The Sea - VIII. Through the Meadow
- Two Songs from the Thirteenth Century, for male chorus (1897) I. Winter Wraps his Grimmest Spell - II. As the Gloaming Shadows Creep
- Op. 52 Three Choruses, for male voices (1897) I. Hush, hush! - II. From the Sea - III. The Crusaders
- Op. 53 Two Choruses, for male voices (1898) I. Bonnie Ann - II. The Collier Lassie
- Op. 54 Two Choruses, for male voices (1898) I. A Ballad of Charles the Bold - II. Midsummer Clouds
- Op. 56 Four Songs, for voice and piano (1898) I. Long Ago - II. The Swan Bent Low to the Lily - III. A Maid Sings Light - IV. As the Gloaming Shadows Creep
- Op. 58 Three Songs, for voice and piano (1899) I. Constancy - II. Sunrise - III. Merry Maiden Spring
- Op. 60 Three Songs, for voice and piano (1902) I. Tyrant Love - II. Fair Springtide - III. To the Golden Rod
- Summer Wind, for women's voices (1902)
- Two College Songs, for women's voices (1907) I. Alma Mater - II. At Parting

== Selected recordings ==
- Piano Concerto No. 2: Van Cliburn, Chicago Symphony Orchestra, Walter Hendl (1960)
- Piano Concerto No. 1 and Piano Concerto No. 2: Donna Amato, London Philharmonic Orchestra, Paul Freeman (1985)
- Woodland Sketches, Op.51, Sea Pieces, Op.55, Fireside Tales, Op.61, New England Idyls, Op.62: James Barbagallo (1993)
- Piano Sonata No.4 "Keltic", Op.59, Forgotten Fairytales, Op.4, Six poems after Heine, Op.31, Twelve Virtuoso Studies, Op.46 : James Barbagallo
- Étude de Concert, Op.36, Second Modern Suite, Op.14, Serenata, Op.16, Two Fantasy Pieces, Op.17, Twelve Études, Op.39 : James Barbagallo
- Piano Music by Edward MacDowell, Sandra Carlock (2005)
- Heroic Tales: Piano Music of Edward MacDowell, Fred Karpoff (2002)

== See also ==
- New Hampshire Historical Marker No. 206: The MacDowell Graves

== Bibliography ==
- Gilman, Lawrence: Edward MacDowell: A Study (New York, 1909; reprint N.Y., 1969).
- Baltzell, W. J. (ed.): Critical and Historical Essays: Lectures Delivered at Columbia University by Edward MacDowell (Boston, 1912).
- Sonneck, Oscar: Catalogue of First Editions of Edward MacDowell (Washington D.C.: Library of Congress, 1917).
- Humiston, W. H.: Edward MacDowell (New York, 1921).
- Porte, John F.: Edward Macdowell: A Great American Tone Poet, His Life and Music (New York, 1922).
- Lowens, Margery Morgan: The New York Years of Edward MacDowell (Ph.D. diss., University of Michigan, 1971).
- Levy, Alan H.: Edward MacDowell, an American Master (Lanham, MD: Scarecrow Press, 1998).
- Bomberger, E. Douglas: MacDowell (New York: Oxford University Press, 2013); ISBN 9780199899296.
