= Azara (opera) =

English-language American opera in three acts by John Knowles Paine

- Opera by John Knowles Paine
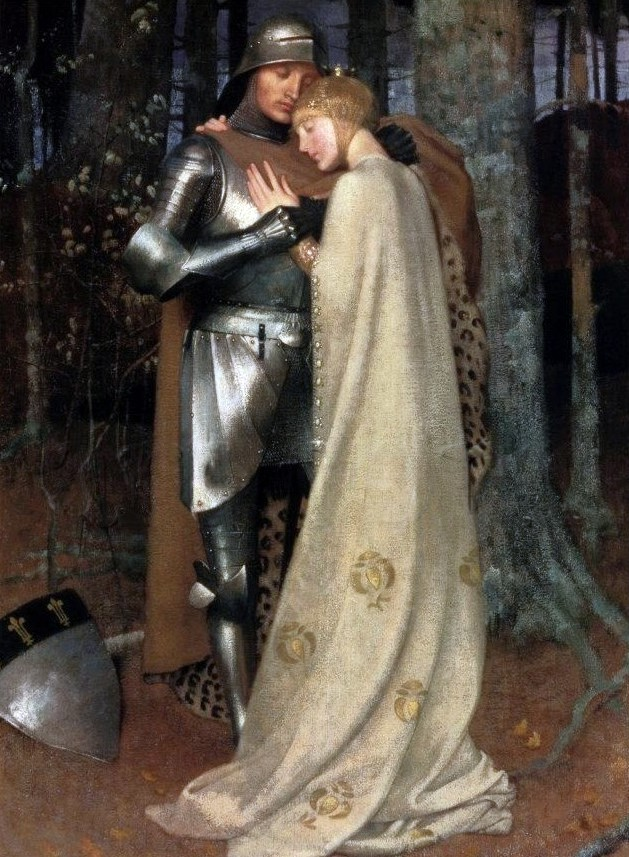
- Aucassin and Nicolette by Marianne Stokes (1905)
- Librettist: Paine
- Language: English
- Based on: Aucassin and Nicolette (12th–13th century)
- Premiere: 7 May 1903; Chickering Hall, Boston

Azara is an English-language American opera in three acts with music and libretto by John Knowles Paine. It is based on an anonymous Middle French story, Aucassin and Nicolette. Paine began work on Azara in 1883 and finished it in 1898.

A drama set in Provence in the Middle Ages, Azara "confronts daughter with guardian, son with father, and pursuer with fugitive." The Cambridge Companion to Grand Opera said the plot "is a classic conflict between Christians and Muslims, with the requisite opposing choruses, and a private story is set against the political background although the two spheres are never truly integrated."

The work premiered in 1903 in a concert version at Chickering Hall in Boston. Azara has never been fully staged. Paine's biographer wrote that Azara was "the supreme effort of his life and caused him the greatest disappointment in its failure to reach production."

== Synopsis ==
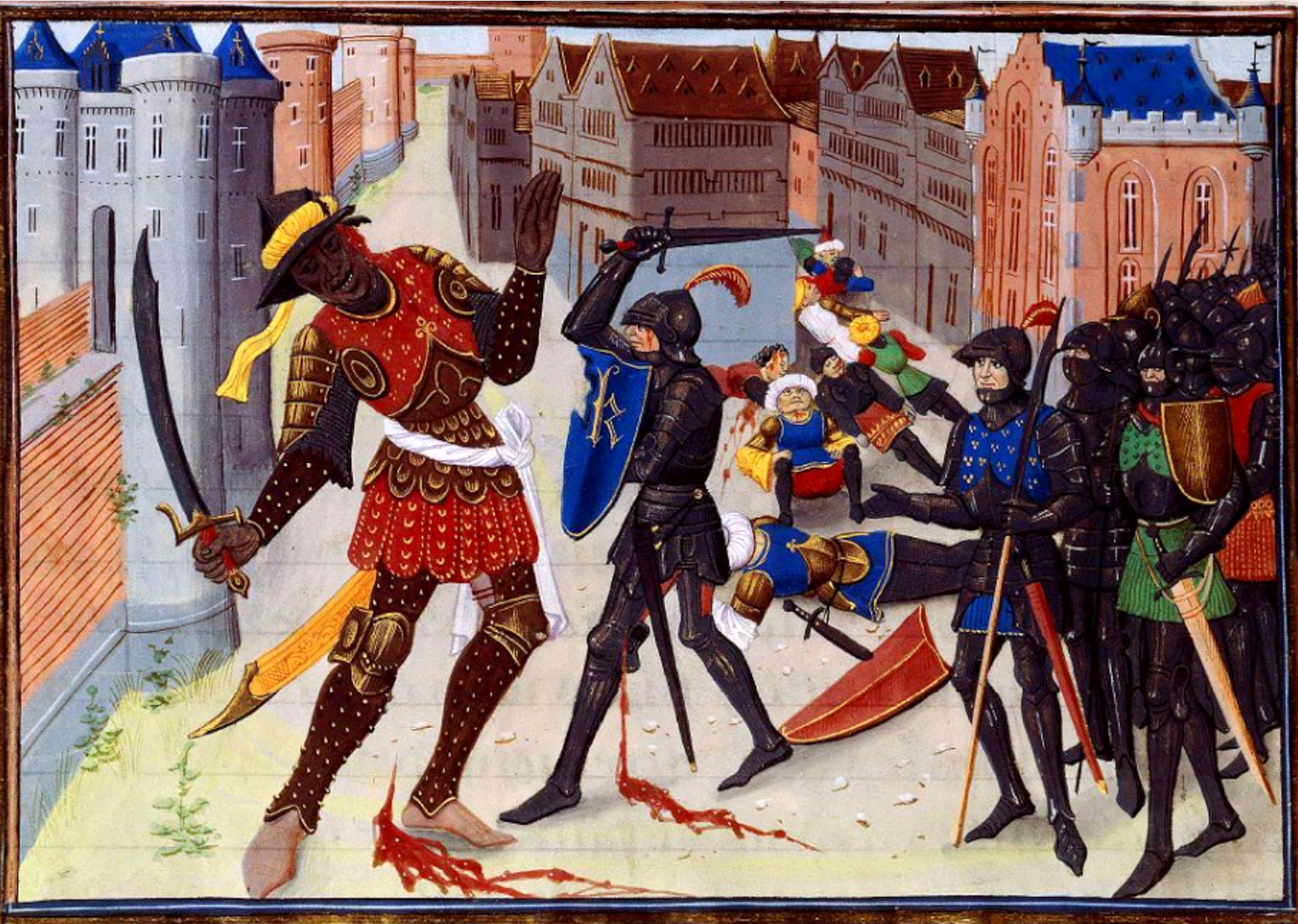
The French knight Maugis fighting the Saracens (15th century)

Setting: Provence, around the time of the First Crusade.

=== Act I ===
Interior of Rainulf's castle.

Rainulf, king of Provence, awaits news of the battle between his forces, led by the king's son Gontran, against a Saracen army led by Mälek. Count Odo, a page, enters with news of Gontran's victory.

Rainulf notices the beautiful Azara, a Moorish girl who is the ward of Count Aymar, one of the king's vassals. Rainulf decides he wants to possess Azara. Gontran enters and announces his triumph and that he will marry Azara, to whom he has secretly been betrothed.

The king claims that Azara was pledged in a dynastic marriage in Spain. The king's knights argue it is improper for a prince to marry a non-Christian. Azara's guardian, Count Aymar, tells the king he found Azara on the battlefield when she was a child; even though she was born a Moorish princess, she has been baptized and raised as a Christian.

Rainulf is angered. He orders Aymar and Azara to leave his sight and orders his son to depart for Spain. Gontran, furious that his father would thwart his marriage, brings in Mälek, returns his sword, and frees him. Amid fighting between the courtiers, Mälek disappears. Gontran and his father argue. Gontran alludes to Rainulf's past sins. The king disowns Gontran.

=== Act II ===
A forest glade near the sea at night.

Aymar and Azara have fled the castle and are preparing to go into exile. Garcie and Colas, shepherds, enter with the huntsman. They report that Gontran has fled the castle and is in the forest looking for Azara. The group sets off to find Gontran and encounters Mälek, who is struck by the resemblance between Azara and his caliph's wife. He realizes Azara must be the princess who was captured years before. He begs Azara to flee with him. Azara refuses and threatens to kill herself when Mälek insists she accompany him. Hearing Gontran approach, Mälek flees.

Gontran and Azara are joyful to be reunited. Rainulf and his retinue enter. The king offers to forgive his son if he will give up Azara so the king may have her. Gontran refuses. Drawing his sword, Gontran announces Rainulf had murdered the queen and looted the Holy Sepulchre in Jerusalem. He presents a document from Rome in which the pope has excommunicated the king.

Mälek returns with his army, surrounding Gontran, Rainulf, and Azara. The Saracens seize Azara and wound Rainulf. The king begs forgiveness of his son and dies. Gontran and Aymar watch the Saracens sail off, singing of their victory.

=== Act III ===
A year later, near the moat of Rainulf's castle, now Gontran's.

King Gontran laments Azara's fate. Aymar reassures him that as Azara was the caliph's daughter, Mälek would not have harmed her. Cheered by that, Gontran announces that he will participate in the May Day festivities. Courtiers, townspeople, minstrels, musicians, and dancers appear and begin the celebrations. One of the minstrels is Mälek in disguise. He laments Azara's escape from Spain to return to Gontran. He notices another minstrel, who is Azara in disguise. She approaches Gontran. When asked to sing, she tells her story of love, capture, and escape. Azara throws off her mantle. Mälek advances and tries to stab her. Gontran stops him and takes his knife. Mälek is filled with remorse and begs Azara to forgive him. He pulls out a second knife and stabs himself to death. Gontran and Azara embrace.

== Composition ==
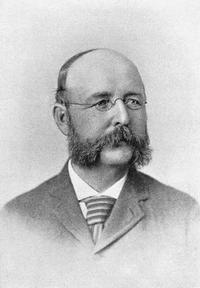
John Knowles Paine

Paine was a pioneering American composer who was known internationally, "the best composer of his time and the only one who attempted classical works". Rupert Hughes said, "before Mr. Paine there had never been an American music writer worthy of serious consideration." In 1875, Paine was appointed a professor of music at Harvard College, the first music professor at any U.S. university.

Paine began work on Azara in spring 1883. He focused his energies on the opera and his output of other musical compositions dropped off. William Dean Howells and Thomas Bailey Aldrich, editors of The Atlantic Monthly, offered to draft a libretto, but Paine declined and wrote it himself. Theodore Thomas, who had premiered Paine's Symphony No. 1 in 1876, offered to produce Azara through the new American Opera Company, but the company collapsed before it was produced. After 15 years of work, the opera was finished in 1898. Walter Spalding, a fellow music professor at Harvard, said Paine's "words and music show genius of the highest order" with "striking harmonies and melodies, masterly orchestration, dramatic power and picturesque scenic features." Paine intended the title role for soprano Emma Eames; like Paine, she was a Mainer.

Azara has a running time of three hours. The score calls for three flutes, a piccolo, two oboes, an English horn, two clarinets, a bass clarinet, three bassoons, four horns, three trumpets, two trombones, a bass trombone, tuba, tambourine, timpani, bass drum, cymbals, triangle and strings. The work is "strongly suggestive" of Richard Wagner. Many American operas of the time emulated the style and structural approach of Wagner's works, particularly Der Ring des Nibelungen. Like Wagner, Paine created leitmotifs for his characters.

The libretto was published in 1898. In 1901 Breitkopf & Härtel published the libretto in both English and German. The score was priced at $5. A full score was published by Breitkopf & Härtel in 1908.

Upon publication of the vocal score, one magazine observed that it was unlikely the opera would be performed in Paine's lifetime as American opera companies had a "No American need apply" policy. A review in The Concert-goer found it old-fashioned, a "conventional opera of the old sort, in which the drama is nothing, the words excuses for a soprano solo here, a duet there, a grand ensemble of soloists and chorus at the end of each act. Such writing may have been very attractive fifty years ago, but to-day from a man who has felt the influence of Wagner and Verdi, we expect something different."

== Performances ==
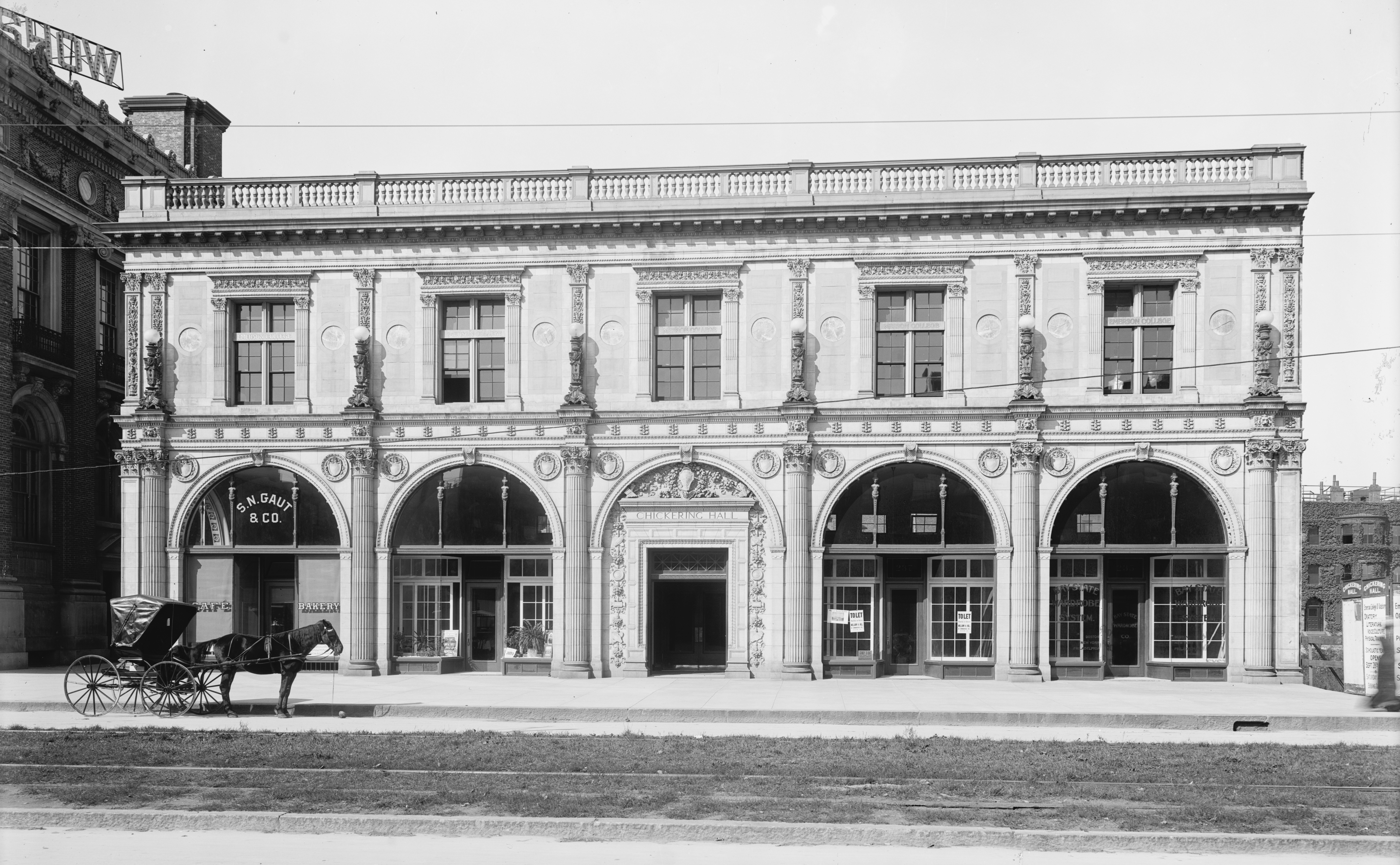
Chickering Hall, site of the 1903 premiere

Under conductor Wilhelm Gericke, the Boston Symphony Orchestra performed "Three Moorish Dances," a suite from Azara, in two concerts on May 9 and 10, 1900. Philip Hale, the critic for the Boston Herald, observed "the dances were heartily applauded" and that it was "a pity that a serious opera by an American composer of established reputation should not first see footlights in the land of his birth. Walter Damrosch was luckier with his 'Scarlet Letter'; he had his own opera company, but it is not every composer who can afford this luxury." The critic for the Boston Evening Transcript, William Foster Apthorp, said Azara was a work for which "our cognoscenti have been smacking their lips for some time; it has been a curious experience to know that an American opera was gradually growing into completeness for years out there in quiet, academic Cambridge." The dances were "bright and fascinating . . . brilliant and sparkling." Theodore Thomas led the Chicago Symphony Orchestra in a performance of the "Moorish Dances" in October 1900. Paine's publishers issued the sheet music of the "Three Moorish Dances."

Azara was given a concert performance at Boston's Chickering Hall on May 7, 1903. Ephraim Cutter, Jr., and Paine accompanied the singers on piano; there was no orchestra. Apthorp in the Transcript said Azara was Paine's best work: "one wishes more than ever that one could hear the whole work, given as it should be, on the actual stage."

For several years, there were reports that the Metropolitan Opera or a company in Germany would stage Azara. For example, the Boston Evening Transcript reported in June 1905 that a production by the Metropolitan Opera under its general manager Heinrich Conried was expected in the following season. That fall, The New Music Review said Conried was willing to produce the opera "if he can get the company to study it." A 1907 report said Conried attempted to stage Azara that year but the Met was unable to find enough singers familiar with the English language in order to cast the demanding solo parts. Conried also said the chorus of his company would not learn English-language lyrics. The Providence Journal in 1907 editorialized about the "vague promises of Direktor Conried and others" for the staging of Azara. Charles Sumner Hamlin, a Boston attorney who served as the first chairman of the Federal Reserve, wrote President Theodore Roosevelt about Hamlin's efforts to lobby both Andrew Dickson White, American ambassador to Germany, and the German ambassador to the United States to have Azara performed in Berlin; Hamlin asked Roosevelt to raise the matter with Prince Henry of Prussia, brother of Emperor Wilhelm II, during the prince's visit to the United States.

A second concert version of Azara was performed on April 9, 1907, a year after Paine's death, at Symphony Hall in Boston by the Celia Society of Boston with an orchestra conducted by Benjamin Johnson Lang. The cast included Alice May Bates Rice in the title role and Bertha Cushing Child as Odo. Musical America wrote, "there are several remarkably brilliant orchestral effects" and that Azara was "a work of great merit."

Just before Paine's death, an article in The Etude asserted "the first performance of this work, which must surely come soon, will be another peak in our musical history."

== Roles ==
Roles, voice types, 1903 concert premiere, 1907 concert version
Role	Voice type	Chickering Hall, 1903 Director: Ephraim Cutter, Jr.	Symphony Hall, 1907 Conductor: Benjamin Johnson Lang
Rainulf, King of Provence	bass	Ralph E. Brown	H.F. Merrill
	tenor	Ernest R. Leeman	George Deane
Azara, ward of Aymar	soprano	Rebecca W. Cutter/Grace Lowell Bradbury	Alice Bates Rice
Aymar, count & vassal of Rainulf	baritone	David Tobey/George A. Tyler	Earl Cartwright
Odo, count & royal page	mezzo-soprano	Mrs. Vincent Lyman	Bertha Cushing Child
Mälek, a Saracen chief	baritone	David Tobey	Stephen Townsend
Garcie, shepherdess	mezzo-soprano	Rebecca W. Cutter	Rebecca Howe (Note: This is the same person as Rebecca Cutter.)
Colas, shepherd	contralto	Mrs. Albert Thorndike	Adelaide Griggs
Huntsman	tenor	Ernest R. Leeman	James Rattigan

== See also ==
- Aucassin et Nicolette, ou Les moeurs du bon vieux tems, 1779 French opera by André Grétry.
- Aucassin et Nicolette, 1909 French opera by Paul Le Flem.
