= George Martin Lane =

American classical philologist

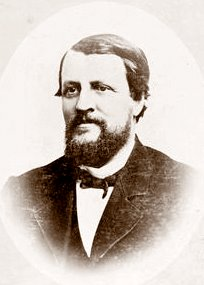
Lane c. 1868–1875

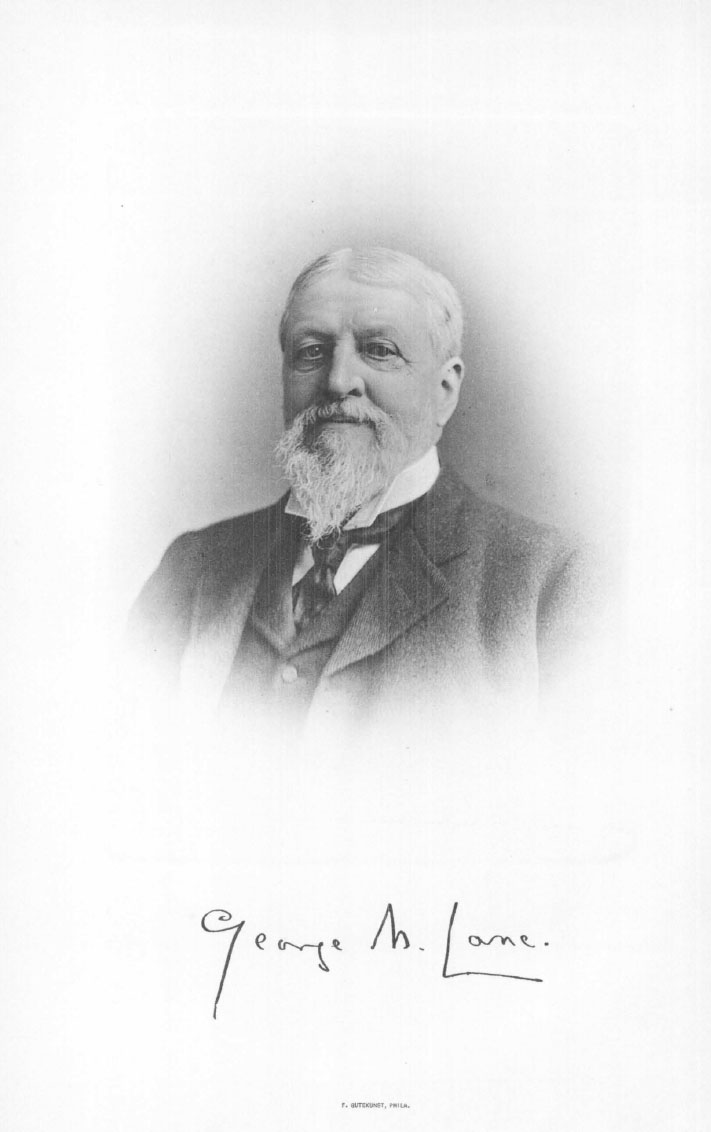
Later illustration of Lane

George Martin Lane (December 24, 1823 – June 30, 1897) was an American scholar.

== Life and career ==
Lane was born in Charlestown, Massachusetts. He graduated in 1846 from Harvard, and from 1847 to 1851 studied at the universities of Berlin, Bonn, Heidelberg, and Göttingen. In 1851, he received his doctorate at Göttingen for his dissertation Smyrnaeorum Res Gestae et Antiquitates and upon returning to America was appointed university professor of Latin at Harvard College.

From 1869 until 1894, when he resigned and became professor emeritus, he was Pope Professor of Latin in the same institution. His Latin Pronunciation, which led to the rejection of the English method of Latin pronunciation in the United States, was published in 1871.

His Latin Grammar, completed and published by Professor Morris H. Morgan in the following year, is of high value. Lane's assistance in the preparation of Harper's Latin lexicons was also invaluable. He wrote English light verse with humor and fluency, and two of his efforts, "Jonah" or "In the Black Whale at Ascalon" and "The Ballad of the Lone Fish Ball", became famous as songs after being set to music.

Upon Lane's retirement in 1894, Harvard granted him an honorary degree as well as the first pension it had ever granted a faculty member which, according to Lane, was enough to support him for the rest of his life.

== "The Lone Fish Ball" ==
In 1855, while living at Cloverden in Cambridge, Massachusetts, Lane wrote the song "The Lone Fish Ball"; after decades as a staple of Harvard undergraduates, it was modernized into the popular hit "One Meat Ball". The song is set to the tune of an old song titled "Sipping Cider Through a Straw".

According to Morgan, the song is based upon an actual experience of Lane's at a restaurant in Boston, although the reality involved a half-portion of macaroni, rather than a fish ball. The song goes on to relate the impoverished diner's embarrassment at the hands of a disdainful waiter. After becoming popular among Harvard undergraduates, it was translated into a mock Italian operetta, Il Pesceballo, by faculty members Francis James Child, James Russell Lowell and John Knowles Paine, set to a pastiche of grand opera music and performed in Boston and Cambridge to raise funds for the Union Army. A fish ball, in New England, was fish and potatoes, pan fried together for breakfast.

In 1944, the song was revived by Tin Pan Alley songwriters Hy Zaret and Lou Singer in a more bluesy format as "One Meat Ball" and popularized by Tony Pastor: The recording by Josh White later became one of the biggest hits of the early part of the American folk music revival. Over the years, it was recorded by Candy Candido, the Andrews Sisters, Bing Crosby, Jimmy Savo, Lightnin' Hopkins, Lonnie Donegan, Dave Van Ronk, Ry Cooder, Washboard Jungle, Tom Paxton, Shinehead, Ann Rabson, Calvin Russell, Josh White, among others.
