= Aucassin et Nicolette (Le Flem opera) =

Shadow puppet play

Aucassin et Nicolette is a shadow puppet opera in a prologue and three acts by Paul Le Flem after the medieval "chantefable" Aucassin et Nicolette.

The music was first presented in private at the home of Pierre Aubry on 19 May 1909, then given a first public performance with medieval themed "ombres" – Chinese shadows – by Géo Dorival on 11 February 1910. The music was not presented as a fully staged opera until 1924 at the Théâtre Bériza, with Marguerite Bériza herself singing Nicolette and costumes by Ladislas Medgyes.

In Le Flem's music, the medieval theme is complemented by references to Breton music.

== See also ==
- Aucassin et Nicolette, ou Les moeurs du bon vieux tems, 1779 French opera by André Grétry based on the same source material.
- Azara, a 1903 American opera by John Knowles Paine based on the same source material.
