= Aucassin et Nicolette (Grétry opera) =

French opéra comique by André Grétry

Title page of the libretto

Aucassin et Nicolette, ou Les moeurs du bon vieux tems (Aucassin and Nicolette, or The Customs of the Good Old Days) is a French opéra comique by André Grétry. It takes the form of a comédie mise en musique in four acts. The work was first performed by the Comédie-Italienne at the Palace of Versailles on 30 December 1779 and subsequently at the Hôtel de Bourgogne in Paris on 3 January 1780. It was also revived in 1782 in a version reduced to three acts.

The libretto is by Michel-Jean Sedaine, after the early medievalist Jean-Baptiste de La Curne de Sainte-Palaye's Les amours du bon vieux tems, a modernised version of the Old French chantefable Aucassin et Nicolette.

== Roles ==
| Role | Voice type | Première cast, 30 December 1779 (Conductor: - ) |
|---|---|---|
| Aucassin | tenor | Jean-Baptiste Guignard, called M Clairval |
| Garins, comte de Beaucaire | basse-taille (bass-baritone) | Philippe-Thomas Ménier |
| Bongars, comte de Valence | basse-taille | M Suin |
| Vicomte de Beaucaire | tenor | Jean-René Lecoupay de la Rosière |
| A shepherd | basse-taille | Pierre-Marie Narbonne |
| Comte de Beaucaire's officials | tenors | Charles-Nicolas-Joseph-Justin Favart; M. Dorgeville |
| Aucassin's page | spoken | Jacques Béron, called M d'Orsonville |
| Marcou (first soldier) | tenor | Guillaume-Adrien-Antoine Visentini, called M Thomassin |
| Bredau (second soldier) | basse-taille | M. Darville |
| Nicolette | soprano | Louise-Rosalie Lefebvre, called Mme Dugazon |
| Eudelinde | soprano | Françoise Carpentier, called Mme Gonthier |

== Synopsis ==
=== Act 1 ===
Aucassin and Nicolette are deeply in love but Aucassin's father, Count Garins, opposes their marriage because Nicolette's parentage is unknown. When his arch-enemy Count Bongars attacks his castle, Garins asks his son for help. Aucassin agrees on condition he is allowed to see Nicolette again. He fights and takes Bongars captive but his father refuses to fulfill his part of the bargain. When Aucassin angrily responds by freeing Bongars and encouraging him to keep fighting Garins, Garins has Aucassin sent to prison.

=== Act 2 ===
Both Nicolette and Aucassin are in separate prison cells. She manages to escape using a rope ladder but is unable to reach Aucassin's window. The guards, Marcou and Bredau, are sympathetic to her plight and allow her to flee to the neighbouring forest. When Garins fails to track Nicolette down, he concludes she will die in the forest anyway so there is no further point keeping Aucassin under lock and key. A shepherd brings Aucassin a secret message from Nicolette and he sets off for the forest to meet her. Bongars then arrives to make peace with Garins. He has discovered Nicolette is really his daughter and is anxious to find her.

=== Act 3 ===
Nicolette is alone in the forest when the shepherd and then Aucassin arrive. Aucassin does not yet know the news about Nicolette's parentage and believes his father still opposes their marriage. Aucassin says he would rather die than abandon her. Garins and the rest of his party find the lovers and surround them. Aucassin swears he will kill himself rather than surrender, but he is told the truth about Nicolette's birth and, with this misconception cleared up, the lovers are free to marry.

== See also ==
- Aucassin et Nicolette, 1909 French opera by Paul Le Flem based on the same source material.
- Azara, a 1903 American opera by John Knowles Paine based on the same source material.

== Sources ==
- Michel Brenet Grétry: sa vie et ses œuvres (F. Hayez, 1884)
- David Charlton Grétry and the Growth of Opéra Comique (Cambridge University Press, 1986)
- Ronald Lessens Grétry ou Le triomphe de l'Opéra-Comique (L'Harmattan, 2007)
- Period libretto: Aucassin et Nicolette, ou Les Mœurs du bon vieux tems. Comédie, En quatre Actes, en Vers, melée d'Ariettes, Paris, Didot, 1789 (accessible for free online at Google Books)
- Period printed score of the 3-act version (1782): Aucassin et Nicolette ou les Moeurs du bon vieux Tems. Comédie en trois Actes, Paris, Huguet, s.d. (accessible for free online at Internet Archive
- The Oxford Dictionary of Opera, by John Warrack and Ewan West (1992), 782 pages, ISBN 0-19-869164-5
