= The American Rattle Snake =

1782 American political cartoon

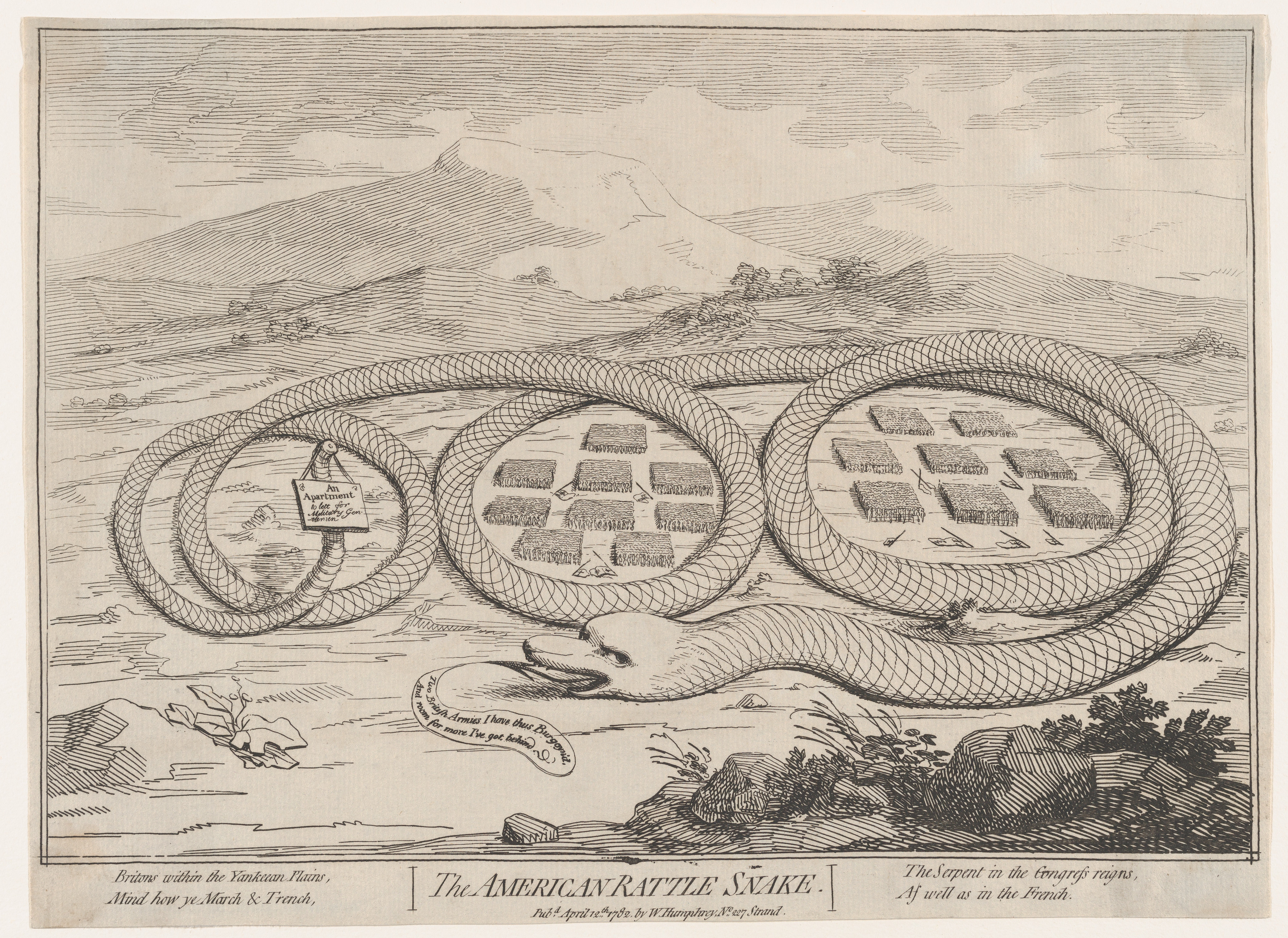
- Artist: James Gillray
- Year: 1782
- Medium: Etching
- Subject: Rattlesnake
- Dimensions: 8.5 by 12.5 in (22 by 32 cm)
- Location: Metropolitan Museum of Art, New York

The American Rattle Snake is a political cartoon drawn by English cartoonist James Gillray and published by William Richardson on April 12, 1782. One of Gillray's earliest prints, it depicts a rattlesnake, symbolizing America, coiled around two British armies. It was donated to the Metropolitan Museum of Art by William Henry Huntington in 1883 but is not available to be viewed.

== Description ==
The cartoon references the siege of Yorktown in 1781, where Franco-American troops surrounded a British army under Charles Cornwallis, causing him to surrender. The snake symbolizes America, as the Americans had previously used the reptile on the Gadsden flag, making it an early emblem of the US.

Text on the snake's tongue states "Two British Armies I have thus Burgoyn'd, And room for more I've got behind." Its tail holds up a sign saying "An Apartment to let for Military Gentlemen."

== See also ==
- Join, or Die, a political cartoon that also features a rattlesnake
