= Alice Rice =

Alice Rice may refer to:

- Alice Hegan Rice, American novelist
- Alice May Bates Rice, American soprano
