= Aucassin and Nicolette =

Anonymous mediaeval French fictional story

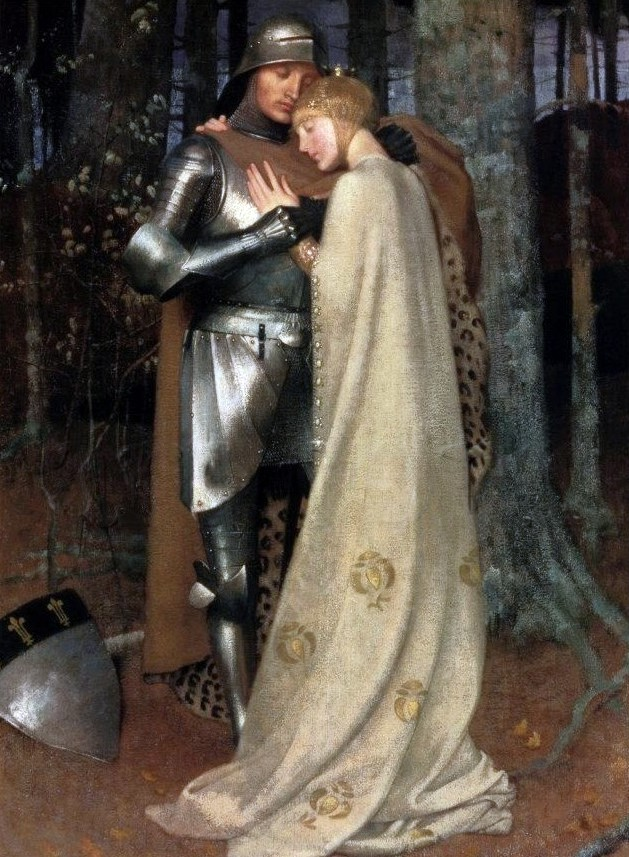
Aucassin and Nicolette, 19th-century oil-on-canvas by Marianne Stokes

Aucassin et Nicolette (12th or 13th century) is an anonymous medieval French fictional story. It is the unique example of a chantefable, literally, a "sung story", a combination of prose and verse (similar to a prosimetrum).

== History ==
The work probably dates from the late 12th or early 13th century, and is known from only one surviving manuscript, discovered in 1752 by medievalist Jean-Baptiste de La Curne de Sainte-Palaye (BnF, Fonds Français 2168).

Stylistically, the chantefable combines elements of many Old French genres, such as the chanson de geste (e.g., The Song of Roland), lyric poems, and courtly novels—literary forms already well-established by the 12th century. Aucassin et Nicolette is the only known chantefable, the term itself having been derived from the story's concluding lines: "No cantefable prent fin" ("Our chantefable is drawing to a close").

== Plot summary ==
The story begins with a song which serves as prologue; and then prose takes up the narrative. It recounts the tale of Aucassin, son of Count Garin of Beaucaire, who so loved Nicolette, a Saracen maiden, who had been sold to the Viscount of Beaucaire, baptized and adopted by him, that he had forsaken knighthood and chivalry and even refused to defend his father's territories from enemies. Accordingly, his father ordered the Viscount to send Nicolette away, but instead the Viscount locked her in a tower of his palace. Aucassin is imprisoned by his father to prevent him from going after his beloved Nicolette. But Nicolette escapes, hears Aucassin lamenting in his cell, and comforts him with sweet words. She flees to the forest outside the gates, and there, in order to test Aucassin's fidelity, builds a rustic home to await his arrival. When he is released from prison Aucassin hears from shepherd lads of Nicolette's hiding-place, and seeks her bower. The lovers, united, resolve to leave the country. They board a ship and are driven to the (fictional) kingdom of "Torelore", whose king they find in child-bed while the queen is with the army. After a three years' stay in Torelore they are captured by Saracen pirates and separated. The wind blows Aucassin's boat back to Beaucaire - where he succeeds to Garin's estate. Meanwhile another wind carries Nicolette to "Cartage" (perhaps a play on Carthage or Cartagena). The sight of the city reminds her that she is the daughter of its king. She informs the king and soon it is planned that she should marry a Saracen king. She avoids this by disguising herself as a minstrel. She then sets sail for Beaucaire to rejoin her beloved Aucassin. There, before Aucassin who does not immediately recognize her, she sings of her own adventures and the love between them. Finally, in due time she makes herself known to him, and the two marry. The story ends by saying that now the two have found (lasting) happiness the narrator has nothing left to say.

== Major themes ==
Critics have seen the story as a parody of such genres as the epic, the romance, and the saint's life. "Few Old French genres escape parody in this concise literary encyclopedia." For example, the theme of distant love (amor de lonh), common in Provençal poetry, is reversed: the lady dresses up as a troubadour and seeks out her beloved man. Many of the scenes which seem outwardly comedic, such as the pregnant King (more gender reversal) or wars fought with cheese and apple projectiles (wars are usually fought over food, not with food), are further examples of flipping traditional literary tropes on their heads. Aucassin's speech that he would prefer hell to heaven because hell's inmates are likely to be more entertaining is a play on Saints Lives. Even the names are at odds: "Aucassin" may suggest al-Kassim (sharer) or al-Ghassan (youth), sounding more Saracen than the very Christian "Nicolette". The story and manuscript derive from the bourgeois Arras region in Picardy, not from the aristocratic and courtly environs of Paris. It satirizes courtly love, turning it upside down.

The story was included in Mortimer J. Adler's Gateway to the Great Books (1962) collection, which called it one of the freshest and most delightful "springtime flowers of literature."

== Later mentions ==
Dealt with in Walter Pater's work on "The Renaissance".

The story is mentioned in the Simone de Beauvoir short story "The Age of Discretion".

Scholars note that the story was reworked as the plot of Starlight (French: Étoilette), a French literary fairy tale penned by Marie-Madeleine de Lubert and included in her 1753 revision of Henriette-Julie de Murat's novel, Les Lutins du château de Kernosy (The Sprites of Kernosy Castle, 1710).

The Cloggies performed an English translation of the story in 1971 in Buckland, Oxfordshire.

In 1975, the National Film Board of Canada released a 15-minute animated film of the tale: Aucassin and Nicolette, produced by Wolf Koenig and Guy Glover and directed and animated by the German filmmaker and animation pioneer Lotte Reiniger.

== See also ==
- Aucassin et Nicolette, ou Les moeurs du bon vieux tems, 1779 French opera by André Grétry based on the same source material.
- Azara, a 1903 American opera by John Knowles Paine based on the same source material.
