= Écouves =

- Commune
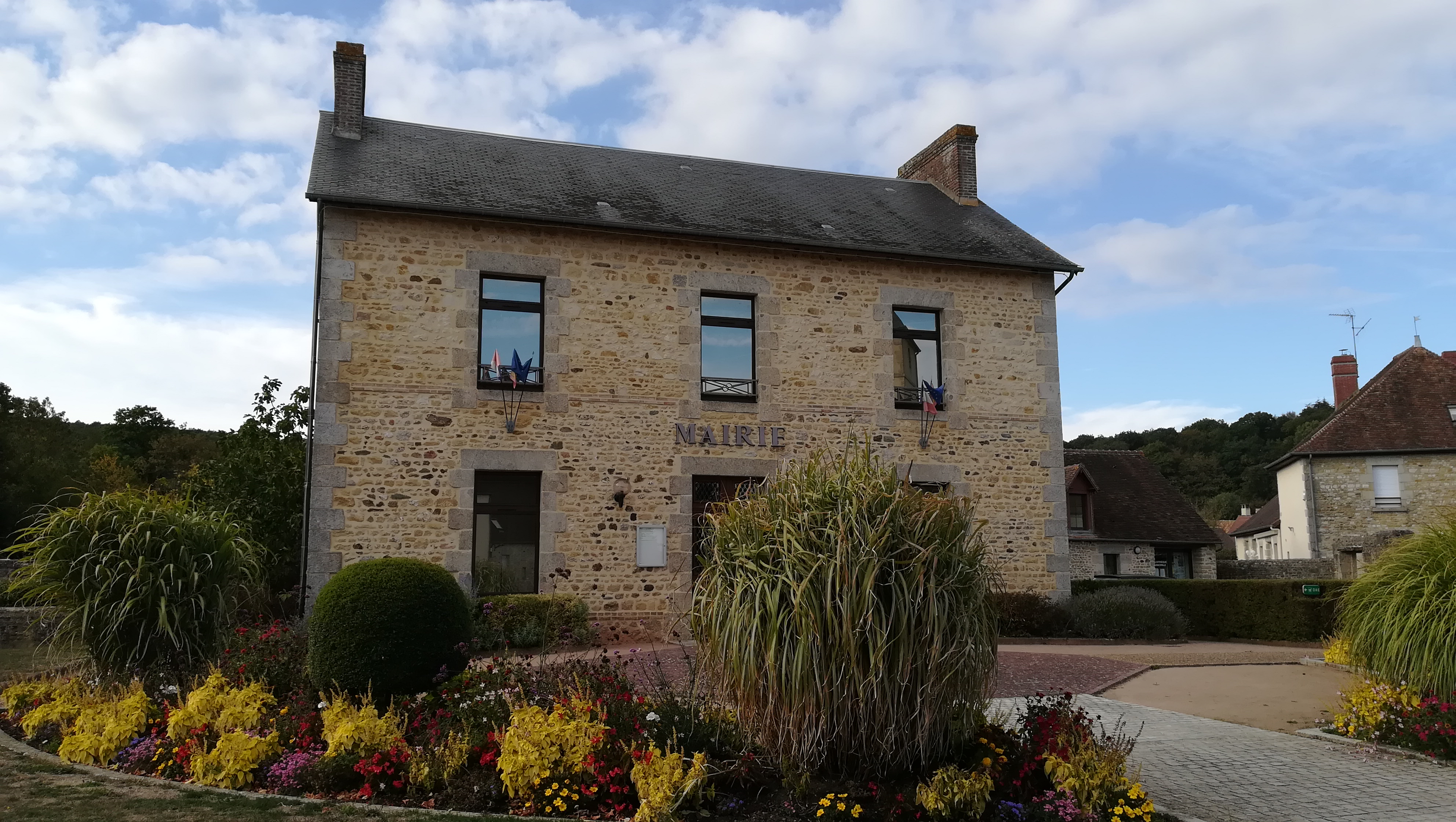
- The town hall in Écouves
- Location of Écouves
- Location within France Location within Normandy
- Coordinates: 48°30′07″N 0°06′18″E
- Country: France
- Region: Normandy
- Department: Orne
- Arrondissement: Alençon
- Canton: Écouves
- Intercommunality: CU Alençon

Government
  - Mayor (2020–2026): Alain Meyer
- Area^{1}: 36.40 km^{2} (14.05 sq mi)
- Population (2023): 1,663
  - Density: 45.69/km^{2} (118.3/sq mi)
- Time zone: UTC+01:00 (CET)
  - Summer (DST): UTC+02:00 (CEST)
- INSEE/Postal code: 61341 /61250
- ^{1} French Land Register data, which excludes lakes, ponds, glaciers > 1 km^{2} (0.386 sq mi or 247 acres) and river estuaries.

Écouves (French pronunciation: [ekuv]) is a commune in the department of Orne, northwestern France. The municipality was established on 1 January 2016 by merger of the former communes of Forges, Radon (the seat) and Vingt-Hanaps. It takes its name from the nearby Forêt d'Écouves.

== Geography ==
The commune is made up of the following collection of villages and hamlets, Les Mézières, Vingt-Hanaps, Les Feugerets, Écouves, Forges and Avoise.

The commune is within the Normandie-Maine Regional Natural Park and Forêt d'Écouves.

La Briante, le Betz and la Forêt are the watercourses that flows through the commune.

== Points of interest ==
=== National heritage sites ===
- Markers of Forêt d'Écouves a set of 80 markers positioned in the 18th century that mark the boundaries of the forest, they were registered as a Monument historique in 1987.

== Notable people ==
- Paul Le Flem (1881 – 1984) a French composer and music critic was born here in Radon.

== See also ==
- Communes of the Orne department
