= Symphony No. 2 (Paine) =

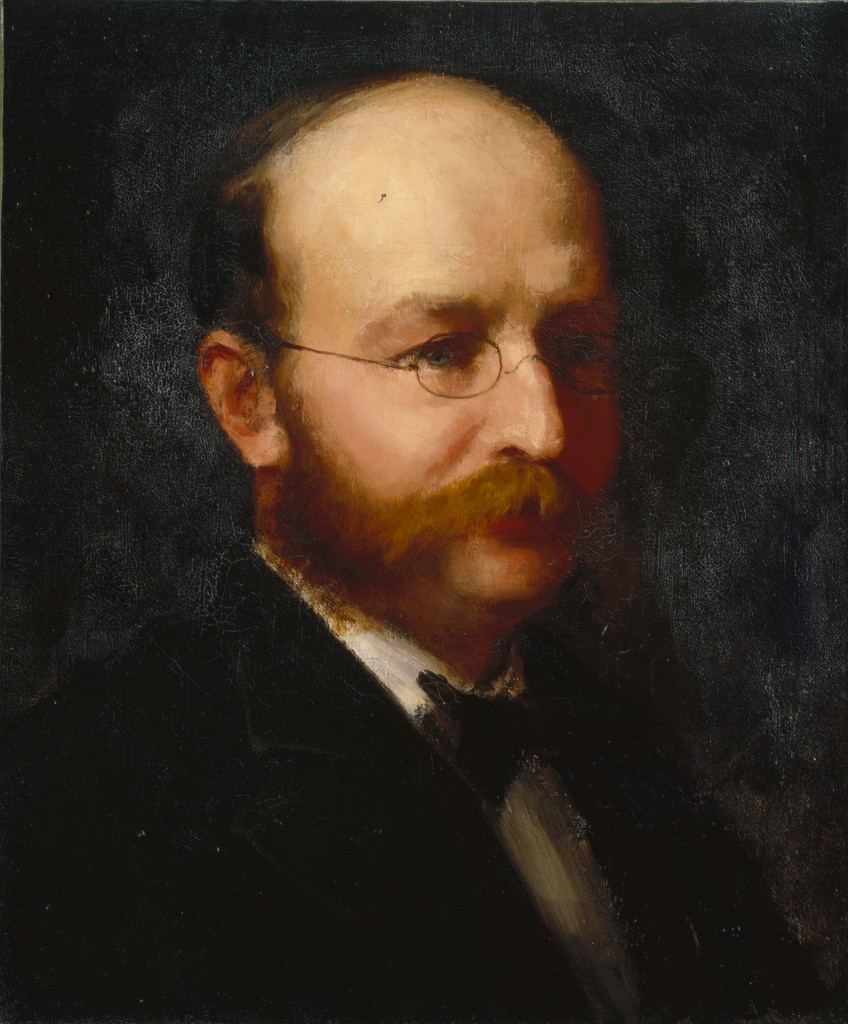
John Knowles Paine by Caroline Cranch c. 1885

Symphony No. 2 in A major, subtitled Im Frühling or In Spring, is the second symphony by American composer John Knowles Paine.

The symphony was composed in 1879 and published in Boston in 1880, at a time when few American composers were able to find publishers for symphonic works. It was also premiered in Boston in 1880, and was extremely well received, prompting handkerchief-waving and shouting at the first performance. Historian Louis Elson compared its final movement to Robert Schumann's Symphony No. 1, which is also subtitled "Spring".

== Instrumentation ==
2 Flutes
2 Oboes
2 A Clarinets
2 Bassoons
4 Horns
2 Trumpets
2 Trombones
1 Bass Trombone
Timpani
Strings

== Structure ==
The symphony is in four movements:

1. Adagio sostenuto – "Departure of Winter" Allegro ma non troppo "Awakening of Nature"
2. Scherzo Allegro "May-Night Fantasy"
3. Adagio "A Romance of Springtime"
4. Allegro giojoso "The Glory of Nature"

== Use in film and television ==
The second and third movements were heard and shown performed at a concert in the fourth episode of the first season of the HBO television series The Gilded Age, depicting a performance in New York City in 1882.
