= Géo Dorival =

French artist (1879–1968)

Justin Marie Georges "Géo" Dorival (Paris, 5 November 1879 - Louveciennes, 22 March 1968) was a French poster artist. He also made glass plates for shadow puppet theatres, such as the 1910 premiere of Aucassin et Nicolette (Le Flem opera).
