= Join, or Die =

American political cartoon used during American Revolution

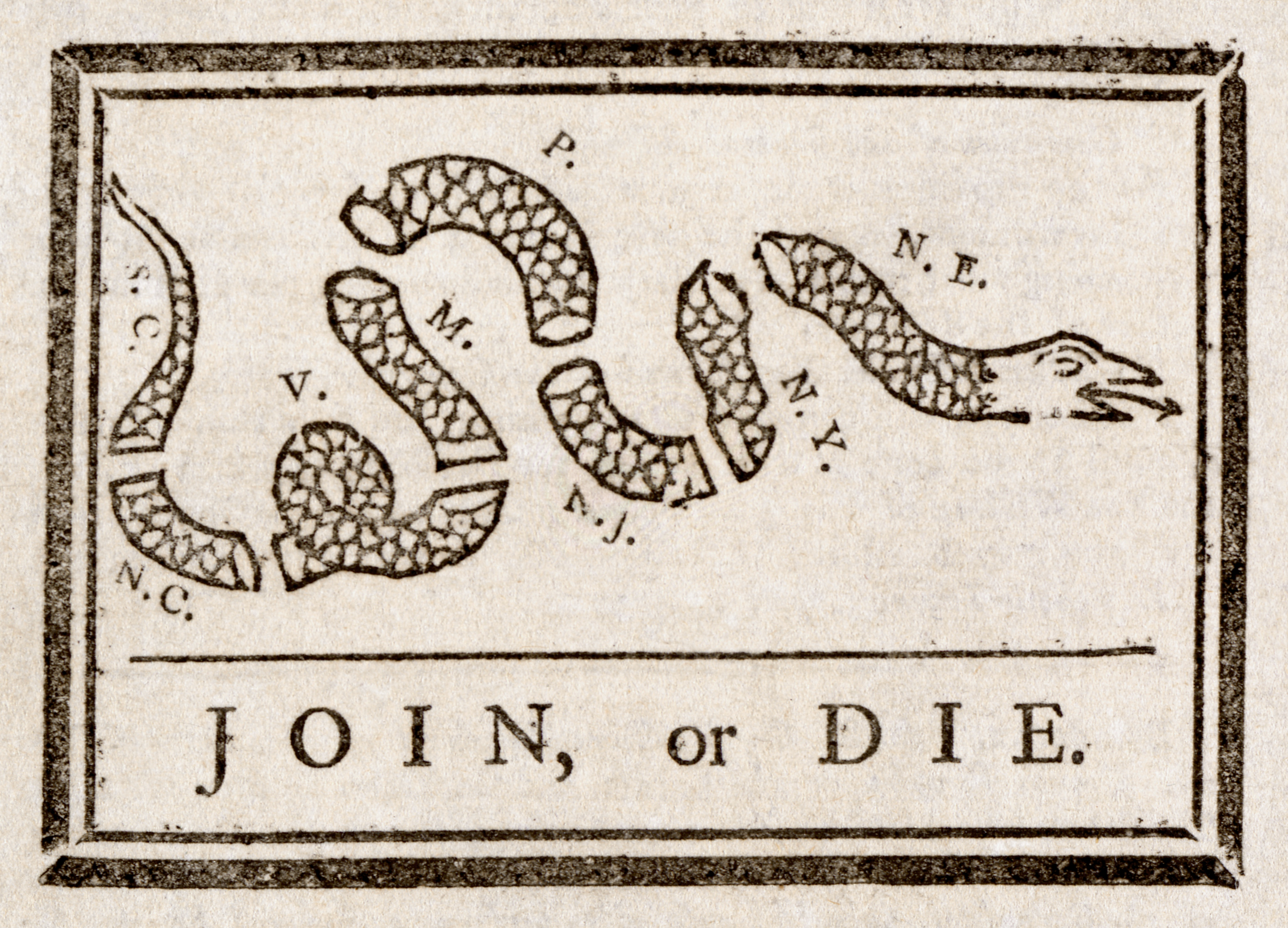
Join, or Die., a 1754 political cartoon by Benjamin Franklin published in The Pennsylvania Gazette in Philadelphia, addresses the disunity of the Thirteen Colonies during the French and Indian War; several decades later, the cartoon resurfaced as one of the most iconic symbols in support of the American Revolution.

Join, or Die. (stylized JOIN, or DIE.) is a political cartoon showing the disunity in the American colonies, originally in the context of the French and Indian War in 1754. Attributed to Benjamin Franklin, the original publication by The Pennsylvania Gazette on May 9, 1754, is the earliest known pictorial representation of colonial union produced by an American colonist in Colonial America. It was based on a superstition that if a snake were cut in pieces and the pieces were put together before sunset, the snake would be resurrected.

The cartoon is a woodcut showing a snake cut into eighths, with each segment labeled with the initials of one of the Thirteen British colonies. New England is represented as one segment and not the four colonies it consisted of at the time (Connecticut, Province of Massachusetts Bay, Province of New Hampshire, and Colony of Rhode Island and Providence Plantations). Delaware Colony, as part of Province of Pennsylvania at the time, was not listed separately, and the Province of Georgia was omitted completely. As a result, it has eight segments of a snake rather than the traditional Thirteen Colonies. The poster focused solely on the colonies that claimed shared identities as Americans. The cartoon appeared along with Franklin's editorial about the "disunited state" of the colonies and helped make his point about the importance of colonial unity. It later became a symbol of colonial freedom during the American Revolutionary War.

== History ==
=== Predecessor ===
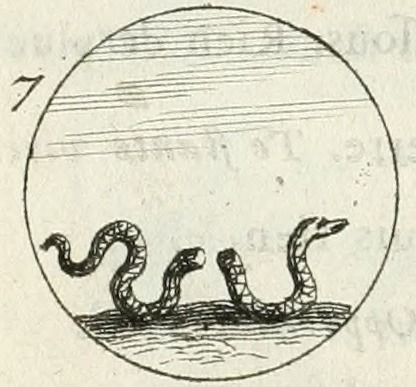
Nicolas Verrien's Se rejoindre ou mourir (1685)

Franklin was possibly inspired by an engraving of French emblem designer Nicolas Verrien which appeared in his 1685 Livre Curieux et utile pour les sçavans et artistes ("Curious and useful book for scientists and artists"). It features a snake cut in two with the legend Un serpent coupé en deux. Se rejoindre ou mourir. ("A snake cut in two. Join or die."). Verrien's snake is part of a collection of "Latin, Spanish, and Italian mottos and emblems", which suggests that the device has an earlier origin.

=== Seven Years' War ===
The French and Indian War was a part of the Seven Years' War which pitted Great Britain alongside the Thirteen Colonies and their native allies against the French, New France, and their native allies. Many American colonists wished to gain control over the lands west of the Appalachian Mountains and settle there (or make profits from speculating on new settlements). During the outbreak of the war, the American colonists were divided on whether or not to take the risk of actually fighting the French for control of the lands west of the Appalachian Mountains. The poster quickly became a symbol for the need of organized action against the threat posed by the French and their native allies during the conflict, as while many Americans were unwilling to participate in combat against the French, many more recognized that if the French colonies were not captured they would always pose a risk to the well-being and security of the Thirteen Colonies. Writer Philip Davidson stated that Franklin was a propagandist influential in seeing the potential in political cartoons to stir up public opinion in favor of a certain way of thinking. Franklin had proposed the Albany Plan and his cartoon suggested that such a union was necessary to avoid each colony being captured individually by the French. As Franklin wrote:

The Confidence of the French in this Undertaking seems well-grounded on the present disunited state of the British Colonies, and the extreme difficulty of bringing so many different Governments and Assemblies to agree in any speedy and effectual Measures for our common defense and Security; while our Enemies have the very great Advantage of being under one Direction, with one Council, and one Purse. ...

=== American Revolution ===
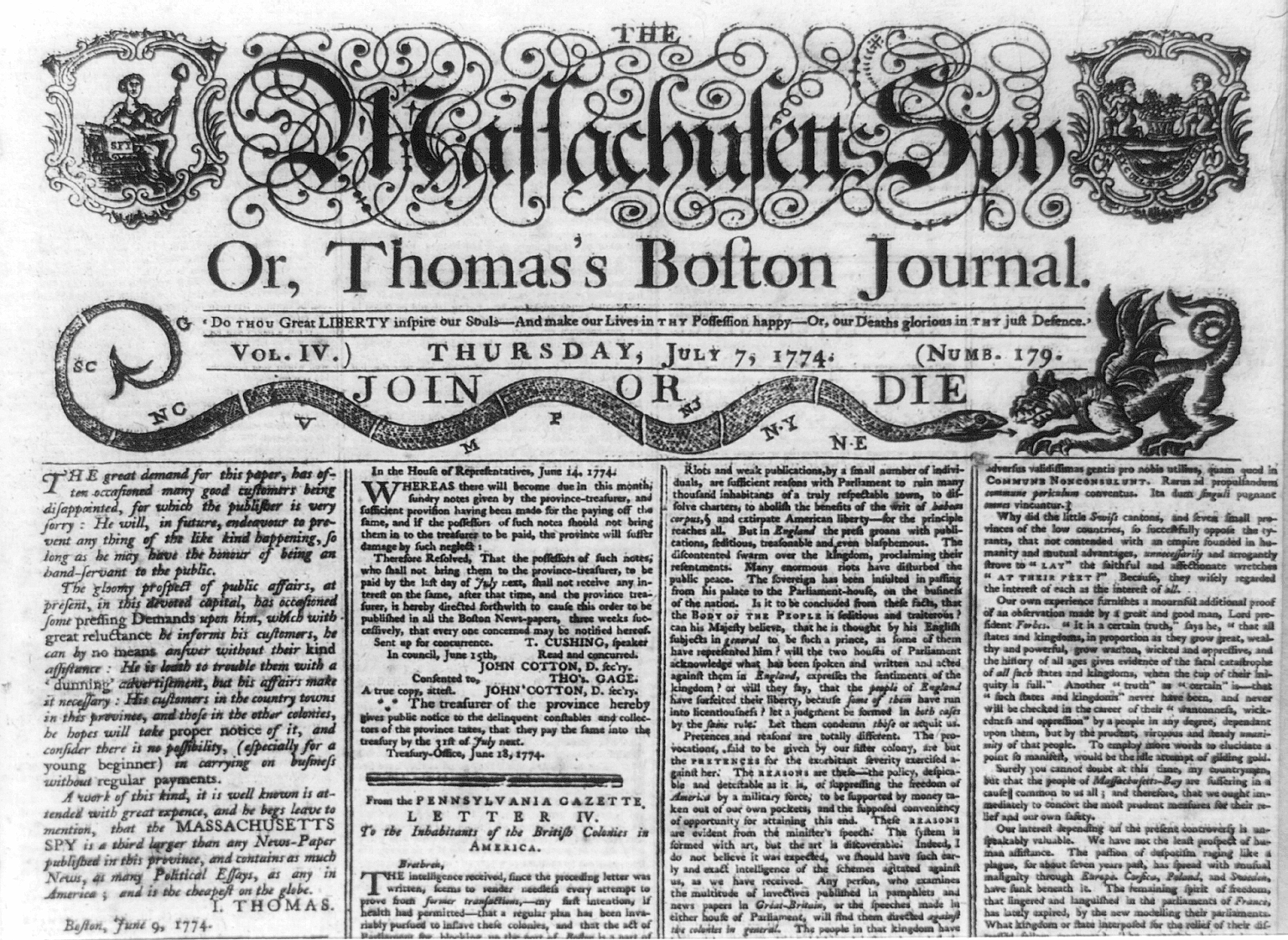
The July 7, 1774 edition of Massachusetts Spy

Franklin's political cartoon took on a different meaning during the lead up to the American Revolution, especially around 1765–1766, during the Stamp Act Congress. American colonists protesting against the rule of the Crown used the cartoon in The Constitutional Courant to help persuade their fellow colonists to rise up. However, the Patriots, who associated the image with eternity, vigilance, and prudence, were not the only ones who saw a new interpretation of the cartoon. The Loyalists saw the cartoon with more biblical traditions, such as those of guile, deceit, and treachery. Franklin himself opposed the use of his cartoon at this time, but instead advocated a moderate political policy; in 1766, he published a new cartoon MAGNA Britannia: her Colonies REDUCED, where he warned against the danger of Britain losing her American colonies by means of the image of a female figure (Britannia) with her limbs cut off. Because of Franklin's initial cartoon, however, the Courant was thought of in England as one of the most radical publications.

The difference between the use of Join or Die in 1754 and 1765 is that Franklin had designed it to unite the colonies for 'management of Indian relations' and defense against France, but in 1765 American colonists used it to urge colonial unity in favor of resisting laws and edicts that were imposed upon them. Also during this time, the phrase "join, or die" changed to "unite, or die," in some states such as New York and Pennsylvania.

Soon after the publication of the cartoon during the Stamp Act Congress, variations were printed in New York, Massachusetts, and a couple of months later in Virginia and South Carolina. In New York and Pennsylvania, the cartoon continued to be published week after week for over a year. On July 7, 1774, Paul Revere altered the cartoon to fit the masthead of the Massachusetts Spy.

== Legacy ==
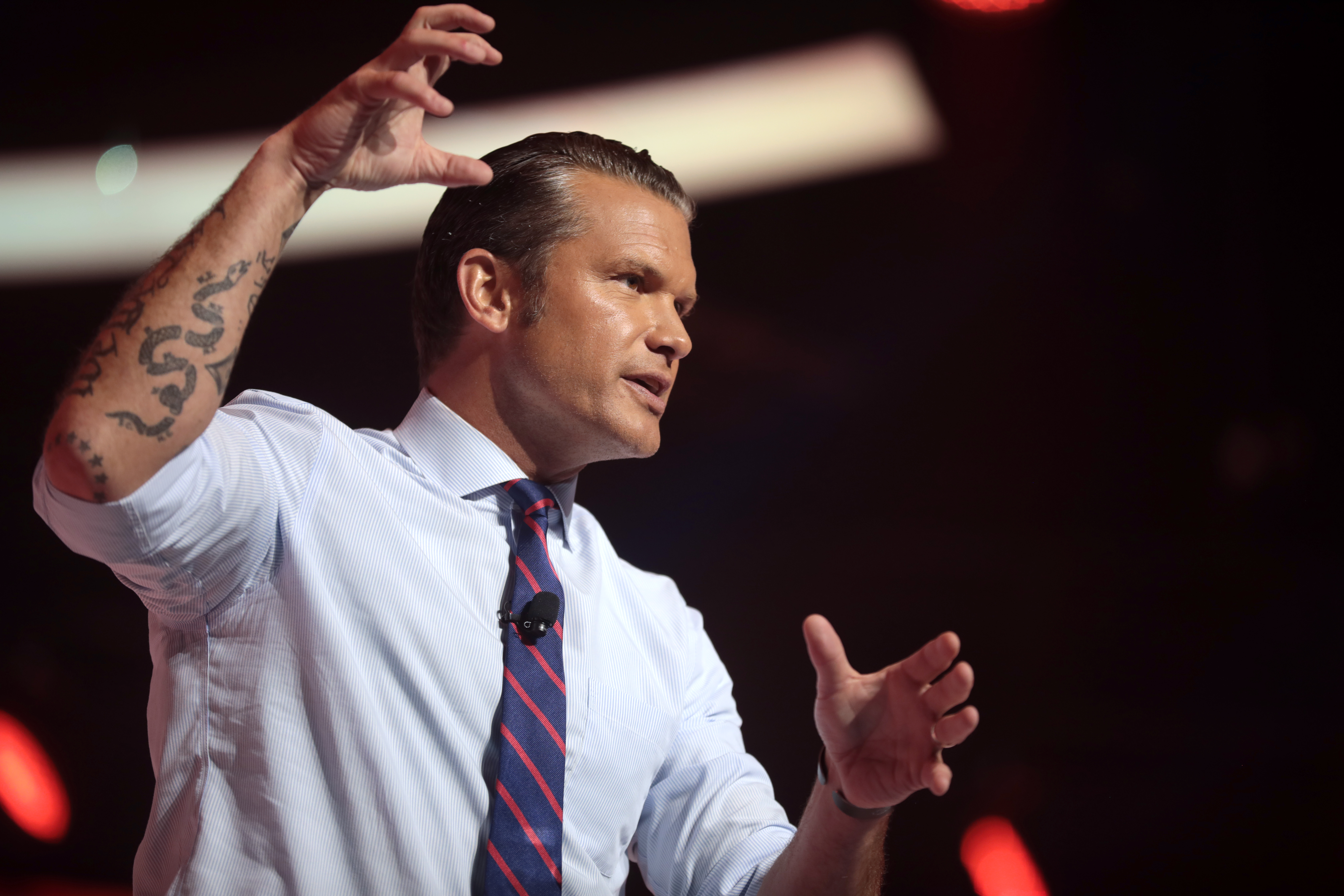
Pete Hegseth in 2022, with his Join, or Die tattoo clearly visible

The cartoon has been reprinted and redrawn widely throughout American history. Variants of the cartoon have different texts and differently labeled segments, depending on the political bodies being appealed to. During the American Revolutionary War, the image became a potent symbol of the unity displayed by the American colonists and resistance to Parliament and The Crown. In the 19th century, it was redrawn and used by both the Union and Confederacy during the American Civil War.

Comedian Craig Ferguson had the cartoon tattooed on his right forearm in 2009, after becoming a United States citizen.

United States Secretary of Defense Pete Hegseth has the cartoon tattooed on his right forearm.

To mark the site of the United States Semiquincentennial's official time capsule a 46-foot-long granite and steel statue of Join, or Die will be installed at Independence National Historical Park, outside Independence Hall in Philadelphia.

== See also ==
- Gadsden Flag
- Live Free or Die
- United we stand, divided we fall
- The American Rattle Snake, another cartoon featuring a rattlesnake
