= Il pesceballo =

Opera pastccio

Il pesceballo (The Fish-Ball) is a 19th-century American pasticcio opera in one act featuring the music of Bellini, Donizetti, Mozart, and Rossini, with a spoof Italian libretto by Francis James Child which makes use of some of grand opera's most popular melodies. The recitatives and chorus parts were written by John Knowles Paine, and James Russell Lowell translated the libretto into English.

Child was a Harvard English professor and opera lover, and the text was originally inspired by an incident which occurred to a colleague of his. One evening George Martin Lane was trying to make his way to Cambridge, MA, from Boston. He discovered that he had only 25 cents, which was not enough for both supper and the fare needed to get to Cambridge. As he was very tired and hungry, he stopped at a local diner and asked for half of a serving of macaroni. After he had recounted the story to his friends, he wrote a comic ballad, called The Lone Fish-Ball. A fishball was a fried New England concoction made of potatoes and fish stock, and usually eaten for breakfast. The ballad became very popular with Harvard students, and inspired Child's opera; it also became the source for the popular Tin Pan Alley song, "One Meat Ball".

The opera begins with a chorus sung to the tune of "La dolce aurora" from Rossini's Mosè in Egitto. The song of the Stranger in the second scene is adapted to the "Serenade" in The Barber of Seville; the song of the Padrona in the fourth scene is set to the "Non piu mesta" of La Cenerentola; the duet in the fifth scene to "La dove prende Amor recetto" of The Magic Flute; the "Cavatina" in the sixth scene to the "Di pescator" of Lucrezia Borgia; the aria of the seventh scene, to the "Madamina" of Don Giovanni; the chorus of scene eight to the "Guerra, Guerra" of Norma; the duet of scene nine to the "O sole piu ratto" of Lucia di Lammermoor; the "Cavatina" of scene ten to the "Meco all'altar" of Norma; the chorus of the same scene to the "Bando, Bando" of Lucrezia Borgia, and the trio which follows, to the "Guai se tu sfoggi" of the same opera; the piece concludes with the aria to "Vieni!", from Donizetti's La favorite.

== Performance history ==
It was first performed in a benefit concert for the Sanitary Commission, an organization that treated ill and wounded soldiers of the Union army. In 1864, it was revived for several more benefit performances, this time to aid Unionists in East Tennessee. All the productions were amateur productions, for the humor of the opera is aimed at literati and intellectuals.

The primary sources for the reconstruction of Il pesceballo are the published libretto by Child, and the recitatives and chorus parts penned by Paine, which were discovered by Mary Ellen Brown. Brown employed Eric Knechtges to organize and transcribe this work for a performance at Indiana University.

== Roles ==
Role	Voice type	Premiere cast, (Director: Kenneth J. Pereira )
Lo straniero, The stranger	tenor	Anthony Webb
Il cameriere, The waiter	baritone	Aubrey Allicock
La padrona, The landlady	mezzo-soprano	Amanda Russo
A messenger, servants of the Inn, students of Padua
