= Vingt-Hanaps =

- Part of Écouves
- Location of Vingt-Hanaps
- Location within France Location within Normandy
- Coordinates: 48°31′25″N 0°08′18″E
- Country: France
- Region: Normandy
- Department: Orne
- Arrondissement: Alençon
- Canton: Radon
- Commune: Écouves
- Area^{1}: 11.58 km^{2} (4.47 sq mi)
- Elevation: 293 m (961 ft)
- Highest elevation: 319 m (1,047 ft)
- Lowest elevation: 153 m (502 ft)
- Population (2019): 397
  - Density: 34.3/km^{2} (88.8/sq mi)
- Demonym: Vingt-Hanapsiens
- Time zone: UTC+01:00 (CET)
  - Summer (DST): UTC+02:00 (CEST)
- Postal code: 61250
- ^{1} French Land Register data, which excludes lakes, ponds, glaciers > 1 km^{2} (0.386 sq mi or 247 acres) and river estuaries.

Vingt-Hanaps (French pronunciation: [vɛ̃ anap]) is a former commune in the Orne department in north-western France. On 1 January 2016, it was merged into the new commune of Écouves.

== Notable buildings and places ==
- Markers of Forêt d'Écouves a set of 80 markers positioned in the 18th century that mark the boundaries of the forest, they were registered as a Monument historique in 1987.

== See also ==
- Communes of the Orne department
- Parc naturel régional Normandie-Maine
