= Symphony No. 1 (Paine) =

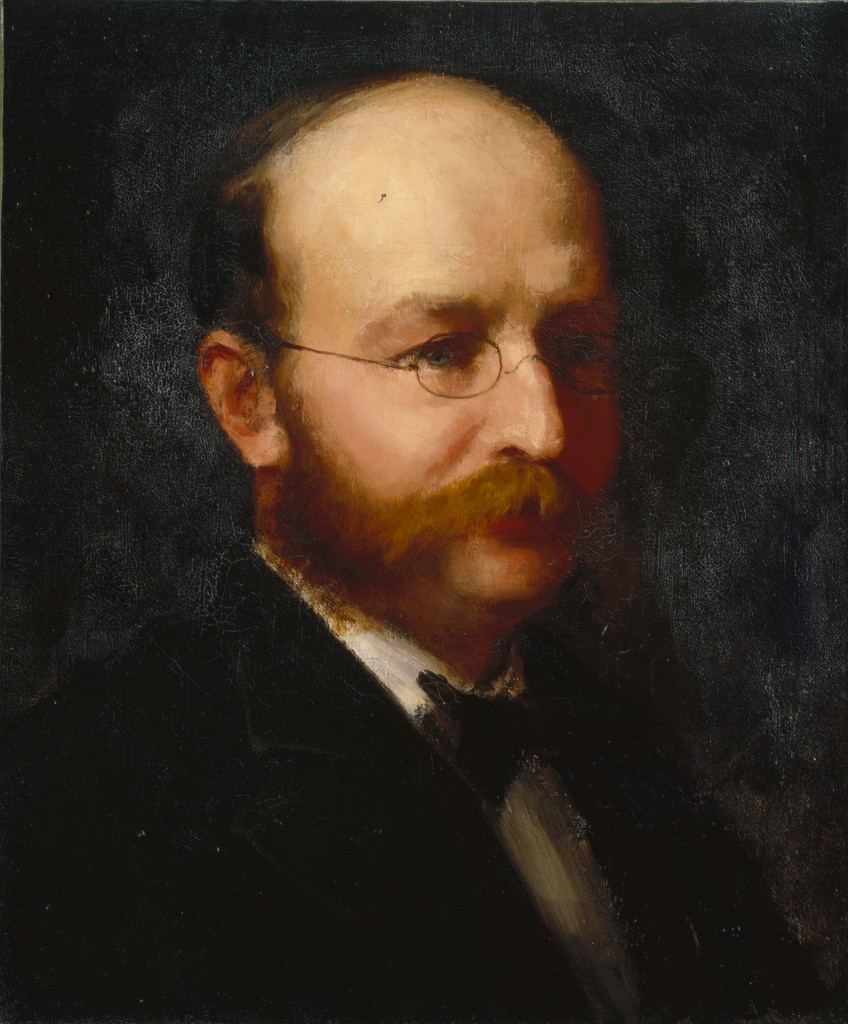
John Knowles Paine by Caroline Cranch c. 1885

Symphony No. 1 in C minor, is the first symphony by American composer John Knowles Paine. The symphony was composed between 1872 and 1875 and first performed in Boston on January 26, 1876.

== Instrumentation ==
- 2 flutes
- 2 oboes
- 2 clarinets in B♭ (written in C in the 4th movement)
- 2 bassoons
- 4 horns in C, E♭, and F
- 2 trumpets in C and E♭
- 2 tenor trombones
- bass trombone
- timpani
- strings

== Structure ==
The symphony is in four movements:

1. Allegro con brio
2. Allegro vivace
3. Adagio
4. Allegro vivace
