= Starlight (fairy tale) =

French literary fairy tale by Marie-Madeleine de Lubert

Starlight or Starlet (French: Étoilette) is a French literary fairy tale by Marie-Madeleine de Lubert. It was included in her revised edition, published in 1753, of Henriette-Julie de Murat's last novel, Les Lutins du château de Kernosy (The Sprites of Kernosy Castle, 1710), which is why it is often attributed to Madame de Murat.

== Synopsis ==
A king, whose kingdom was constantly imperiled by another king, had an only son who had fallen in love with a slave, Starlight. Her family was quite unknown, but he cared nothing for anything but her. Angry, the queen had the slave imprisoned in a tower. A beautiful white cat kept her company. The prince despaired. His father, because of a new attack, implored him to lead the army. The prince did, and the father promised that no one had harmed Starlight and that he would see her when he returned. He led the army and utterly defeated the other king's, capturing the king himself, but the king reneged on his promise. The prince freed the captive king, and the king and queen had him imprisoned. One day, Starlight confided to her cat that she was certain he had forgotten her, and the cat answered that he was also imprisoned. The cat then revealed herself as the fairy Ermine White, and told her that she was a princess. She gave her a box to be opened in her worst need, turned the tower in a stair for her escape, and made her promise to never tell who had freed her. She found the prince, and they concluded that she had to hide, which would cause his parents to free him, and send him a message of her refuge. The white cat warned them that the king's men were coming, and Starlight fled.

She found her way to the forest, where centaurs found her; this was where they had taken refuge after the unpleasantness with the Lapiths at the wedding of Pirithous. They let her stay with them, and one bore her message to the court, that the prince could hunt a white doe with silver hooves in their forest. They met there, and went to the sea, where they found a marvelous ship awaiting them, with white cats as the sailors. They set sail, but Starlight confided in the prince how she had been rescued, and a storm overtook them. The waves separated them, carrying them to different countries. The prince was carried to a quiet country, where the women did the fighting, with crabapples. He found the king abed, resting, while his wife fought the war; he thrashed him and made him go to war himself; once there, he routed the enemies. But the kingdom was attacked and defeated, and the prince taken prisoner, whereupon he was put in a boat and lost consciousness.

When he regained consciousness, he found himself in a ship that sailed by itself, back to his parents' kingdom, where he learned they had died of grief, and he was now king. He made peace with the centaurs but was always sad. His subjects proposed that he marry; he told them that he wished to marry only Starlight, but even a reward brought no news of her.

Starlight had washed ashore and been found by a king who sheltered her. One day, his queen asked her for her story, and telling it, she revealed she was their long-lost daughter. Her father resolved to marry her to a neighboring king. She opened the box and was surrounded by a cloud that darkened her skin and made her ugly. The fairy Ermine-White carried her off, back to her prince, and in his court, she became herself again. They married.

== Versions ==
The tale is sometimes known as Ismir et Étoilette.

The tale was inserted into the narrative of Les Lutins du chateau de Kernosy as a story-within-a-story, told by one of the characters, the Comte de Tourmeil.

== Analysis ==
Scholarship points out that Starlight, or Étoilette, is an adaptation of mediaeval French chantefable Aucassin and Nicolette.
