= Forges, Orne =

Forges
- Part of Écouves
- Location of Forges
- Location within France Location within Normandy
- Coordinates: 48°29′56″N 0°07′07″E
- Country: France
- Region: Normandy
- Department: Orne
- Arrondissement: Alençon
- Canton: Radon
- Commune: Écouves
- Area^{1}: 5.01 km^{2} (1.93 sq mi)
- Elevation: 165 m (541 ft)
- Highest elevation: 193 m (633 ft)
- Lowest elevation: 152 m (499 ft)
- Population (2019): 214
  - Density: 42.7/km^{2} (111/sq mi)
- Demonym: Forgerons
- Time zone: UTC+01:00 (CET)
  - Summer (DST): UTC+02:00 (CEST)
- Postal code: 61250
- ^{1} French Land Register data, which excludes lakes, ponds, glaciers > 1 km^{2} (0.386 sq mi or 247 acres) and river estuaries.

Forges (French pronunciation: [fɔʁʒ]) is a former commune in the Orne department in north-western France. On 1 January 2016, it was merged into the new commune of Écouves.

== See also ==
- Communes of the Orne department
- Parc naturel régional Normandie-Maine
