= Ladislas Medgyes =

Hungarian artist

Ladislas Medgyes (born Medgyesi László; 7 July 1892 – 25 January 1952) was a Hungarian-American artist. During the 1920s Medgyesi provided scenic design for many operetta, opera, and theatre productions in Paris, including the fully staged version of Aucassin et Nicolette. In 1927, he travelled to America and gave an exhibition of his paintings and also glass crystal sculptures.

He immigrated to the United States in 1941. He worked as art director for Helena Rubinstein's cosmetics firm. He died in 1952 in Manhattan.
