= Nicolas Verrien =

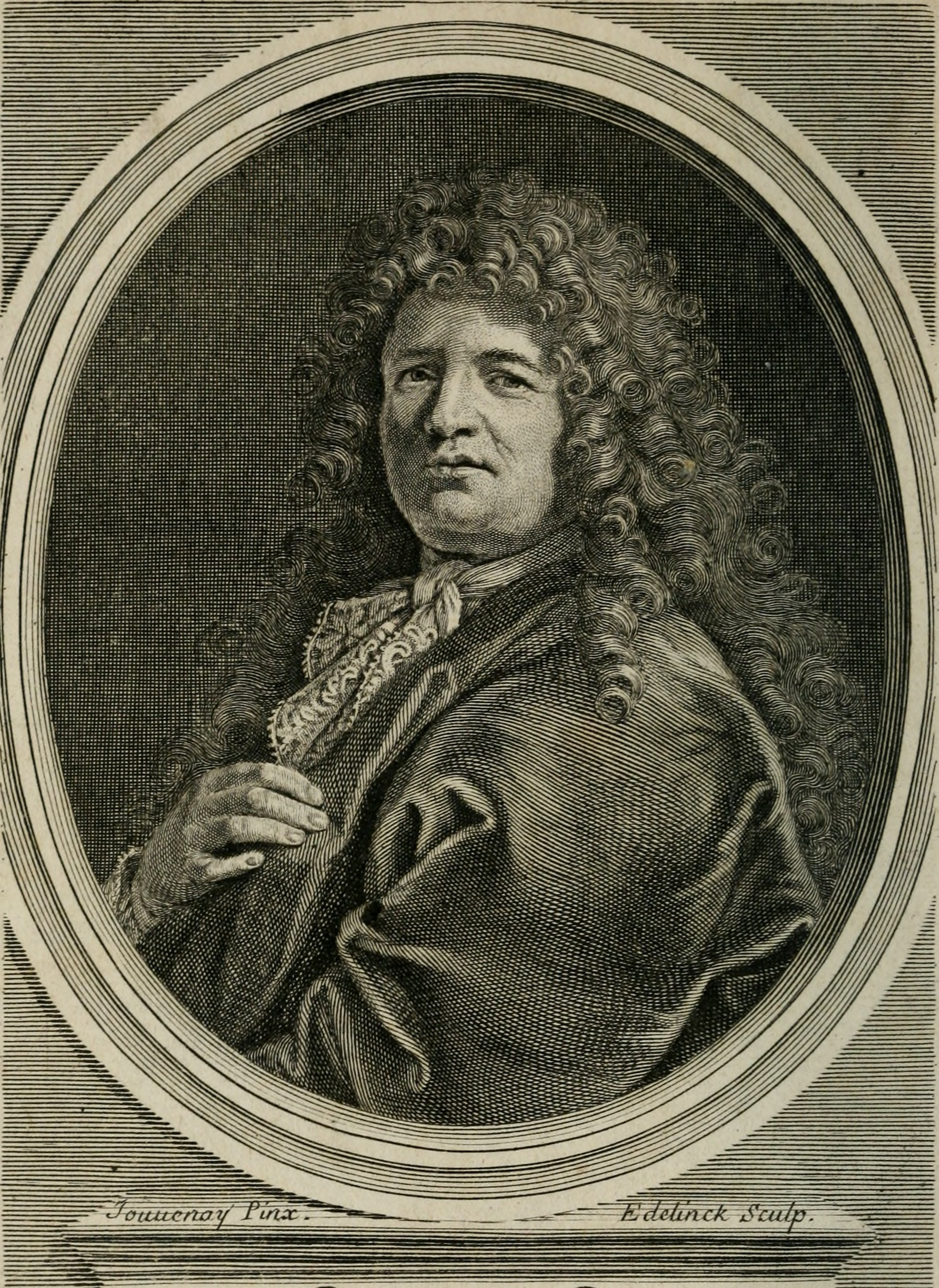
Portrait of Verrien

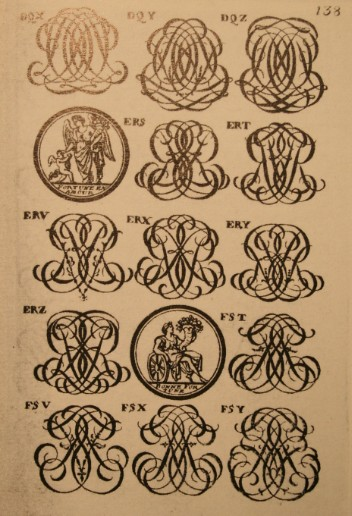
Monographs by Nicolas Verrien

Nicolas Verrien (also spelled Nicolas Verien) was a French designer who drew monograms. He was active between 1685 and 1724. His monograms were used by artists ranging from goldsmiths to painters, locksmiths and sculptors. The artist Gérard Edelinck created a portrait of Verrien. Works by Verrien are held in the collection of the Cooper–Hewitt, National Design Museum.

He also is sometimes credited in creating the original JOIN, or DIE. Join, or Die#Predecessor
