= Bertha Cushing Child =

American opera singer (1871–1933)

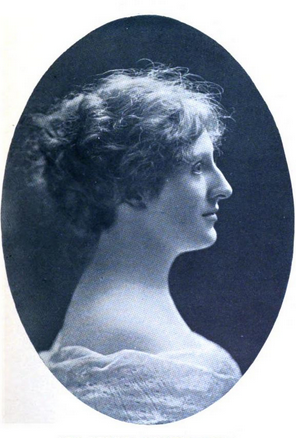
Bertha Cushing Child, from a 1903 concert program.

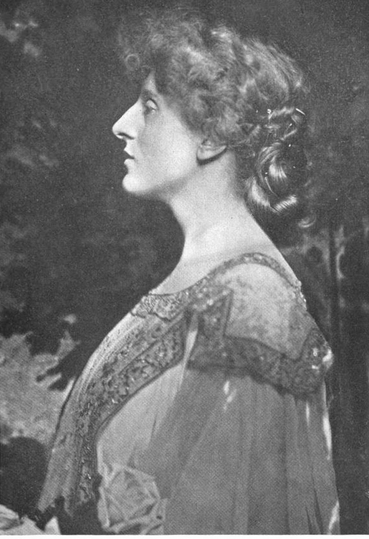
Bertha Cushing Child, from a 1908 publication.

Bertha May Cushing Child (September 11, 1871 – February 9, 1933) was an American singer and clubwoman, based in Boston, Massachusetts. She was the mother of diplomat Paul Cushing Child, and the posthumous mother-in-law of celebrity chef and author Julia Child.

== Early life ==
Bertha May Cushing was born in Stamford, Connecticut, the daughter of a Methodist minister, John Russell Cushing, and his wife, Mary Hebard Cushing. Her great-uncle was diplomat Caleb Cushing. She attended Wesleyan Academy in Wilbraham, Massachusetts, and studied voice with Clara Munger in Boston, with further vocal training in Paris.

== Career ==
Bertha May Cushing was noted as a "true contralto" concert singer in Boston. Child's voice was described as "luscious" by a New York critic. She gave recitals, sang with the Boston Symphony Orchestra, and was a soloist in the King's Chapel Choir. She also sang at Synagogue Ardath Israel in Boston, and with the city's Handel and Haydn Society, Cecilia Society, and Browning Society. She was a soloist at the White House in a 1917 concert for President Woodrow Wilson. She also taught singing, and gave musical performances with her children, billed as "Mrs. Child and the Children".

She performed at a benefit concert for the Eudowood Consumption Hospital Fund in Baltimore in 1908, and at a Boston concert raising funds for war relief causes in 1916. Child was a charter member of the Professional Woman's Club, and was a member of the Equal Suffrage Association, the Woman's City Club, and the Copley Society.

== Personal life ==
In 1899 Bertha Cushing married Charles Tripler Child, an electrical engineer who worked for the Smithsonian Institution. She was widowed with three very young children when Charles died suddenly in 1902. Son Paul Cushing Child (1902–1994) became a diplomat, and in 1946 the husband of chef Julia Child (1912–2004).

Bertha Cushing Child followed the teachings of Theosophy and was a vegetarian. She died from meningitis or a heart attack in 1933, aged 61 years, in Paris. She is buried at Père Lachaise Cemetery.
