= Radon, Orne =

Radon
- Part of Écouves
- Location of Radon
- Location within France Location within Normandy
- Coordinates: 48°30′14″N 0°06′09″E
- Country: France
- Region: Normandy
- Department: Orne
- Arrondissement: Alençon
- Canton: Radon
- Commune: Écouves
- Area^{1}: 19.81 km^{2} (7.65 sq mi)
- Elevation: 180 m (590 ft)
- Highest elevation: 345 m (1,132 ft)
- Lowest elevation: 148 m (486 ft)
- Population (2019): 1,036
  - Density: 52.30/km^{2} (135.4/sq mi)
- Time zone: UTC+01:00 (CET)
  - Summer (DST): UTC+02:00 (CEST)
- Postal code: 61250
- ^{1} French Land Register data, which excludes lakes, ponds, glaciers > 1 km^{2} (0.386 sq mi or 247 acres) and river estuaries.

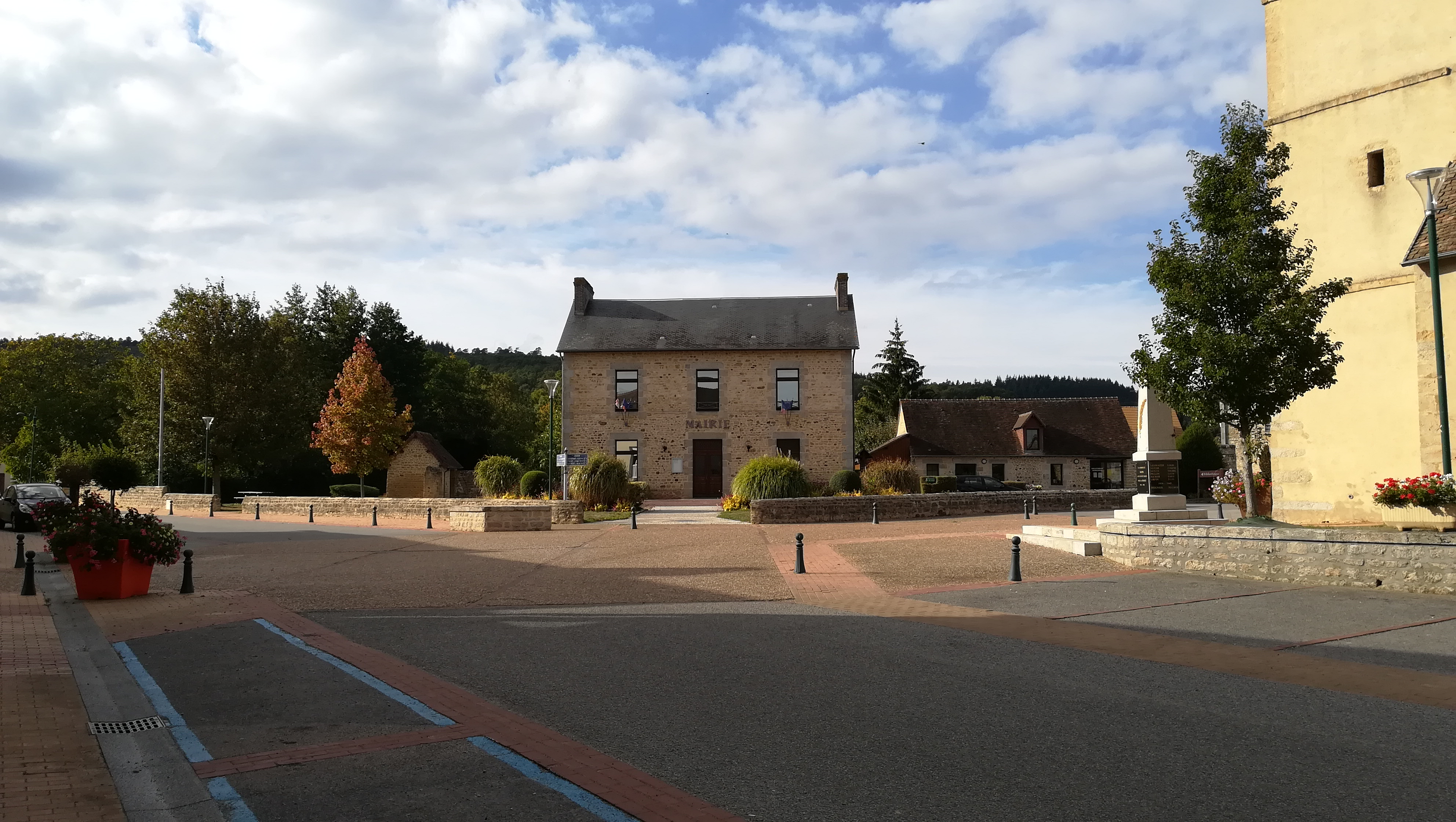
Mairie de Radon

Radon (French pronunciation: [ʁadɔ̃]) is a former commune in the Orne department in north-western France. On 1 January 2016, it was merged into the new commune of Écouves. It is around 7 km north of Alençon.

== Notable buildings and places ==
=== National heritage sites ===
- Markers of Forêt d'Écouves a set of 80 markers positioned in the 18th century that mark the boundaries of the forest, they were registered as a Monument historique in 1987.

== See also ==
- Communes of the Orne department
- Parc naturel régional Normandie-Maine
