= Francis James Child =

American folklorist (1825–1896)

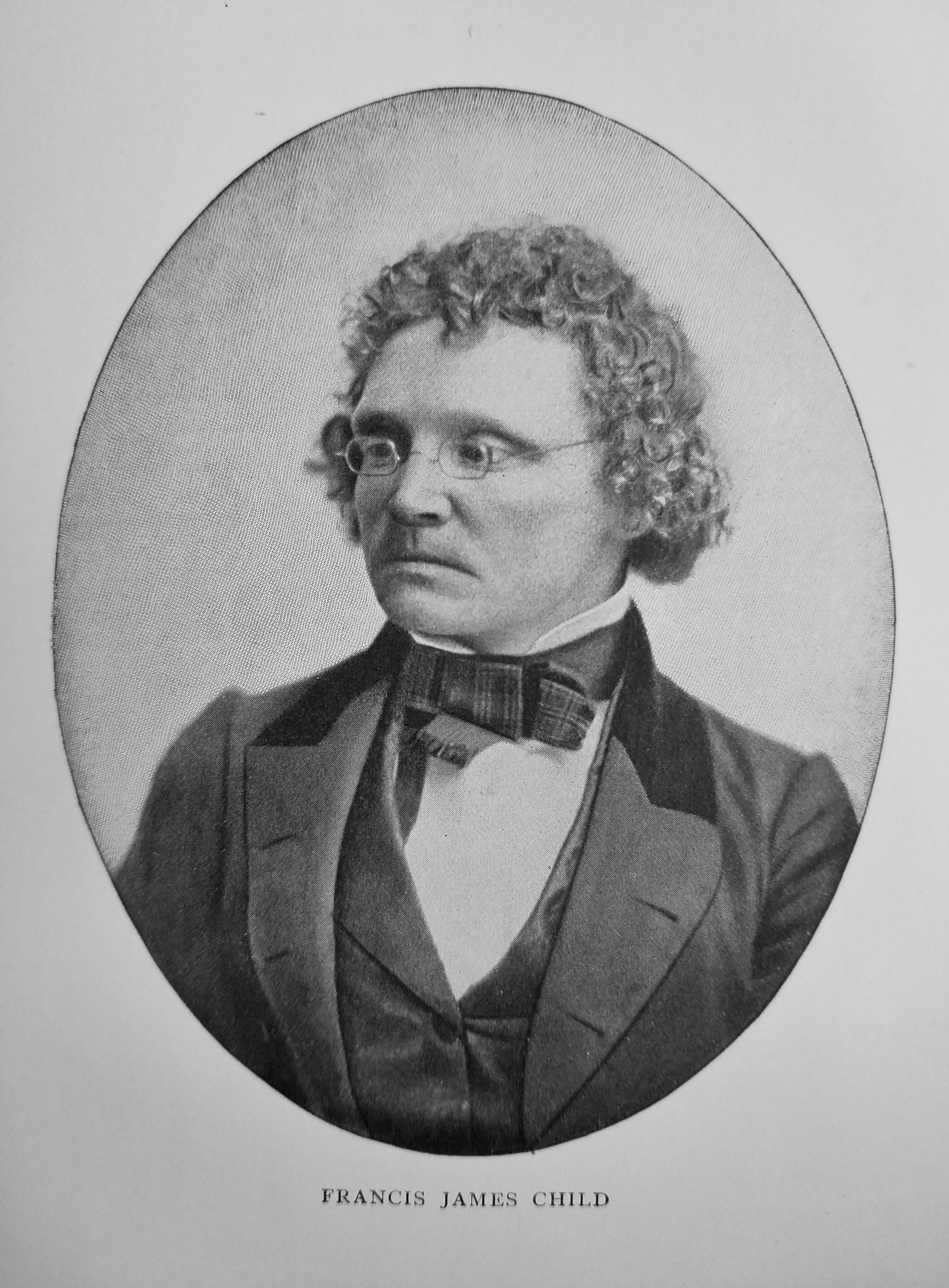
- Born: February 1, 1825; Boston, Massachusetts, U.S.
- Died: July 11, 1896 (aged 71); Boston, Massachusetts, U.S.
- Burial place: "Sedgwick Pie", Stockbridge, Massachusetts
- Education: Harvard University
- Occupations: English professor, folklorist
- Known for: Child Ballads
- Spouse: Elizabeth Ellery Sedgwick

Francis James Child (February 1, 1825 – September 11, 1896) was an American scholar, educator, and folklorist, best known today for his collection of English and Scottish ballads now known as the Child Ballads. Child was Boylston Professor of Rhetoric and Oratory at Harvard University, where he produced influential editions of English poetry. In 1876 he was named Harvard's first professor of English, a position which allowed him to focus on academic research. It was during this time that he began work on the Child Ballads.

The Child Ballads were published in five volumes between 1882 and 1898. While Child was primarily a literary scholar with little interest in the music of the ballads, his work became a major contribution to the study of English-language folk music.

== Biography ==
Francis James Child was born in Boston, Massachusetts. His lifelong friend, scholar and social reformer Charles Eliot Norton, described Child's father, a sailmaker, as "one of that class of intelligent and independent mechanics [i.e., skilled craftsmen], which has had a large share of developing the character of our democratic community, as of old the same class had in Athens or in Florence." The family was poor, but thanks to the city of Boston's system of free public schools, the boy was educated at the Boston's grammar schools and The English High School. There his brilliance came to the attention of the principal of the Boston Latin School, Epes Sargent Dixwell, who saw to it that the promising youngster was furnished with a scholarship to attend Harvard University.

At Harvard, "Frank" (nicknamed "Stubby" on account of his short stature) excelled in all classes and also read widely outside his studies for his own pleasure. Although shy and diffident on account of his working-class origins, he was soon recognized as "the best writer, best speaker, best mathematician, the most accomplished person in knowledge of general literature", and he became extremely popular with his classmates. He graduated in 1846, topping his class in all subjects, and was chosen Class Orator by his graduating class (of sixty), who received his valedictory speech with "tumultuous applause". Upon graduation Child was appointed tutor in mathematics at Harvard and in 1848 was transferred to a tutorship in history, political economy, and English literature.

In 1848, Child published a critically annotated edition (the first of the kind to be produced in America) of Four Old Plays of the early English Renaissance. Though there were no graduate schools in America at the time, a loan from a benefactor, Jonathan I. Bowditch, to whom the book was dedicated, enabled Child to take a leave of absence from his teaching duties to pursue his studies in Germany. There Child studied English drama and Germanic philology at the University of Göttingen, which conferred on him an honorary doctorate, and at Humboldt University, Berlin, where he heard lectures by the linguists Grimm and was much influenced by them.

In 1851, at the age of 26, Child succeeded Edward T. Channing as Harvard's Boylston Professor of Rhetoric and Oratory, a position he held until Adams Sherman Hill was appointed to the professorship in 1876. Harvard had at that time an enrollment of 382 undergraduates and a faculty of 14, including the president of the university, who was then James Walker.

As a mathematician, wrote folklore scholar David E. Bynum, Child came to his interest "in what he variously called 'popular', 'primitive', or 'traditional' balladry'" (that is, in oral literature, then deemed "primitive" because its stylistic features antedate the invention of writing) not by accident "but by force of logic":

Child well understood how indispensable good writing and good speaking are to civilization, or as many would now prefer to say, to society. For him, writing and speaking were not only the practical means by which men share useful information, but also the means whereby they formulate and share values, including the higher order of values that give meaning to life and purpose to human activities of all sorts. Concerned as he thus so greatly was with rhetoric, oratory, and the motives of those mental disciplines, Child was inevitably drawn into pondering the essential differences between speech and writing, and to searching for the origins of thoughtful expression in English.

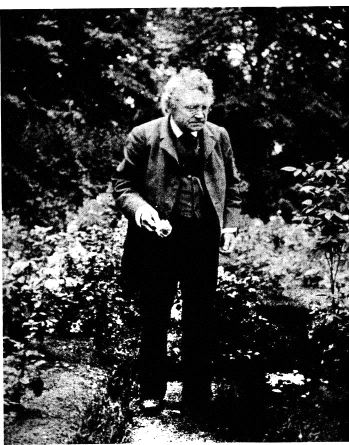
Child, a keen gardener and devotee of antique roses, photographed (probably by Charles Eliot Norton) in his rose garden. Verses about "the rose and the briar" occur in many ballads.

During the twenty-five years Child was Professor of Rhetoric at Harvard he undertook general editorial supervision of the publication of a 130-volume collection of the works of the British poets, many not previously generally available to the reading public, which began appearing 1853. The volumes on the works of Edmund Spenser (five volumes, Boston, 1855) and the English and Scottish Ballads (in eight small volumes, Boston, 1857–1858), Child edited himself. Child planned a critical edition of the works of Chaucer, as well. He soon realized that this could not be done, however, since only one early (and faulty) text was available. He therefore wrote a treatise, blandly titled "Observations on the Language of Chaucer", published in the Memoirs of the American Academy of Arts and Sciences (1863), intended to make such an edition possible.

Child's linguistic researches are largely responsible for how Chaucerian grammar, pronunciation, and scansion are now generally understood.

Child's largest undertaking, however, grew out of the original English and Scottish Ballads volume in his British Poets series. The material for this volume was mostly derived from texts in previously published books. In compiling this work he realized that the folio manuscript of Percy's Reliques, from which most of these texts were drawn, was not available for public inspection, and he set about to remedy this situation. In the 1860s he campaigned energetically for public support to enable the Early English Text Society, founded by philologist Frederick James Furnivall, to obtain a copy of Percy's Folio and publish it, which they did in 1868. Child and Furnivall then went on to found The Ballad Society, with a view to publishing other important early ballad collections, such as that of Samuel Pepys.

In 1876, University of California President Daniel Coit Gilman offered Child a research professorship at the newly established Johns Hopkins University in Baltimore, which Gilman was in the process of organizing. Johns Hopkins was the first American university conceived on the German research model initiated by Wilhelm von Humboldt and divided into departments representing "the branches of knowledge", with elective subjects and a graduate school dedicated to advanced studies. In order to retain him, Harvard's president Charles William Eliot created the title of "Professor of English" especially for Child, freeing him from supervising oral recitations and correcting composition papers so that he could have more time for research. Thereafter, Child devoted himself to the comparative study of British vernacular ballads, using methods adopted from historical comparative philology to arrive at the earliest attested versions.

Child believed that folk ballads came from a more democratic time in the past when society was not so rigidly segregated into classes, and the "true voice" of the people could therefore be heard. He conceived "the people" as comprising all the classes of society, rich, middle, and poor, and not only those engaged in manual labor as Marxists sometimes use the word. Although Child concentrated his collections on manuscript texts with a view of determining their chronology, he also gave a sedulous but conservative hearing to popular versions still surviving. Child carried his investigations into the ballads of languages other than English, engaging in extensive international correspondence on the subject with colleagues abroad, primarily with the Danish literary historian and ethnographer Svend Grundtvig, whose monumental twelve-volume compilation of Danish ballads, Danmarks gamle Folkeviser, vols. 1–12 (Copenhagen, 1853), was the model for Child's resulting canonical five-volume edition of some 305 English and Scottish ballads and their numerous variants.

Since the ballads were known to have been a pan-European, Turkish, and North African phenomenon, Child and Grundtvig also consulted with numerous scholars in other parts of the world, such as the Sicilian physician, folklorist, and ethnographer Giuseppe Pitrè. In 1888, Child founded the American Folklore Society and served as its president. The AFS has the mission of collecting and preserving African-American and Native American folklore equally with that of European derivation.

Worked and overworked to the last, he died in Boston after completing his task – apart from a planned general introduction and bibliography. A biographical introduction was prefixed to the work by his student and successor, George Lyman Kittredge.

Child added to the Harvard University Library one of the largest folklore collections in existence. Kittredge, who succeeded him as Professor of English literature and modern languages at Harvard, considered himself the custodian of Child's scholarly legacy. Kittredge became president of the American Folklore Society in 1904.

All the earlier, printed sources known to Child ('The Child Ballads'), were subsumed, and progressed upon in number and research by Steve Roud, in the Roud Folk Song Index.

He is buried in the cemetery in Stockbridge, Massachusetts, in the "Sedgwick Pie", since (like his good friend Charles Eliot Norton), he had married into the Sedgwick family.

== The English and Scottish Popular Ballads ==
Child's monumental final collection was published as The English and Scottish Popular Ballads in 1882–1898, at first in ten parts (the tenth, posthumously) and then in five quarto volumes, and for a long time was the authoritative treasury of their subject. The "English" and "Scottish" of the title notwithstanding, it was an international piece of research, with references that include thirty different language sources.

A commemorative article in the 2006 edition of the Harvard Magazine states:

Child's enthusiasm and erudition shine throughout his systematic attempt to set the British ballad tradition in context with others, whether Danish, Serbian, or Turkish. He made no attempt to conceal or apologize for the sexuality, theatrical violence, and ill-concealed paganism of many ballads, but it is characteristic of the man that in his introduction to "Hugh of Lincoln," an ancient work about the purported murder of a Christian child by a Jew, he wrote, "And these pretended child-murders, with their horrible consequences, are only a part of the persecution which, with all moderation, may be rubricated as the most disgraceful chapter in the history of the human race."

Since Child did not live to complete the planned introduction to his work which was to have explained his methodology, it has sometimes been alleged his selection was arbitrary and based purely on personal taste. The most recent edition of the ballads, however, published in 2002, now includes Child's rediscovered essay, "Ballad Poetry," which he had published anonymously in 1874. Reviewing the new edition, Ian Olson notes that the rediscovered essay:

gives considerable insight into Child's thinking after he had published his "first go" of English and Scottish Ballads in 1857-59 and was in the process of researching and reconsidering his last great work. It may not be Child's "final statement" that we all wish he had lived to make, but it comes close in many ways, and nicely complements the original Introduction to 1880s English and Scottish Popular Ballads made by Child's successor, George Lyman Kittredge (retained in this volume).

Owing to the indelicate nature of their theme, certain traditional ballads such as The Crabfish were deliberately excluded from this work. For a listing of all the Child ballad types, and links to more information on each individual type, see List of the Child Ballads.

== See also ==
- Il Pesceballo
