= William Henry Huntington =

American journalist

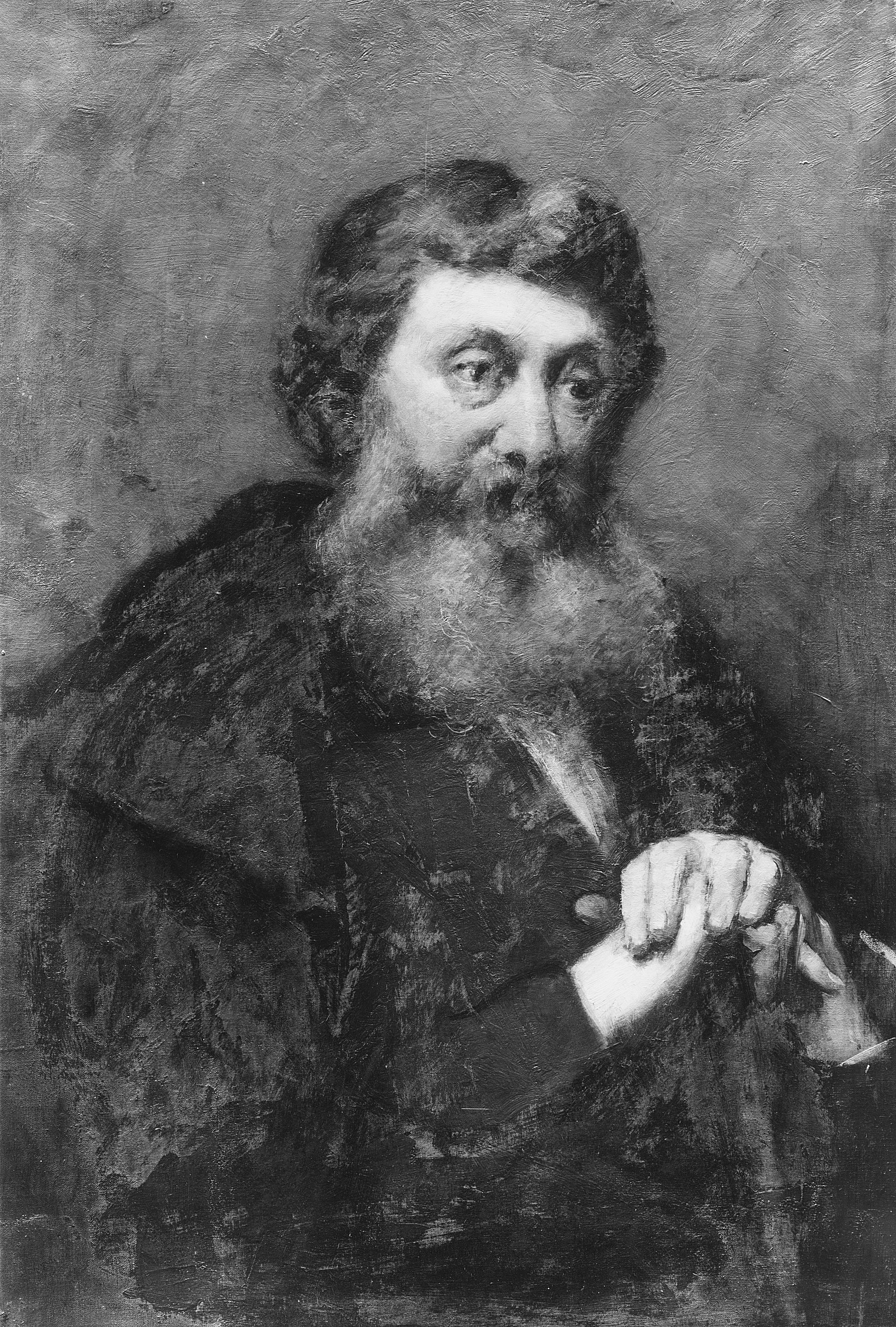
William Henry Huntington by Caroline Cranch ca. 1880–81

William Henry Huntington (c. 1820–1885) was an American journalist, born at Norwich, Connecticut. He attended Wesleyan University in Middletown, Connecticut, and there became a member of the Mystical Seven. He was in Paris as correspondent of the New York Tribune for 20 years, from 1858. He notoriously nicknamed Napoleon III, "Prince Napkin". His philanthropic work the Siege of Paris (1870–1871) was important. He bequeathed his collection of medals, bronzes, porcelains, miniatures, engravings, and prints relating to Washington, Lafayette, and Franklin to the Metropolitan Museum, New York.
