= Cloverden =

Historic house in Massachusetts, United States

- U.S. National Register of Historic Places
- U.S. Historic district – Contributing property
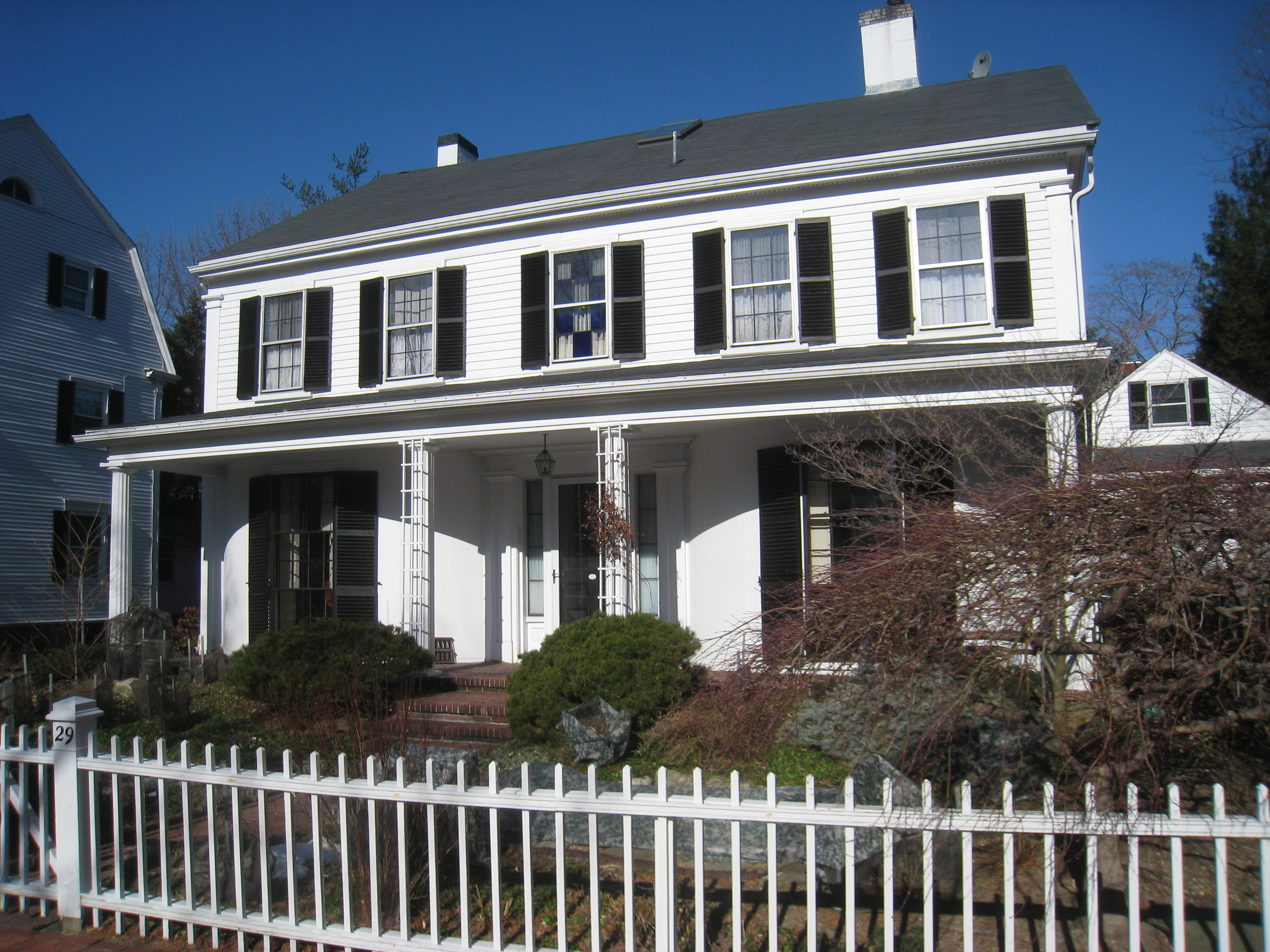

- Location within Massachusetts Location within the United States
- Location: 29 Follen St., Cambridge, Massachusetts
- Coordinates: 42°22′44.6″N 71°07′16″W
- Built: 1837
- Architectural style: Greek Revival
- Part of: Follen Street Historic District (ID86001681)
- MPS: Cambridge MRA
- NRHP reference No.: 83000793

Significant dates
- Added to NRHP: June 30, 1983
- Designated CP: May 19, 1986

Cloverden is an historic house at 29 Follen Street in Cambridge, Massachusetts. It is a 2 1/2-story wood-frame structure, five bays wide, with a side-gable roof, two asymmetrically placed chimneys, and clapboard siding. A single-story porch extends across the front, supported by Doric columns. The Greek Revival house was built in 1837.

The house served as bachelor housing for Harvard University faculty in the 1850s, and was known as a center of hospitality where "the famous 'Roman Banquet' was given", according to William Watson Goodwin. Prominent occupants include geology professor Josiah Dwight Whitney, and Mary Mann, the mother of education reform proponent Horace Mann.

The house was listed on the National Register of Historic Places in 1983.

== See also ==
- National Register of Historic Places listings in Cambridge, Massachusetts
- Follen Street Historic District
