= Marguerite de Lubert =

- Born: Marie-Madeleine de Lubert; December 17, 1702; Paris, France
- Died: July 20, 1785 (aged 82); Argentan, France
- Occupation(s): Academic, author, fairytale transcriber and playwright
- Parent: Louis de Lubert (father)

Marguerite de Lubert or Marie-Madeleine de Lubert (17 December 1702, Paris – 20 August 1785, Argentan) was a French woman of letters.

== Life ==
Marie-Madeleine, sometimes called Marguerite de Lubert, whose life is little known, is the author of wonderful folk tales. De Lubert was the daughter of Louis de Lubert, president of the Third Chamber of the Inquiry of Parliament, amateur musician (violin) and founder on 10 January 1722 of one of the first amateur orchestras in Paris, the Academy of Mellophiletes.

She corresponded with Voltaire, and sent him a play of verses in 1732.

== Works ==
- Tecserion, 1737 or, in 1743, Sec et noir, ou la Princesse des fleurs et le prince des autruches, conte, avec un Discours préliminaire, qui contient l'apologie des contes de fées ("Dry and Black, or the Flower Princess and the Ostrich Prince")
- La Princesse Camion ("Princess Camion"), 1743 ISBN 9783628613159, OCLC 722383566
- Le Prince Glacé et la princesse Étincelante ("Prince Frozen and Princess Sparkling"), 1743 OCLC 457682705
- La Princesse Couleur de rose et le prince Céladon ("Princess Roseate and Prince Celadon"), 1743 OCLC 494415303
- La Princesse Lionnette et le prince Coquerico ("Princess Lionette and Prince Coquerico"), 1743
- La Princesse Sensible et le prince Typhon ("Princess Sensible and Prince Typhon"), 1743
- La Princesse Coque d'Oeuf et le prince Bonbon ("Princess Eggshell and Prince Bonbon"), 1743
- La Veillée galante, 1747 ("The Galant Gathering"), with a fairy tale inserted: Le Petit Chien Blanc ("The Little White Dog")
- Amadis de Gaules, 4 vol., 1750
- Blancherose, 1751
- Mourat et Turquia, histoire africaine, 1752
- Le Château des lutins de Kernosy, 1753, with two fairy tales inserted: Étoilette ("Starlight") and Peau d'Ourse ("Bearskin"),
- Leonille: Nouvelle. Lambert. 1755.
- La Tyrannie des fées détruite, 1756 (re-edition)
- Histoire secrète du prince Croqu'étron et de la princesse Foirette, v. 1790

Recent collections

- Aurélie Zygel-Basso (ed) Contes Paris: H. Champion; Genève : Diffusion, Slatkine, 2005 ISBN 9782745311580, OCLC 969875322
