= Alice May Bates Rice =

American opera singer

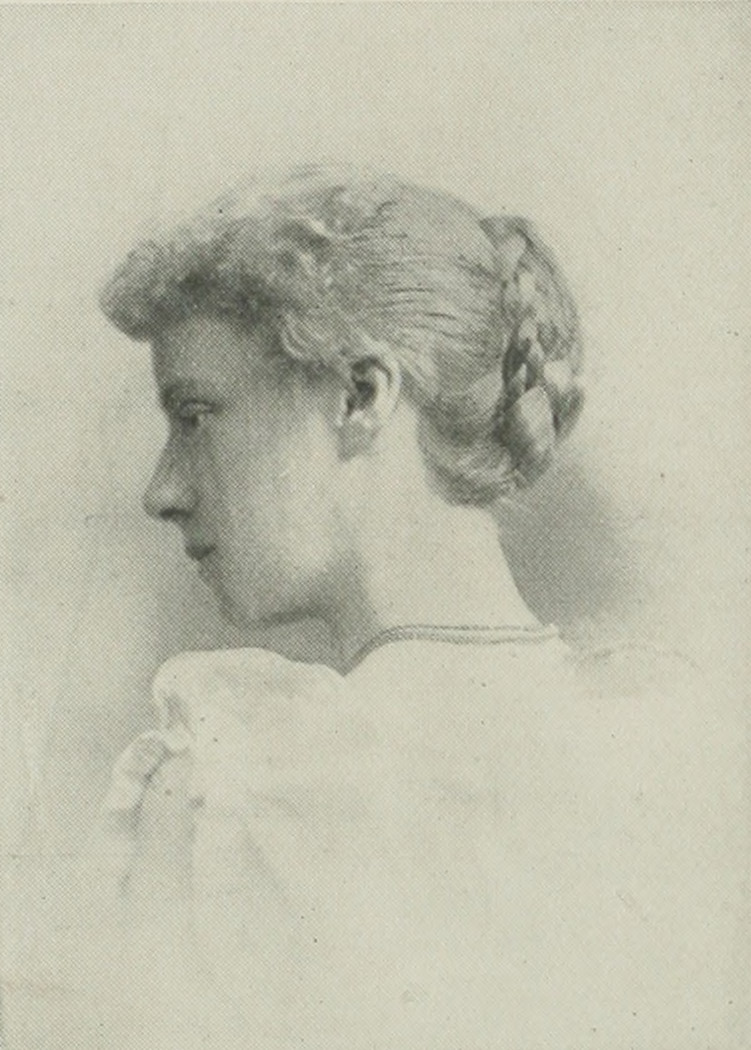

Background information
- Born: September 14, 1868; Charlestown, Boston, Massachusetts, United States
- Died: After 1907
- Occupation: Soprano singer

Alice May Bates Rice (born 14 September 1868 - after 1907) was a soprano singer, born in the U.S. state of Massachusetts.

== Biography ==
Alice May Bates was born in Charlestown, Boston, Massachusetts. She was the daughter of Benjamin Franklin and Alice Perkins (Field) Bates. Her parents were both well known in the musical profession, and her ancestors on both sides were musical for a number of generations. Rice's father possessed a baritone voice and held positions in quartette choirs, musical societies and clubs in and around Boston, until a few years before his death, in 1886. Her mother was a teacher of music.

Rice made her debut in Checkering Hall, Boston, in September, 1883. During her first season, she appeared in several operas, which Charles R. Adams, with whom she studied rendition, brought out, assuming the prima donna roles in "Martha," "Figaro," "Maritana," "La Sonnambula," "La Fille du Regiment," "Faust", and "Lucia di Lammermoor". She was the prima donna, subsequently, of the Maritana Opera Company and appeared with them for several seasons in New England and Canada. She sang in many concerts for the Boston Philharmonic Orchestra and for Anton Seidl's New York Orchestra. She held positions in quartette choirs in Lowell and Worcester, and in her own city, leaving a lucrative one for her recent tour with Reményi, with whom she traveled through the South and West for 150 concerts in seven months.

== Personal life ==
Alice May Bates married William Rice (born Dublin, New Hampshire, September 4, 1867), a dentist. He received his D.D.S. from the Boston Dental College, 1888; and D.M.D. in 1905, from Tufts College Dental School, of which he was Dean, in 1917. They had children, Priscilla Alden (1894-1901), and Persis Alden (born 1907).

== Bibliography ==
- Leonard, Levi Washburn; Steward, Josiah Lafayette; Mason, Charles (1920). The History of Dublin, N.H.: Containing the Address by Charles Mason, and the Proceedings at the Centennial Celebration, June 17, 1852, with a Register of Families. Town of Dublin.
- Willard, Frances Elizabeth (1893). A Woman of the Century: Fourteen Hundred-seventy Biographical Sketches Accompanied by Portraits of Leading American Women in All Walks of Life (Public domain ed.). Moulton. ISBN 9780722217139.
