= Paul Le Flem =

French composer and music critic

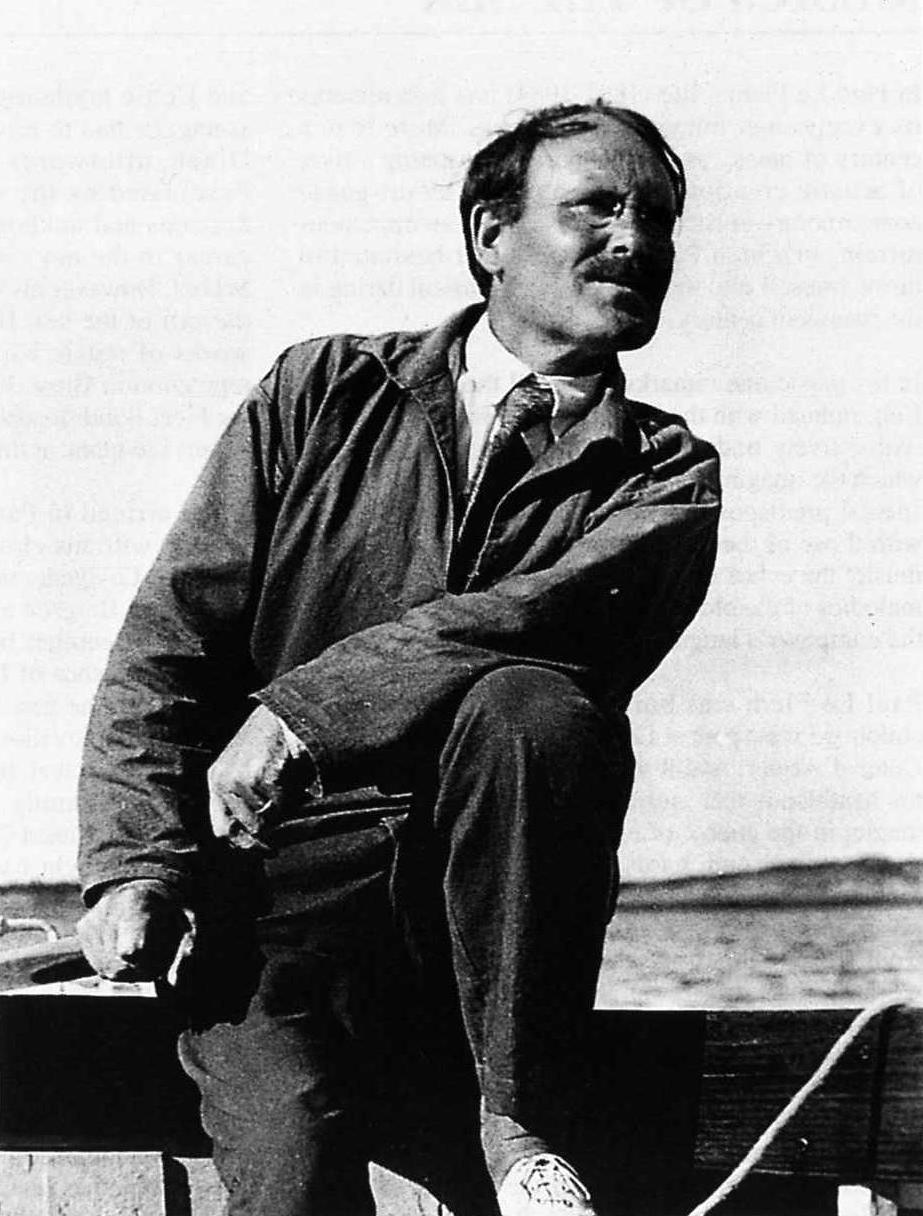
- Born: 18 March 1881; Radon, France
- Died: 31 July 1984 (aged 103); Tréguier, France

Marie-Paul Achille Auguste Le Flem (18 March 1881 – 31 July 1984) was a French composer and music critic.

== Biography ==
Born in Radon, Orne, of Breton parentage, son of Célestin Louis Joseph Marie Le Flem and wife Gabrielle Marie Dorenlo, and living most of his life in Lézardrieux, Le Flem studied at the Schola Cantorum under Vincent d'Indy and Albert Roussel, later teaching at the same establishment, where his pupils included Erik Satie (as a mature student) and André Jolivet. His music is strongly influenced by his native Brittany, the landscape of which is reflected in most of his work. He spoke Breton and remained strongly attached to Breton culture throughout his life.

In September 1902, he departed for Russia to take up a teaching position, during which he learned Russian. Nevertheless, he soon grew homesick and returned to Brittany after turning down another job opportunity in the Crimea.

Before World War I, Le Flem produced several major works, including his First Symphony, a Fantasy for Piano and Orchestra, and an opera. The war temporarily put an end to his compositional activities. Le Flem was mobilised as a stretcher-bearer during the war, and his knowledge of Russian enabled him to be assigned to the Russian Expeditionary Force in France, where he was invited to lead their military band. After the war he devoted himself to music criticism and choral conducting. He wrote numerous articles for the periodical Comoedia.

In 1937, he began composing once again. Three additional symphonies and a second opera followed before he was finally forced to give up composition in 1976, at the age of 95, due to blindness. He died on 31 July 1984 at the age of 103.

Some of his dramatic works include the operas Le Rossignol de St-Malo (The Nightingale of St Malo) and La Magicienne de la mer (The Magician of the Sea), as well as the shadow puppet opera Aucassin et Nicolette. For the Dead and the seven Pièces enfantines, both originally written in 1911, were orchestrated some years later. Two of the composer's children died young, and For the Dead is dedicated to their memory. In addition to his symphonies, Le Flem wrote evocative orchestral music such as En mer (At Sea) and La Voix du large (The Voice of the Open Sea). Le Flem also composed the music for Jean Tedesco's short film The Great Gardener of France in 1942.

Le Flem was a member of the Association des Compositeurs Breton; another member, the Irish-American Swan Hennessy (1866–1929) dedicated his Petit trio celtique, Op. 52 (1921) to Le Flem.

== Personal life ==
He died in Tréguier in 1984, having reached the age of 103.

He married Jeanne Louise Yvonne Marie Even, daughter of Jacques Michel Marie Even and wife Palmire Marie Droniou, was the grandfather of Swedish-French actress Marika Green and the great-grandfather of French actress Eva Green.

== Selected compositions ==
=== Opera ===
- Aucassin et Nicolette (1909)
- La Fête du printemps (1937)
- Le Rossignol de Saint-Malo (1938)
- La Clairière des fées (1944)
- La Magicienne de la mer (1947)
- La Maudite (1968)

=== Orchestral ===
- Symphony No. 1 (1908)
- Les Voix du large (1911)
- Fantaisie (1911) for piano and orchestra
- Le Village (1943)
- La Ronde des fées (1943)
- Symphony No. 2 (1958)
- Concertstück (1964) for violin and orchestra
- Symphony No. 3 (1967)
- Symphony No. 4 (1974)

=== Chamber music ===
- Sonata for violin and piano (1905)
- Danse désuète for harp and string quartet (1909)
- Quintet for piano and string quartet (1910)
- Pièce for flute and cello (1925)
- Pièce for horn and piano (1952)
- Sérénité for Ondes Martenot and piano (1955)
- Concertstück (1964) for violin and piano (1964)

=== Piano music ===
- Éponine et Sabinius (1897)
- Par landes (1907)
- Par grèves (1907)
- Avril (1910)
- Le Chant des genêts (1910)
- Vieux calvaire (1910)
- Sept Pièces enfantines (1911)
- Pavane de mademoiselle (Style Louis XIV) (undated)

== Selected recordings ==
- Paul Le Flem: Quintette & Sonate, Timpani 1C1077 (2004), performed by Philippe Koch (vn), Alain Jacquon (pf), Quatuor Louvigny. Contains: Quintet for piano and strings; Violin Sonata.
- Paul Le Flem: Complete Piano Works, Grand Piano GP 695 (CD, 2016), performed by Giorgio Koukl. Contains: Avril; Vieux calvaire; Par landes; Par grèves; Le Chant des genêts; Sept Pièces enfantines; Les Korrigans – Valse bretonne; Pour la main droite; Mélancolie; Éponine et Sabinius; Pavane de mademoiselle (Style Louis XIV); Émotions.

== Bibliography ==
- Vendramini-Joseph, Cecile: Paul le Flem, musicien breton (Diss. Paris: Univ. Sorbonne, 1980).
- Vefa de Bellaing: Dictionnaire des compositeurs de musique en Bretagne (Nantes: Ouest Editions, 1992), ISBN 978-2-908261-11-0.
- Bernard-Krauss, Geneviève: Hundert Jahre französischer Musikgeschichte in Leben und Werk Paul Le Flems (Frankfurt etc.: Peter Lang, 1993), ISBN 9783631434420.
- Gonin, Philippe: Vie et œuvre de Paul Le Flem (Villeneuve-d'Ascq: Presses universitaires du Septentrion, 2001).
