= Caroline Cranch =

American painter (1853 – 1931)

Caroline Amelia Cranch
- Born: 1853
- Died: 1931 (aged 77–78)
- Known for: Painting

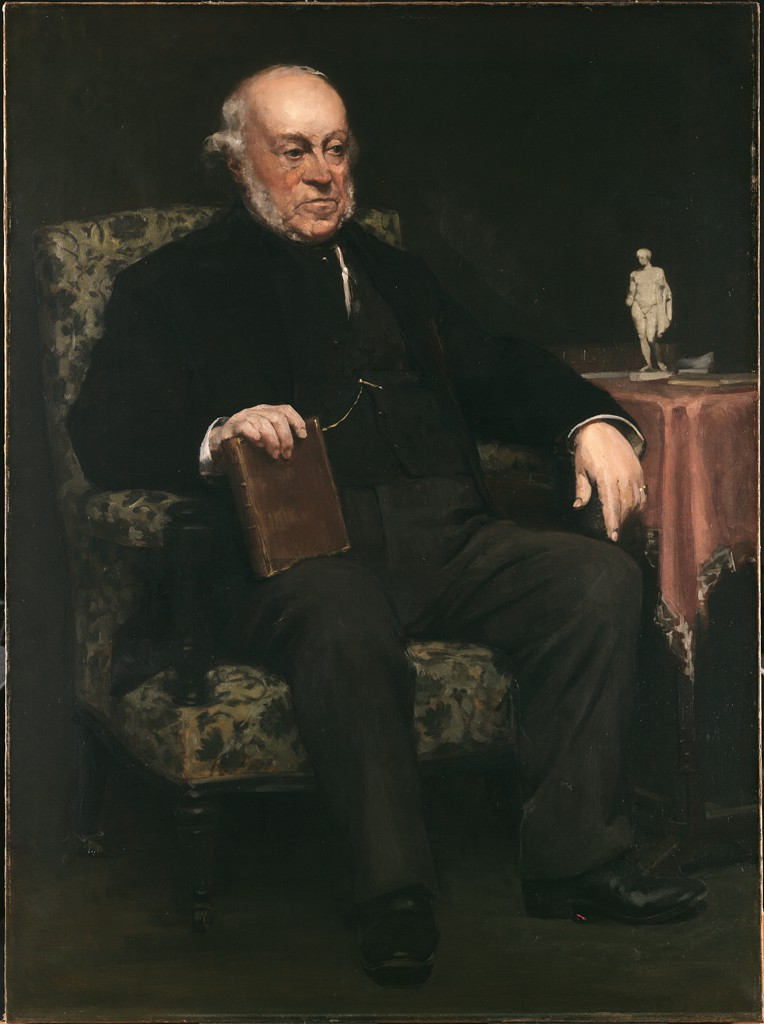
Frederic Henry Hedge, oil on canvas, 1883, in the collection of the Harvard Art Museums.

Caroline Cranch (1853 – 1931) was an American painter. She is known for her portraits.

== Biography ==
Cranch was born in 1853 in Fishkill, New York. She was the daughter of the Transcendental painter and writer Christopher Pearse Cranch. She studied at Cooper Union and the Art Students League of New York.

Cranch died in 1931.

Her portrait of William Henry Huntington is in the Metropolitan Museum of Art. Her portrait of Frederic Henry Hedge is in the Harvard Art Museums.
