= John Knowles Paine =

American composer (1839–1906)

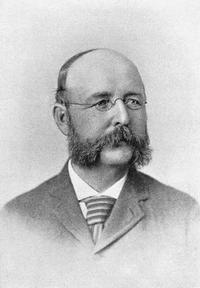
John Knowles Paine

John Knowles Paine (January 9, 1839 – April 25, 1906) was the first American-born composer to achieve fame for large-scale orchestral music. The senior member of a group of composers collectively known as the Boston Six, Paine was one of those responsible for the first significant body of concert music by composers from the United States. The Boston Six's other five members were Amy Beach, Arthur Foote, Edward MacDowell, George Chadwick, and Horatio Parker.

== Life ==
Paine grew up in a musical family in Maine. His grandfather, an instrument maker, built the first pipe organ in the state of Maine and his father and uncles were all music teachers. His father carried on the family musical instrument business. One uncle was an organist. Another was a composer. In the 1850s Paine took lessons in organ and composition from Hermann Kotzschmar, completing his first composition, a string quartet, in 1855 at the age of 16. After his first organ recital in 1857, he was appointed organist of Portland's Haydn Society, and gave a series of recitals with the object of funding a trip to Europe where he hoped to further his music education.

On arrival in Europe, Paine studied organ with Carl August Haupt and orchestration with Wilhelm Friedrich Wieprecht in Berlin. He also toured Europe giving organ recitals for three years, establishing a reputation as an organist that preceded his return to the United States. After returning to the US and settling in Boston in 1861, he was appointed Harvard's first university organist and choirmaster. While acting in this role, Paine offered free courses in music appreciation and music theory that became the core curriculum for Harvard's newly-formed academic music department (the first such department in the United States), and he was appointed as America's first music professor. He remained a member of the faculty of Harvard until 1905, just a year before his death.

Paine's well-received 1867 Berlin premiere of his Mass in D minor, Op. 10 gave him a reputation that helped him to shape the musical infrastructure of the United States. His pioneering courses in music appreciation and music theory made the curriculum of the Department of Music at Harvard a model for American departments of music. His service as a director of the New England Conservatory of Music (and the lectures he gave there) established his place at the root of an instruction chain that leads (through Eugene Thayer) from George Chadwick to Horatio Parker to Charles Ives. He was the first guest conductor of the Boston Symphony Orchestra in the final concerts of its first season, and his works were audience favorites. Paine is noted for beginning American's symphonic tradition. He also wrote the oratorio, St Peter in 1872, and the Centennial Hymn that (with orchestra) opened the 1876 Centennial Exposition in Philadelphia. He was a founder of the American Guild of Organists. His writings include the book The History of Music to the Death of Schubert (pub. 1885), and he was co-editor of the book Famous Composers and their Works (pub. 1891) to which he contributed two chapters "Beethoven as Composer" and "Music in Germany".

In 1889, Paine made one of the first musical recordings on wax cylinder with Theo Wangemann, who was experimenting with sound recording on the newly invented phonograph.

John Knowles Paine was among the initial class of inductees into the American Classical Music Hall of Fame in 1998.

The Grove Music Encyclopedia says of him:

... Paine served the Harvard community for 43 years. By his presence and by his serious concern with music in a liberal arts college, he awakened a regard for music among many generations of Harvard men. His writings testify to his insistence upon the place of music within the liberal arts...

Paine Hall, the concert hall for Harvard's Department of Music, is named after him. A history of that building includes many references to his pioneering role in music at Harvard.

== In popular culture ==
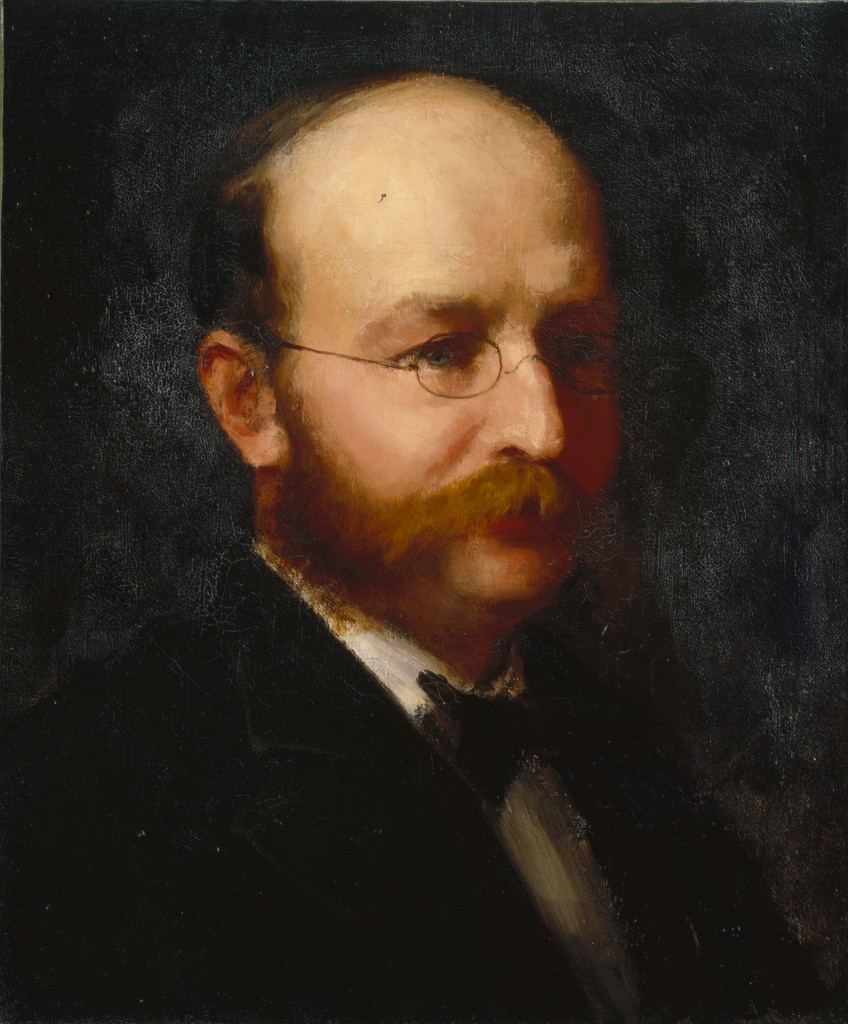
John Knowles Paine by Caroline Cranch c. 1885

At the end of the episode "A Long Ladder" (S01E04) of the HBO television series The Gilded Age, in a scene set in New York in 1882, the Boston Symphony Orchestra is shown under the composer's direction performing Paine's Symphony No. 2. The middle two movements are seen and heard in the episode: the Scherzo and the Adagio.

== Principal works ==
Opera

- Azara

Orchestral

- Symphony No. 1, Op. 23
- As You Like It, Overture, Op. 28
- The Tempest, Symphonic Poem, Op. 31
- Symphony No. 2 in A major "In Spring", Op. 34
- Prelude from Oedipus Tyrannus, Op. 35
- Poseidon and Amphitrite: an Ocean Fantasy, Op.44

Chorus and Orchestra

- Freedom, Our Queen
- Domine salvum fac Praesidem nostrum, Op.8
- Mass in D minor, Op. 10
- St. Peter: An Oratorio, Op. 20 (1872)
- Centennial Hymn, Op. 27 (1876)
- Oedipus Tyrannus, Op. 35
- The Realm of Fancy, Op. 36
- Phoebus, Arise!, Op. 37

Organ

- Concert Variations on "The Star-Spangled Banner", [Op. 1] – 1861
- Concert Variations on the Austrian Hymn, Op. 3 #1
- Fantasy on Ein feste Burg, Op. 13
- Prelude in B minor, Op. 19 #2
- Fugue in C minor (from Four Pieces)

Hymn Tune

- Harvard Hymn (tune used for a text beginning "Deus omnium creator" by James Bradstreet Greenough, customarily sung by the assembly at ceremonies conferring Harvard degrees)

== See also ==
- Il Pesceballo

== Archives ==
- John Knowles Paine scrapbook, musical scores and photographs, 1859-1906 at Isham Memorial Library, Harvard University
