= List of compositions by Amy Beach =

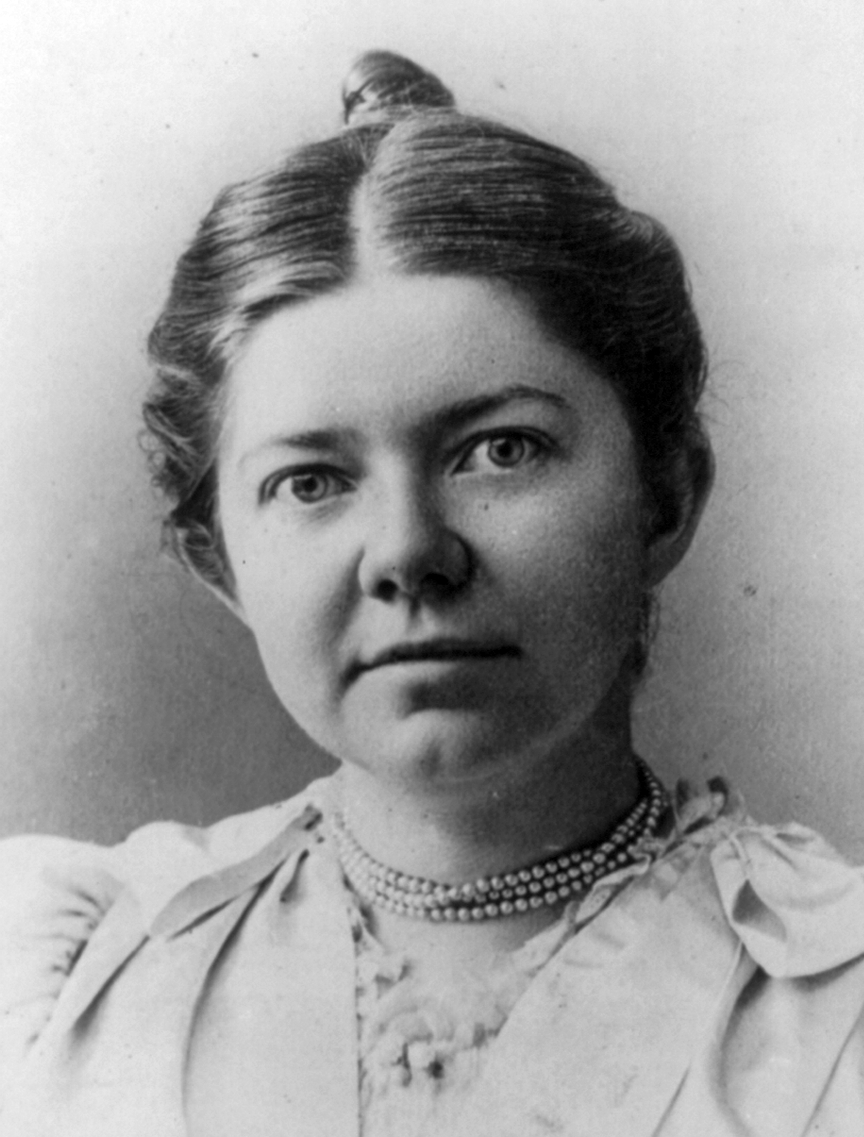

This is a list of compositions by Amy Beach (1867–1944), mostly issued under the name Mrs. H.H.A. Beach.

== Opera ==
- Cabildo (N.B. Stephens), solo voices, chorus, speaker, violin, cello, piano, 1932; Athens, Georgia, 27 Feb 1945, Op. 149

== Orchestral (including with voice) ==
- Eilende Wolken, Segler der Lüfte (F. von Schiller), alto, orchestra, 1892, vocal score (1892), Op. 18
- Bal masque, performed 1893, version for piano (1894), Op. 22
- Gaelic Symphony, e, 1894–6, full score (1897), Op. 32
- Piano Concerto, c♯, 1899, arr. 2 piano (1900), Op. 45
- Jephthah's Daughter (Mollevaut, after Bible: Judges xi.38, It. trans., I. Martinez, Eng. trans., A.M. Beach), soprano, orchestra, vocal score (1903), Op. 53

== Chamber ==
- Romance, Op. 23 (1893), for violin and piano
- Violin Sonata in A minor, Op. 34, 1896 (1899), transcr. viola, piano; transcr. flute, piano
- Three Compositions, Op. 40/1 (1898), for violin and piano, arr. cello (1903): La Captive, Berceuse, Mazurka.
- Invocation, Op. 55 (1904), for violin, piano/organ, cello obbligato
- Piano Quintet in F♯ minor, Op. 67, 1907
- Theme and Variations, Op. 80, 1916 (1920), for flute, string quartet; ed. J. Graziano, American Chamber Music. Three Centuries of American Music, viii (1991)
- The Water Sprites, 1921, for flute, cello, piano; also arr. f. piano
- String Quartet, Op. 89, 1929; ed. A.F. Block, Music of the United States of America, iii (Madison, WI, 1994)
- Pastorale, Op. 90, 1921, for flute, cello, piano; arr. cello, organ; arr. cello, piano
- Suite for Two Pianos Founded upon Old Irish Melodies, Op. 104 (1924)
- Prelude, 1931, for violin, cello, piano [frag.]
- Lento espressivo, Op. 125, for violin and piano
- Piano Trio, Op. 150, 1938 (1939)
- Pastorale, Op. 151 (1942), for woodwind quintet

== Solo piano ==
- Valse Caprice, Op. 4 (1889)
- Ballade, Op. 6 (1894)
- Sketches, Op. 15 (1892)
- Bal Masque, Op. 22 (1894)
- Children's Carnival Op. 25 (1894)
- Three Pieces, Op. 28 (1894)
- Children's Album, Op. 36 (1897)
- Scottish Legend and Gavotte Fantastique, Op. 54 (1903)
- Variations on Balkan Themes, Op. 60 (1904)
- Four Eskimo Pieces, Op. 64 (1907)
- Les Rêves de Colombine, Op. 65 (1907)
- Prelude and Fugue, Op. 81 (1914)
- From Blackbird Hills, Op. 83 (1922)
- Fantasia Fugata, Op. 87 (1917)
- The Fair Hills of Eire, O, Op. 91 (1923)
- Hermit Thrush at Eve, at Morn, Op. 92 (1922)
- From Grandmother's Garden, Op. 97 (1922)
- Farewell Summer, Dancing Leaves, Op. 102 (1924)
- Old Chapel by Moonlight, Op. 106 (1924)
- Nocturne, Op. 107 (1924)
- A Cradle Song of the Lonely Mother, Op. 108 (1914)
- By the Still Waters, Op. 114
- Tyrolean Valse Fantaisie, Op. 116 (1924)
- From Six to Twelve, Op. 119 (1932)
- Three Pieces, Op. 128 (1932)
- Out of the Depths, Op. 130 (1932)
- Five Improvisations, Op. 148 (1938)
- A Bit of Cairo (c. 1928)

== Piano duet ==
- Three Movements (1883)
- Summer Dreams, Op. 47 (1901)

== Choral ==
=== Sacred choral ===
(4 voices and organ, unless stated otherwise)

- Mass, E♭, 4 voices, orchestra, 1890, orchestral score (1890), Op. 5
- Graduale (Thou Glory of Jerusalem), tenor, orchestra, piano score (1892) [addition to Mass, Op.5]
- O praise the Lord, all ye nations (Ps cxvii) (1891), Op. 7
- Choral Responses (1891): Nunc dimittis (Bible: Luke ii.29), With prayer and supplication (Bible: Philippians iv.6–7), Peace I leave with you (Bible: John iv.27), Op. 8/1
- Festival Jubilate (Ps c), D, 7 voices, orchestra, 1891, piano score (1892), Op. 17
- Bethlehem (G.C. Hugg) (1893), Op. 24
- Alleluia, Christ is risen (after M. Weisse, C.F. Gellert, T. Scott, T. Gibbons) (1895), arr. with violin obbligato (1904), Op. 27
- Teach me thy way (Ps lxxxvi.11–12), 1895, Op. 33
- Peace on earth (E.H. Sears) (1897), Op. 38
- Help us, O God (Pss lxxix.9, 5; xlv.6; xliv.26), 5 voices (1903), Op. 50
- A Hymn of Freedom: America (S.F. Smith), 4 voices, organ/piano (1903), rev. with text O Lord our God arise (1944), Op. 52
- Service in A, alto, soprano, alto, tenor, bass, 4 voices, organ: Te Deum, Benedictus (1905), rev. omitting Gloria, 1934; Jubilate Deo; Magnificat; Nunc dimittis (1906), Op. 63
- All hail the power of Jesus' name (E. Perronet), 4 voices, organ/piano, 1914 (1915), Op. 74
- Thou knowest, Lord (J. Borthwick), tenor, bass, 4 voices, organ (1915), Op. 76
- Canticles (1916): Bonum est, confiteri (Ps xcii. 1–4), soprano, 4 voices, organ; Deus misereatur (Ps lxvii); Cantate Domino (Ps xcviii); Benedic, anima mea (Ps ciii), Op. 78/1
- Te Deum, f, tenor, male chorus 3 voices, organ, 1921 (1922), Op. 84
- Constant Christmas (P. Brooks), soprano, alto, 4 voices, organ (1922), Op. 95
- The Lord is my shepherd (Ps xxiii), female chorus 3 voices, organ (1923), Op. 96
- I will lift up mine eyes (Ps cxxi), 4 voices (1923), Op. 98
- Benedictus es, Domine, Benedictus (Bible: Luke i.67–81), bass, 4 voices, organ (1924), Op. 103/1
- Let this mind be in you (Bible: Philippians ii.5–11), soprano, bass, 4 voices, organ (1924), Op. 105
- Lord of the worlds above (I. Watts), soprano, tenor, bass, 4 voices, organ (1925), Op. 109
- Around the Manger (R. Davis), 4 voices, organ/piano (1925), version for 1v, piano/organ (1925); rev. female chorus 3 voices, organ/piano (1925), rev. female chorus 4 voices, organ/piano (1929), Op. 115
- Benedicite omnia opera Domini (Bible: Daniel iii.56–8) (1928), Op. 121
- Communion Responses: Kyrie, Gloria tibi, Sursum corda, Sanctus, Agnus Dei, Gloria, soprano, alto, tenor, bass, 4 voices, organ (1928), Op. 122
- Agnus Dei, SA, chorus, organ/piano (1936) [suppl. to Op.122]
- The Canticle of the Sun (St Francis), soprano, mezzo-soprano, tenor, bass, 4 voices, orchestra, 1924, orchestral score (1928), Op. 123
- Evening Hymn: The shadows of the evening hours (A. Procter), soprano, alto, 4 voices, 1934 (1936), Op. 125/2
- Christ in the universe (A. Meynell), alto, tenor, 4 voices, orchestra, orchestral score (1931), Op. 132
- Four Choral Responses (J. Fischer) (1932), Op. 133
- God is our stronghold (E. Wordsworth), soprano, 4 voices, organ, Op. 134
- Hearken unto me (Bible: Isaiah li.1, 3; xliii.1–3; xl.28, 31), soprano, alto, tenor, bass, 4 voices, orchestra, orchestral score (1934), Op. 139
- O Lord, God of Israel (Bible: 1 Kings viii.23, 27–30, 34), soprano, alto, bass, 4 voices, 1935, Op. 141
- Lord of all being (O.W. Holmes) (1938), Op. 146
- I will give thanks (Ps cxi), soprano, 4 voices, organ (1939), Op. 147
- Hymn: O God of love, O King of peace (H.W. Baker), 4 voices, 1941 (1942)
- Pax nobiscum (E. Marlatt), (female chorus 3 voices)/(male chorus 3 voices/4vv), organ (1944)

=== Secular choral ===
- The Little Brown Bee (M. Eytinge), female chorus 4 voices (1891), Op. 9
- Singing Joyfully (J.W. Chadwick), children's chorus 2 voices, piano
- The Minstrel and the King: Rudolph von Habsburg (F. von Schiller), tenor, bass, male chorus 4 voices, orchestra, piano score (1890), Op. 16
- Wouldn't that be queer (E.J. Cooley), female chorus 3 voices, piano (1919) [arr. of song], Op. 26/4
- An Indian Lullaby (anon.), female chorus 4 voices (1895)
- The Rose of Avon-Town (C. Mischka), soprano, alto, female chorus 4 voices, orchestra, piano score (1896), Op. 30
- Three Flower Songs (M. Deland), female chorus 4 voices, piano (1896): The Clover, The Yellow Daisy, The Bluebell, Op. 31/1
- Fairy Lullaby (W. Shakespeare), female chorus 4 voices (1907), Op. 37/3
- Three Shakespeare Choruses, female chorus 4 voices, piano (1897): Over hill, over dale, Come unto these yellow sands, Through the house give glimmering light, Op. 39/1
- Song of Welcome (H.M. Blossom), 4 voices, orchestra, orchestral score (1898), Op. 42
- Far Awa' (R. Burns), female chorus 3 voices, piano (1918) [arr. of song], Op. 43/4
- The year's at the spring (R. Browning), female chorus 4 voices, piano (1909); Ah, love, but a day (Browning), female chorus 4 voices, piano (1927), Op. 44/1
- Sylvania: a Wedding Cantata (F.W. Bancroft, after W. Bloem), soprano, S, alto, tenor, bass, 8 voices, orchestra, piano score (1901), Op. 46
- A Song of Liberty (F.L. Stanton), 4 voices, orchestra, 1902, piano score (1902), arr. male chorus 4 voices, piano (1917), Op. 49
- Juni (E. Jensen), 4 voices, piano (1931), version for female chorus 3 voices (1931) [arr. of song], Op. 51/3
- Shena Van (W. Black), female chorus 3 voices/male chorus 4 voices (1917) [arr. of song], Op. 56/4
- Only a Song (A.L. Hughes), One Summer Day (Hughes), female chorus 4 voices (1904), Op. 57/1
- The Sea-Fairies (A. Tennyson), soprano, alto, female chorus 2 voices, orchestra, organ ad lib, 1904, piano score (1904), arr. harp, piano, Op. 59
- The Chambered Nautilus (Holmes), soprano, alto, female chorus 4 voices, orchestra, organ ad lib, piano score (1907), ed. A.F. Block (Bryn Mawr, PA, 1994), Op. 66
- Panama Hymn (W.P. Stafford), 4 voices, orchestra, arr. 4 voices, organ/piano (1915), Op. 74
- The Candy Lion (A.F. Brown), Dolladine (W.B. Rands), female chorus 4 voices (1915) [arrs. of songs], Op. 75/1
- Friends (Brown), children's chorus 2 voices (1917)
- Balloons (L.A. Garnett) children's chorus (1916)
- Dusk in June (S. Teasdale), female chorus 4 voices (1917), Op. 82
- May Eve, 4 voices, piano, 1921 (1933), Op. 86
- Three School Songs, 4 voices (1933), Op. 94
- Peter Pan (J. Andrews), female chorus 3 voices, piano (1923), Op. 101
- The Greenwood (W.L. Bowles), 4 voices (1925), Op. 110
- The Moonboat (E.D. Watkins), children's chorus (1938), Who has seen the wind (C. Rossetti), children's chorus 2 voices (1938), Op. 118/1
- Sea Fever (J. Masefield), The Last Prayer, male chorus 4 voices, piano (1931), Op. 126/1
- When the last sea is sailed (Masefield), male chorus 4 voices (1931), Op. 127
- Drowsy Dream Town (R. Norwood), soprano, female chorus 3 voices, piano (1932), Op. 129
- We who sing have walked in glory (A.S. Bridgman), 1934 (1934), Op. 140
- This morning very early (P.L. Hills), female chorus 3 voices, piano, 1935 (1937), Op. 144
- The Ballad of the P.E.O. (R.C. Mitchell) female chorus, 1944

== Songs ==
(for single voice and piano, unless stated otherwise)

- Four Songs: With violets (K. Vannah) (1885), Die vier Brüder (F. von Schiller) (1887), Jeune fille et jeune fleur (F.R. Chateaubriand) (1887), Ariette (P.B. Shelley) (1886), Op. 1/1
- Three Songs: Twilight (A.M. Beach) (1887), When far from her (H.H.A. Beach) (1889), Empress of night (H.H.A. Beach) (1891), Op. 2/1
- Songs of the Sea (1890): A Canadian Boat Song (T. Moore), soprano, bass, piano; The Night Sea (H.P. Spofford), soprano, S, piano; Sea Song (W.E. Channing), soprano, S, piano, Op. 10/1
- Three Songs (W.E. Henley): Dark is the night (1890), The Western Wind (1889), The Blackbird (1889), Op. 11/1
- Three Songs (R. Burns): Wilt thou be my dearie? (1889) Ye banks and braes o' bonnie doon (1891), My luve is like a red, red rose, 1887 (1889), Op. 12/1
- Hymn of Trust (O.W. Holmes) (1891), rev. with violin obbligato (1901), Op. 13
- Four Songs, 1890 (1891): The Summer Wind (W. Learned), Le secret (J. de Resseguier), Sweetheart, sigh no more (T.B. Aldrich), The Thrush (E.R. Sill); nos.2–3 rev. (1901), Op. 14/1
- Three Songs (1893): For me the jasmine buds unfold (F.E. Coates), Ecstasy (A.M. Beach), 1v, piano, violin obbligato, Golden Gates, Op. 19/1
- (Villanelle) Across the World (E.M. Thomas) (1894), arr. 1v, cello obbligato, Op. 20
- Three Songs (1893): Chanson d'amour (V. Hugo), arr. 1v, orchestra, arr. 1v, cello obbligato (1899), Extase (Hugo), Elle et moi (F. Bovet), Op. 21/1
- Four Songs (1894): My Star (C. Fabbri), Just for this (Fabbri), Spring (Fabbri), Wouldn't that be queer (E.J. Cooley); no.4 arr. chorus (1919), Op. 26/1
- Four Songs, 1894 (1895): Within thy heart (A.M. Beach), The Wandering Knight (anon., Eng. trans., J.G. Lockhart), Sleep, little darling (Spofford), Haste, O beloved (W.A. Sparrow), Op. 29/1
- Four Songs, 1896 (1897): Nachts (C.F. Scherenberg), Allein! (H. Heine), Nähe des Geliebten (J.W. von Goethe), Forget-me-not (H.H.A. Beach), Op. 35/1
- Three Shakespeare Songs (1897): O mistress mine, Take, O take those lips away, Fairy Lullaby; no.3 arr. chorus (1907), Op. 37/1
- Three Songs (1898): Anita (Fabbri), Thy beauty (Spofford), Forgotten (Fabbri), Op. 41/1
- Five Burns Songs (1899): Dearie, Scottish Cradle Song, Oh were my love yon lilac fair!, Far awa', My lassie; no.3 arr. 2 soprano, piano (1918); no.4 arr. chorus (1918), arr. 2 voices (1918), arr. female voices (1918), arr. organ, 1936, arr. piano, 1936, Op. 43/1
- Three [R.] Browning Songs (1900): The year's at the spring, Ah, love but a day, I send my heart up to thee; no.1 arr. soprano, alto, piano (1900), arr. chorus (1928), arr. female voices (1928), arr. 1v, piano, violin (1900), arr. male chorus, piano (1933); no.2 arr. alto, bass, piano (1917), arr. soprano, tenor, piano (1917), arr. 1v, piano, violin (1920), arr. chorus by H. Norden (1949), nos.1–2 arr. chorus (1927), Op. 44/1
- Four Songs (1902): Come, ah come (H.H.A. Beach), Good Morning (A.H. Lockhart), Good Night (Lockhart), Canzonetta (A. Sylvestre), Op. 48/1
- Four Songs (1903): Ich sagete nicht (E. Wissman); Wir drei (H. Eschelbach), Juni (E. Jansen), Je demande à l'oiseau (Sylvestre); no.3 arr. voice, piano, violin (1903), arr. 1v, orchestra, arr. chorus (1931), Op. 51/1
- Four Songs, 1903–4 (1904): Autumn Song (H.H.A. Beach), Go not too far (F.E. Coates), I know not how to find the spring (Coates), Shena Van (W. Black); no.4 arr. chorus (1917), arr. with violin obbligato (1919), Op. 56/1
- Give me not love (Coates), soprano, tenor, piano (1905), Op. 61
- When soul is joined to soul (E.B. Browning) (1905), Op. 62
- After (Coates) (1909), arr. violin, cello, arr. alto, chorus, 1936, arr. soprano, alto, chorus, organ, 1936, Op. 68
- Two Mother Songs (1908): Baby (G. MacDonald), Hush, baby dear (A.L. Hughes), Op. 69/1
- Three Songs (1910): A Prelude (A.M. Beach), O sweet content (T. Dekker), An Old Love-Story (B.L. Stathem), Op. 71/1
- Two Songs (1914): Ein altes Gebet, perf. 1914, Deine Blumen (L. Zacharias), Op. 72/1
- Two Songs (Zacharias) (1914): Grossmütterchen, Der Totenkranz, Op. 73/1
- The Candy Lion (A.F. Brown), A Thanksgiving Fable (D. Herford), Dolladine (W.B. Rands), Prayer of a Tired Child (Brown) (1914); nos.1, 3 arr. female chorus (1915), Op. 75/1
- Two Songs (1914): Separation (J.L. Stoddard), The Lotos Isles (Tennyson), Op. 76/1
- Two Songs (1916): I (C. Fanning), Wind o' the Westland (D. Burnett), Op. 77/1
- Three Songs (1917): Meadowlarks (I. Coolbrith), Night Song at Amalfi (Teasdale), In Blossom Time (Coolbrith), Op. 78/1
- A Song for Little May (E.H. Miller), 1922
- The Arrow and the Song (H.W. Longfellow), 1922
- Clouds (F.D. Sherman), 1922
- In the Twilight (Longfellow) (1922), Op. 85
- Spirit Divine (A. Read), soprano, tenor, organ (1922), Op. 88
- Message (Teasdale) (1922), Op. 93
- Four Songs (1923): When Mama Sings (A.M. Beach), Little Brown-Eyed Laddie (A.D.O. Greenwood), The Moonpath (K. Adams), The Artless Maid (L. Barili), Op. 99/1
- Two Songs (1924): A Mirage (B. Ochsner); Stella viatoris (J.H. Nettleton), soprano, violin, cello, piano, Op. 100/1
- Jesus my Saviour (A. Elliott) (1925), Op. 112
- Mine be the lips (L. Speyer) (1921), Op. 113
- Around the Manger (Davis), 1v, piano/organ (1925), also version for chorus, Op. 115
- Three Songs (M. Lee) (1925): The Singer, The Host, Song in the Hills, Op. 117/1
- Birth (E.L. Knowles), 1926
- Rendezvous (Speyer), 1v, violin obbligato (1928), Op. 120
- Mignonnette (1929)
- Springtime (S.M. Heywood) (1929), Op. 124
- Two Sacred Songs: Spirit of Mercy (anon.) (1930), Evening Hymn: The shadows of the evening hours (A. Procter) (1934); no.2 arr. chorus (1936), Op. 125/1
- Dark Garden (Speyer) (1932), Op. 131
- To one I love (1932), Op. 135
- Fire and Flame (A.A. Moody), 1932 (1933), Op. 136
- Baby (S.R. Quick); May Flowers (Moody); 1932 (1933), Op. 137/1
- Evening song, 1934
- April Dreams (K.W. Harding), 1935
- The Deep Sea Pearl (E.M. Thomas), 1935
- I sought the Lord (anon.), 1v, organ, 1936 (1937), Op. 142
- I shall be brave (Adams) (1932), Op. 143
- Dreams, Op. 145
- Though I Take the Wings of Morning (R.N. Spencer), 1v, organ/piano (1941), Op. 152
- The heart that melts
- The Icicle Lesson
- If women will not be inclined
- Time has wings and swiftly flies
- Whither (W. Müller) [after Chopin: Trois nouvelles études, no.3]
- Du sieh'st, bass, piano [fragment]
