= Harriet P. Sawyer =

American composer

Harriet Priscilla Sawyer Achorn (11 November 1862 – 20 May 1934) was an American composer who wrote mostly songs and some educational pieces for children. She was also known as Hattie, and published most of her music under the name Harriet P. Sawyer.

== Life and career ==
Sawyer was born in St. Louis, Missouri, to Harriet Adams Hayes and Melville Sawyer. Little is known about her education, although her obituary stated that she "received her musical education in various European cities." In 1897, George Whitefield Chadwick dedicated his song “The Rose Leans Over the Pool” to Sawyer. She married John Warren Achorn in 1907. In 1913, they were living in Boston. She died in Pinebluff, North Carolina on 20 May 1934.

Sawyer's music was published by Arthur P. Schmidt and G. Schirmer Inc.

== List and compositions ==
=== Chamber ===
- Five Pieces for Violin and Piano
- Happy Jack Tunes for Little Fiddlers
- Little Soldier Tunes
- Mazurka

=== Vocal ===
- “Across the Dreary Sea”
- “Barcarole” (text by Adolf Licht; included in Vier Lieder collection)
- “Christmas Bells” (text by Henry Wadsworth Longfellow)
- “Die ersten Tropfen fallen” (text by Matthias Jacob Schleiden writing as Ernst; included in Vier Lieder collection)
- “Ich will meine Seele tauchen” (text by Heinrich Heine; included in Vier Lieder collection)
- “In meiner Brust da sitzt win Weh” (text by Heinrich Heine; included in Vier Lieder collection)
- “She Walks in Beauty”
- “Slumber Song”
- Thou art the Rest (arranged for solo voice and piano, and for SATB choir)
- “When Shall We Meet Again?”
- “Who'll Tell?”
- “Willie Darling”
