= Piano Concerto (Beach) =

1899 composition by Amy Beach

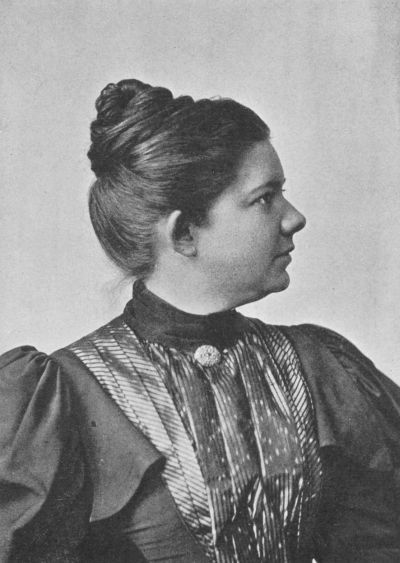
Beach in 1908

The Piano Concerto in C♯ minor, Op. 45, is a composition for solo piano and orchestra in four movements by the American composer Amy Beach. The work was composed between September 1898 and September 1899. It was first performed in Boston on April 7, 1900, with the composer as the soloist and the Boston Symphony Orchestra performing under the conductor Wilhelm Gericke. The composition is dedicated to the musician Teresa Carreño and was the first piano concerto by an American female composer.

== Composition ==
=== Structure and origins ===
The concerto has a duration of roughly 37 minutes and is composed in four movements:

1. Allegro moderato
2. Scherzo: Vivace (Perpetuum mobile)
3. Largo
4. Allegro con scioltezza

The first movement "Allegro moderato" is composed in sonata form and is the longest of the four movements. The second theme of this movement is based on Beach's song "Jeune fille et jeune fleur", Op. 1, No. 3. The "Scherzo" is based on Beach's song "Empress of Night", Op. 2, No. 3, originally set to a poem by her husband Henry Beach and dedicated to her mother Clara Cheney, née Marcy. Likewise, the somber third movement "Largo" is based on Beach's song "Twilight", Op. 2, No. 1, and is dedicated to her husband, whose poetry again served as the original text. The fourth movement "Allegro con scioltezza" recalls the theme from the third movement while ushering in an exuberant finale.

=== Instrumentation ===
The work is scored for solo piano and an orchestra comprising two flutes (doubling piccolo), two oboes, two clarinets (doubling bass clarinet), two bassoons, four horns, two trumpets, three trombones, tuba, timpani, and strings.

== Reception ==
About the 1900 premiere, the critic Philip Hale wrote that it was "a disappointment in nearly every way," despite expectations based on the Gaelic Symphony. Dedicatee Teresa Carreño wrote a friendly letter to Beach but because of objections from her manager, did not perform the concerto. Beach had to become her own apostle for the piece and in 1913—1917 played the solo part in it with nine different orchestras, including some notable successes in Germany.

The Piano Concerto has been praised as an overlooked masterwork by modern critics. Phil Greenfield of The Baltimore Sun called it "a colorful, dashing work that might become extremely popular if enough people get a chance to hear it." Joshua Kosman of the San Francisco Chronicle also lauded the composition, writing:

Its four movements are packed with incident -- beautifully shaped melodies (several of them drawn from her songs), a forthright rhythmic profile and a vivacious and sometimes contentious interplay between soloist and orchestra. The piano part is as flashy and demanding as a virtuoso vehicle calls for, but there is also an element of poignancy about it -- a sense of constraint that seems to shadow even the work's most extroverted passages.

Andrew Achenbach of Gramophone similarly declared it "ambitious" and "singularly impressive", remarking:

An expansively rhetorical Allegro moderato launches the work before a playful perpetuum mobile scherzo and moody Largo (described by its creator as a 'dark, tragic lament'); the finale (which follows without a break) goes with a delightful swing. In fact, it's a rewarding achievement all round, full of brilliantly idiomatic solo writing (Beach was a virtuoso pianist herself and performed the work many times) and lent further autobiographical intrigue by its assimilation of thematic material from three early songs.

== See also ==
- List of compositions by Amy Beach

== Sources ==
- Block, Adrienne Fried (1998). Amy Beach, Passionate Victorian: The Life and Work of an American Composer, 1867-1944. Oxford University Press. pp. 131–145. ISBN 0195137841.
