= Alice Locke Pittman =

Alice Locke Pittman Wesley (15 September 1868 - 2 Jan 1936) was an American composer, poet and voice teacher. She composed songs and music for violin through at least opus 25. She published under the name Alice Locke Pittman.

Pittman was born in Bristol, Rhode Island, to Myra Gifford Adams and Samuel Pittman. She studied music with Anna Miller Wood, and married Raymond Wesley in 1896.

The Musical Courier described Pittman in 1907 as “one of the best known voice teachers in Providence, Rhode Island.” Arthur Foote dedicated his song “O My Luve's Like a Red, Red Rose” to her. Her music was published by A. P. Schmidt and E. C. Schirmer, and her works included:

== Chamber ==
- Melody in B Flat, opus 25 (violin and piano)
- violin pieces

== Poetry ==
- Good Night

== Vocal ==
- “Bright Smiles the Sun”
- “Confession”
- “Good Night“
- “Spinning Song” (text by William H. Gardner)
- “The Roe”
