= Second New England School =

Group of classical-music composers in New England

The Second New England School or New England Classicists (sometimes specifically the Boston Six) is a name given by music historians to a group of classical-music composers who lived during the late-19th and early-20th centuries in New England, United States. More specifically, they were based in and around Boston, Massachusetts, then an emerging musical center. The Second New England School is viewed by musicologists as pivotal in the development of an American classical idiom that stands apart from its European ancestors.

== Origin of the name ==
The Boston Classicists were first referred to as a "school" in the second edition of Gilbert Chase's America’s Music (1966).

We must attempt to define the prevailing New England attitude toward musical art, that is to say, the attitude that dominated the musical thinking of those New England composers who, in the final decade of the nineteenth century and the first of the twentieth, succeeded in forming a rather impressive school variously known as the “Boston Classicists” or the “New England Academicians.” It might be denied that they formed a “school” in the strictest sense of the term.... I think it can be shown that it stemmed from a fairly homogeneous cultural and aesthetical background.

The full-fledged term "Second New England School" was used by H. Wiley Hitchcock soon afterwards, in 1969, generating the term "First New England School" as a by-product.

No actual organization or conscious association of composers existed in the Second New England School, though some male members of the group did gather socially, so its "membership" can only be approximated by musicologists who draw aesthetic and philosophical links between composers.

== Members ==
The specific "Boston Six" are named as John Knowles Paine (1839–1906), Arthur Foote (1853–1937), George Chadwick (1854–1931), Amy Beach (1867–1944), Edward MacDowell (1861–1908), and Horatio Parker (1863–1919). Other composers associated with the group include Edgar Stillman Kelley (1857–1944), George Whiting (1861–1944), and Arthur Batelle Whiting (1861–1936). These composers were greatly influenced by German Romantic tradition, either through direct study with Germans or by association with German-trained musicians in America. Their works were published by Arthur P. Schmidt, the most important music publisher of that time.

== Origins in the First New England School ==
Chamber music of the Second New England School is considered the first successful body of American repertoire. While there was no official "First New England School," many independent composers heavily influenced the development and success of The Second New England School. The first influential figure was William Billings (1746–1800), a native of Boston, who was a self-taught amateur musician and a tanner. William Billings was part of the colonial working class and lacked the benefit of much formal education, let alone the chance of attending college (which remained a privilege of the genteel class). Billings gave expression to a provincial, American culture instead of aspiring to the cosmopolitan ideal of British culture. At the age of twenty-three Billings had already composed more than one hundred original pieces of sacred music, and in 1770 he published his first tunebook, The New England Psalm Singer. Only a dozen or so American-composed tunes had previously been published. Collecting more than 120 new compositions, The New England Psalm Singer was the first published compilation of entirely American music and the first tunebook composed by one American composer. Perhaps even more significant as a sign of both Billings's intentions and the times in which he lived, he advertised the work as “never before published” and stressed that it was composed by “a native of Boston”—made in America by an American. Published by Benjamin Edes and John Gill, who also published The Boston Gazette and Country Journal, a major Patriot newspaper, and including an engraving by Paul Revere, the book suggested that Billings was strongly aligned with the Rebels. His tunebook is striking for the manner in which it boldly signals these nationalist sentiments. For example, Billings's best-known tune, “Chester,”declares:

Let tyrant shake their iron rod

And slav'ry Clank her galling Chains

We fear them not we trust in God

New Englands God for ever reigns.

His most significant contribution to the history of American music was the publication of his two tune-books. The first one, the New England Psalm-Singer, was published in 1770, and the second and more popular collection, the Singing Master’s Assistant, was published in 1778. It includes a paraphrase of Psalm 137 that refers to the occupation of Boston in 1775–1776. These selections captured the mood of confident defiance with which New England patriots entered the new era.

== Influence of Lowell Mason ==
The second influential figure was Lowell Mason (1792–1872) born in Medfield, Massachusetts. His family education was rooted in the New England singing school tradition handed down by his grandfather. In 1822 he published The Handel and Haydn Society’s Collection of Church Music. The first edition was published without attribution, but later editions acknowledged the Mason as editor. Mason returned to Boston in 1827, having negotiated a position as music director at three Boston churches. Between 1829 and 1869 he published about 20 further collections of hymns. Those collections favored adaptations of tunes by prominent European composers rather than the traditional rural hymn tunes. He expertly adapted the melodies of instrumental works from European masters such as Haydn, Beethoven, Mozart, and Schubert into his collections of sacred music and published them. By simplifying their musical content and harmonic language he introduced them to the American public. His compositions include the hymn tunes for "From Greenland’s Icy Mountains", "Nearer, My God, to Thee", and "My Faith Looks Up to Thee". Mason devoted his life to music as a composer, a publisher and, most significantly, a music educator. In 1832 he founded the Boston Academy of Music. In 1838, because of his insistence that singing should not be absent from children's education, the Boston School Committee added introductory music to the primary and secondary school curriculum, appointing Mason to lead the program.

== The Boston Six ==
American musicians such as William Billings and Lowell Mason educated and enriched aspiring musicians of their time such as George Chadwick and Horatio Parker. Amy Beach, George Chadwick, Arthur Foote, Edward MacDowell, John Knowles Paine and Horatio Parker collaborated and eventually became known as the Boston Six. In 1815, the Handel and Haydn Society was formed, followed by the Boston Academy of Music. In 1867, The New England Conservatory was founded. It is not surprising then, that Boston should have nurtured a tradition of musical composition and a group of composers who are often considered together a "school."

Many of the New England composers had academic affiliations and were among the pioneers of academic music education in the United States. John Knowles Paine, who served as the first Professor of Music at Harvard University, was considered as the leading compositional authority during his lifetime and, unofficially, the leader of this group. Paine held seniority in age and experience over most of his colleagues. Horatio Parker became Professor of Music at Yale University, and Edward MacDowell at Columbia University.

== Music education in relation to Europe ==
During the Second New England School's years of prominence, American musical education was still in its infancy. Americans often learned music theory and composition in Europe or from European musicians who had emigrated to the United States. As a result, large portions of American classical music written at the time reflect European influences, especially from Germany. Although America lagged in composition, in the second half of the 20th century the country developed permanent and robust opera and symphonic organizations and exceeded Europe in the quality of piano manufacture and piano ownership per capita.

== Influence on subsequent composers ==
The composers of the Second New England School are considered the artistic ancestors of later "academic" and "conservative" U.S. composers such as Walter Piston, Howard Hanson, Douglas Moore, and Carlisle Floyd. The Americanist nationalist school of Aaron Copland and Roy Harris has no direct connection except nationality. Some composers who were students of the Boston Classicists, such as Henry F. Gilbert (student of MacDowell) and Charles Ives (student of Parker), rejected much of their masters' styles and embarked in radical new vernacular directions.

== See also ==
- Boston School (music)
