= William Benjamin Dearborn Simmons =

American organ builder (1823–1876)

William Benjamin Dearborn Simmons (April 27, 1823 in Cambridge, Massachusetts – October 31, 1876 in Cambridge) was an American organ builder.

Simmons apprenticed under Thomas Appleton and founded his own business in 1845 along with Thomas McIntyre. From 1851 he ran the business alone, and in 1856 George Fisher became partner. From 1858 to 1860 he and John Henry Willcox were partners in the firm.

Simmons's organs were some of the first to use a full Swell division, and he was an innovator in the use of tempered tuning and of steam-powered machinery in construction. In the 1850s his organs took on more Germanic qualities. Among his most important instruments were the 1855 organ built for Dover Hall in Boston, the 1859 organ for Harvard University, and the 1860 organ for St. Paul's Cathedral in Louisville, Kentucky. Additionally, he built an organ in 1871 which now resides in the Holy Family Parish in Pawtucket, Rhode Island and is used as the centerpiece in services and concerts.
