= Amy Beach =

American composer and pianist (1867–1944)

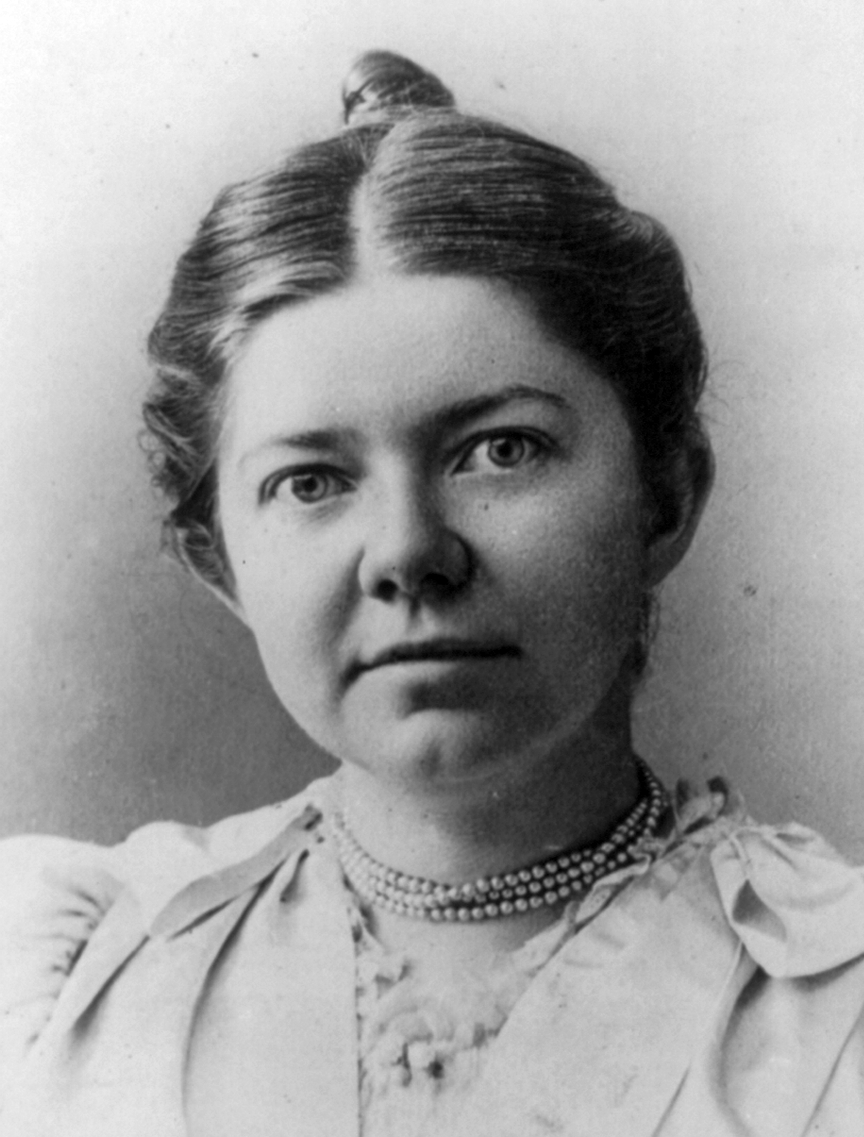
- Born: Amy Marcy Cheney; September 5, 1867; Henniker, New Hampshire, U.S.
- Died: December 27, 1944 (aged 77); New York City, U.S.
- Resting place: Forest Hills Cemetery
- Occupations: Composer; pianist
- Years active: 1883–1940
- Spouse: H. H. A. Beach (m. 1885; died 1910)

Signature
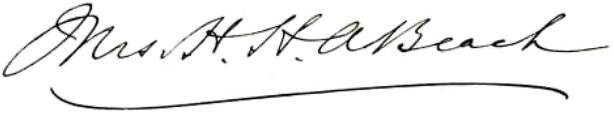

Amy Marcy Cheney Beach (September 5, 1867 – December 27, 1944) was an American composer and pianist. She was the first successful American female composer of large-scale art music.

Her Gaelic Symphony, premiered by the Boston Symphony Orchestra in 1896, was the first symphony composed and published by an American woman.

She was one of the first American composers of her era to succeed without the benefit of European training, and was known as one of the most respected American composers.

She was acclaimed for piano concerts she gave, featuring her own music, in the United States and Europe.

== Life ==
=== Early years and musical education ===
Amy Marcy Cheney was born in Henniker, New Hampshire, on September 5, 1867 to Charles Abbott Cheney (nephew of Oren B. Cheney, who co-founded Bates College) and Clara Imogene (Marcy) Cheney. Amy was an only child. Artistic ability ran in the family: Clara was reputedly an "excellent pianist and singer," while Amy showed every sign of being a child prodigy. She was able to sing forty songs accurately by age one, she was capable of improvising counter-melody by age two, and she taught herself to read at age three. At four, she composed three waltzes for piano during one summer at her grandfather's farm in West Henniker, NH, despite the absence of a piano; instead, she composed the pieces mentally and played them when she returned home.

Amy's mother, Clara, assisted her in writing her compositions, including a little piece for piano entitled "Mamma's Waltz.". It is thought that she may have possessed perfect pitch and experienced synesthesia. As a young girl, Beach would ask her parents to play music based on the color she associated the music with. She did not have a color for every major key, and could only associate color with two minor keys.

The family struggled to keep up with her musical interests and demands. Her mother sang and played for her, but attempted to prevent the child from playing the family piano herself, believing that to indulge the child's wishes in this respect would damage parental authority. Amy often commanded what music was played in the home, becoming enraged if it did not meet her standards.

Amy Beach began formal piano lessons with her mother at age six, and soon gave public recitals of works by Handel, Beethoven, and Chopin, as well as her own pieces. One such recital was reviewed in arts journal The Folio, and multiple agents proposed concert tours for the young pianist, which her parents declined – a decision for which Beach was later grateful.

In 1875, the Cheney family moved to Chelsea, a suburb just across the Mystic River from Boston. They were advised there to enroll Amy in a European conservatory, but opted instead for local training, hiring Ernst Perabo and later Carl Baermann (himself a student of Franz Liszt) as piano teachers. In 1881–82, the fourteen-year-old also studied harmony and counterpoint with Junius W. Hill. This would be her only formal instruction as a composer, but "[s]he collected every book she could find on theory, composition, and orchestration ... she taught herself ... counterpoint, harmony, fugue," even translating Gevaert's and Berlioz's French treatises on orchestration, considered "most composers' bibles," into English for herself.

=== Early career ===
Amy began performing publicly at age seven. At the age of thirteen, she wrote "The Rainy Day" following a visit with the poem's author, Longfellow. "The Rainy Day" was Amy's first published song. Amy Cheney made her concert debut at age sixteen on October 18, 1883, in a "Promenade Concert" conducted by Adolph Neuendorff at Boston's Music Hall, where she played Chopin's Rondo in E♭ and was piano soloist in Moscheles's piano concerto No. 3 in G minor, to general acclaim: as biographer Fried Block comments, "[i]t is hard to imagine a more positive critical reaction to a debut," and her audience was "enthusiastic in the extreme." The next two years of her career included performances in Chickering Hall, and she starred in the final performance of the Boston Symphony's 1884–85 season.

Beach would later recall one rehearsal for a Mendelssohn concerto in 1885, when the conductor slowed the orchestra during the last movement, attempting to go easy on the teenage soloist. When she began the piano part, however, she played at full prescribed tempo: "I did not know that he was sparing me, but I did know that the tempo dragged, and I swung the orchestra into time".

=== Marriage ===
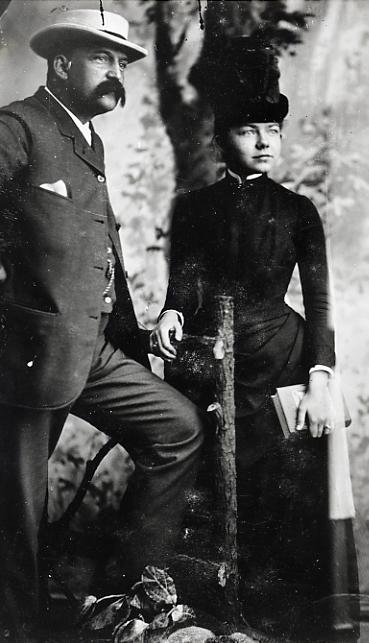

Beach was married the same year (1885) to Dr. Henry Harris Aubrey Beach (1843–1910), a Boston surgeon, Harvard lecturer, and amateur singer twenty-four years her senior (she was eighteen at the time). Her name would subsequently be listed on concert programs and published compositions as "Mrs. H. H. A. Beach."

The marriage was conditioned upon her willingness "to live according to his status, that is, function as a society matron and patron of the arts. She agreed never to teach piano, an activity widely associated with women" and regarded as providing "pin money." She further agreed to limit performances to two public recitals per year, with profits donated to charity, and to devote herself more to composition than to performance (although, as she wrote, "I thought I was a pianist first and foremost.") Her self-guided education in composition was also necessitated by Dr. Beach, who may have disapproved of his wife studying with a tutor. Restrictions like these were typical for middle- and upper-class women of the time: as it was explained to a European counterpart, Fanny Mendelssohn, "Music will perhaps become his [Fanny's brother Felix Mendelssohn's] profession, while for you it can and must be only an ornament.". Nevertheless, Beach wrote an article in The Etude titled, "Don't Give Up Music at the Altar" explaining the influence of the mother's role in music education with that of her own children.

In recollecting her married life in 1942, Beach stated, "I was happy and he was content" and "I belonged to a happy period that may never come again." Performing in Germany after Henry's death in 1910, she dropped the "Mrs. H. H. A." for "Amy", apparently because the "Mrs." mystified German audiences, but thereafter she used Mrs. H. H. A. Beach for the rest of her life.

=== Rise to prominence ===
A major compositional success came with her Mass in E♭ major, which was performed in 1892 by the Handel and Haydn Society orchestra, which since its foundation in 1815 had never performed a piece composed by a woman. Newspaper music critics responded to the Mass by declaring Beach one of America's foremost composers, comparing the piece to Masses by Cherubini and Bach.

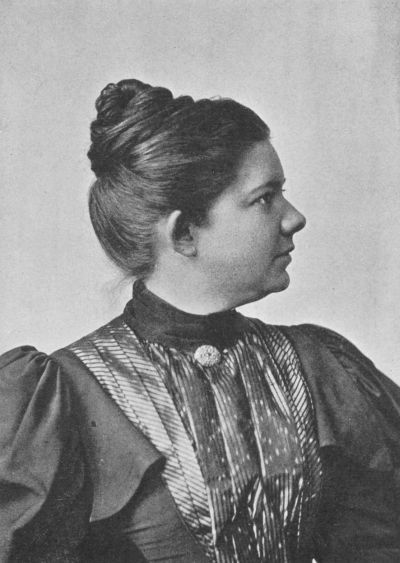
Beach in 1908

Beach followed this up with an important milestone in music history: her Gaelic Symphony, the first symphony composed and published by an American woman. It premiered October 30, 1896, performed by the Boston Symphony "with exceptional success," although "whatever the merits or defects of the symphony were thought to be, critics went to extraordinary lengths in their attempts to relate them to the composer's sex." Composer George Whitefield Chadwick (1854–1931) wrote to Beach that he and his colleague Horatio Parker (1863–1919) had attended the Gaelic Symphony's premiere and much enjoyed it: "I always feel a thrill of pride myself whenever I hear a fine work by any of us, and as such you will have to be counted in, whether you [like it] or not – one of the boys." These "boys" were a group of composers unofficially known as the Second New England School, and included not only Chadwick and Parker but also John Knowles Paine (1839–1926), Arthur Foote (1853–1937), and Edward MacDowell (1860–1908). With the addition of Beach, they collectively became known as the Boston Six, of whom Beach was the youngest.

In 1900, the Boston Symphony premiered Beach's Piano Concerto, with the composer as soloist. It has been suggested that the piece suggests Beach's struggles against her mother and husband for control of her musical life. In all, Beach was one of the first American women who received large popularity for composing symphonies.

=== Widowhood, years in Europe ===
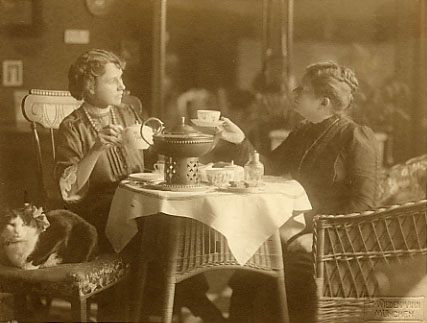
February 14, 1913. Marcella Craft & Amy Beach. Photographer: H. Wiedenmann, Munich.

Beach's husband died in June 1910 (the couple had been childless) and her mother 7 months later. Her father, Charles Cheney, had died in 1895. Beach felt unable to work for a while. She went to Europe in hopes of recovering there. In Europe she changed her name to "Amy Beach". She travelled together with Marcella (Marcia) Craft, an American soprano who was "prima donna of the Berlin Royal Opera." Beach's first year in Europe "was of almost entire rest." In 1912 she gradually resumed giving concerts, Her European debut was in Dresden, October 1912, playing her violin and piano sonata with violinist "Dr. Bülau," to favorable reviews. In Munich in January 1913, she gave a concert, again with her violin sonata, but with three sets of songs: two of her own and one by Brahms, and solo piano music by Bach, Beethoven, and Brahms. Two critics were rather unfavorable, one calling Beach's songs "kitschy." She was unfazed, saying the audience was "large and very enthusiastic." Demand arose for sheet music of Beach's songs and solo piano pieces, beyond the supply that Beach's publisher Arthur P. Schmidt had available for German music stores. Later In January, still in Munich, she performed in her Piano Quintet; a critic praised her composing, which he did not like all that well, more than her playing. In a further concert in Breslau, only three of Beach's songs were on the program, fewer than in Munich.

In November–December 1913 she played the solo part in her Piano Concerto with orchestras in Leipzig, Hamburg, and Berlin. Her Gaelic Symphony was also performed in Hamburg and Leipzig. A Hamburg critic wrote "we have before us undeniably a possessor of musical gifts of the highest kind; a musical nature touched with genius." She was greeted as the first American woman "able to compose music of a European quality of excellence."

=== Return to America and later life ===
Beach returned to America in 1914, not long after the beginning of World War I. Beach and Craft made pro-German statements to the American press, but Beach said her allegiance was to "the musical, not the militaristic Germany." She gave some manuscripts of music she had written in Europe to Craft, who brought them back to the U.S. Beach delayed her own departure until September 1914 and so had a further trunkful of manuscripts confiscated at the Belgian border. Beach eventually recovered the trunk and contents in 1929.

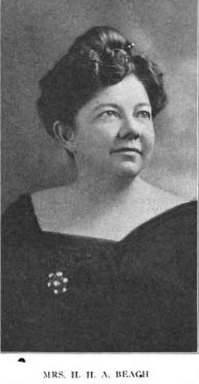
"Music News", 1917, Amy Beach, "Mrs. H. H. A. Beach"

In 1915, the Panama–Pacific International Exposition in San Francisco commemorated the opening of the Panama Canal and the city's recovery from the 1906 earthquake and fire. Amy Beach was honored often by concerts of her music and receptions during 1915, and her Panama Hymn was commissioned for the occasion. In 1915, and again in 1916, Beach visited her aunt Franc and cousin Ethel in San Francisco, who by then were her closest living relatives. About August 6, 1916, Beach, Franc, and Ethel left San Francisco together, leaving Franc's husband Lyman Clement behind, a "fifty-year-old marriage broken apart" for unknown reasons. The three women took up residence in Hillsborough, New Hampshire, where Franc and Beach's mother had been born. Beach's uncle, Clement, "was settled" in a Veterans' Home in California from 1917 until his death in 1922. After 1916, "Hillsborough was Beach's official residence: there she voted in presidential elections." In 1918, her cousin Ethel "developed a terminal illness," and she spent time taking care of her, as Franc, at age 75, "could hardly" do so by herself.

Aside from concert tours and the time of Ethel's illness until her death in 1920, Beach also spent part of her time in New York City. Someone had asked her if she was the daughter of Mrs. H. H. A. Beach. She resumed using that married name, but used "Amy Beach" on bookplates and stationery. For a few summers, she composed at her cottage in Centerville, Massachusetts on Cape Cod.

While continuing to get income from her compositions published by Arthur P. Schmidt, during 1914–1921, she had new compositions published by G. Schirmer. The Centerville cottage had been built on a five-acre property Beach had bought with royalties from one song, Ecstasy, 1892, her most successful composition up until then.

From 1921 on, she spent part of each summer as a Fellow at the MacDowell Colony in Peterborough, New Hampshire, where she composed several works and encountered other women composers and/or musicians, including Emilie Frances Bauer, Marion Bauer, Mabel Wheeler Daniels, Fannie Charles Dillon, and Ethel Glenn Hier, who "were or became long-time friends" of Beach. But there were "generational and gender divisions" among the Fellows in music at the Macdowell Colony, with some feeling that Beach's music was "no longer fashionable".

In 1924, Beach sold the house in Boston she had inherited from her husband. Her aunt Franc had become "feeble" around 1920, developed dementia in 1924, and died in November 1925 in Hillsborough, after which Beach had no surviving relatives as close as Ethel and Franc had been. In the fall of 1930, Beach rented a studio apartment in New York. There, she became the virtual composer-in-residence at St. Bartholomew's Episcopal Church. Her music had been used during the previous 20 years in services at the church, attributed to "H. H. A. Beach", with "Mrs." added only since 1931.

She used her status as the top female American composer to further the careers of young musicians. While she had agreed not to give private music lessons while married, Beach was able to work as a music educator during the early 20th century. She served as president of the board of councillors of the New England Conservatory of Music. She worked to coach and give feedback to various young composers, musicians, and students. Beach acted as a mentor for these young composers, encouraging them to spend time perfecting their craft through laborious practices. Written in her document, "Music's Ten Commandments as Given for Young Composers," Beach suggested young musicians spare no time analyzing works from every genre, their technical progress, and to employ variety whenever possible. From 1904 to 1943, Beach published numerous articles focusing on programming, preparation, and studying techniques for serious piano players, basing many of her findings on her own practice routine. Given her status and advocacy for music education, she was in high demand as a speaker and performer for various educational institutions and clubs, such as the University of New Hampshire, where she received an honorary master's degree in 1928. She also worked to create "Beach Clubs," which helped teach and educate children in music. She served as leader of some organizations focused on music education and women, including the Society of American Women Composers as its first president in 1925.

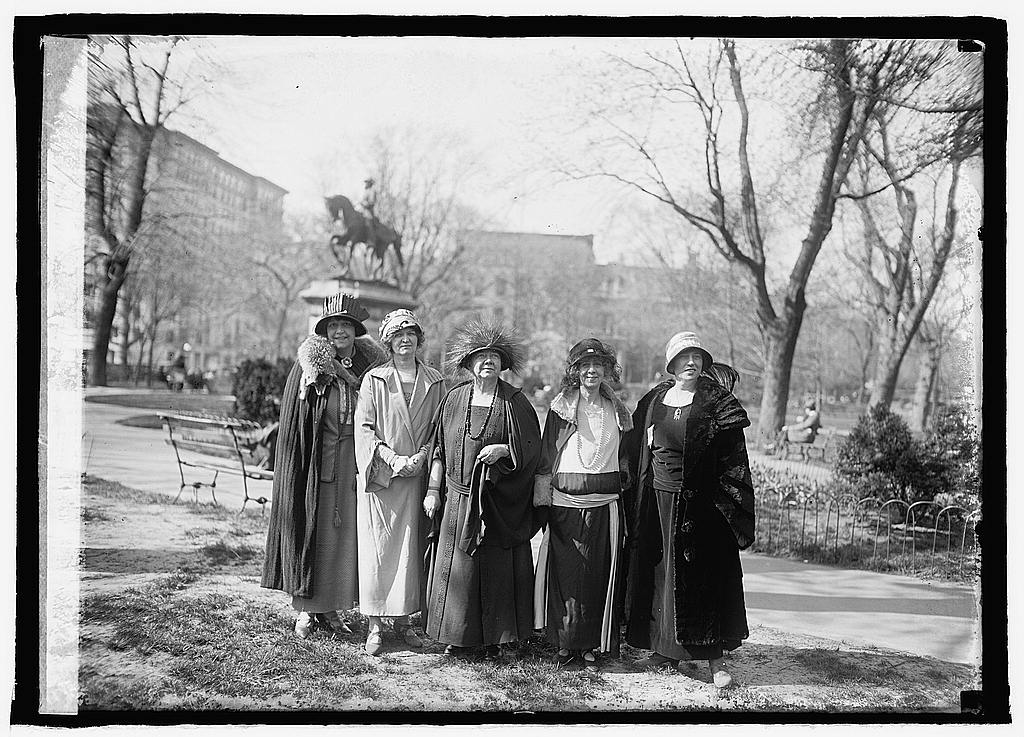
Phyllis Fergus (1887–1964), Ethel Glenn Hier (1889–1971), Amy Beach (1867–1944), Harriet Ware (1878–1972), and Gena Branscombe (1881–1977) in McPherson Square, Washington, D.C.

Beach spent the winter and spring of 1928–29 in Rome. She went to concerts "almost daily" and found Respighi's Feste Romane to be "superbly brilliant," but disliked a piece by Paul Hindemith. In March 1929 she gave a concert to benefit the American Hospital in Rome, in which her song "The Year's at the Spring" was encored and a "large sum of money" was raised. Beach, like her friends in Rome, briefly became an admirer of the Italian dictator Mussolini. She returned to the United States with a two-week stopover in Leipzig, where she met her old friend, the singer Marcella Craft. In 1942, Boston sculptor Bashka Paeff created a bust of her as a commission by the League of American Pen-Women. The piece was donated to Washington's Phillips Collection.

She was a member of Chapter R (New York City) of the P.E.O. Sisterhood. Late in her life, she collaborated on the "Ballad of P.E.O." with the words written by Ruth Comfort Mitchell, Chapter BZ/California. Heart disease led to Beach's retirement in 1940, around the time of which she was honored at a testimonial dinner by 200 of her friends in New York. Beach died in New York City in 1944. Amy Beach is buried with her husband in the Forest Hills Cemetery in the Jamaica Plain neighborhood of Boston, Massachusetts.

== Compositions ==
Beach was a member of the "Second New England School" or "Boston Group"; the other members were composers John Knowles Paine, Arthur Foote, George Chadwick, Edward MacDowell, George Whiting, and Horatio Parker. Her writing is mainly in a Romantic idiom, often compared to that of Brahms or Rachmaninoff. In her later works she experimented, moving away from tonality, employing whole tone scales and more exotic harmonies and techniques.

Beach's compositions include a one-act opera, Cabildo, and a variety of other works.

=== Symphonic works ===
Beach wrote the Gaelic Symphony (1896) and the Piano Concerto in C♯ minor (1898–99). Another orchestral piece, Bal masque, has a solo piano version. Two further pieces, Eilende Wolken and Jephthah's Daughter, are for orchestra with voice.

=== Choral works ===
Beach's sacred choral works are mainly for four voices and organ, but a few are for voices and orchestra, two being the Mass in E♭ major (1892) and her setting of St. Francis's Canticle of the Sun (1924, 1928), first performed at St. Bartholomew's in New York. A setting of the Te Deum with organ was first performed by the choir of men and boys at Emmanuel Episcopal Church in Boston. The Capitol Hill Choral Society of Washington, D.C., recorded the Canticle of the Sun, seven Communion Responses, and other pieces by Beach in 1998, led by its Musical Director Betty Buchanan, who founded the society in 1983.

There are some tens of secular choral works, accompanied by orchestra, piano, or organ. Publisher Arthur P. Schmidt once complained to Beach that her "choral pieces had practically no sale".

=== Chamber music ===
Beach's chamber music compositions include a violin sonata (recorded on seven different labels), a romance and three further pieces for violin and piano, a piano trio, a string quartet, and a piano quintet.

Of the over 300 works by Amy Beach which were published during her lifetime and included almost every genre, the largest category is her art songs and vocal chamber music. Beyond these, she wrote many chamber works and transcriptions for piano, including Variations on Balkan Themes, Beach's "longest and most important solo" piano work, which was composed in 1904, in response to revolts in the Balkans against the then ruling Ottoman Empire. Twelve are instrumental chamber works. One notable aspect of Beach's musicianship was her role as a virtuoso pianist, in which she regularly performed both her own compositions and those of others. She toured extensively in Germany, New England, and all the way to the Pacific Coast, where she brought European-American concert music to the western states. Among two of Beach's most frequently performed instrumental works are the Sonata in A Minor for Piano and Violin, Op. 34 and the Quintet in F♯ minor, Op. 67, as both were programmed extensively in the United States and Germany. Another noteworthy work which illustrates Beach's skill and adherence to tradition as a composer is her String Quartet, Op. 89.

==== Sonata in A minor for piano and violin, Op. 34 ====
In January 1897 Beach played with Franz Kneisel the premiere of her Sonata for Piano and Violin, Op. 34, which she had composed in the spring of 1896. Franz Kneisel was a leading violinist in Boston and beyond, having been hired at about age 20 by Wilhelm Gericke, conductor of the Boston Symphony Orchestra, as concertmaster of the orchestra. Soon after arriving in Boston, he formed the Kneisel String Quartet with three other string players of the Boston Symphony. (The Quartet lasted until 1917. Meanwhile, Kneisel moved to New York in 1905.) In 1894 Beach had joined the quartet in performing Robert Schumann's Piano Quintet in E♭, Op. 44. The Sonata is written in four movements, which are interconnected musically by using the first movement's opening theme as a germinating source to be developed on in the following three. They are thoroughly crafted to follow conventions of the form while implementing each musical element in a precise and well-constructed way.

The premiere was quickly followed by several other recital performances of the piece in various New York cities, where critical reception was mixed; some reviewers described the piece as immature and lacking in substance, although they acknowledged her skillful use of contrapuntal movement and affective principal themes. The third movement, Largo con dolore, was the most controversial among critics, with some praising its beauty and passionately evocative nature, while others derided its length as being too far extended and monotonous. Audiences, however, were captivated and spellbound by the slow movement; at one performance it was reported that they broke out into enthusiastic applause in between the third and fourth movements out of an abundance of emotion. In Europe, the piece was generally well received. The composer and pianist Teresa Carreño performed the piece with violinist Carl Halir in Berlin, October 1899 and wrote to Beach:

I assure you that I never had a greater pleasure in my life than the one I had in working out your beautiful sonata and having the good luck to bring it before the German public...(I)t really met with a decided success and this is said to the credit of the public.

Reviewers in Berlin were fairly positive in their response to the Sonata, hailing its technical development and brilliant use of the violin and piano as individual parts. Where criticized, they noted that it was perhaps too virtuosic for chamber music, while another reviewer for the Berliner Volks-Zeitung characterized Beach's compositional style as being too derivative of Schumann and Brahms—yet allowed Beach's gender as a caveat for this supposed shortcoming (sexism was common and extreme in classical music). He wrote:

In style, she is not individual; her dependence upon Schumann and Brahms is unmistakable, which is a weakness, for which the feminine character furnishes ground and excuse. The sonata is sonorous and graceful in both violin and piano parts, though the latter in the last movement somewhat oversteps the allotted bounds of chamber music.

==== Quintet in F♯ minor for Piano and Strings, Op. 67 ====
In 1900, with the Kneisel Quartet, Beach performed the Brahms Piano Quintet in F minor, Op. 34. Beach wrote her own three-movement Quintet for Piano and Strings in F♯ minor, Op. 67, in 1905. The quintet came to be frequently performed during Beach's lifetime, both in concert and over the radio. These performances were often given by established string quartets accompanied by the pianist-composer, including many times during an extended tour with the Kneisel Quartet in 1916–17, which was the 33rd and last season for the quartet. Beach performed her quintet with them in Boston, Brooklyn, Chicago, and Philadelphia.

Among all of Beach's chamber works, this work has been described as one of the most distinctly representative of a Brahmsian influence in her music, from the jagged chromatic melody and contrasting lyrical passages, irregularly phrase lengths, its key changes and lush texture, to its strict adherence to the sonata-allegro form. The primary theme throughout all three works, in fact, is borrowed from the last movement of the Brahms quintet, albeit adapted and reworked in a variety of ways. All three movements feature frequent distinct developments in meter, tempo, and key signature. The entire work carries an affective character of lamentation throughout, demonstrated not only by the overall emotive qualities of the work itself but also its use of the Phrygian tetrachord cadence frequently associated with mourning, which in this work outlines the notes F#-E-D-C#.

Generally speaking, the work was received quite well by audiences and reviewers as belonging to an important compositional tradition. Critics noted its aesthetically flexible imagination while adhering to traditional expectations, bringing a variety of expressive moods and tone colors to a work of substantial form. They also commented on the modernity and skill the work displayed in that it achieved a highly expressive nature and orchestral texture while maintaining the intimate, technically developed character of the chamber ensemble voicing. This work added to her reputation as a composer of serious high art music, although still deemed slightly beneath the works of similar male composers by some reviewers.

==== String Quartet, Op. 89 ====
Beach's String Quartet is a single movement and is one of her more mature works. It was originally labeled as Op. 79, but over the course of a decade, the work evolved, and Beach finally re-designated the piece as Op. 89 in 1929. The significance Beach bestowed on this piece is notable, given that it did not feature a piano part which she would perform, as did many of her other works. Because of the timing of the piece's composition, there is some evidence that Beach may have been inspired to write the work as part of Elizabeth Sprague Coolidge's chamber music competition in 1922. Numerous painstaking attempts demonstrate both Beach's devotion to the composition of this piece and her unfamiliarity with writing in this genre. The final work, completed in Rome, consists of a single movement divided into three sections, and thematically speaking, follows an arch form (A B C B1 A1). The piece uses three different Eskimo or Inuit melodies throughout the work: "Summer Song", "Playing at Ball", and "Itataujang's Song", taken from Franz Boas' book on the Alaskan Inuit tribes. Beach integrates these borrowed tunes within a framework of Austro-Germanic extended quasi-tonality and dissonance, first through more straightforward statements of the melodies and then as assimilated into a horizontal harmonic structure. Elements of the melodies are abstracted and developed into contrapuntal lines which propel the work forward in the absence of clear tonal direction. The texture and harmony is fairly stark in places, lacking the lush Romanticism of her earlier works and representing more Modernist inclinations of a developing composer.

The piece was premiered at the American Academy in April 1929, but Beach reported little on whether or not this performance was satisfactory. Nonetheless, it was followed by a number of private performances and small recitals in New York, Cincinnati, and Massachusetts. A 1937 performance arranged by Roy Harris was particularly disappointing, as the performers were ill-prepared and sight-read the work poorly. No performance of the quartet was fully satisfactory to Beach, and the work did not gain the recognition that she seemed to hope it would gather.

Because the quartet was so different from many of Beach's previous works, and given that Beach was unable to perform it herself, there is little known concerning both audience and critic response to the piece. Composer and biographer Burnet Corwin Tuthill offered praise of it, saying that while it was unusual for Beach and lacked the emotionalism usually prevalent in her music, it demonstrated remarkable technical sophistication and skill in its handling of both string writing and engagement with thematic material that was not European in origin. In fact, Beach's use of Inuit and Native American tunes became a marked feature in several of her other works, which she used as a means of bringing stylistic modernity to her sound through the appropriation and recontextualization of these melodies.

=== Solo piano music ===
- Valse Caprice, Op. 4 (1889)
- Ballade, Op. 6 (1894)
- Sketches, Op. 15 (1892)
- Bal Masque, Op. 22 (1894)
- Children's Carnival Op. 25 (1894)
- Three Pieces, Op. 28 (1894)
- Children's Album, Op. 36 (1897)
- Scottish Legend and Gavotte Fantastique, Op. 54 (1903)
- Variations on Balkan Themes, Op. 60 (1904)
- Four Eskimo Pieces, Op. 64 (1907)
- Suite Francaise, Op. 65 (1905)
- Prelude and Fugue, Op. 81 (1914)
- From Blackbird Hills, Op. 83 (1922)
- Fantasia Fugata, Op. 87 (1917)
- Far Hills of Eire, O, Op. 91 (1923)
- Hermit Thrush at Eve, at Morn, Op. 92 (1922)
- From Grandmother's Garden, Op. 97 (1922)
- Farewell Summer, Dancing Leaves, Op. 102 (1924)
- Old Chapel by Moonlight, Op. 106 (1924)
- Nocturne, Op. 107 (1924)
- A Cradle Song of the Lonely Mother, Op. 108 (1914)
- Tyrolean Valse Fantaisie, Op. 116 (1924)
- From Six to Twelve, Op. 119 (1932)
- Three Pieces, Op. 128 (1932)
- Out of the Depths, Op. 130 (1932)
- Five Improvisations, Op. 148 (1924–26)
- A Bit of Cairo (c. 1928)

=== Songs ===
Beach was most popular for her about 150 songs. She set about five each of her own texts and texts by H. H. A. Beach, and the rest are by other poets. "The Year's At the Spring" from Three Browning Songs, Op. 44 is perhaps Beach's best-known work. Despite the volume and popularity of the songs during her lifetime, no single-composer collection of Beach's songs exists. Some may be purchased through Hildegard Publishing Company and Masters Music Publication, Inc.

In the early 1890s, Beach started to become interested in folk songs. She shared that interest with several of her colleagues, and this interest soon came to be the first nationalist movement in American music. Beach's contributions included about thirty songs inspired by folk music, including Scottish, Irish, Balkan, African-American, and Native American origins.

== Writings ==
Beach was a musical intellectual who wrote for journals, newspapers, and other publications. She gave advice to young musicians and composers – especially female composers. From career to piano technique advice, Beach readily provided her opinions in articles such as "To the Girl who Wants to Compose" and "Emotion Versus Intellect in Music." In 1915, she had written Music's Ten Commandments as Given for Young Composers, which expressed many of her self-teaching principles.

== Late 20th century and early 21st century revival and reception ==
Despite her fame and recognition during her lifetime, Beach was largely neglected after her death in 1944 until the late 20th century. Efforts to revive interest in Beach's works have been largely successful during the last few decades.

=== Gaelic Symphony ===
The symphony has received praise from modern critics, such as Andrew Achenbach of Gramophone, who in 2003 lauded the work for its "big heart, irresistible charm and confident progress." In 2016, Jonathan Blumhofer of The Arts Fuse wrote:

To my ears, it is by far the finest symphony by an American composer before Ives and, by a wide margin, better than a lot that came after him. It surely is the most exciting symphony penned by an American before World War I. [...] Her command of instrumentation throughout the Symphony was consistently excellent and colorful. The manner in which she balanced content and form succeeds where her contemporaries like George Whitefield Chadwick, John Knowles Paine, and Horatio Parker so often came up short: somehow Beach's Symphony is never daunted by the long shadows Brahms and Beethoven cast across the Atlantic. It's a fresh, invigorating, and personal statement in a genre that has offered plenty of examples of pieces that demonstrate none of those qualities.

=== Piano Concerto ===
Beach's Piano Concerto has been praised as an overlooked masterwork by modern critics. In 1994, Phil Greenfield of The Baltimore Sun called it "a colorful, dashing work that might become extremely popular if enough people get a chance to hear it. In 2000 Joshua Kosman of the San Francisco Chronicle also lauded the composition, writing:

Its four movements are packed with incident – beautifully shaped melodies (several of them drawn from her songs), a forthright rhythmic profile and a vivacious and sometimes contentious interplay between soloist and orchestra. The piano part is as flashy and demanding as a virtuoso vehicle calls for, but there is also an element of poignancy about it – a sense of constraint that seems to shadow even the work's most extroverted passages.

Andrew Achenbach of Gramophone similarly declared it "ambitious" and "singularly impressive... a rewarding achievement all round, full of brilliantly idiomatic solo writing ... lent further autobiographical intrigue by its assimilation of thematic material from three early songs".

=== Tributes and memorials ===
In 1994, the Boston Women's Heritage Trail placed a bronze plaque at her Boston address, and in 1995, Beach's gravesite at Forest Hills Cemetery was dedicated. In 1999, she was put into the American Classical Music Hall of Fame and Museum in Cincinnati, Ohio. In 2000, the Boston Pops paid tribute by adding her name as the first woman joining 87 other composers on the granite wall of Boston's Hatch Shell. In honor of Beach's 150th birthday Marty Walsh, Mayor of the City of Boston, declared September 5, 2017, to be "Amy Beach Day." Also commemorating Beach's sesquicentennial, The New York Times published an article by William Robin, "Amy Beach, a Pioneering American Composer, Turns 150".

== Discography ==
=== Solo piano music ===
- Piano Music, Vol. 1, The Early Works, Kirsten Johnson, piano, Guild GMCD 7317
- Piano Music, Vol. 2, The Turn of the Century, Kirsten Johnson, piano, Guild GMCD 7329
- Piano Music, Vol. 3, The Mature Years, Kirsten Johnson, piano, Guild GMCD 7351
- Piano Music, Vol. 4, The Late Works, Kirsten Johnson, piano, Guild GMCD 7387
- By the Still Waters, Joanne Polk, piano, Allmusic Z6693
- Under the Stars, Joanne Polk, piano, Arabesque, B000005ZYW
- Fire Flies, Joanne Polk, piano, Arabesque, Z6721 (1998).
- Une prodige empêchée, Jennifer Fichet, piano, Hortus 237 (2024)

=== Other chamber music ===
Amy Beach, Sonata for violin and piano in A minor, Op. 34:

- Recorded on the following labels: Albany No. 150, Arabesque No. 6747, Centaur Nos. 2312, 2767, Chandos No. 10162, Koch Nos. 7223, 7281, NWW No. 80542, Summit No. 270, White Pine no. 202. More details on Chandos 10162:
- Amy Beach, Sonata for Violin and Piano in A minor; Quartet for Strings; Pastorale for Wind Quintet; and Sketches (4) for Piano, Dreaming. Performed by the Ambache Chamber Ensemble. Chandos Records 10162
- Centaur 2312 also has the Barcarolle for violin and piano, the three pieces for violin and piano Op. 40, the Romance Op. 23, and the Invocation Op. 55, all performed by Laura Klugholz, violin/viola, and Jill Timmons, piano
- Mrs. H.H.A. (Amy) Beach (1867–1944), music for two pianos. Virginia Eskin and Kathleen Supové, pianists. Koch 3–7345–2
- Amy Beach, Piano Quintet in F♯ minor, Op. 67. Old Stoughton String Quartet. AMRC 0040. Ambache Ensemble Chandos Records 9752
- Amy Beach, Songs. Sung by mezzo-soprano Katherine Kelton and accompanied by pianist Catherine Bringerud. Naxos 8559191
- Chamber Music CDs: 2 Ambache Ensemble recordings on Chandos Records (9752 & 10162), both awarded rosettes in the Penguin Guide: 1) Piano Quintet, Op 67; Theme & Variations, Op 80; Piano Trio, Op 50. 2) String Quartet. Op 89; Violin Sonata, Op 34; Pastorale, Op 151; Dreaming, Op 50 No 3.
- Amy Beach, 4 Sketches, Op. 15: No. 3. Dreaming, Romance, Op. 23, Violin Sonata in A Minor, Op. 34, Invocation, Op. 55, Lento espressivo, Op. 125. Matteo Amadasi, viola and Katia Spluga, piano. Stradivarius STR37259

=== Orchestral music, possibly with chorus ===
- Amy Beach, Canticle of the Sun, Op. 123; Invocation for the Violin, Op. 55; With Prayer and Supplication, Op. 8; Te Deum, from Service in A, Op. 63; Constant Christmas, Op. 95; On a Hill; Kyrie eleison, Op. 122; Sanctus, Op. 122; Agnus Dei, Op. 122; Spirit of Mercy, Op. 125; Evening Hymn, Op. 125; I Will Give Thanks, Op. 147; Peace I leave With You, Op. 8. Performed by Capitol Hill Choral Society, Betty Buchanan, music director, Albany Records, 1998, TROY295
- Amy Beach, Grand Mass in E-flat major. Performed by the Stow Festival Chorus and Orchestra. Albany Records, 1995. TROY179
- Amy Beach, Grand Mass in E-flat major, Performed by the Michael May Festival Chorus. Compact disc. Newport Classic, 1989, 60008
- Amy Beach, Piano Concerto in C sharp minor with pianist Alan Feinberg and the Symphony in E minor ("Gaelic"). Performed by the Nashville Symphony Orchestra conducted by Kenneth Schermerhorn. Naxos 8559139. Note: one review of this mentions "Symphony No. 2" but Beach only wrote one symphony, the Gaelic.
- Amy Beach, Piano Concerto in C sharp minor with pianist Mary Louise Boehm (the first performer to revive this work, in 1976). Performed by the Westphalian Symphony Orchestra conducted by Siegfried Landau. Turnabout QTV, 1976, 34665; reissued on Vox Turnabout CD 7196

== Sources ==
- Fried Block, Adrienne (1998), Amy Beach, Passionate Victorian, Oxford University Press, New York, ISBN 0195074084
- Fried Block, Adrienne (2001). "Beach [née Cheney], Amy Marcy [Mrs H.H.A. Beach]". The New Grove Dictionary of Music and Musicians, second edition, edited by Stanley Sadie and John Tyrrell. London: Macmillan Publishers.
- Gates, Eugene (2010). "Mrs. H.H.A. Beach: American Symphonist" (PDF). The Kapralova Society Journal. 8 (2): 1–10.
