= John Henry Willcox =

John Henry Willcox (1827 in Savannah, Georgia – 1875 in Boston, Massachusetts) was an organist and organ maker educated at Trinity College (Connecticut). He spent the rest of his life as an organist in Boston. While there, he was a partner in the organ building firm run by William Benjamin Dearborn Simmons. He was succeeded as organist and choir master at the Church of the Immaculate Conception by George Whiting.
