= Gaelic Symphony =

Symphony composed by Amy Beach

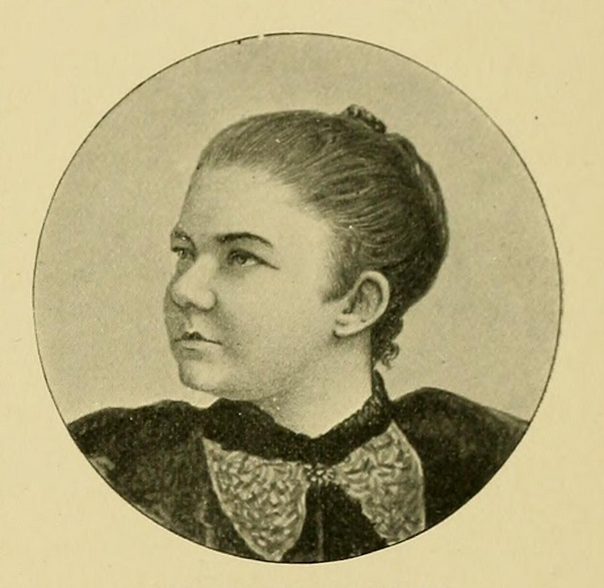
Portrait of Amy Beach from an 1897 publication

The Gaelic Symphony or Symphony in E minor, Op. 32 was written by Amy Marcy Cheney Beach in 1894; it was the first symphony composed and published by a female American composer. The piece debuted in Boston on Friday, October 30, 1896 to "public and journalistic acclaim." Beach drew inspiration for the large orchestral work from Irish melodies; thus, she subtitled the work 'Gaelic.'

== History ==
Beach began composing her symphony in November 1894. She chose to incorporate three Irish tunes in her Symphony; she also incorporated her own song "Dark is the Night" (1890, op. 11/1) into the first movement.

Beach was influenced by her contemporary Antonín Dvořák; like many, she looked to Dvořák's compositions and publicized philosophies on American music while composing her symphony. Though Dvořák's nationality was Czech, he was in the United States for much of 1892–1895 as head of the National Conservatory in New York. He represented American art music in the late nineteenth century—specifically through his New World Symphony and American String Quartet. Dvořák wove pentatonic scales from Native-American and African-American music and rhythms of slavic dances along with his European romantic style to create works unique to America—the melting pot. The "native" elements were not as readily embraced by Beach. Upon hearing of the derivations of Dvořák's New World Symphony, Beach heartily responded, "[w]e of the North should be far more likely to be influenced by old English, Scotch or Irish songs, inherited with our literature from our ancestors." When her symphony premiered, Beach was barely 30 years old and in the throes of forming her own compositional style; in contrast, her later years brought maturity and an openness to infuse Native-American, specifically Inuit, and African-American songs into her music.

The work was published by Schmidt in 1897, and was dedicated to "herrn Capellmeister Emil Paur". In 2017, honoring Beach's 150th birth-year, a new critical edition was prepared by Women's Philharmonic Advocacy and described and distributed through their Amy Beach website

== Structure ==
The piece is typically performed in 35 to 40 minutes. With a full romantic harmonic structure and a glimpse of the horizons of modern music, Beach's Gaelic Symphony set her apart as a prominent female composer at the turn of the twentieth century. The symphony is in four movements.

=== I. Allegro con fuoco ===
The symphony begins with a low chromatic rumble in the strings which provides the basis on which the romantic melody is built. Rich orchestration establishes the romantic style of the symphony. Its unusual key choices mirror those in the first movement of Dvořák's New World Symphony.

=== II. Alla siciliana – allegro vivace ===
The Gaelic themes are introduced in variation. One of the Irish folk songs used is "The Lily of the West", which is, incidentally, sung by Mark Knopfler with the Chieftains on their album called "The Long Black Veil".

=== III. Lento con molto espressione ===
The third movement is melodic and slow in nature.

=== IV. Allegro di molto ===
The last movement of the symphony is brisk and thematic.

== Instrumentation ==
- Piccolo (only in mvmt. 2)
- 2 Flutes
- 2 Oboes
- Cor Anglais (only in mvmt. 2)
- 2 Clarinets in Bb & A
- Bass Clarinet in Bb (only in mvmt. 3)
- 2 Bassoons
- 4 Horns in F
- 2 Trumpets in C
- 2 Trombones
- Bass Trombone
- Tuba
- Timpani
- Percussion: Triangle (only in mvmt. 2)
- Strings (Violin 1, Violin 2, Viola, Cello, Bass)

== Reception and performances ==
The Gaelic Symphony was well received. Critic Philip Hale "was generally enthusiastic about the work" although he "felt that Beach's orchestration was at times excessively heavy." Composer George Whitefield Chadwick' wrote a letter to Beach: saying that he and Horatio Parker, a fellow member of the unofficial Second New England School of leading composers, had heard and liked the Gaelic Symphony, and: "...I always feel a thrill of pride myself whenever I hear a fine work by any of us, and as such you will have to be counted in, whether you will or not—one of the boys." Not long afterward Beach herself became recognized as one of the School, thereupon called the Boston Six.

The Symphony was "forgotten during the 1920s" but "made a comeback in the 1930s and 1940s," being performed by multiple orchestras, some multiple times each, although not by "major" US orchestras such as the New York Philharmonic or Boston Symphony, with the highest ranking US orchestra to record the work being the Detroit Symphony Orchestra, as led by Neeme Järvi (Chandos, 1991). However, the Royal Philharmonic Orchestra (UK) did record it in 1968.

The symphony has received continued praise from modern critics as well, such as Andrew Achenbach of Gramophone, who in 2003 lauded the work for its "big heart, irresistible charm and confident progress."

== Sources ==
- Block, Adrienne Fried (1998). Amy Beach, Passionate Victorian: The Life and Work of an American Composer, Oxford University Press, New York
- Gates, Eugene, 2010, "Mrs. H.H.A. Beach, American Symphonist," The Kapralova Society Journal Vol. 8 No. 2, pp. 1–10
