= Joanne Polk =

American pianist

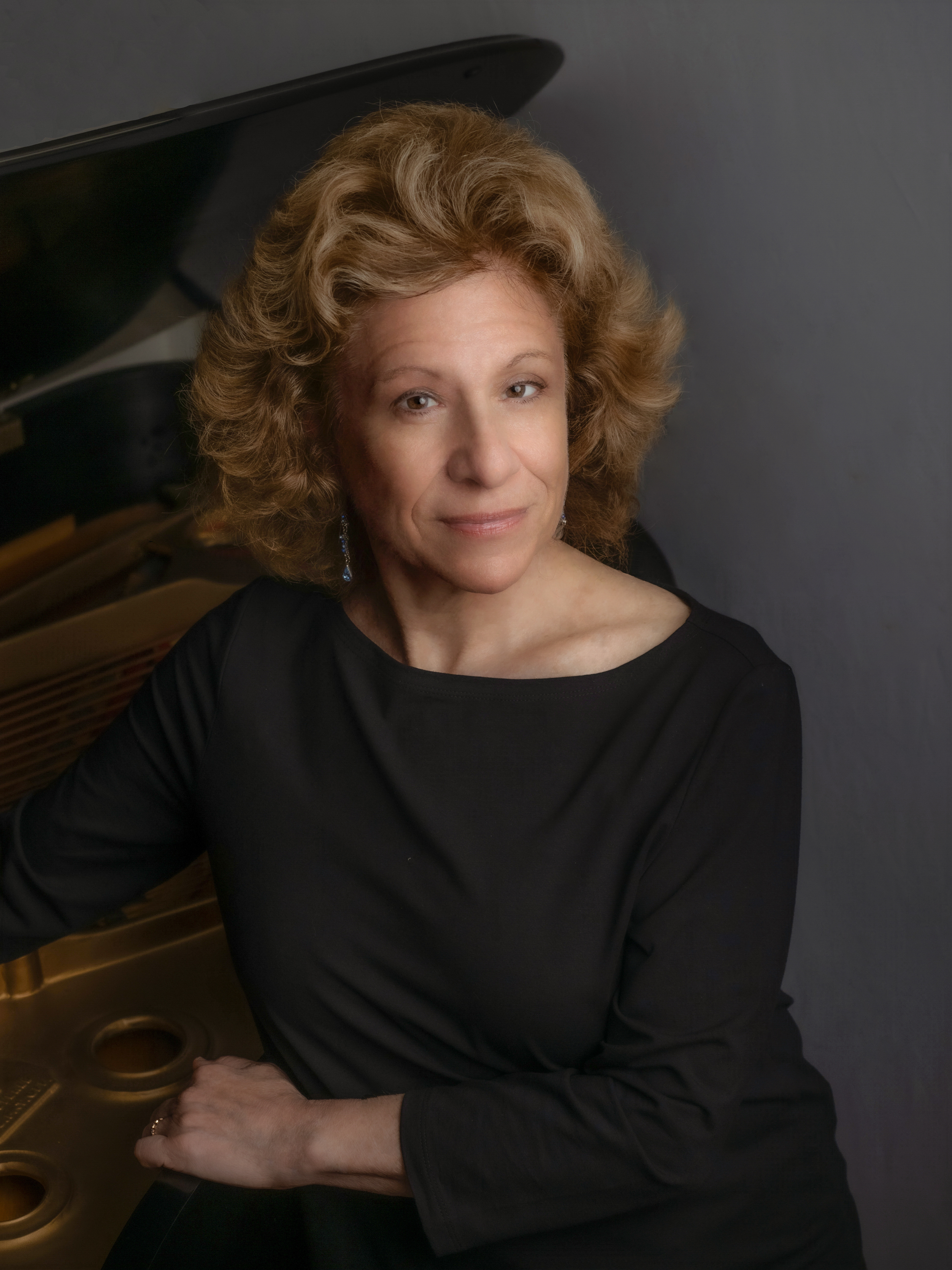
- Polk in 2023

Background information
- Genres: Classical
- Occupations: Musician; educator
- Instrument: Piano
- Years active: 1990s–present
- Labels: Arabesque; Steinway & Sons
- Website: joannepolkpianist.com

Joanne Polk is an American classical pianist. She holds Bachelor of Music and Master of Music degrees from The Juilliard School and a Doctor of Musical Arts degree from the Manhattan School of Music. She hosts master classes at many universities and festivals across the country and in Asia.

== Career ==
Pianist Joanne Polk was introduced to the public when she appeared on the Arabesque Recordings label with her recordings of the complete piano works of American composer Amy Beach (1867–1944). Polk celebrated the centennial of the premiere of Beach's piano concerto performing the piece under the conductorship of Paul Goodwin with the English Chamber Orchestra at the Barbican Centre in London. The first solo recording for the Beach series in 1998 won the INDIE Award for Best Solo Recording.

One year earlier, she recorded the CD Completely Clara: Lieder by Clara Wieck Schumann for Arabesque Recordings together with soprano Korliss Uecker. This CD was chosen as "Best of the Year" by The Seattle Times. Polk, together with baritone Patrick Mason, recorded the CD Songs of Amy Beach for Bridge Records, which was nominated for a Grammy Award in 2007. Polk has released a two-CD set of the music of Fanny Mendelssohn as well. These CDs, titled Songs for Pianoforte, with solo piano music by Mendelssohn, were recorded for the Newport Classic label. Polk also recorded a CD titled Fanny and Felix Mendelssohn which featured solo piano music of Fanny and her brother Felix, and was released on Bridge Records.

In 2014, Polk recorded a CD titled The Flatterer for the Steinway & Sons label, which included solo piano music by French romantic composer Cécile Chaminade. The CD debuted at number 1 on the Classical Billboard chart and was a "Pick of the Week" on New York's classical radio station WQXR-FM. That same year, she was named one of Musical America's Top 30 Professionals of the Year. In 2017, she released a CD titled Gershwin & Wild on Steinway & Sons. The CD contains Earl Wild's transcriptions of George Gershwin popular songs, as well as Wild's own piano sonata, Sonata 2000. In 2018, Polk embarked on a three-week tour of concerts and masterclass in five cities in China and Taiwan.

In February 2020, she released a CD titled Louise Farrenc Etudes and Variations for Piano Solo on the Steinway & Sons label. The same year, in December, this CD was featured on The New York Times's "Best Classical Music of 2020" list. Polk's recording The Silence Between the Notes: Louise Farrenc Solo Piano Music Volume 2 was released on September 1, 2023, also on Steinway & Sons. On September 6, 2024, her most recent recording, Nostalgia: Piano Music of Cécile Chaminade Volume 2, was released on the same label.

Polk returned to China in 2024 for a three-week, 8-city tour. In the Summer of 2024, she performed recitals and masterclasses in Guadalajara, Mexico. She is a piano faculty member of the Manhattan School of Music and is an exclusive Steinway artist.

== Discography ==
- Completely Clara: Lieder by Clara Wieck Schumann (1993) with soprano Korliss Uecker
- Zones: Chamber Music by Judith lang Zaimont (1997)
- Amy Beach: By the Still Waters (1998)
- Amy Beach: Under the Stars (1998)
- Amy Beach: Fire-Flies (1998)
- Amy Beach: Empress of Night (2000)
- Amy Beach: Morning Glories: Joanne Polk with the Lark Quartet (2000)
- Callisto (2003): music for piano by Judith Lang Zaimont
- Songs of Amy Beach (2005)
- The Piano Sings: Piano Music of Fanny Mendelssohn (2010)
- Fanny and Felix Mendelssohn (2012)
- The Flatterer (2014)
- Gershwin & Wild (Steinway & Sons, 2017)
- Louise Farrenc: Etudes & Variations for Solo Piano (2020)
- Social Flutterby: Piano Music of David Shenton (2021)
- The Silence Between the Notes: Louise Farrenc Solo Piano Music Volume 2 (2023)
- Nostalgia: Piano Music of Cécile Chaminade Volume 2 (2024)
