= Florence P. Rea =

American composer (1878-1924)

Florence Pauline Rea (5 June 1878 - 25 December 1924) was an American composer of many pedagogical works for piano and organ.

Rea was born in Oakland, California, to Catherine Ford Rea and John Rea. Little is known about her education. She died in Evanston, Illinois.

Rea’s compositions were published by Arthur P. Schmidt, Arthur Music, and Clayton F. Summy Co. Her works for piano and organ include:

- At the Organ
- Clover Blossoms
- Descriptive Pedal Studies
- Fairy Frolics (a collection)
- Fall and Winter Holidays
- Four Teaching Pieces
- Hello Mr. Robin!
- King Thrush
- Linnet
- Spring and Summer Holidays
- The Wood Nymph’s Harp (with Margaret Gardner)
