= Arthur P. Schmidt (music publisher) =

American music publisher

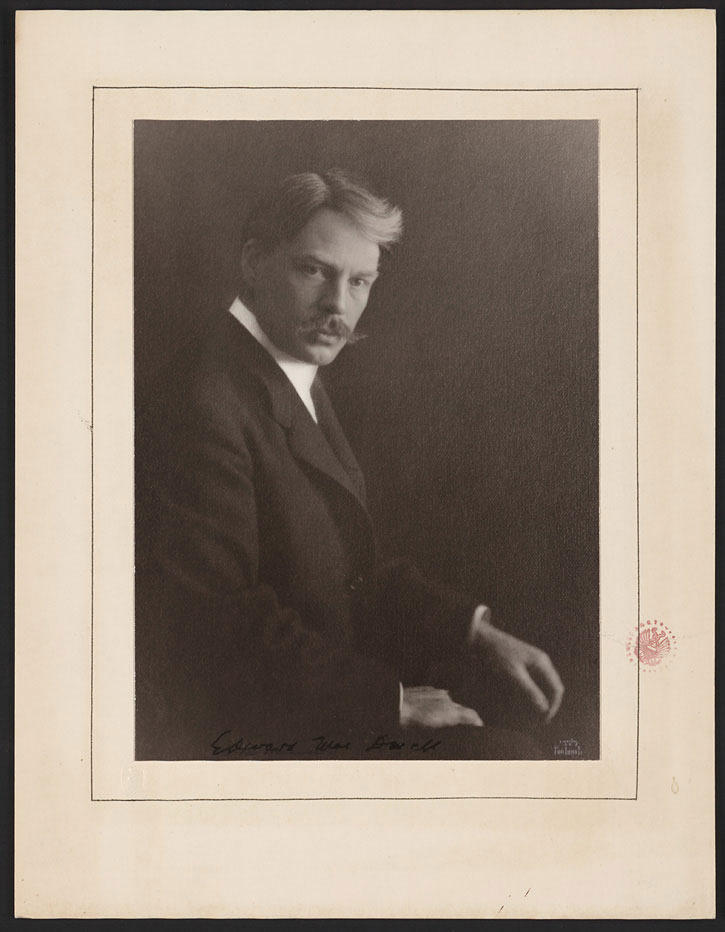
- Gelatin silver print photograph of American composer Edward MacDowell from the A.P. Schmidt Company Archives at the Library of Congress
- Born: Arthur Paul Schmidt; April 1, 1846
- Died: May 5, 1921 (aged 75)
- Occupation: Music publisher

Arthur Paul Schmidt (April 1, 1846 – May 5, 1921) was a music publisher in the United States. The Library of Congress has a collection of his company's archives.

He was born in Altona, then part of the Duchy of Holstein and under Danish control. He arrived in the United States in 1866 and worked for the G. D. Russell publishing house in Boston before opening his own retail and foreign music importing business in 1876, A.P. Schmidt Company. It had offices in New York City and Leipzig, Germany and was successful publishing works by American composers. Schmidt published work by George Whitefield Chadwick (Symphony no.2, op.21, the first orchestral score that was both written by an American composer and issued an American publisher), Amy Beach, Arthur Bird, Arthur Foote, Henry Kimball Hadley, Edward McDowell Horatio Parker, Alice Locke Pittman, Olga Radecki, Florence P. Rea, Emily Bruce Roelofson, Harriet P. Sawyer, and Anice Terhune.

After his death, the firm was acquired by Summy-Birchard Company of Evanston, Illinois in 1960.
