= Gershwin & Wild =

Studio album by Joanne Polk
- Released: September 15, 2017
- Recorded: November 21–23, 2016
- Venues: Recital Hall of the Performing Arts Center, Purchase College, State University of New York
- Genre: Classical
- Length: 59:56
- Labels: Steinway & Sons; STNS 30090 CD
- Producer: Steven Epstein

Joanne Polk chronology
| The Flatterer (2014) | Gershwin & Wild (2017) | Louise Farrenc: Etudes & Variations for Solo Piano (2020) |

Gershwin & Wild is a studio album by American pianist Joanne Polk, recorded on November 21 23, 2016, and released by the Steinway & Sons label on September 15, 2017. The album features eight Earl Wild transcriptions of popular music by George Gershwin as well as Wild's own piano sonata, Sonata 2000.

== Reception ==
Professional ratings
Review scores
| Source | Rating |
|---|---|
| AllMusic | 4/5 stars |
| Audiophile Audition | 4/5 stars |

James Manheim of AllMusic wrote, "A new recording of any works of the underappreciated [Earl] Wild is welcome, and from American pianist Joanne Polk you get much more than the minimum. ... there is an easy familiarity with the jazz idiom that Wild exploits ... [and] the presence of an original Wild work, the Sonata 2000, with a final toccata inspired by Ricky Martin. ... there are fireworks galore here ... [with] the consistently strong sound of the Steinway & Sons label".

The American Record Guide called Polk's playing on this album "plush and dreamily attractive".

Audiophile Audition stated, "Rapid scales, octave passages and virtuoso pianistic feats never obscure Gershwin's glorious tunes, creating a feast for the ears for 21st century classical music lovers ... In these works, Ms. Polk's warm tone in the softer passages matches the luminous sound that producer and engineer Steven Epstein provides. Yet, she provides enough passion to capture the jazzy essence and virtuosity required in Wild's transcriptions."

Rick Anderson's review for CD HotList commented, "this is highly complex classical music that draws on influences from popular culture but in no way bows to them. Joanne Polk is a thrilling exponent of these works, and this disc would make a great addition to any library supporting piano pedagogy."

== Track listing ==
All tracks are written by George Gershwin, with lyrics by Ira Gershwin, except where noted. All tracks are arranged by Earl Wild.

All tracks are written by George Gershwin, with lyrics by Ira Gershwin, except where noted. All tracks are arranged by Earl Wild.
No.
Title
Writer(s)
Length

7 Virtuoso Études After Gershwin
1.
I. "Liza"
- George Gershwin
- Ira Gershwin
- Gus Kahn
4:07
2.
II. "Somebody Loves Me"
- George Gershwin
- Ballard MacDonald
- Buddy DeSylva
3:28
3.
III. "The Man I Love"

2:58
4.
IV. "Embraceable You"

3:52
5.
V. "Oh, Lady Be Good!"

4:35
6.
VI. "I Got Rhythm"

2:40
7.
VII. "Fascinatin' Rhythm"

2:05
8.
"Theme & Variations on Gershwin's 'Someone To Watch Over Me'"
- George Gershwin
- Ira Gershwin
- Howard Dietz
15:15

Sonata 2000
9.
I. "March: Allegro"
Earl Wild
7:29
10.
II. "Adagio"
Wild
8:08
11.
III. "Toccata (à la Ricky Martin)"
Wild
5:19

Total length: 59:56

- Recorded November 21–23, 2016, at the Recital Hall of the Performing Arts Center, Purchase College, State University of New York

== Personnel ==
- Joanne Polk – piano; liner notes
- Earl Wild – arranger, composer
- Jon Feidner – executive producer
- Steven Epstein – producer, recording engineer
- Jeffrey Langford – liner notes, photography
- Jackie Fugere – art direction
- Al Hirschfeld – cover artwork (caricature)
- Rick Prokop – piano technician
