= Mass in E-flat (Beach) =

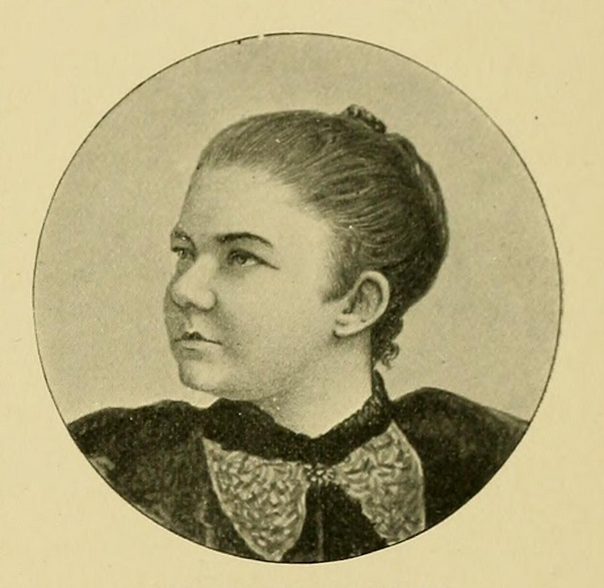
Portrait of Amy Beach from an 1897 publication

The Mass in E♭, Op. 5, also known as the Grand Mass in E-flat, is a choral work by American composer Amy Beach. It was the first mass written by an American woman and Beach's first widely acclaimed large-scale composition. The Mass is a 75-minute work for chorus, quartet, organ, and orchestra.

== Composition ==
Beach began work on her Mass in E♭ in 1886 after her marriage to surgeon Dr. Henry Harris Aubrey Beach and took three years to complete.

The Handel and Haydn Society premiered the Mass in Boston in 1892; the Mass was the Society's first performance of a work composed by a woman. The same group had performed Luigi Cherubini's Deuxième Messe Solenelle in D minor in 1883 and played selections from Bach's Mass in B minor in 1887. There are parallels in overall structure, and in some phrases, between Beach's Mass and Cherubini's. Beach's Mass was not performed again until the 1980s. It has been recorded (see Discography).

The Mass is in five sections: Kyrie, Gloria in 4 movements, Credo in one movement with four clear subdivisions, Sanctus, and Agnus Dei. Written in a Romantic style, the Mass is rich in harmony and tonality. It was praised for its contrast in instrumentation and the solos for harp, cello, English horn, and oboe.

Beach was apparently unfamiliar with how Latin is stressed, as accents in the music may not agree with those in expected in words such as 'altissimus'.

== Influences ==
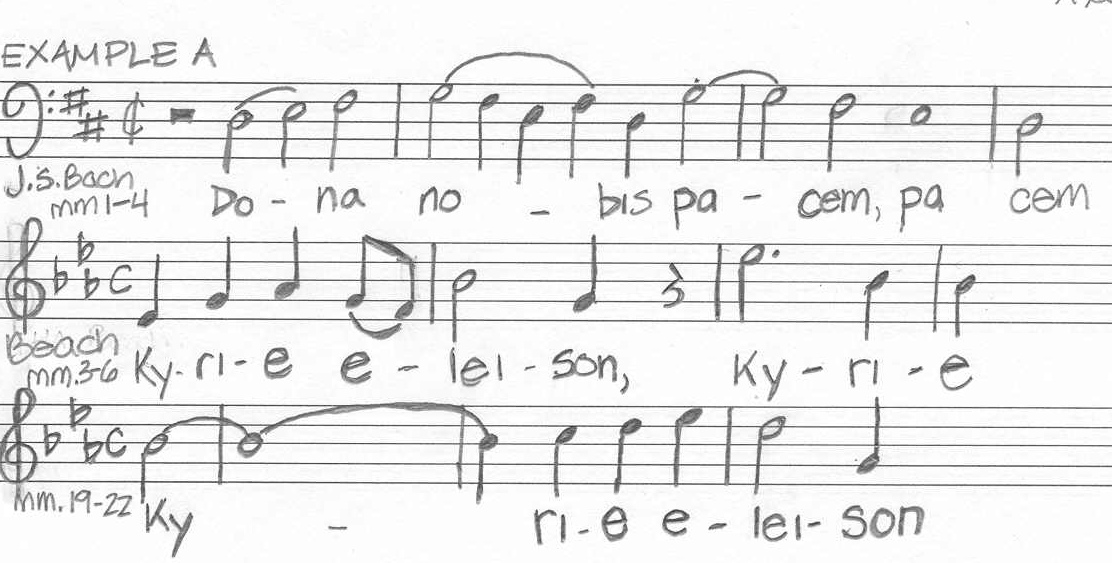
The Kyrie

In movements of the Gloria, most prominently in the "Quoniam," Beach uses double-dotted rhythms that also appear in Cherubini's Kyrie. These rhythms give a march-like quality to the movement. They are paired with trumpets and drums to evoke a sense of the Church Militant. Beach's frequently modulates to third-related keys, as in "Laudamus te", in which she uses the keys of E♭ major, G♭ major, E♭ minor, and C major. Beach frequently uses C major to indicate heaven or light; here, it refers to divinity.

== Reception ==
The premiere in 1892 was reviewed in 27 newspapers, 18 in Boston and 9 "out of town." One criticism was that the opening solo trio in the "Laudamus te" had "pitch and ensemble problems." These may have been due to insufficient instrumental support, or the fact that this was a first performance. In general, critics agreed that the work placed Beach "among the foremost rank of American composers."

Following the success of the Mass, Beach began to receive significant commissions for choral and vocal works. This included the Festival Jubilate, Op. 17 for Mixed Chorus and Orchestra for the 1893 World's Columbian Exposition in Chicago, the concert aria Eilende Wolken, Op. 18, premiered by the Symphony Society of New York (the first time the group performed a work written by a woman), and her Song of Welcome, Op. 42 for the 1898 Trans-Mississippi Exposition in Omaha, Nebraska.

One recording of Beach's Mass, by the Michael May Festival Chorus in 1989, was made without a full orchestra. The performance was criticized for inaccurate tempos, inappropriate rearrangements, and overall interpretation. No scholarly reviews have been made of the other recording, from 1995, by the Stow Festival Chorus and Orchestra.

== Discography ==
- Amy Beach: Grand Mass in E♭ major. Performed by the Michael May Festival Chorus. Compact disc, 1989, Newport Classic 60008
- Amy Beach: Grand Mass in E♭ major. Performed by the Stow Festival Chorus and Orchestra. Albany Records, 1995, TROY 179

== Sources ==
- Fried Block, Adrienne: Amy Beach, Passionate Victorian: The Life and Work of an American Composer, 1867-1944. New York: Oxford University Press, 1998.
- Fried Block, Adrienne: "St. Peter: an oratorio and Grand Mass in E♭ Major" (in Record Reviews) American Music, Vol. 10, No. 2 (Summer, 1992), pp. 229–232. (St. Peter: an Oratorio is a work by John Knowles Paine, 1839–1906)
