= Arthur Foote =

American composer (1853–1937)

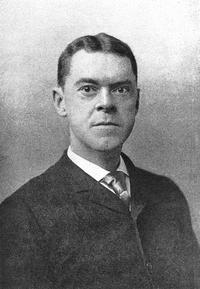
Arthur Foote as a young man

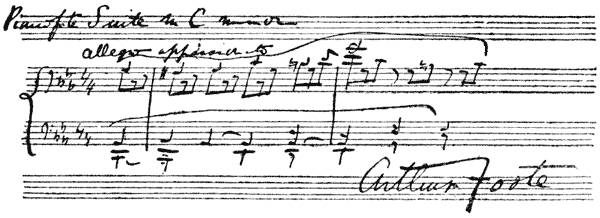
Autograph of Arthur Foote

Arthur William Foote (March 5, 1853 in Salem, Massachusetts – April 8, 1937 in Boston, Massachusetts) was an American classical composer, and a member of the "Boston Six". The other five were George Whitefield Chadwick, Amy Beach, Edward MacDowell, John Knowles Paine, and Horatio Parker. According to musicologist Nicholas Tawa, Foote was the first noted American classical composer to be trained entirely in the U.S.

== Early life and education ==
Arthur Foote was the son of Caleb and Mary Wilder (White) Foote. Caleb was editor and sole owner of the Salem Gazette. Mary died in 1857 and Foote was raised by his elder sister, the author Mary Wilder Tileston. His childhood home was 44 Warren Street (burned down in the Salem fire of 1914). He took local piano lessons from the age of twelve, and in 1867 began studying theory at the New England Conservatory with Stephen Albert Emery. In 1870 he enrolled at Harvard, where he studied composition with John Knowles Paine. Harvard granted Foote the first M.A. in music to be given by an American university, in 1875. Post-graduation he studied piano and organ with Benjamin Johnson Lang, who became a significant mentor.

== Career ==
Foote gave his first piano recital in 1876 (continuing to perform regularly until 1895), and gained his first organist appointment that year, at the Church of the Desciples. He was appointed organist of the First Church in Boston (Unitarian) in 1878, remaining there 32 years. A founder of the American Guild of Organists, he was one of the examiners at the first Guild Fellowship examination. He helped organize the New England chapter of the AGO, and from 1909 to 1912 (when the office was discontinued) he served as National Honorary President of the AGO, succeeding Horatio Parker in that position. He was one of the editors of Hymns of the Church Universal, a Unitarian hymnal published in 1890.

He was an early advocate of Brahms and Wagner and promoted performances of their music. Foote taught at the New England Conservatory from 1921-1937 and wrote a number of pedagogical works, including Modern Harmony in Its Theory and Practice (1905), written with Walter R. Spalding. It was republished as Harmony (1969). He also wrote Some Practical Things in Piano-Playing (1909) and Modulation and Related Harmonic Questions (1919). He contributed many articles to music journals, including "Then and Now, Thirty Years of Musical Advance in America" in Etude (1913) and "A Bostonian Remembers" in Musical Quarterly (1937). His students included Robert Nathaniel Dett Isabel Stewart North and Frances Marion Ralston.

As a Boston composer, Foote benefitted from the support of the Boston Symphony Orchestra, which premiered works such as the overture In the Mountains (1886), the symphonic prologue Francesca da Rimini (1892) and especially the Suite for Strings in E major of 1908, much admired by Koussevitzky). For chamber music he worked closely with the Kneisel Quartet between 1890 and 1910, with premieres of the String Quartet No. 2 in 1894 and the A minor Piano Quintet in 1898. His songs, including 'Go, Lovely Rose', 'I'm Wearing Awa' and 'An Irish Folk Song', were taken up by the famous tenor John McCormack. He was a friend of John Philip Sousa, who arranged two of the Omar Khayyam piano pieces for band. His publisher was Arthur P. Schmidt.

== Personal life and death ==
He married Kate Knowlton in 1880, and there was a daughter, Katherine, born in 1881. They lived at 2-3 West Cedar Street, Beacon Hill until 1895, and from 1898 until 1912 in Dedham, Massachusetts where Foote was a member of the Society in Dedham for Apprehending Horse Thieves. They moved to Brookline in 1912. In 1927 he wrote an autobiography at the request of his daughter, not intended for publication, though eventually published posthumously in 1946. He died on 8 April 1937, aged 84, at Massachusetts General Hospital, Boston, and was buried at Mount Auburn Cemetery. His wife Kate died in 1944. His daughter Katherine Foote Rafy died in 1970.

== Music ==
Foote composed more than 130 songs, as well as 50 part songs and 35 anthems. His large works for chorus and orchestra include The Farewell of Hiawatha (1885), The Wreck of the Hesperus (1888) and The Skeleton in Armor (1891), all settings of Longfellow. For orchestra alone there is a Cello Concerto (1887-93, revived for a new recording in 2026), and the symphonic Suite for Orchestra in D minor, Op. 36 (1895). For piano he wrote many short character pieces, such as the Five poems after Omar Khayyam, op. 41 (1898), which achieved later success once orchestrated.

His chamber music was (and is) highly regarded. The Chamber Music Journal (2002), discussing Foote's chamber music, has written, "If his name is not entirely unknown, it is fair to say that his music is. This is a shame. Foote's chamber music is first rate, deserving of regular public performance." His Piano Quartet, Op.23 (1890) and Piano Quintet, Op.38 (1897) are singled out for special praise. With regard to the Piano Quintet, the author writes, "Each of the movements is a gem. The Scherzo is particularly fine and the rousing finale beyond reproach. I believe that the only reason this work never received the audience it deserved and deserves is because it was written by an American who was 'out of the loop.'" As for the Piano Quartet, the opinion is that "it is as good as any late 19th century piano quartet." Landmark chamber works from his later career include the Second Piano Trio on Bb, Op. 65 (1908), the Third String Quartet, Op. 70 (1911), and the Cello Sonata, Op. 78 (1912-1918).

Frederick Jacobi, writing in 1937, called Foote "America's last Victorian....scarcely influenced by any music later than that of Mendelssohn". The modern tendency is to view Foote's music as "Romantic" and "European" in the light of the later generation of American composers such as Aaron Copland, Roy Harris and William Schuman, all of whom helped to develop a recognizably American sound in classical music. Wilma Reid Cipolla sums up his style as "firmly rooted in the romantic tradition [and] characterized by lyrical melodies, expressive phrasing, clear formal structure, colorful orchestration and impassioned feeling.

== Selected works ==
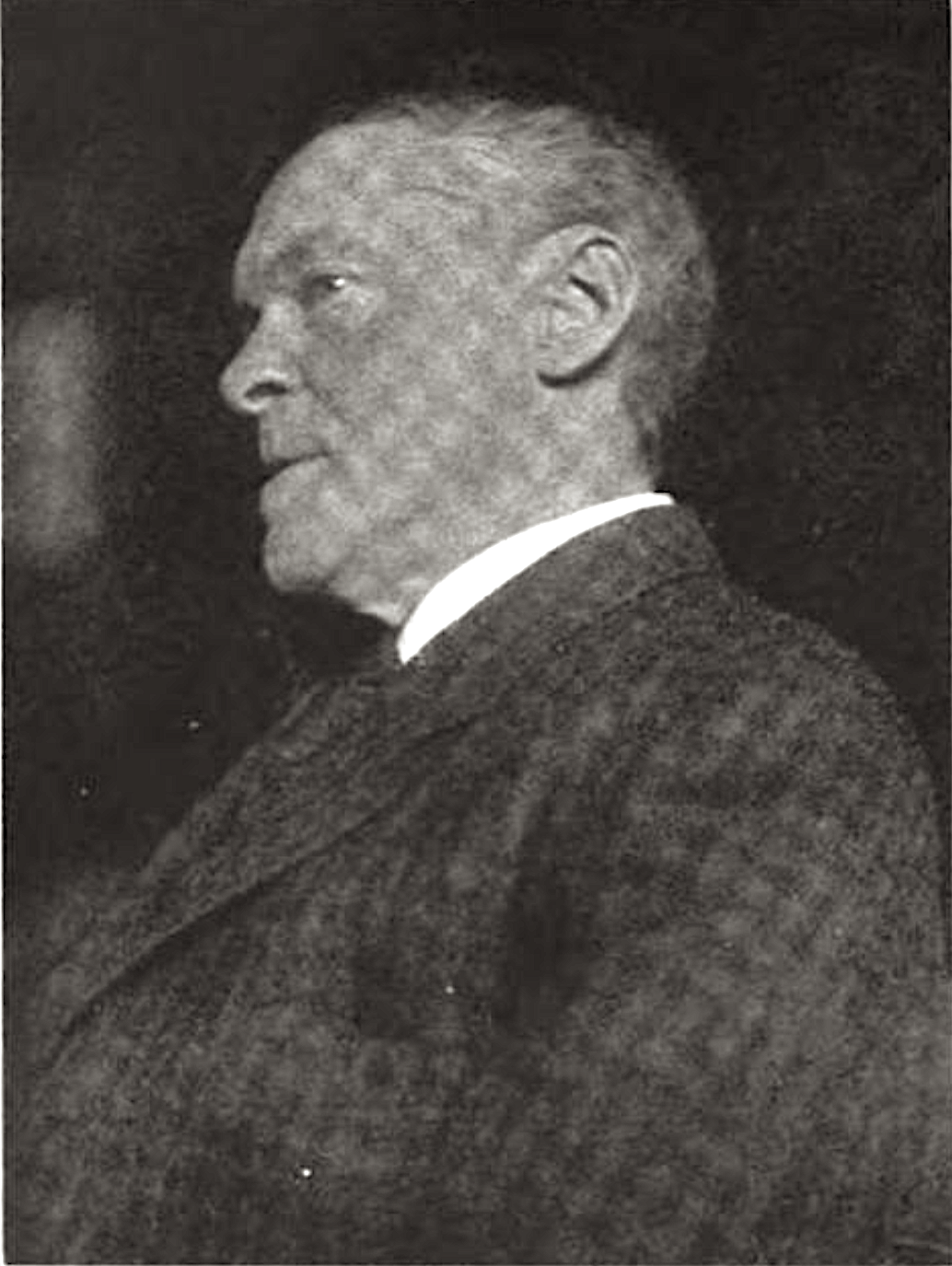
Arthur Foote

Choral

- The Farewell of Hiawatha, Op. 11, for mens voices (1885)
- The Wreck of the Hesperus, Op. 17 (1888)
- The Skeleton in Armor, Op. 28 (1891)
- O fear the immortals, ye children of men, Op. 46 (1900)
- Music for the Synagogue, Op. 53, musical service of the Jewish church (1900)
- Lygeia (text G. Rogers), for female chorus and orchestra, Op. 58 (1906)
- God is Our Refuge, anthem
- And There Were Shepherds, anthem
- Awake Thou That Sleepeth, anthem
- many part songs

Orchestral

- Suite in D major for strings, Op. 12 (fp. 15 May 1886, Boston Symphony Orchestra, Wilhelm Gericke)
- In the Mountains, Op. 14, overture (1886, fp. Boston 5 February, 1887, and at the Paris Exposition, 12 July, 1889)
- Suite in D minor for strings, Op. 21 (fp. 22 November 1889, Boston Synphony Orchestra, Arthur Nikisch)
- Francesca da Rimini, Op. 24 (1890), symphonic prelude (fp. Boston, 24 January, 1891)
- Serenade for Strings in E major, Op. 25 (reworking of movements from the two earlier Suites for strings)
- Cello Concerto in G minor, Op. 33 (1887-93)
- Suite in D minor for orchestra, Op. 36 (1895, fp. Boston, 6 March 1896)
- Four Character Pieces after the Rubaiyat of Omar Khayyam, Op. 48 (1900), orchestral arrangements of Op. 41 (fp. 13 December 1907, Chicago Orchestra, Frederick Stock)
- Suite in E major for strings, Op. 63 (1907) (fp. 16 April, 1909, Boston Symphony Orchestra, Max Fiedler)
- A Night Piece, for flute and strings (1922, arranged from Nocturno (1918), flute and string quartet) (fp. 13 April, 1923, Boston Symphony Orchestra, Georges Laurent, Pierre Monteaux)

Chamber

- Three Pieces for cello & piano, Op. 1 (1881)
- String Quartet No. 1 in G minor, Op. 4
- Piano Trio No. 1 in C minor, Op. 5 (1883)
- Three Pieces for violin & piano, Op. 9
- Sonata for violin & piano, Op. 20
- Scherzo for cello & piano, Op. 22 (1890)
- Piano Quartet in C major, Op. 23 (1890) (fp. Kneisel Quartet, Arthur Foote piano, Chicago)
- Three Pieces for oboe (or flute) & piano, Op. 31 (Flute = Op. 31B)
- String Quartet No. 2 in E major, Op. 32 (Finale performed separately as Tema con Variazione) (1893)
- Romanza for cello & piano, Op. 33 (piano reduction of slow movement of Cello Concerto, Op. 33)
- Piano Quintet in A minor, Op. 38 (1897)
- Melody for violin & piano, Op. 44
- Piano Trio No. 2 in B flat major, Op. 65 (1907–1908, fp. 8 December, 1908)
- Ballad for violin & piano, Op. 69
- String Quartet No. 3 in D major, Op. 70
- Two Pieces for violin & piano, Op. 74
- Legend for violin & piano, Op. 76
- Aubade for cello & piano, Op. 77 (1912)
- Sonata for cello & piano in E minor, Op. 78 (1912-18)
- Sonata for viola & piano, Op. 78A (1919)
- Nocturno & Scherzo for flute & string quartet, WoO. (1918, Nocturno, see also A Night Piece for strings) (fp. 28 January, 1919, San Francisco by Elias Hecht)
- At Dusk for flute, harp and cello, WoO
- Sarabande & Rigaudon for oboe (or flute), viola (or violin) and piano, WoO

Solo instrumental

- Trois Morceaux for piano, Op. 3 (c1877, pub. 1882)
- Cinq Pieces for piano, Op. 6 (1883)
- Suite No.1 in D ninor for piano, Op. 15 (1887, rev. 1915)
- Two Serenades for piano, Op. 18 (1887)
- Suite No.2 in C minor for piano, Op. 30
- Five Poems after Omar Khayyam, Op. 41 (1898)
- Six Pieces for organ, Op. 50 (1902)
- Twenty Preludes for the Piano in the Form of Short Technical Studies, Op. 52 (1903)
- Suite in D minor for organ, Op. 54 (1904)
- Meditation for piano, Op. 61 (1907)
- Compositions, seven pieces for organ, Op. 71
  - 'Cantilena in G'
  - 'Solemn March'
  - 'Sortie in C Major'
  - 'Canzonetta'
  - 'Tempo di Minuetto'
  - 'Communion'
  - 'Toccata'
- Five Silhouettes for piano, Op. 73 (1913)

Song

- 'Go, Lovely Rose' (1884, text Edmund Waller)
- Three Songs, Op. 10 (1885)
  - 'It was a Lover and his Lass' (William Shakespeare)
  - 'The Pleasant Summer's Come' (Robert Burns)
  - 'The Milkmaid's Song' (Alfred, Lord Tennyson)
- Five Songs, Op. 13 (1887)
  - 'O My Luve's Like a Red, Red Rose' (Robert Burns)
  - 'I'm Wearing Awa' to the Land o' the Leal' (text Lady Nairn)
  - 'Love Took Me Softly by the Hand' (Walter Richard Cassels)
  - 'Ho! Pretty Page, with Dimpled Chin' (William Makepeace Thackeray)
  - 'If You Become a Nun Dear' (Leigh Hunt)
- Eleven Songs, Op. 26 (1891)
  - 'Sleep, Baby, Sleep' (Elizabeth Prentiss)
  - 'Love Me, If I Live!' (Barry Cornwall)
  - 'The Night has a Thousand Eyes' (Francis William Bourdillon)
  - 'The Eden-Rose' (Rudyard Kipling)
  - 'Summer Longings' (Denis Florence MacCarthy)
  - 'To Blossoms' (Robert Herrick)
  - 'I Arise from Dreams of Thee' (Percy Bysshe Shelley)
  - 'My True Love hath My Heart (A Ditty)' (Philip Sydney)
  - 'In a Bower' (Louise Chandler Moulton)
  - 'The Water-Lily' (Emanuel Geibel)
  - 'How Long, Dear Love?' (Louise Chandler Moulton)
- 'Irish Folk Song' (1891, text Gilbert Parker) (first recorded by Johanna Gadski in 1908, Victor Red Seal 88117)
- 'Memnon' (1898, text Arlo Bates)
- 'Through the Long Days and Years' (1898, text John Milton Hay)
- 'The Red Rose Whispers of Passion' (1919, text John Boyle O'Reilly) (written for John McCormack)
- 'Song by the Mill' (1922, text Ethel Clifford) (written for John McCormack)
- 130 plus songs in total

== Recordings ==
- Music in America, Society for the Preservation of the American Musical Heritage (includes Suite in D minor, Op. 36), MIA 122 (1963)
- Skyscrapers, and other music of the American East Coast School (includes Suite in E major), EMI Classics 49263 (1987, reissued as Albany TROY235 (1997)
- Koussevitzky Conducts American Music (includes Suite in E major, 1940 recording), Pearl GEMM CD9492 (1991)
- Chamber Music Vol. 1 (includes Piano Quintet and String Quartets Nos. 2 and 3), Naxos 8.559009 (2000)
- Chamber Music Vol. 2 (includes Piano Quartet, String Quartet No. 1, Nocturne & Scherzo), Naxos 8.559014 (2000)
- Chamber Music Vol. 3 (includes Piano Trios Nos. 1 and 2, Melody and Ballad), Marco Polo 8.225117 (2001)
- 20th Century Works for Flute and Orchestra (includes A Night Piece), Centaur CRC2585 (2003)
- Francesca da Rimini (also includes Serenade, Four Character Pieces and Suite in E major), Naxos 8.559365 (2009)
- American Serenades (includes Serenade for Strings and Suite in E major), Dutton Epoch CDLX 7238 (2010)
- Complete Piano Music, Delos DE3442 (2014)
- American Romantics - The Boston Scene (includes Suite No. 1 in D minor for piano, Op. 15), Piano Classics PCL0080 (2015)
- American Romantics: Premiere Recordings of Turn of the Century Works for String Orchestra (includes 'Air & Gavotte' from Serenade for Strings), New Focus FCR166 (2016)
- American Moments (includes Piano Trio No. 2), Chandos CHAN10924 (2017)
- Music of the Night: American Nocturnes (includes Nocturne, Op. 6, No. 2 for piano), Danacord DACOCD783/4 (2017)
- American Pioneers (includes Suite in E major), Brilliant Classics 96086 (2021)
- 1919 Viola Sonatas (includes Viola Sonata, Op.78a), MSR CLASSICS MS1701(2022)
- Complete Cello Works, Delos DE3619 (2026)

== Works cited ==
- Tawa, Nicholas E. (1997). Arthur Foote: A Musician in the Frame of Time and Place. Scarecrow Press. ISBN 978-0-8108-3295-4.
