= George Whitefield Chadwick =

American composer (1854–1931)

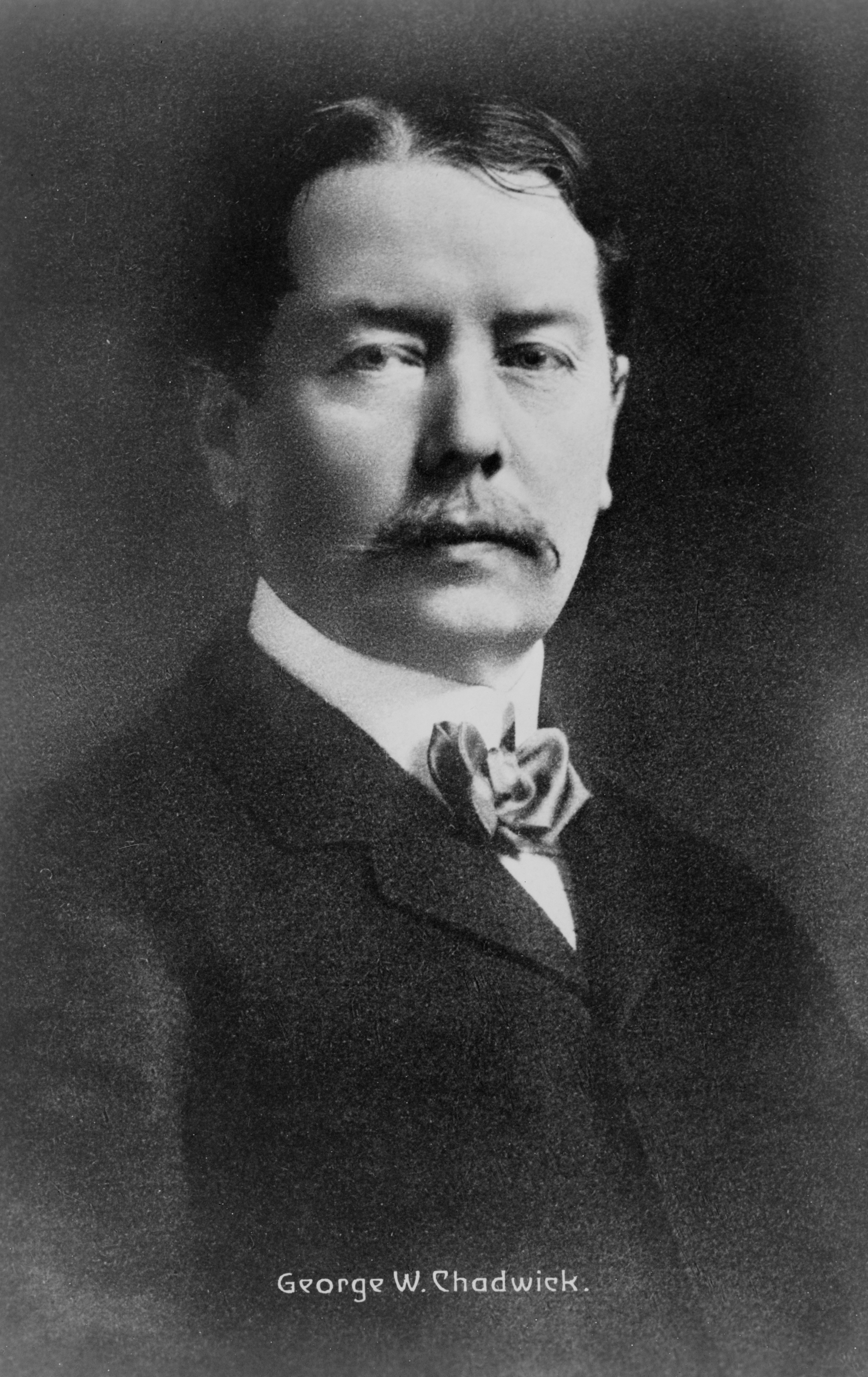
- George Whitefield Chadwick, c. 1890–1910
- Born: November 13, 1854; Lowell, Massachusetts, U.S.
- Died: April 4, 1931 (aged 76); Boston, Massachusetts, U.S.
- Education: New England Conservatory
- Occupation: Composer
- Years active: 1876–1931

George Whitefield Chadwick (November 13, 1854 – April 4, 1931) was an American composer. Along with John Knowles Paine, Horatio Parker, Amy Beach, Arthur Foote, and Edward MacDowell, he was a representative composer of what is called the Second New England School of American composers of the late 19th century. Chadwick's works are influenced by the Realist movement in the arts, characterized by a down-to-earth depiction of people's lives.

His works included several operas, three symphonies, five string quartets, tone poems, incidental music, songs and choral anthems. Along with a group of other composers collectively known as the Boston Six, Chadwick was one of those responsible for the first significant body of concert music by composers from the United States.

== Early life ==
Born in a rural part of Lowell, Massachusetts, Chadwick received some early musical training from organ lessons given by his older brother, Fitz Henry. He developed an independent, self-reliant character early in his life. Dropping out of high school in 1871, Chadwick assisted briefly in his father's insurance business. The experience enabled him to travel to Boston and other cities, where he attended concerts and cultural events that might have initiated his lifelong interest in the arts.

== Works, career, and influences ==
=== Student days ===
Chadwick entered New England Conservatory (NEC) as a "special student" in 1872, so that he could study with the faculty without satisfying the rigorous entrance or degree requirements. However, he approached his studies seriously and took advantage of what NEC offered. Chadwick studied organ with George E. Whiting (1840–1923), piano with Carlyle Petersilea (1844–1903), and theory with Stephen A. Emery (1841–1891), each of whom was well respected in the Boston music scene. He also pursued studies with Eugene Thayer.

In 1876, Chadwick accepted a faculty position in the music program at Olivet College and was a valued instructor as well as administrator. While at Olivet, Chadwick founded the Music Teachers National Association. The first evidence of his interest in composing appeared during this time, from a performance of his Canon in E♭ dated 6 November 1876.

Realizing that his musical career in the U.S. would be limited without further studies in Europe, in 1877 Chadwick headed to Germany like many other composers of his generation. He studied in Leipzig at the Royal Conservatory of Music under Carl Reinecke (1824–1910) and Salomon Jadassohn (1830–1902).

Chadwick's most significant compositions as a student there include two string quartets (no. 1 1877-8, no. 2 premiered 1879) and the concert overture Rip Van Winkle. They helped confirm his position as a promising young American composer among his German contemporaries, from whom he received favorable critiques.

After his two-year stay in Leipzig, Chadwick traveled around Europe with a group of artists who called themselves the "Duveneck Boys". They were led by the young and charismatic Frank Duveneck, who was well known for his portrait works in the style of Velázquez. The group was based in Munich, then major culture center second to Paris. Chadwick also stayed in France with the group, where he was taken with the French lifestyle and influenced by the emerging Impressionist movement.

Chadwick resumed his compositional studies with Josef Rheinberger (1839–1901) at the Hochschule für Musik in Munich. Rheinberger was known as a skilled musical craftsman who incorporated polyphony with creativity and clarity. Thus Chadwick benefited from Rheinberger's extensive knowledge of the classics, both instrumental and choral.

=== Return to Boston ===
Chadwick returned to Boston in March 1880 and soon began establishing a career in the U.S. He opened a teaching studio and secured two performances of Rip Van Winkle. Chadwick completed his First Symphony, which although not particularly inspired was a significant early contribution by an American composer.

In addition to his compositional activities, Chadwick was a performing organist and avid conductor. He served as the music director of the Springfield Festival from 1890 to 1899, and of the Worcester Music Festival from 1899 to 1901.

In 1897, Chadwick was appointed director of New England Conservatory. Known in the Boston arts circle as talented, personable, and energetic, he was crucial in transforming NEC into a respectable school of music. Chadwick implemented features that resembled those of the German conservatories of his experience. He established a variety of performing ensembles, and students were required to take more music theory and history classes.

He invited members of the Boston Symphony Orchestra as private teachers to the students, along with being an inspiring teacher himself. His students described him as "demanding, though fair-minded and witty". Among his pupils were Horatio Parker, William Grant Still, Arthur Whiting, Wallace Goodrich, Frederick S. Converse, Florence Price, Henry Hadley, and Edith Noyes Porter.

=== Involvement with Phi Mu Alpha Sinfonia Fraternity ===
He had some influence in the establishment of Phi Mu Alpha Sinfonia music fraternity, which was established at the conservatory in the fall of 1898, primarily through the suggestion of the name "Sinfonia" from a student organization to which he had belonged in Leipzig, Germany. He was named an honorary member of the Alpha chapter at the conservatory, and was later named a national honorary member of the Fraternity in 1909.

== Music ==
Chadwick composed in almost every genre, including opera, chamber music, choral works, and songs, though he had a particular affinity for orchestral music. His music can be categorized into four style periods:

1. The Formative Period, 1879–1894
2. The Americanism/Modernism Period, 1895–1909
3. The Dramatic Period, 1910–1918
4. The Reflective Years, 1919–1931

=== The formative period (1879–1894) ===
During this time, Chadwick utilized his training as a student in Leipzig, favoring sonata form, diatonic harmony, and regular phrasing and rhythms. The Symphony No. 1 in C major, Symphony No. 2 in B♭ major, and Symphony in F (No. 3) followed the four-movement outline, model after composers like Ludwig van Beethoven, Felix Mendelssohn, Robert Schumann, and Johannes Brahms. Nonetheless, the Second and Third Symphonies exhibit original aspects such as pentatonic scales, along with the Scots-Irish folk style in the Second Symphony.

His important early overtures are Rip Van Winkle, Melpomene, and Thalia. Set around Washington Irving's tale of the same name, Rip Van Winkle was his first orchestral work that established his claim to fame in Europe and America. Melpomene is a rich and lush work reminiscent of Wagner, and the comedic Thalia is imitative of Mendelssohn's light and lively style. A choral/orchestral piece, The Lily Nymph, presents a mixture of techniques borrowed from Mendelssohn and Impressionism.

Among his chamber works, the First String Quartet and Second String Quartet demonstrate a solid knowledge of developmental procedures as well as inventiveness, while the Third String Quartet (1882?-1886) displays more mastery in instrumentation.^{p. 13.} The Quintet for Piano and Strings is a lyrical work that show a melodic gift despite some awkward moments.

Chadwick's first work for the theatre was The Peer and the Pauper, an imitation of Gilbert and Sullivan operas which were then popular in the U.S. His burlesque opera Tabasco was an outlet for his own wry wit, featuring a humorous plot, comically named characters, and popular-style music. It opened in New York in 1894 and toured the United States for a year. The Grove Encyclopedia says it offered:

...a veritable anthology of popular styles, including a 'Plantation Ballad', a Spanish 'Bolero', an Irish 'Ditty' and a French 'Rigaudon', most of them designed as set pieces to show off the talents of the first performers. But Chadwick also composed complex musical numbers that advance the plot and demonstrate his command of the extended finale as employed by Sullivan...

=== The Americanism/Modernism period (1895–1909) ===
Here Chadwick is asserting his own musical style more than previously, as in the concert overture Adonais. It includes multiple sections, muted strings, and harps to generate an ethereal quality, unconventional rhythms, and occasional chromaticism. The critic William Foster Apthorp stated:

It is the most modern in spirit of anything I know from his pen... He has outgrown the classic idea... The very character of the thematic material in Adonais is modern, in sharp contrast to the classic reserve shown in the Melpomene overture; the expression is more outspoken, more purely emotional and dramatic.

Chadwick further delved into the symphonic genre with his Symphonic Sketches, Sinfonietta, and Suite Symphonique. All have the conventional four-movement pattern, but he created a gossamer atmosphere with humorous themes, programmaticism, modality (pentatonic melodies), and Impressionism. The orchestration contains unexpected elements such as bass clarinet cadenzas, saxophone solos, extended brass solos, and large percussion batteries.

His Fourth String Quartet, composed around the same time as Antonín Dvořák's String Quartet in F (op. 96, "American"), displays a more American folk style than his Fifth String Quartet, with catchy tunes and pentatonic third-movement fiddle melodies.

Chadwick composed more stage works, notably Judith, based on the tale from the Apocrypha. The piece is melodic and exotic, much like Camille Saint-Saëns's Samson et Delilah.

In his Ecce jam noctis for chorus and orchestra composed for Yale University's 1897 commencement ceremony, Chadwick weaved in rhythmic twists like triple-meter strings against the static and homophonical chorus. Lochinvar is another distinctive choral piece with a Celtic flavor, featuring a baritone voice with a violin solo just before the "Introduction of Strathspey" section.

In 1903, Chadwick composed his Theme, Variations, and Fugue for organ and orchestra. Some 20 years later, Chadwick's friend and former student, John Wallace Goodrich, arranged the work for organ solo. It was not until 2011, however, that a pair of letters was discovered in which Chadwick himself officially acknowledged Goodrich's handiwork in making and publishing the organ solo version. It remains the composer's best-known organ work.

=== The dramatic period (1910–1918) ===
During this period, Chadwick shifted from overtures and symphonies to a more dramatic and programmatic style. At this point, he was more interested in musical effects than in form and construction.

His two representative works are the tone poems Aphrodite and Tam O'Shanter, both for large orchestra. The compositions are both highly episodic, programmatic and well-orchestrated. Aphrodite evokes a majestic image of the sea, and Tam O'Shanter (based on the tale by Robert Burns) is a work of musical story-telling of similar caliber as some of Richard Strauss's pieces, such as the latter's Don Quixote.

Chadwick's most important stage work from this period is The Padrone, based on the realistic plight of Italian immigrants in the North End of Boston. It has a distinctive verismo style (realistic action integrated with a lyrical score). Although Chadwick considered this to be one of his finer works, it was not performed until 1995, when it was premiered by the Waterbury Symphony and conductor Leif Bjaland at the Thomaston Opera House.

He wrote a number of patriotic songs during World War I, including These to the Front, The Fighting Men, and perhaps his best known, Land of Our Hearts, first performed in the Norfolk Festival in June 1918, featuring a fluid syllabic setting of a poem by John Hall Ingram.

=== The reflective years (1919–1931) ===
By this time, Chadwick was an established musician who was no longer writing with his previous level of creative output. The Anniversary Overture to celebrate his 25th anniversary as the director of New England Conservatory was described as scholarly.

His output significantly declined during these years, and he was more of a musical administrator and socialite among the elite Bostonians. He remained well respected until his death in 1931, after which his works became more obscure but nonetheless considered important contributions to the American music repertoire.

== Music theory ==
In 1897 Chadwick published Harmony, a music theory text. In this work, Chadwick is the first theorist to combine the Roman-numeral analysis of Gottfried Weber with the old figured bass symbols, to create an "absolute" system which shows the chord root and the inversion in a single symbol (e.g. V7, I6).
