= George Whiting =

American composer of classical music

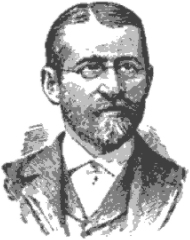
- Born: George Elbridge Whiting; September 14, 1840; Holliston, Massachusetts
- Died: October 14, 1923 (aged 83); Boston, Massachusetts
- Occupation: Composer
- Spouse: Helen Aldrich (m. 1867)

George Elbridge Whiting (September 14, 1840 – October 14, 1923) was an American composer of classical music.

== Early life ==
George Whiting was born in Holliston, Massachusetts on September 14, 1840. He founded the Beethoven Society in Hartford, Connecticut when he was fifteen years old. He moved to Boston, Massachusetts in 1862 and later to New York City.

== Career ==
Whiting was a student of George Washbourne Morgan. He went to Liverpool, England, and studied with William Thomas Best. He later studied in Berlin with Carl August Haupt (harmony), Robert Radecke (orchestration), and others.

Whiting worked in various positions in Albany, New York and Boston. He succeeded John Henry Willcox as organist and choir master at the Church of the Immaculate Conception on the south side of Boston, where he composed his masses in C minor, F minor, and E♭ major.

In 1874, Whiting became organist of the Music Hall in Boston, Massachusetts. In 1878 he went to the Music Hall in Cincinnati, Ohio. During the 1870s he also taught organ to his nephew, composer Arthur Whiting.

Whiting was also for a time head of the organ department in the New England Conservatory. Among his pupils was Henry Morton Dunham.

== Personal life ==
Whiting married Helen Aldrich on April 30, 1867, and they had one child.

== Death ==
Whiting died in Jamaica Plain, Boston on October 14, 1923.

== Musical works ==
His compositions include:

- Mass in C minor (1872)
- Mass in F minor (1874)
- Mass in F minor (undated)
- Dream Pictures (1874)
- The Tale of the Viking (1878 cantata)
- Leonora (1893 opera)
- Henry of Navarre (cantata)
- March of the Monks of Bangor (cantata)
- some pieces for orchestra
- several songs
- music for organ
- music for piano

He wrote several published texts, including:

- The Organist (Boston, 1870)
- The First Six Months on the Organ (Boston, 1871)
