= Alice Carter Simmons =

American musician (1883–1943)

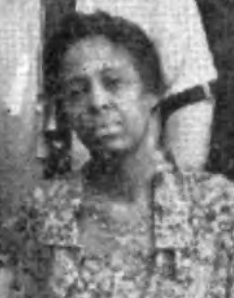
- Alice Carter Simmons, from a 1925 issue of The Crisis
- Born: March 1883; Hollandale, Mississippi, US
- Died: March 30, 1943 (aged 60); New York, New York, US
- Occupations: Musician, music educator
- Relatives: Booker T. Washington (uncle); Margaret Murray Washington (aunt); Roscoe Simmons (brother)

Alice Carter Simmons (March 1883 – March 30, 1943) was an American pianist, organist, and music educator. She was the founding secretary of the National Association of Negro Musicians (NANM), and was head of the instrumental music program at Tuskegee Institute beginning in 1916; she also taught at Fisk University.

== Early life and education ==
Simmons was born in Hollandale, Mississippi, the daughter of Emory Peter Simmons and Willie Murray Simmons. Her father, born under slavery, was a school principal. Her aunt Margaret Murray Washington was the third wife of Booker T. Washington. Her brother was journalist and lecturer Roscoe Simmons.

Simmons completed teacher training at Tuskegee Institute in 1903, graduated from Fisk University in 1908, and pursued further training as a pianist at the Oberlin Conservatory of Music in 1908 and 1909, completing a Bachelor of Music degree in 1930. In the late 1930s, she was working on a master's degree at Columbia University.

== Career ==
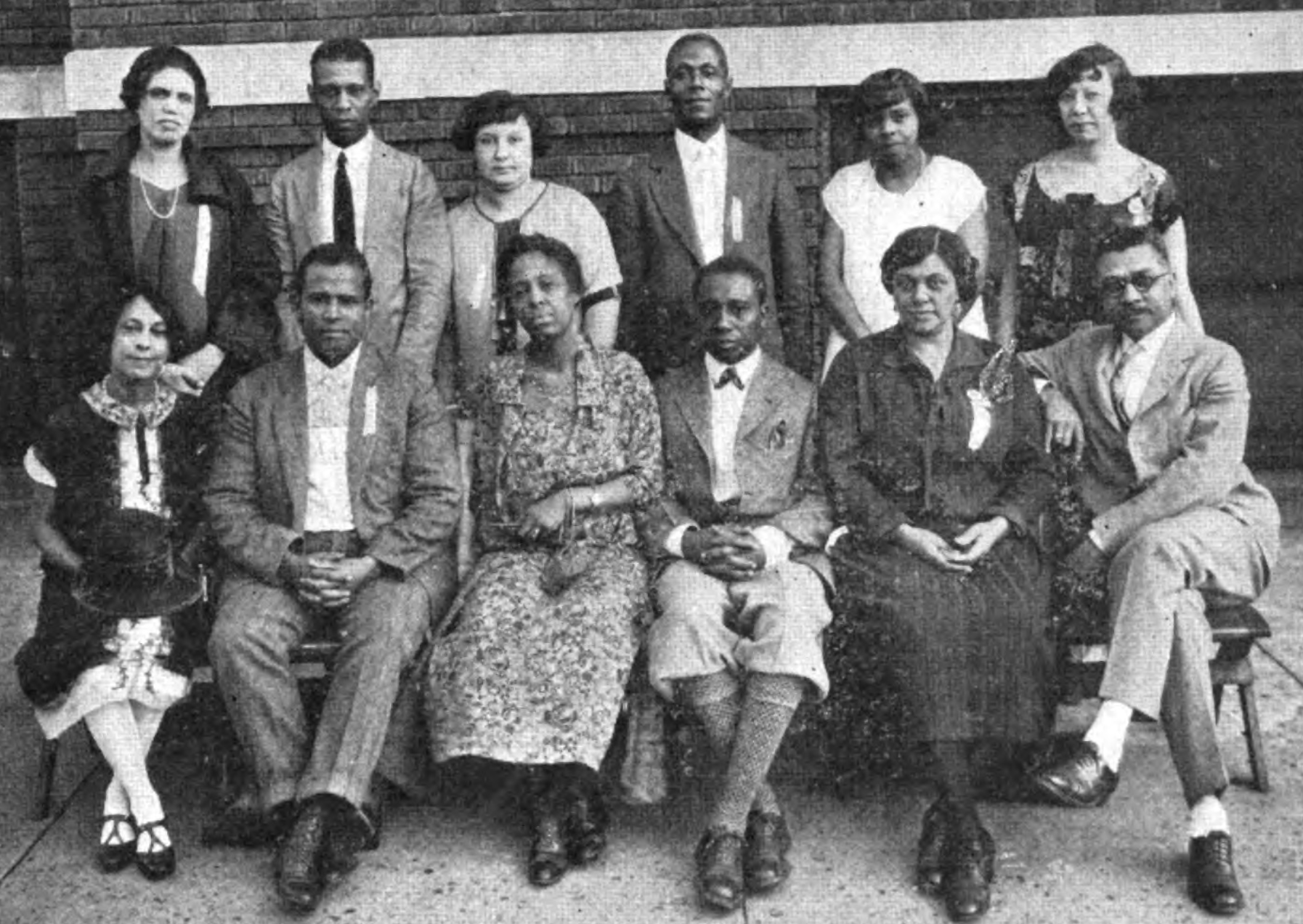
The newly-elected officers of the National Association of Negro Musicians in 1925; standing, from left, Camille Nickerson, Henry Grant, Lillian Lemon, J. Wesley Jones, Lillian Carpenter, Adelaide Herriot; seated, from left, Mildred Bryant Jones, Carl Rossini Diton, Alice Carter Simmons, Robert Nathaniel Dett, Martha Broadus Anderson, and Clarence Cameron White.

In 1910, Simmons played the first-night concert to open the Morton Theatre in Athens, Georgia. From 1910 to 1911, she was on the faculty of the Elizabeth City State Teachers College in North Carolina. In 1916, she became head of the division of instrumental music at Tuskegee Institute. One of her Tuskegee students was composer William L. Dawson. She accompanied singer Cleota Collins and violinists Clarence Cameron White and H. Harrison Ferrell in concerts at Tuskegee.

She was founding secretary of the National Association of Negro Musicians, when it organized in 1919. In 1931, she helped organize a choir competition at Fisk University. She became secretary-treasurer of NANM in 1922, remained on the board through the mid-1920s, and was active at the organization's national conventions into the 1930s.

In her last years, she was director of Club Caroline, a residence for Black working women in New York City.

== Personal life ==
Alice Carter Simmons died from complications after surgery in 1943, aged 60 years, at a hospital in New York City. In 1944, the Los Angeles chapter of the NANM held a memorial concert for Simmons and her colleagues Robert Nathaniel Dett and Maude Roberts George. Naida McCullough was one of the musicians featured.
