= Mildred Bryant Jones =

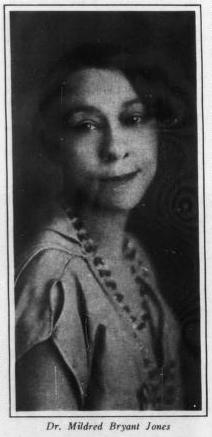
- Born: Mildred Bryant; 16 November 1887; Macon, Georgia
- Died: 15 February 1966 (aged 78); Chicago, Illinois
- Education: Fisk University, New England Conservatory of Music, Northwestern University, Loyola University of Chicago
- Occupation(s): Musician, teacher, choral director
- Employer: Wendell Phillips Academy High School
- Organization: National Association of Negro Musicians

Mildred Bryant Jones (16 November 1887 – 15 February 1966) was an African American musician and teacher, an officer of the National Association of Negro Musicians, and a friend of W. E. B. Du Bois, who was said to have had 'a special passion and admiration' for her. She was the first African American appointed as Director of Music at Wendell Phillips High School, Chicago, and an influence on a number of significant figures while there, including Harold Washington and Timuel Black.

== Life ==
Mildred Bryant was born in Macon, Georgia, to Henrietta (née Smith) and Champion Bryant. She was educated at Fisk University, the New England Conservatory of Music, and Northwestern University. Bryant married Brinton Sylvester Jones in 1919 in Louisville, Kentucky. She obtained her bachelor's degree in music from the Lyceum Arts Conservatory in 1921, and her master's degree in 1923 from the Cosmopolitan School of Music and Dramatic Art, Chicago. In 1928, she earned a doctorate in music from the National University of Music, Chicago. She studied voice culture, violin, orchestration, and composition, and spent two summers studying abroad in France and Germany.

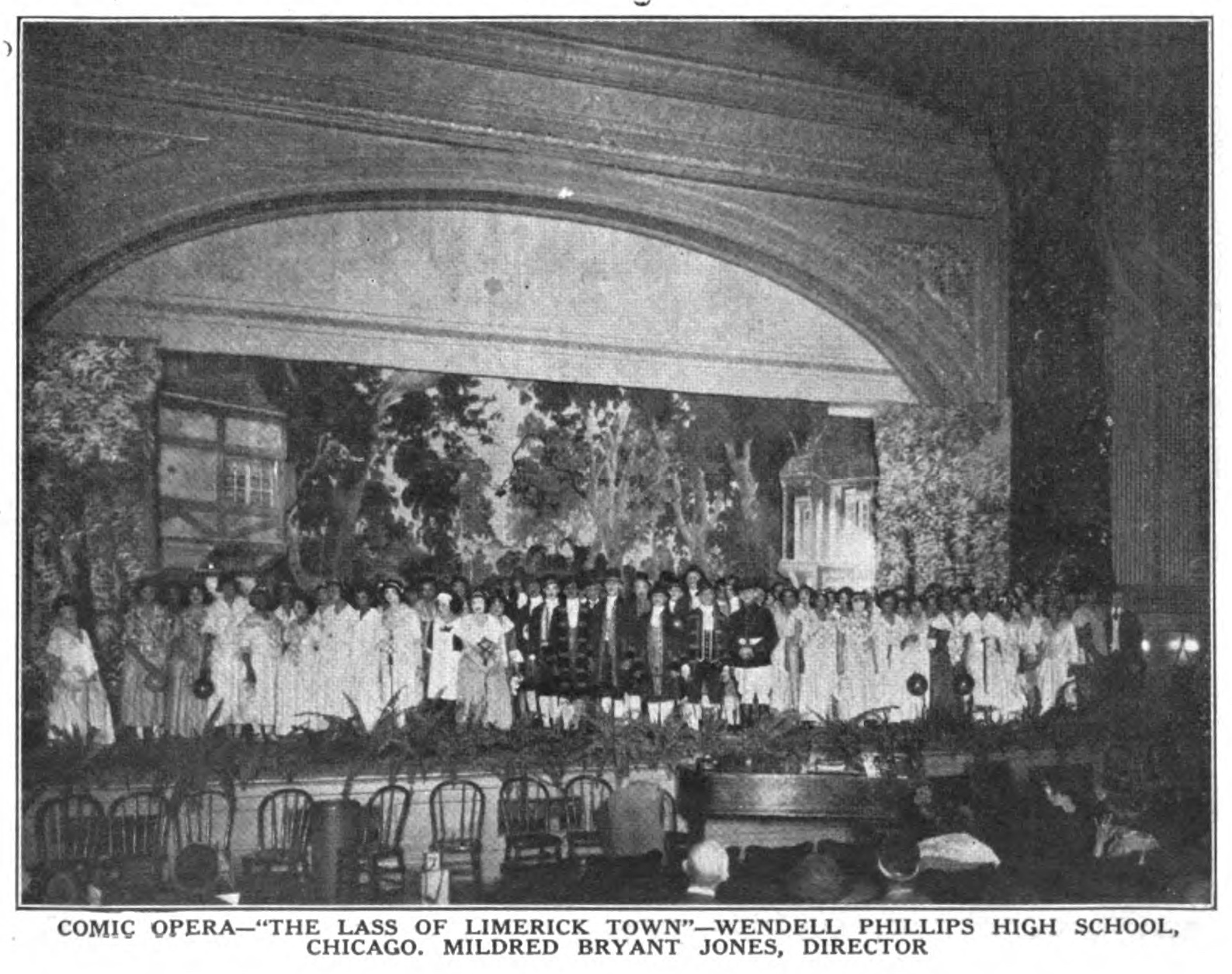
Comic Opera directed by Mildred Bryant Jones at Wendell Phillips High School, 1921

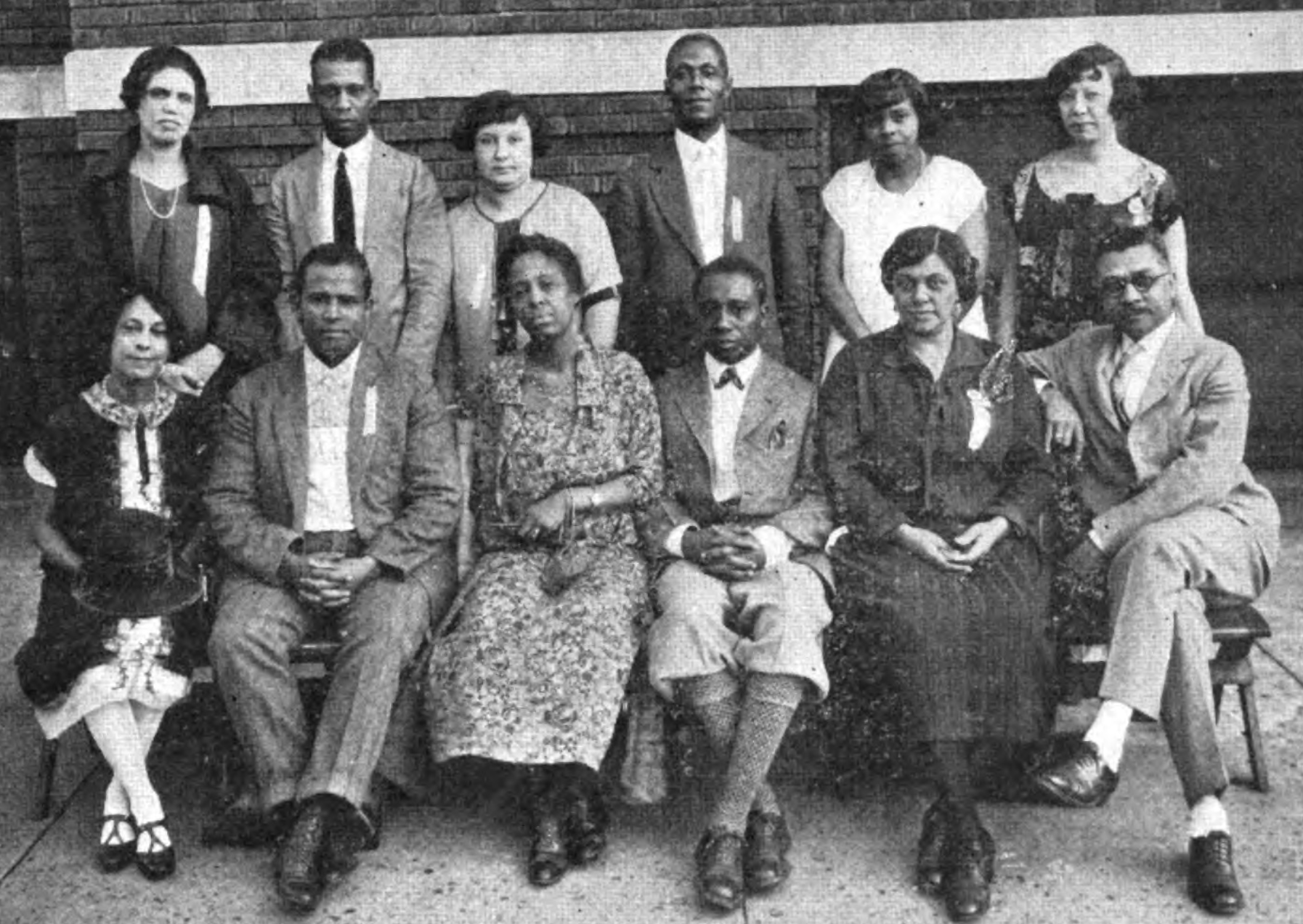
The newly elected officers of the National Association of Negro Musicians in 1925; standing, from left, Camille Nickerson, Henry Grant, Lillian Lemon, J. Wesley Jones, Lillian Carpenter, Adelaide Herriot; seated, from left, Mildred Bryant Jones, Carl Rossini Diton, Alice Carter Simmons, Robert Nathaniel Dett, Martha Broadus Anderson, and Clarence Cameron White.

Between 1909 and 1918, she was Supervisor of Music in the Louisville public school system, before becoming Director of Music at Wendell Phillips High School, Chicago. Bryant Jones' efforts to progress in her career against significant discrimination were described in The Crisis:

When Mildred Bryant Jones, formerly of Louisville and now of Chicago, sought to take the examination for musical director in the high schools of Chicago, every effort was made to persuade her not to do so. When she finally appeared before the examiners they sat fully five minutes quite dumb looking at this apparition of a petite brown woman. Finally she said, "Is it really as bad as all that?" Then someone smiled and the examination took place in December, 1918. At first they wanted to segregate her and have her examined in a room by herself without supervision. This she refused.

Later, she was told that she had failed the examination, and when this was challenged told that the papers had been destroyed. She offered to sit the exam again, and did:

Thereupon she received a notice that she had passed but was not told what percentage she had made. She was appointed to night work in the Wendell Phillips High School in September, 1919, and was refused even substitute day work. In April, 1920, in spite of the opposition of the white principal, Mrs. Jones was finally appointed musical director in that school, January 31, 1921. Thereupon she learned that all the time she had stood highest in the examination but that she was not appointed because “such matters were difficult of adjustment’’!

In Chicago, Bryant Jones was said to occupy 'an outstanding place among the teachers of the city'. Her pupils at Wendell Phillips included gospel singer and pianist Roberta Martin, singer and teacher Maurice Cooper, and jazz and operatic singer William Franklin. Another student, Dan Burley, described the dedication of the staff at Wendell Phillips High School, singling out Bryant Jones in particular. He recalled how these 'extraordinary' teachers taught an 'all black student body... to appreciate our musical background, while they prepared us to go out into the world and make our own way in it.' In 1931, at the Competition Festival of the Senior High School Choral groups of the city of Chicago, held at Orchestra Hall, the 55-strong choir led and trained by Bryant Jones won. They were described as the best choir 'that has ever sung in Chicago schools,' and the performance as the 'most thrilling' and 'the outstanding feature of the entire show.' Another pupil of Bryant Jones was Harold Washington, the first African American mayor of Chicago. He recalled that she would often mention W.E.B. Du Bois as 'an excellent role model for her students to follow':

She told us about DuBois' scholarly achievements and demanded we pursue excellence the same as he did. I was impressed.

In 1935, Bryant Jones received a Master of Arts degree from Loyola University Chicago, with a thesis on 'The Relation of Thaddeus Stevens to Reconstruction, 1865–1868'. In 1940, she obtained her PhD in history on the same subject.

Bryant Jones died in 1966.

== Personal life ==
Bryant Jones was a Catholic.
