= Maude Roberts George =

American musician

- Maude Roberts George, from a 1936 newspaper
- Born: Maude J. Roberts; September 27, 1888; Jersey City, New Jersey, US
- Died: December 1, 1943 (aged 55); Chicago, Illinois, US
- Other name: Maud Roberts George
- Occupations: Singer, arts administrator, music writer
- Known for: President, National Association of Negro Musicians (1933–1935)

Maude Roberts George (September 27, 1888 – December 1, 1943) was an American singer, arts administrator, and music critic. She was president of the National Association of Negro Musicians (NANM) from 1933 to 1935. She was also president of the Chicago Music Association, and a music critic for The Chicago Defender newspaper.

== Early life ==
Maude J. Roberts was born in Jersey City, New Jersey, the daughter of Joseph Henry Roberts and Alice C. Johnson Roberts. Her mother was born in Virginia and her father was born in North Carolina. She graduated from Walden University in Nashville, Tennessee in 1907, and from the Bryant & Stratton in Chicago in 1908.

== Career ==
Roberts, a soprano concert singer, taught music at Walden University from 1909 to 1911, and at Lane College from 1911 to 1913. She was a soloist in the 1915 All Colored Composers Concert in Chicago, and with an orchestra in Washington D.C. in 1916. In 1918, she was a soloist in a large choral concert in Chicago; one of the other soloists was George Garner.

In 1927, George directed a musical pageant, "Ethiopia Lifts as She Climbs", at the National Association of Colored Women convention in Chicago. In 1930 she sang on a program of "race music" in Chicago.

She directed another musical production, "Festival of Music" featuring George Garner, for the same organization's 1933 convention in Chicago. George supported Black classical musicians and composers in her work, and personally raised the funds for a 1933 concert of works by Florence Beatrice Price performed by the Chicago Symphony Orchestra.

George was president of the National Association of Negro Musicians from 1933 to 1935. She was succeeded by Howard University music instructor Camille Nickerson. She was also a founder and president of the Chicago Music Association, and a music critic for The Chicago Defender newspaper. She served on the board of directors of the Cook County League of Women Voters, and was president of the Illinois State Association of Colored Women's Clubs, and served on many arts and political organization boards in Chicago. George also deserves credit for having directly facilitated the 1933 premiere of the First Symphony of Florence B. Price in the 1933 Century of Progress World's Fair in Chicago. The minutes of the Chicago Music Association record that George paid $250 (about $5,093 in 2021 dollars) so that the symphony would be performed.

== Personal life ==
Maude Roberts married judge Albert Bailey George in 1918; they had a son, Albert Roberts George (1918–1983). Her husband died in 1940. Later in 1940, her son accidentally shot and wounded her in their home. She died in 1943, aged 55 years, in Chicago.

In 1944, the Los Angeles chapter of the NANM held a memorial concert for George and her NANM colleagues Robert Nathaniel Dett and Alice Carter Simmons, who also died in 1943. Naida McCullough was one of the musicians featured. The papers of the Chicago Music Association are held at the Amistad Research Center, Tulane University.
