= Delores Ivory Davis =

American opera singer

Delores Ivory Davis is a soprano, known internationally for her performances in opera, oratorio, and performances with the Springfield (Mass.) Symphony, St. Paul Symphony, and Detroit Symphony Orchestra. She has performed in the Broadway musical Porgy and Bess as Serena and in the televised performance of Treemonisha as Monisha alongside Obba Babatundé.

== Biography ==
Davis was born on January 7, 1939, to Henry Ivory and Willa Mae Frazier Ivory, both musicians. She began her study of voice at the age of fourteen. She is a graduate of Cass Technical High School in Detroit, Michigan. She received her B.S. in Music Education from Wayne State University. Her sister, Barbara Ivory Williams, was her accompanist until she moved to New York.

In her college years, she won a number of National Vocal Competitions including the National Association of Negro Musicians, the National Usher Board Voice Competition, a John Hay Whitney Award, The Black Business Women's Association- Vocal Division, The National baptist Convention Scholarship Award, the Martha Baird Rockefeller Grant, and a nomination for the Drama Desk Award for "Best Supporting Actress" for her performance in the Broadway musical Porgy and Bess for her role as Serena from the N.Y. Music Critics.

Davis made her debut at Carnegie Hall in 1970 which won her critical acclaim. She has performed major oratorios in New York as a soloist with the New York Opera - Title III Program; was an Artist-in-Residence with the St. Paul Opera Company and has been a soloist at Radio City Music Hall. Singing as Serena, Clara, and Bess, she has performed in the United States, Israel, New Zealand, Australia, Italy, Switzerland, France, and Spain.

She has studied with Ollie McFarland, Avery Crew, Celeste Cole, Edward Boatner, Claire Gelda, Carolina Segrera Holden and David Nisstad. She was a soloist in the Brazeal Dennard Chorale, The Michigan Opera Theatre, the Rackham Symphony Choir, St. Matthew's and St. Joseph's Episcopal Church, and Christ Church Detroit. She was also formerly the conductor of the Plymouth Chorale. Davis retired from the music staff of the Hartford Memorial Baptist Church after having served for over twenty years.

In 2015, Davis received a Career Arts Achievement Award in the Field of Music from Wayne State University, her alma mater. The award was bestowed by the College of Fine, Performing and Communication Arts.

== Sources ==
- Carnovale, Norbert, George Gershwin: a bio-bibliography, Greenwood Publishing Group, 2000, pp. 69 and 71. ISBN 0-313-26003-6
- Michigan State Chamber of Commerce, The Negro in Michigan, 1969 p. 57
- Ping-Robbins, Nancy R., Scott Joplin: a guide to research, Routledge, 1998, p. 314. ISBN 0-8240-8399-7
- Smith, Eric Ledell, Blacks in opera: an encyclopedia of people and companies, 1873-1993, McFarland, 1995, p 101. ISBN 0-89950-813-8
