= Broome Records =

First US owned African American record label

Broome Special Phonograph Records
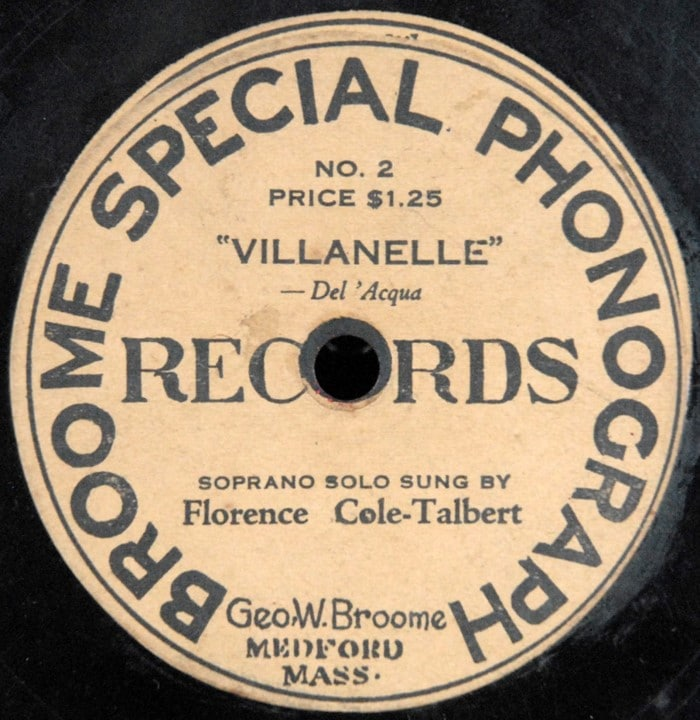
- Founded: 1919
- Founder: George W. Broome
- Defunct: 1923
- Status: Inactive
- Country of origin: US
- Location: Medford, Massachusetts

Broome (Special Phonograph) Records was the first African American owned and operated record label in the United States. Established by George W. Broome in 1919, Broome focused on promoting black concert artists who faced discrimination from the major labels. The label stopped selling records in about 1923 but remainders were supposedly still being sold as late as the 1950s.

The recordings were made in New York City, but in what studio they were made and where they were pressed is not known. Broome did not have its own studio so it most likely used one of the independent studios and pressing plants then active. Contrary to some modern speculation, they were not recorded or pressed by Columbia. (Black Swan was the first African American owned label to record and press their own records.) Broome sold its products by mail order and did little advertising although it placed a few national ads in The Crisis. They are extremely rare today. George Broome's recordings, as well as his film work, could be considered part of the racial uplift movement.

== History ==
George Wellington Broome was born in Brooklyn, New York in 1868 and had what appears to have been a difficult childhood, living for a time in the Colored Orphan Asylum on 143rd Street. In his early twenties he helped organize a Black social club in New York as well as a Black political club, making connections in both political and cultural circles. After attending Howard University from 1894-1896, studying medicine, Broome started printing sheet music, including one of Will Marion Cook's earliest compositions.. He also managed for a time two notable theatrical touring companies, Clorindy, or the Origin of the Cakewalk and O.M. McAdoo's Australian musical troupe.

In about 1900 he married Mary Ellis and moved to Medford, Massachusetts, where he established a small business and worked in a variety of roles as a porter, laborer, and waiter, while retaining ties to the theatrical world. A son, Charles Broome, was born in 1906.

By 1909, using his own capital and with the help of other Black businessmen, he established the Broome Exhibition Company to produce some of the very first full-length African American documentary films, designed to show what African Americans could achieve. One of the first, A Trip to Tuskegee, was filmed at Tuskegee Institute in 1909 and debuted in 1910. As part of his work, Broome formed working relationships with both Booker T. Washington and W. E. B. Du Bois. The films are now believed to be lost.

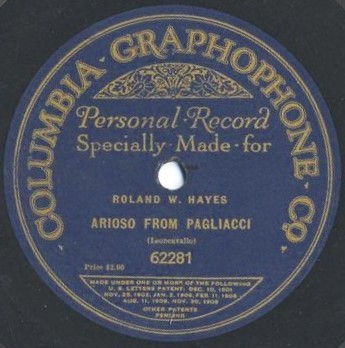
Hayes' record (1918)

In 1917 Broome began working as a sales agent for tenor Roland Hayes, with his home address sometimes acting as Hayes business address. Working with Broome, Hayes became the first African American concert artist to record, contracting with Columbia to record and press the records, selling them at his concerts, through agents, and by mail. Hayes' personal records were only available through 1918 while he was touring.

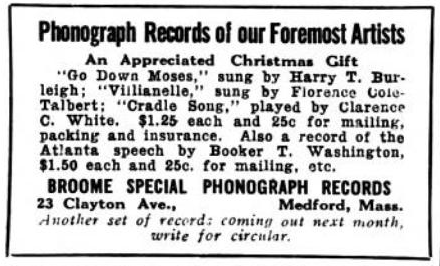
The Crisis, December 1920

Broome saw the need within the African American community for commercial recordings of serious Black performers outside stereotypical Vaudeville and minstrelsy. Using his deep connections in the Black cultural world, he established his own mail order catalog company in September 1919 to sell his records and sheet music from his home. Most of Broome's records were original recordings, made in an unidentified studio in New York City (where most labels and studios were then headquartered). It is not known which studio and pressing plant were used, but it was probably one of the independent studios and plants then active in and around the city. There is some speculation that they were pressed by Gennett, since an unissued test pressing exists with a Broome recording on one side and an English recording leased by Gennett on the other side (with no label). Broome also issued a speech by Booker T. Washington recorded years earlier by Columbia as a personal recording (Washington had died in 1915). The first three Broome issues were advertised in the January 1920 issue of The Crisis.

The consensus amongst record collectors is that Broome stopped actively selling records in 1923, although he may have continued to sell remainders after that. Since no files or catalogs are known to exist, the exact number of issues released is unknown. Only nine are known.

Though few in number, Broome recordings are important historical documents that preserve some of the most important Black concert artists of the early 20th century, at a time when no other label would record them. Indeed, some of its artists recorded nowhere else; and some (White, Dett) are creator recordings by composers playing their own compositions.

== Discography ==
The first three records, issued in late 1919, were singled sided. These were followed by the Booker T. Washington special issue (No. A) in late 1920 and then a second series of original recordings, which were double-sided and styled "Brown Seal Records," probably issued in late 1921 or 1922.

Three label variations have been reported: Black lettering on a light tan background (most common), red lettering on a brown background (No. A), and black lettering on a blue background.

No. 1 "Go Down Moses"-Harry Burleigh

No. 2 "Villanelle"-Florence Cole Talbert

No. 3 "Cradle Song"- Clarence Cameron White

No. A "Atlanta Exposition Address"-Booker T. Washington

No. 51 "Go Down Moses-Harry Burleigh / Sometimes I Feel Like a Motherless Child"-Edward H. S. Boatner

No. 52 Dell' Acqua: "Villanelle"-Florence Cole Talbert / "Lament"-Clarence Cameron White

No. 53 "Cradle Song" / -Clarence Cameron White / "My Mother Bids Me Bind My Hair"-Antoinette Garnes

No. 54 "I Don’t Feel Noways Tired"-Edward H. S. Boatner / "Barcarolle" from "In the Bottoms"-Robert Nathaniel Dett

No. 55 "Nobody Knows de Trouble I've Seen"-Florence Cole Talbert / "Mammy" from "The Magnolia Suite"-Robert Nathaniel Dett

Unnumbered test pressing: "Villanelle"-Florence Cole Talbert / "So Near the Kingdom"- Robert Carr and Ethel Toms (White singers)
