= Somebody's Knocking at Your Door =

American spiritual

"Somebody's Knocking at Your Door", sometimes given as "Somebody's Knocking" and "Somebody's Knockin ' at Yo' Door", is a spiritual. The song's music and text has no known author, but originated among enslaved African Americans on Plantation complexes in the Southern United States sometime in the early 19th century.

== Publications and arrangements ==
"Sombebody's Knocking at Your Door" has been published numerous times; including publication within 54 different hymnals catalogued at Hymnary.org. The Hampton Institute (now Hampton University), a historically black college included the spiritual in its 1874 anthology of spirituals edited by Thomas P. Fenner, Religious Folk Songs of the Negro: As Sung on the Plantations, which was subsequently republished in 1909. John Wesley Work Jr., director of the Fisk Jubilee Singers of Fisk University, created one of the earliest known choral arrangements of the spiritual that was written sometime in the first years of the 20th century. Because he never registered a copyright, he lost claim to the rights of this arrangement. John Bunyan Herbert wrote an arrangement for men's chorus which was published in Rodeheaver Collection for Male Voices: One Hundred and Sixty Quartets and Choruses for Men (1916).

One of the more well known arrangements of the spiritual for solo voice dates to the year 1919. It was written by the Canadian-American composer Robert Nathaniel Dett. Dett's arrangement for solo voice was popularized by Edward Boatner who sang the arrangement in concerts and church services throughout the United States. Dett also wrote SSA (1921) and SATB (1939) choral arrangements of "Somebody's Knocking at Your Door". Norman L. Merrifield (1906-1977) published a men's chorus arrangement in 1942, and Clarence Cameron White published a mixed chorus arrangement in 1955.

== Lyrics ==
Somebody's knockin' at your door;
Somebody's knockin' at your door;
O sinner, why don't you answer?
Somebody's knockin' at your door.

Knocks like Jesus,
Somebody's knockin' at your door.
Knocks like Jesus,
Somebody's knockin' at your door.
O sinner, why don't you answer?
Somebody's knockin' at your door.

Can't you hear him?
Somebody's knockin' at your door.
Can't you hear him?
Somebody's knockin' at your door.
O sinner, why don't you answer?
Somebody's knockin' at your door.

Jesus calls you,
Somebody's knockin' at your door.
Jesus calls you,
Somebody's knockin' at your door.
O sinner, why don't you answer?
Somebody's knockin' at your door.

Can't you trust him?
Somebody's knockin' at your door.
Can't you trust him?
Somebody's knockin' at your door.
O sinner, why don't you answer?
Somebody's knockin' at your door.

== Recordings ==
- Sung by Edna Thomas on 78 rpm, coupled with Rock O' My Soul (1924), Columbia Records
- Sung by Edna Lewis on the album I Been Buked and I Been Scorned; Gwine-a Lay Down Mah Life for Mah Lawd/Somebody's Knockin' at Your Door! (1928), Columbia Records
- Sung by Roland Hayes on the album Evening with Roland Hayes (1953), LP record, Heritage Productions
- Sung by The Jordanaires on the album Gloryland (1959), LP Record, Capitol Records
- Sung by Frank Davis on the album 16 Spirituals My Father Taught Me (1960), LP record, DeWitt Records Inc.
- Sung by Old Fashioned Revival Hour Quartet on the album The Distinguished Old Fashioned Revival Hour Quartet (1965), LP record, Word Records
- Sung by Ingemar Olsson on the EP Ingemar Olsson: Somebody's Knocking at Your Door / No Man Is An Island (1970), Teamton (Sweden)
- Sung by the New Swing Quartet on their 1974 self titled album. Made for Radiotelevizija Slovenija.
- Performed by Craig Duncan and The Smoky Mountain Band on the album Deep River (1995), Music Row Audio
- Sung by the Moses Hogan Chorale on the album Songs of Reflection (1997), MGH Records
- Performed by The John Tesh Project in a medley with the hymn "Let us break bread together" on the album Pure Hymns (2000), FaithMD Music
- Performed by Vincent Nilsson & The World Sextet on the album More Spirituals!: Vincent Nilsson & The World Sextet (2005), Storyville Records
