= Uzee =

Uzee is a given name or surname. Notable people with the name include:

- Uzee Brown Jr. (born 1950), American musician
- Uzee Usman (born 1986), Nigerian actor and film producer
- Philip D. Uzee (1914–2010), American historian and economist
