= Dennard =

Dennard may refer to:

== People with the surname ==
- Alfonzo Dennard, a professional American football cornerback, cousin to Darqueze
- Amery Dennard, known as Big Herk, an American rapper
- Brazeal Dennard, an American singer and educator
- Darqueze Dennard, a professional American football cornerback, cousin to Alfonzo
- Kenny Dennard, an American former professional basketball player
- Mark Dennard, a former professional American football center
- Preston Dennard, a former professional American football wide receiver
- Robert H. Dennard, an American electrical engineer and inventor

== Places ==
- Dennard, Arkansas

== Other uses ==
- Dennard scaling, a scaling law based on a 1974 paper co-authored by Robert H. Dennard, above
