= Manet Harrison Fowler =

American opera singer (1895–1976)

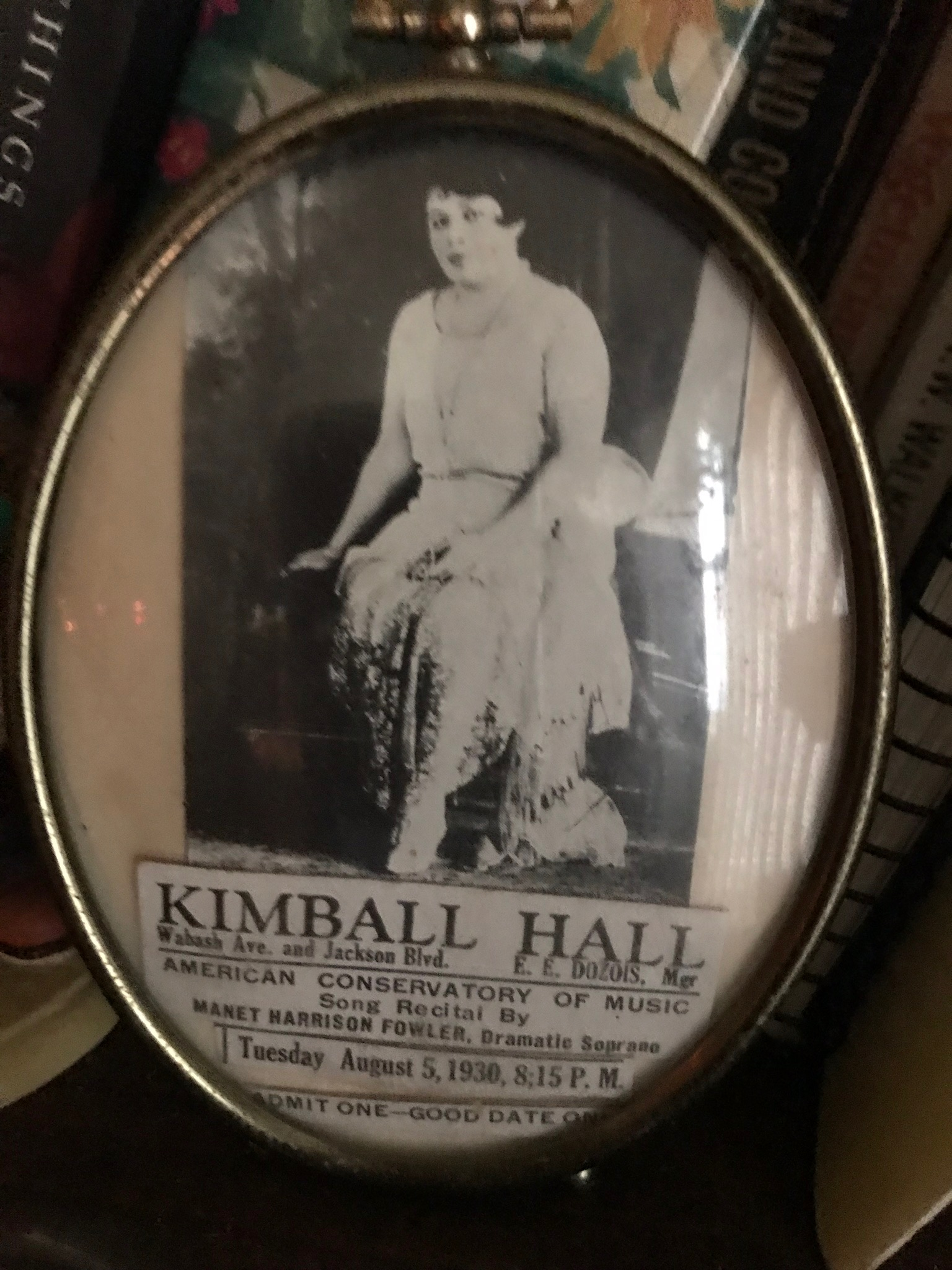
- Fowler in 1930
- Born: Minnia Helen Harrison; August 30, 1895; Fort Worth, Texas, U.S.
- Died: February 1976 (aged 80–81); New York, U.S.
- Education: Tuskegee Institute
- Occupations: Musician, Educator
- Known for: Manet’s African series paintings grace the galleries of Chaney College, Tuskegee and Yale.
- Notable work: African series, Dante by the Bridge
- Spouse: Stephen H. Fowler (m. 1915–1965)

Manet Harrison Fowler (August 30, 1895 — February 1976) was an American musician, dramatic soprano, artist, voice coach, piano teacher, conductor, music educator and midwife. She was a child prodigy, giving piano recitals at the age of six. A native of Fort Worth, Texas she founded the Mwalimu School for the development of African Music and Creative Art in 1928 and relocated to New York City during the Harlem Renaissance. She was President of the Texas Association of Negro Musicians (TANM), the first state branch of the National Association of Negro Musicians.

== Early life ==
Minnia (later respelled "Manet") Helen Harrison was born in Fort Worth, Texas, to Louisiana natives Taylor Henry Harrison, an African American and Carrie Vickers Harrison, a creole of African, French and Irish descent. She showed talent for music from an early age, playing piano at church from age six. Manet attended the Tuskegee Institute, and graduated in 1913. She pursued further studies in visual arts at The Art Institute of Chicago and in music at the Chicago Musical College and American Conservatory of Music. A well known painter of her time, she was also an opera singer performing around the country as a dramatic soprano.

== Career ==
Fowler taught music at Prairie View State Normal and Industrial College, and directed a church choir in Fort Worth. She was co-founder of the Texas Association of Negro Musicians in 1926, and she served on the board of the National Association of Negro Musicians, as scholarship committee chair, and edited its journal, The Negro Musician.

In 1928, she started the Mwalimu School. She moved the Mwalimu program to Harlem in 1932, where (as the Mwalimu Center for African Culture) it became a contribution to the Harlem Renaissance. Literary figures such as Carter G. Woodson taught at Mwalimu in Harlem. The school also offered a community kitchen, a library of works by black authors, and lessons from bodybuilding to comparative religion. The school's Mwalimu Festival Chorus performed often in New York, and made recordings, under Fowler's direction; they were called "one of the outstanding Negro choral groups in technical proficiency" by Alain LeRoy Locke.

In 1930, a pageant Fowler wrote, produced, and directed, The Voice, was performed by over 2000 cast members at the National Baptist Convention in Chicago. She also wrote Up From Slavery, and another musical piece, African Suite. Several paintings by Manet Harrison Fowler are in the Juneteenth Museum in Fort Worth. A portrait she painted of her daughter Manet Helen Fowler is in the permanent collection at Yale University Art Gallery.

In 1972, Fowler was honored alongside Duke Ellington, Ramsey Lewis, Everett Lee, and Margaret Rosezarian Harris at the annual awards dinner at the Waldorf Astoria, New York for the National Association of Negro Musicians.

== Personal life ==
Manet Harrison married fellow educator Stephen Hamilton Fowler in 1915. They had five children, including Manet Helen Fowler, the first African American woman to earn a Ph.D in cultural anthropology in the U.S. and George H. Fowler, former Commissioner of the NYS Division of Human Rights and the first African American named to a cabinet rank by Governor Nelson Rockefeller. Manet Harrison Fowler was widowed in 1965, and died in 1976, aged 80 years, in New York. The Manet Harrison Fowler and Manet Helen Fowler Papers are archived together at the Beinecke Library at Yale University. Another collection of her papers is at Emory University.
