= Antoinette Garnes =

American soprano

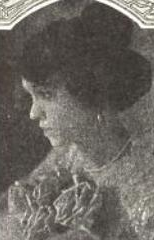
- Antoinette Garnes, from a 1919 publication.
- Born: c. 1887; Detroit, Michigan
- Died: July 2, 1938; Cape Girardeau, Missouri
- Education: Central High School (Detroit); Howard University; Detroit Conservatory of Music; Chicago Musical College
- Occupations: Soprano singer, music educator
- Employer(s): Chicago Grand Opera Company; Wilberforce University; Hampton University; Lincoln University (Missouri)

Antoinette Smythe Garnes (about 1887 – July 2, 1938) was an American soprano singer active in the 1920s.

== Education ==
Antoinette Smythe Garnes was born about 1887 in Detroit. She studied at Detroit Central High School, Detroit Conservatory of Music, Howard University, and Chicago Musical College; at the last institution she studied with Edoardo Sacerdote, earned a bachelor of music degree in 1919, and was the college's first black winner of the Alexander Revell diamond medal. She also played violin and piano. She earned a Master of Music degree from the Chicago Musical College in 1920.

== Career ==
In 1923 Garnes was the only African American member of the Chicago Grand Opera Company. She was a member of the Chicago Opera Association. Erma Morris accompanied her for a performance in Detroit. She sang at a meeting of the NAACP in Chicago in 1919. Music critic Agnes Beldon noted Garnes's "sterling vocal ability and fine training". Her solo recitals were sponsored by local black women's clubs, and benefited charities such as the Phyllis Wheatley Orphan's Home in Wichita. She performed with Naida McCullough in California in 1932. She also performed at Howard University with Sadie B Davis under the auspices of the Alpha Kappa Alpha Sorority.

Garnes taught voice at Lincoln University, Wilberforce University and Hampton Institute. She recorded on Harry Pace's Black Swan Records, and her recording of two arias was promoted as "the first grand opera record ever made by a colored singer." She was given an honorary membership in the Alpha Kappa Alpha sorority at the organization's boule (annual meeting) in 1923.

== Personal life ==
Antoinette Smythe Garnes married twice; her first husband was Rev. Dr. Theobold Augustus Smythe. She was widowed when he died in Chicago. Her second husband was dentist Harry W. Garnes. She died from liver disease in 1938, in Cape Girardeau, Missouri.

== Discography ==
- "Caro Nome" (1923) Black Swan Records 7101
- "Ah, F'ors 'E Lui" (1923) Black Swan Records 7102
- "My Mother Bids Me Bind My Hair" Black Swan Records

== See also ==
- Broome Records
