= Nathaniel Dett Chorale =

The Nathaniel Dett Chorale
- Origin: Toronto, Ontario, Canada
- Instrument: A cappella
- Years active: 1998–present
- Website: nathanieldettchorale.org

The Nathaniel Dett Chorale is a Canadian choral group that specializes in Afrocentric music of all styles including classical, spirituals, gospel, jazz, folk, and blues. It is named after the Canadian-born Black composer and musician R. Nathaniel Dett (1882–1943), who had a long teaching career in the United States. The group has performed in the Maritimes, Quebec, Manitoba, Western Canada, the United States, and France. The Chorale has been supported by the Canada Council for the Arts.

== Nathaniel Dett ==
Canadian-born Black musician and composer Nathaniel Dett studied piano as a child. He worked as a church organist in Niagara Falls, Ontario, Canada, from 1898 to 1903. He graduated from Oberlin College with a Bachelor of Music in 1908, and later studied composition with the French composer Nadia Boulanger. Dett taught at Lane College in Jackson, Mississippi; Hampton Institute in Virginia; Samuel Houston College in Austin, Texas; and Bennett College in Greensboro, North Carolina. At the Eastman School of Music he earned a Master of Music degree in 1932. He won prizes from Harvard University for his article entitled The Emancipation of Negro Music and for a motet, "Don't Be Weary, Traveller". Dett edited several published collections of folk songs and spirituals, and served as president of the National Association of Negro Musicians from 1924 to 1926.

== History ==
The Chorale was founded in 1998 by Brainerd Blyden-Taylor, who continues to be the director of the group.

As well as touring throughout Canada, the Chorale also performed at the Pollyfolia choral festival in France in 2004 and at the U.S. Library of Congress in 2007.

In 2009, the group performed at the inauguration of Barack Obama.
