= Sharon Rogers =

Sharon Rogers is the name of:

- Sharon Rogers (model) (1942–2022), a Playboy Playmate of the Month for January 1964
- Sharon Elery Rogers (1929–2022), American composer, music educator, and organist
