= John Henry at Hampton =

1913 American film

John Henry at Hampton: A Kind of Student Who Makes Good is a 1913 American film made to promote Hampton Institute. It was made after the 1909 film A Trip to Tuskegee about Tuskegee Institute, which was followed up on with the 1913 film A Day at Tuskegee. The films were shown to African American audiences at segregated venues such as theaters and churches. The film depicted the transformative positive influence of a Hampton education.
