= Broome Exhibition Company =

American film company

Broome Exhibition Company was an early film company in the United States focused on producing social uplift films for the African American community. It led a film project inspired by Booker T. Washington for Tuskegee Institute. It also corresponded with W. E. B. Du Bois in 1917 about plans to produce a film catalogue about accomplished African Americans. Du Bois responded to a request for names with a letter to George Broome listing many. Broome exhibited the Tuskegee film along with actualities and a short of cotton production operations and the Tenth Cavalry. Tuskegee officials including Washington preferred to control and carefully manage exhibition of the film for fundraising activities rather than have it shown commercially to African American audiences.

== Filmography ==
- A Trip to Tuskegee (1909)

== See also ==
- African American cinema
