= Albert J. McNeil =

American choral conductor (1920–2022)

Background information
- Born: Albert John McNeil; February 14, 1920; Los Angeles, California, U.S.
- Died: November 29, 2022 (aged 102) Rancho Mirage, California, U.S.
- Occupations: Conductor, ethnomusicologist, author/editor
- Formerly of: Albert McNeil Jubilee Singers

Albert John McNeil (February 14, 1920 – November 29, 2022) was an American choral conductor, ethnomusicologist, author, and founder of the Albert McNeil Jubilee Singers. His career was dedicated to upholding choral music traditions with the presentation of Negro spirituals and concert music by African American composers. He was Professor Emeritus of Music at the University of California, Davis, where he was director of choral activities and developed the Music Education Program.

== Early life and education ==
McNeil was born in Los Angeles, California on February 14, 1920.

McNeil earned a bachelor's and a master's degree at the University of California, Los Angeles, and did his doctoral studies at the University of Southern California, the Westminster Choir College of Princeton, and the University of Lausanne, Switzerland. Among his teachers were Raymond Moreman, Charles Hirt, J. Finley Williamson, Roger Wagner, Howard Swan, and Jester Hairston. Dr. McNeil received an Honorary Doctor of Fine Arts degree from California State University, Northridge and Westminster Choir College.

== Activities ==
McNeil began his career as a music teacher in Los Angeles elementary, junior, and senior high schools and from there moved on to the University of California, Davis. In addition to that, he became director of the choir at the Congregational Church of Christian Fellowship and Guest Director and Lecturer with the Canadian Choral Conductors in Halifax, Nova Scotia. He was director of Music at the Founder's Church of Religious Science and a member of the board of the Los Angeles Master Chorale, the Neighborhood Music School, and Chorus America. He was also a life member of the American Choral Directors Association. He was formerly, for ten years, Director of the Sacramento Chorale and co-founded the Sacramento Symphony Chorus. He also served two terms as member of the Choral Panel, National Endowment for the Arts.

Albert J. McNeil was the author and editor of a series of music education textbooks.

== Personal life and death ==
McNeil died in Rancho Mirage, California on November 29, 2022, at the age of 102.

== Awards ==
McNeil is the recipient of several awards, including: Alumnus of the Year for Professional Excellence, presented by his alma mater, UCLA; The Michael Korn Founders Award for Development of the Professional Choral Art (1999), granted by Chorus America; and a Lifetime Achievement Award given by the American Choral Directors Association. He was also honored as a Sterling Patron of Mu Phi Epsilon.

== Recordings ==
- Albert J. McNeil and Roberta McLaughlin: Music Of The Black Man In America (Double LP), Bowmar Records, 1973
