= Roscoe Simmons =

American journalist (1881–1951)

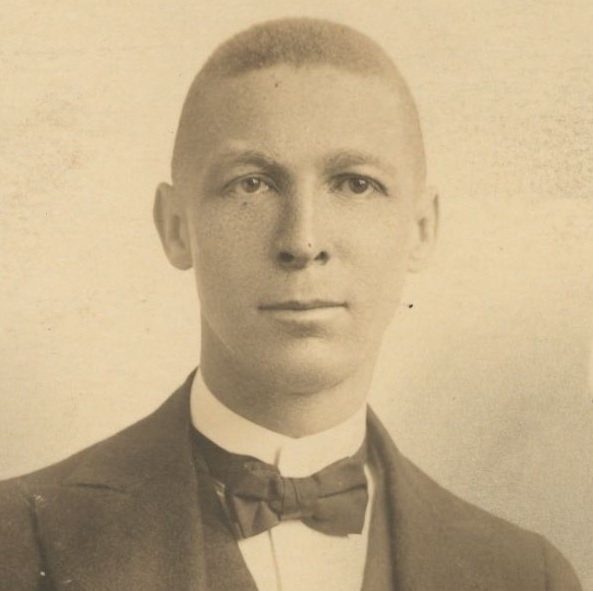
- Simmons c. 1910
- Born: Roscoe Conkling Simmons; June 20, 1881; Greenview, Mississippi, United States
- Died: April 27, 1951 (aged 69)
- Education: Tuskegee Institute
- Occupations: Journalist, activist
- Political party: Republican
- Relatives: Booker T. Washington (uncle); Margaret Murray Washington (aunt); Alice Carter Simmons (sister)

Roscoe Conkling Simmons (June 20, 1881 – April 27, 1951) was an American orator, journalist, and political activist. The nephew of Booker T. Washington, he wrote a column from Washington, D.C. about African-American issues for the Chicago Tribune and was influential in the Republican Party.

== Early life and education ==
Simmons was born in Greenview, Mississippi, in 1881. He was named after New York Republican U.S. Senator Roscoe Conkling. His sister was musician Alice Carter Simmons. Their father was principal at a school for African Americans in Hollandale, Mississippi. Simmons grew up in Aberdeen, Mississippi.

The nephew of Booker T. Washington through Washington's third wife Margaret Murray Washington, when he was 12 years old Washington secured a job for him as an office boy to U.S. Senator Mark Hanna, a millionaire industrialist and the personal friend of William McKinley. Simmons' childhood spent with Hanna began his lifelong association with Republican politics and he would remain close friends with the powerful Hanna family for the rest of his life. Simmons graduated from the Tuskegee Institute.

== Career ==
Simmons began his career as a reporter for the Pensacola Daily Press before moving to the Chicago Defender, where the growing popularity of his columns made him that newspaper's highest-paid employee and a staple of its front page. During World War I he reported from Europe on the conditions of African-American soldiers in the U.S. Army. During this time he earned the nickname "the Colonel," though reportedly never left Paris, having become "distracted by its allure and its women."

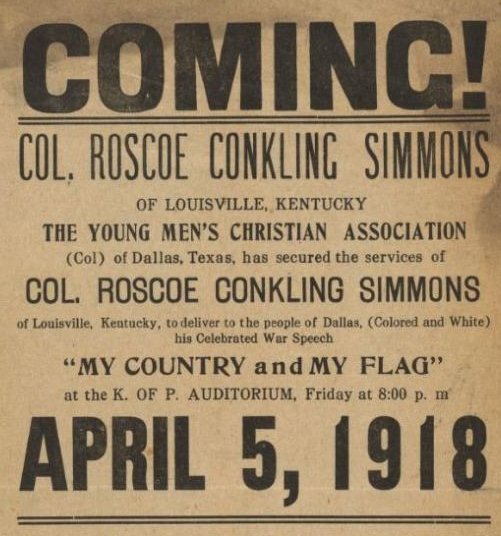
A 1918 promotional handbill advertising a speech by Roscoe Simmons

As part of a scheme by the Military Intelligence Division to elevate the prominence of patriotic black leaders as a counter to the perceived threat of subversion within the African-American community, Simmons was engaged in a nationwide series of lectures and speeches. Major Walter Loving served as his manager. Simmons quickly established a reputation for unparalleled oratorical skills, with William Jennings Bryan calling him "one of the great orators of the world." Promoted in advertisements as "America's greatest orator," W. Herbert Brewster even attributed a 1916 speech by Simmons as his motivation "to be somebody someday."

In his stump speech "My Country and My Flag", Simmons declared:

We have but one flag, the flag that set us free. Its language is our only tongue, and no hyphen bridges or qualifies our loyalty. Today the nation faces danger from a foreign foe, treason skulks and stalks up and down our land, in dark councils intrigue is being hatched. Woodrow Wilson is my leader. What he commands me to do I shall do. Where he commands me to go I shall go. If he calls me to the colors I shall not ask whether my colonel is black or white. I shall be there to pick out no color except the white of the enemy's eyes.

He was a member of the Colored Knights of Pythias. He delivered the main address in the 1929 general meeting.

In the 1920s, he worked as the editor of The Chicago Defender, a black weekly paper published out of Chicago, Illinois. While editor, he was president of the Lincoln League and helmed the Speaker's Bureau, Western Division.

In 1936, Simmons passed the bar and became a lawyer.

=== Republican Party ===
A lifelong Republican, Simmons was a driving force behind the party's lock on the African-American vote from the early 1900s through to the Great Depression. He formed part of the so-called "Old Guard," a triumvirate of black party insiders that wielded significant backroom influence within the GOP and which also included Perry Wilbon Howard and Robert Reed Church. In 1936 he arranged to have an all-white South Carolina delegation to the national convention replaced with an integrated slate.

Three times elected a delegate to the Republican National Convention, Simmons gave the second to the nomination of Herbert Hoover as candidate for the President of the United States at the 1932 convention. According to a report in the Pittsburgh Courier the day after the nomination, "his exit from the platform was blocked by senators, committeemen, governors, and others high in the public life who sought to touch the hem of his garment."

In 1936 Simmons was appointed chair of the Negro Speakers Bureau of the Republican Party, a group of prominent African-American GOP activists, by national committee chairman John Hamilton.

Simmons twice unsuccessfully ran for elective office on the Republican ticket. In 1929, he mounted a primary challenge against Oscar Stanton De Priest for U.S. House of Representatives from Illinois's 1st congressional district. In 1933, he ran for the Illinois State Senate against King Roberts.

=== Chicago Tribune ===
From 1943 until 1946, Simmons wrote several articles for the Chicago Tribune about African-American issues. Then, in 1946, he began writing a Washington, D.C.–based column called The Untold Story, featuring tales of successful African-Americans around the U.S. He wrote The Untold Story for the Tribune until his death in 1951. Topics included Fisk University, which is a historically Black colleges and universities, Gen. Douglas MacArthur and the Republican Party.

In 1951, Simmons was admitted, on behalf of the Chicago Tribune, to the Senate and House of Representatives press galleries; he was the third African-American to be allowed into the press gallery.

== Personal life ==
Simmons was married twice, and had three sons with his first wife: William, Thomas, and Roscoe. His second wife, Althea Amaryllis Merchant, was initiated into the Alpha Kappa Alpha sorority at the University of Illinois and would later serve as its regional director.

Simmons was the godfather to Walter Loving, Jr., the son of Walter Loving. His correspondence and personal papers are held at Harvard University, from which his oldest son, William, graduated.

In 1936, Simmons was baptized into the Catholic Church, as noted by a close friend.
