= Margaret Rosezarian Harris =

American conductor, composer and educator (1943–2000)

- Born: September 15, 1943; Chicago, Illinois
- Died: March 7, 2000 (aged 56)
- Citizenship: African-American
- Education: Juilliard School
- Occupation: musician
- Parents: Dewey Harris (father); Clara Townsend Harris (mother)

Margaret Rosezarian Harris (September 15, 1943 – March 7, 2000) was an American musician, conductor, composer, and educator, the first African-American woman to conduct the Los Angeles Philharmonic, the Chicago Symphony Orchestra, the Detroit Symphony Orchestra, and 13 other cities' orchestras.

== Early life and education ==
Margaret Rosezarian Harris was born in Chicago, Illinois, the daughter of Dewey Harris, a railroad mechanic, and Clara Townsend Harris, a dressmaker. At age 3, she was recognized as a musical prodigy, and gave her first piano recital at Chicago's Cary Temple Auditorium, performing more than twenty short pieces from memory. She toured the United States as a child performer until age 6. At age 10, after performing a movement from Mozart's Piano Concerto no. 20 (on November 17 and December 1, 1953) with the Chicago Symphony Orchestra, she won a scholarship to the Curtis Institute of Music in Philadelphia, and moved there with her mother. Her father didn't come to Philadelphia, and he stayed in Chicago. Harris and her mother visited him. Margaret Harris earned undergraduate and master's degrees, with highest honors, from the Juilliard School.

== Career ==
In 1970, she took over the role of musical director for the Broadway production of Hair, conducting an orchestra of seven older male musicians. Later she worked on the Broadway musical adaptations Raisin and Two Gentlemen of Verona, among other shows. She moved between popular and classical contexts. Among her compositions were two ballets, an opera, and a piano concerto. She was co-founder of Opera Ebony. "All I care about is that music be good, and that it communicate with a broader public, without special introductions of apologies. All those barriers between pop and classical are snobbish, artificial." The National Association of Negro Musicians honored Margaret R. Harris in 1972 for her achievements. In 1975, she became the first black woman to conduct the Detroit Symphony Orchestra, and the first woman to conduct there in over forty years. She worked with Ruby Dee, who was an actress. She had been a host of a radio show. Her audition for a Schepp Scholarship was in 1964. At colleges, she had been a lecturer.

In 1995, Harris went to Tashkent, Uzbekistan for six weeks to consult on a production of Porgy and Bess. The Information Service of the United States Embassy "sent [her] to Tashkent,".

Margaret R. Harris died in 2000 on March 7, aged 56 years, in New York City, after a heart attack. She was about to take up an appointment at associate dean of the Pennsylvania Academy of Music at the time of her sudden death.

== Compositions ==
- "Concerto No.1" The instrumentation is for piano and orchestra.
- "Concerto No.2" The year for the piece is 1971, and the instrumentation is for "piano, electric bass, drums, orchestra"
- "Introspections" The year for the piece is 1993 and the instrumentation is for violin and orchestra.
- Collage One (1970)
- Dear Love (1970)
- Grievin' (1970)
- Tonite's Goodbye (1970)

== Quotes ==
- " 'When people get to know me,' she said, 'they understand that, deep down, I don't really represent a race or a sex. Not significantly, anyhow. I just represent me.' "
- " 'Women must keep applying themselves and be persistent, no matter how many refusals they receive,' says Harris. 'Now, I must pass that torch on..' "
