= Detroit Conservatory of Music =

Music school in Detroit, Michigan

Coordinates: 42°21′26″N 83°3′54″W

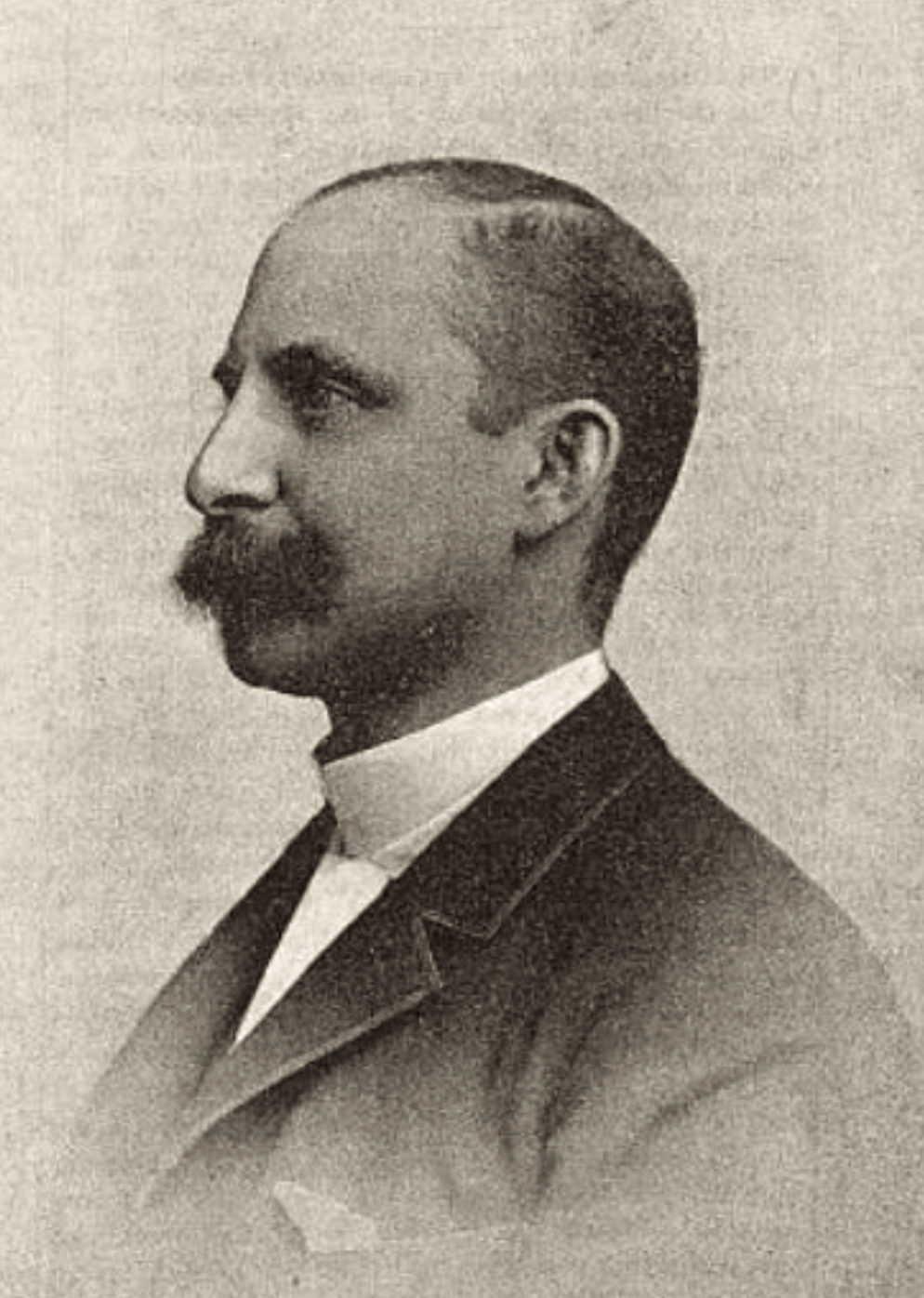
J. H. Hahn, founder of the Detroit Conservatory of Music

Detroit Conservatory of Music was a music school in Detroit, Michigan. It was considered one of the leading institutions of music in the United States. It was founded in 1874 by J. H. Hahn and opened a normal school training department in 1889.

It was located at 5035 Woodward Avenue. In 1909 the Detroit Conservatory Orchestra was organized at the school.

Chapters of Mu Phi Epsilon, Sigma Alpha Iota, and Phi Mu Alpha Sinfonia existed at the school.

The school featured on postcards. The Detroit Historical Society has a collection of documents from the school. The Detroit Public Library has a photograph of a woman playing violin at the school.

== Alumni ==
Notable alumni include:

- Rachel Andresen
- Les Baxter
- Betty Carter
- Kenneth Louis Cox II
- Johnny Desmond
- Lucia Dlugoszewski
- Jean DuShon
- Dennis Edwards
- T. J. Fowler
- James Frazier (1940–1984)
- Antoinette Garnes
- Lou Hooper
- Boyd Marshall
- Sharon Elery Rogers
- Patricia Terry-Ross
- Elizebeth Thomas Werlein
- Thomas Whitfield (singer)
- Agnes Woodward
- Gaylord Yost (1904–1905)
