= Martha Broadus Anderson =

American musician

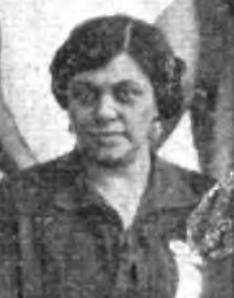
- Martha Broadus Anderson, from a 1925 publication
- Born: 1875; Richmond, Virginia, US
- Died: January 11, 1967 (aged 91); Oklahoma City, Oklahoma, US
- Other names: Martha B. Anderson-Winn, Martha B. Winn (after about 1927)
- Occupations: Musician, singer, music educator, choral director
- Known for: Vice-president, National Association of Negro Musicians (1925)

Martha Broadus Anderson (1875 – January 11, 1967), later Martha B. Anderson-Winn or Martha B. Winn, was an American singer based in Chicago, and vice-president of the National Association of Negro Musicians.

== Early life ==
Martha Broadus was born in Richmond, Virginia (some sources give Texas as her birthplace), and raised in Washington, D.C. She trained as a singer with John T. Layton in Washington, with Mabel C. Goodwin at the American Conservatory of Music, and at the Chicago College of Music, where she was the school's first Black graduate, earning a bachelor of music degree in 1908. She was a member of Zeta Phi Beta.

== Career ==
Anderson was a soprano singer and voice teacher based in Chicago, where she was a leader of the Choral Study Club, a soloist at Quinn Chapel, and gave musicales at her home on Champlain Avenue. She was a soloist with the Louisville Choral Society and the Fisk Glee Club in 1909, and in 1911, she made her own costume to sing the leading role in a cantata about Queen Esther. She sang with Emma Azalia Hackley and blind singer and pianist Mary Fitzhugh at the Ryman Auditorium in Nashville in 1913. In 1916 she conducted a 40-voice women's choir in a performance of Henry Smart's King Rene's Daughter, with Florence Cole Talbert among the soloists. She was choir director at Bethesda Baptist Church in Chicago. She was a co-founder of the Coleridge Taylor School of Music in Chicago.

Anderson wrote a column, "The Music Cabinet", for The Broad Ax weekly newspaper. In 1925, she was vice-president of the National Association of Negro Musicians. Margaret Bonds was one of her music students in Chicago. She managed singer Roland Hayes when he was a young performer.

After 1925, she lived and worked in Texas, where she served on the faculty of Manet Fowler's Mwalimu School in Fort Worth, Texas. and was head of the music department at Wiley College in Marshall, Texas. She performed with pianist Ernestine Jessie Covington Dent in 1928, in Fort Worth. In 1929, she (and Dent, Fowler, and Camille Nickerson) taught at a summer teachers' institute in Fort Worth, sponsored by the Texas Association of Negro Musicians. During this period she began using the name Martha B. Anderson-Winn.

As Martha B. Anderson-Winn or Martha B. Winn, she moved to Oklahoma City, where she continued to direct choirs in Black churches into the late 1940s, and remained active in Oklahoma City music into the 1960s.

== Personal life ==
Martha Broadus married railroad porter Henry S. Anderson in 1898. They had one child who died before 1910. She was widowed by 1920. She married again in Texas in the 1920s, to Rev. John Henry Winn, a Black Baptist minister; he died in 1955. Martha Broadus Anderson Winn died in 1967, aged 91 years, at a nursing home in Oklahoma City.
