= Willis Patterson =

American opera bass-baritone (1930–2025)

Willis Charles Patterson (November 27, 1930 – October 22, 2025) was an American bass-baritone, conductor, editor, music arranger and professor emeritus/Associate Dean of the University of Michigan School of Music, Theatre & Dance. A Fulbright Scholar and the winner of the Marian Anderson Award, he performed in opera houses and concert halls internationally. He served as president of the National Association of Negro Musicians and as executive secretary of the National Black Music Caucus. In 1977, he edited what The New York Times described as a "groundbreaking anthology of black art songs."

== Early life and education ==
Willis Charles Patterson was born in Ann Arbor, Michigan, on November 27, 1930. He was the son of Edward Curtis and Kathleen Gulley Patterson. He grew up in a poor family in the Northern part of Ann Arbor. His biological parents were not married, and he was raised by his mother and stepfather. His stepfather hauled coal for a living and struggled with alcoholism. He had nine siblings on the Patterson side of the family whom he lived with, in addition to 10 other siblings from his biological father. Willis attended Ann Arbor High School where he portrayed the Sergeant of Police in the school's Spring 1949 production of Gilbert and Sullivan's The Pirates of Penzance towards the end of his senior year. He enlisted in the United States Air Force after graduating in 1949, and was stationed in France as a senior stenographer in the Field Services Division during the early 1950s.

Patterson began his undergraduate education at Michigan State Normal College (MSNC, now Eastern Michigan University) where he was a pupil of Robert O. Hoffelt and sang in the MSNC Singers. He transferred to the University of Michigan (UM) where he graduated with a Bachelor of Music in 1958 and a Master of Music in 1959. He studied voice at UM with bass-baritone Chase Baromeo. A Fulbright Scholarship enabled him to pursue studies in opera and lieder in Germany for a year and a half studying at the Hochschule für Musik Freiburg with baritone Horst Günter. He also studied opera at the Manhattan School of Music (MSM) where he was a voice student of baritone John Brownlee. He portrayed Collatinus in the MSM's 1960 production of Benjamin Britten's The Rape of Lucretia which was conducted by Peter Paul Fuchs. He later pursued a doctoral degree at Wayne State University, earning a Ph.D. in Higher Education and Administrative Supervision in 1993.

== Career ==
=== Academic ===
Patterson began his teaching career at Southern University in Baton Rouge, Louisiana in 1959. In 1962 he joined the voice of faculty of Virginia State College (VSC) where he taught for the next six years.

Patterson left his post at VSC to join the faculty of the University of Michigan (UM) in 1968. He was the first African-American professor in the UM's School of Music, Theatre, and Dance. From 1969 until 1975, he was the music director of the University of Michigan Men's Glee Club. In 1976 he succeeded tenor John McCollum as chair of the voice faculty at UM. In 1979 he became Associate Dean for Undergraduate Studies and Minority Affairs in the School of Music, Theatre, and Dance. Berklee College of Music scholar William C. Banfield stated, "The real foundation layer for Black graduate recruitment and retention at the University of Michigan was Dr. Willis Patterson... He also is responsible for probably one of the most dynamic classes of Black music scholars and artists across at least two or three generations as he provided leadership as a voice professor, and then dean of the school for thirty plus years". He retired from UM in 1999. He was appointed a professor emeritus.

In 1977 Patterson was appointed executive secretary of the National Black Music Caucus. That same year he edited the seminal Anthology of Art Songs by Black American Composers, a work which the Encyclopedia of African American Music credited as making the music of African American composers "much more accessible". In 1985 he was main organizer of the Black American Music Symposium held on the campus of UM. From 1990-1995 he was president of the National Association of Negro Musicians.

One of his voice students at UM was soprano Ashley Putnam.

=== Singer, conductor, and music director ===
In 1958 Patterson won the Marian Anderson Award, and in 1961 he placed second in the finals of the National Association of Teachers of Singing contest at the national level of the competition. In 1961 he sang the role of the Old Hebrew in Samson and Delilah with the Detroit Symphony Orchestra (DSO) and conductor Paul Paray with Jean Madeira and Albert da Costa in the title parts. The following year he was heard again with the orchestra as the bass soloist in Paray's Agnus Dei with the composer conducting his final performances as leader of the DSO. In 1963 he portrayed King Balthazar in Amahl and the Night Visitors in a televised version of the opera broadcast on NBC-TV. He also recorded this opera role for RCA.

In 1967 Patterson performed the role of Sharpless in Madama Butterfly at the Dogwood Dell Amphitheater in Richmond for the city's Festival of Arts. That same year he was the bass soloist in Handel's Messiah with the Oratorio Society of New York at Carnegie Hall. In 1968 he was a soloist in music by Haydn with the Chamber Orchestra of Philadelphia at the Academy of Music, In 1969 he founded the Willis C. Patterson Our Own Thing Chorale. and performed the role of Colline in La bohème with the Musical Performing Arts Association in Flint, Michigan with Mary Beth Peil as Mimì and John Stewart as Rodolfo. That same year he was the bass soloist in Verdi's Requiem with the Boston Symphony Orchestra and the Lexington Choral Society at Symphony Hall. In 1974 he sang the role of Porgy in a concert version of Porgy and Bess with the Miami Beach Symphony.

On February 11, 1976, Patterson was the featured soloist in the world premieres of two songs for baritone and orchestra by composer Edgar Rogie Clark: "Kaffir Drinking Song" and "This Wicked Race" which he sang with the DSO under Paul Freeman. In 1977 he performed Howard Swanson's "The Negro Speaks of Rivers" and Dorothy Rudd Moore's "Weary Blues" in the New York Philharmonic's "Celebration of Black Composers" concert given at the New York Public Library for the Performing Arts. That same year he portrayed Jacquino in Fidelio with Opera/South Guild at Jackson State University. In 1978 he portrayed Sparafucile in Rigoletto with the Opera Association of Western Michigan.

Patterson conducted the Ambrosian Singers on Jessye Norman's 1979 album Spirituals. That same year he was the bass soloist in Beethoven's Symphony No. 9 with the Delaware Symphony Orchestra. He was the bass soloist and narrator in the world premiere of Undine Smith Moore's Scenes from the Life of a Martyr in 1982 by the Richmond Symphony. In 1985 he was appointed music director of The First Congregational Church of Ann Arbor. In 1998 he conducted the PBS television special "Holiday Homecomings" which featured Jessye Norman and the Augusta Opera.

== Personal life and death ==
On June 21, 1958, Patterson married Frankie Bouyer. They had four children together. Patterson died on October 22, 2025, at the age of 94.

== Selected publications and recordings ==
- Anthology of Art Songs by Black American Composers. New York: Edward B. Marks Music Company. 1977. ISBN 9780793508716. OCLC 4416705 – via Internet Archive.
- The New Negro Spiritual Collection (2002) OCLC 51238724
- The Unlikely Saga of a Singer from Ann Arbor (2015) OCLC 940824661
- Art Songs by Black American Composers (1981) OCLC 49870716
- The Second Anthology of Art Songs by African American Composers (2002) OCLC 806491244
- Spirituals (1991) OCLC 466378527
- Amazing Grace (1991) OCLC 1088682872
