= Audrey Boswell Jones =

American social worker (1909-2001)

- Audrey Boswell Jones, from a 1944 publication
- Born: Audrey L. Boswell; June 29, 1909; Dallas, Texas, U.S.
- Died: October 14, 2001 (aged 92); Los Angeles, California, U.S.
- Other names: Audrey Boswell Bradshaw; Audrey Bradshaw Jones
- Occupations: Social worker, lawyer, clubwoman
- Spouse(s): 1) Ronald Malcolm Bradshaw; 2) Winfield Jones
- Children: 1

Audrey Boswell Jones (née Boswell; formerly Bradshaw; June 29, 1909 – October 14, 2001) was an American social worker and lawyer. She was president (basileus) of the Los Angeles chapter of Alpha Kappa Alpha (AKA), and western regional director of the sorority, in the 1940s.

== Early life and education ==
Jones was born in Dallas, Texas, the daughter of George Boswell and Alice Ellis Boswell. Her brother, Alger Vernon Boswell, was vice-president of Tennessee State University. San Francisco-based pastor and activist Hamilton T. Boswell was one of her cousins. She graduated from Tennessee State University in 1932, earned a master's degree in social work from the University of Southern California, and earned a law degree at Southwestern University in Texas.

== Career ==
Jones was a social worker in Los Angeles County from 1937 to 1949. She was president of the Los Angeles County social workers union. From 1954 to 1957, she was a welfare agent for the Salvation Army and was admitted the bar in California in 1958. She had a private law practice and worked as an examiner with the Los Angeles Police Commission. She was appointed to the New Car Dealers Policy and Appeals Board in 1968, and reappointed in 1973.

Jones was active in Alpha Kappa Alpha activities in Los Angeles. She was president of the Los Angeles alumnae chapter from 1945 to 1946, succeeding Naida McCullough, and Far West Regional Director of AKA from 1946 to 1950. In 1948, she represented AKA at the United States National Commission for UNESCO's annual conference in San Francisco.

In 1958, Jones was named a director of the Frederick Douglass Civic League. Jones was president of the Twelve Big Sisters, an interracial charitable organization focused on addressing the needs of "delinquent girls". In 1972, Jones and Zella Taylor were honored for their work with the Faustina Home for Girls Program, with an event at the Los Angeles Convention Center.

== Personal life ==
Boswell married twice. Her first husband was Ronald Malcolm Bradshaw; they had a son Roland. Her second husband was Winfield Jones; they married in 1944. She died in 2001, at the age of 92, in Los Angeles. The AKA chapter in Marina del Rey, California has an Audrey B. Jones Award, named in her memory. There's also an Audrey B. Jones and Ronald Boswell Bradshaw scholarship offered by Tennessee State University.
