= Gaylord Yost =

American musician

Dr. Gaylord Yost (28 January 1888 – 10 October 1958) was a violinist, composer, and teacher. He is best known today for his collections of method books for the violin.

== Biography ==
Gaylord Purcell Yost was born on January 28, 1888, in Fayette, Ohio. He was the only child of Charles E. Yost, the proprietor and a journalist of The Fayette Review (the only newspaper in the village at the time) and Ada Purcell, daughter of Lott. A Purcell, a well-known figure in Fayette. He started playing violin in elementary school, and by age 12, he began composing violin and piano duets. By age 15, he was the leading violin teacher in the area. In 1903, he went to further his studies at the Toledo Conservatory. He remained there through 1904, then in 1905 went to the Detroit Conservatory, where he remained until 1906. After leaving Detroit, he went to Berlin to study with renowned Russian virtuoso Issay Barmas. He moved to Indianapolis around 1907 and between 1907 and 1911 he toured as a concert artist across the United States, Europe, and South America.

He began teaching at the collegiate level in 1911, as head of the violin department of the Indiana Conservatory of Music. He started teaching at Indiana University as head of the violin department in 1915, and also taught at the Indiana College of Music and Fine Arts around this time. In 1919, he moved to Pittsburgh and shortly thereafter became head of the violin department at Pittsburgh Musical Institute, a position he held for 25 years. While in Pittsburgh, he conducted the Pittsburgh Symphony and formed the Yost String Quartet. He served as the first violinist, with Roy Shoemaker, a former Pittsburgh Symphony musician and string department chair at PMI, as second violinist, Carl Rosenberg as violist, and James Younger as cellist.

In 1909, he married Ella Caroline Schroeder, another violinist from Detroit. Later, in 1917, he remarried to Ruth Margaret Stuernagel, with whom he had two children: Gaylord C. Yost and Sondra Yost Matter.

In 1936, he earned the Doctorate of Music degree from Waynesburg College as well as an honorary membership in the Institut Litteraire et Artistique de France.

In 1950, his father died. This prompted Yost to move back to Fayette in 1951 and take over his father's old newspaper. From 1954 to 1957 he served as the mayor of Fayette. He died in Fayette on October 10, 1958, at the age of 70.

== Works ==
Yost authored numerous short compositions for violin and piano through his career. One of his pieces, "Ecolouge", won the Institut Litteraire et Artistique de France's first prize in 1939. The International Who's Who in Music and Musical Gazetteer, published in 1918, has a short list of his compositions, and also notes that they were performed by Albert Spalding, Efrem Zimbalist, Arthur Hartmann, Kathleen Parlow, Maud Powell, and Louis Persinger, among others.

Yost may be more widely known for his Yost Violin System, a myriad of method books for the violin, which focus on building basic technique to solidify one's playing. Who's Who in America asserted he had made "revolutionary discoveries" with his publication of the Yost System. Some of his books include:

- Studies in Pizzicato and Harmonics
- Exercises for Change of Position
- Scale and Arpeggio Studies
- Key to the Mastery of the Finger Board
- Key to the Mastery of Bowing
- Bow and Finger Magic
- Spivakovsky Way of Bowing
- Key to the Mastery of Double-Stopping
- Studies in Finger Action and Position Playing

Many of his method books are considered indispensable in violin technique.

== See also ==
- http://digital.lib.uiowa.edu/cdm/ref/collection/tc/id/27540
