= Ralph Cato =

American baritone singer

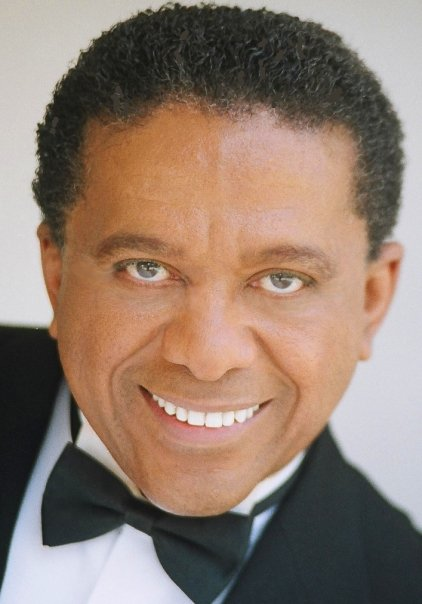

Background information
- Born: New Orleans, Louisiana, United States
- Genres: Opera, oratorio, musical theatre
- Occupation: Baritone singer

Ralph Cato is an American baritone singer. Cato has performed many styles of music including opera, oratorio, jazz, and musical theatre. Cato has performed on many stages globally, and in the United States, and is known to be a versatile and collaborative artist.

== Career ==
Cato is a former member of the cast of Riverdance and the Albert McNeil Jubilee Singers. He has been music director for churches in the Los Angeles, California area and teaches vocal studies at the University of California, Riverside and Los Angeles Pierce College. Cato has performed with the Cologne Philharmonic, Germany, the Estonia National Symphony, Chicago Sinfonietta, Pacific Symphony, Long Beach Symphony, Stockton Symphony, San Bernardino Symphony, The United States Marine Band, Symphony Silicon Valley, and others. He has performed at the Montreux Jazz Festival (Switzerland) and the Playboy Jazz Festival (Hollywood). His operatic roles include Amonasro in Aida, Scarpia in Tosca, Tonio in Pagliacci, Germont in La Traviata, Figaro in the Barber of Seville and many others.

=== Reception ===
The Daily Breeze described his musical theatre program with the Torrance Symphony as "warm" and "mellow". In 2014, he performed with Symphony Silicon Valley, performing an oratorio of Carmina Burana. Mercury News writer Richard Scheinin acknowledged Cato as being "charismatic" and having a "warmly rounded voice".

== Personal life ==
Cato was born and grew up in New Orleans, Louisiana. After graduating from Walter Louis Cohen High School, he moved to Los Angeles to study music. In LA, he earned a Bachelor of Music degree from California State University, Northridge, and a Master of Music degree from the University of Southern California. In 1994, he moved to New York, and after several years of traveling and performing abroad, Ralph returned to Los Angeles where he was given the opportunity to teach voice at UCLA while pursuing his doctoral studies. He received his Doctor of Musical Arts degree, from the University of California, Los Angeles in 2005. Dr. Cato is currently a resident of Los Angeles, and is on the faculty of the Music Department at the University of California, Riverside and Los Angeles Pierce College
