= Cleota Collins =

American singer (1893–1976)

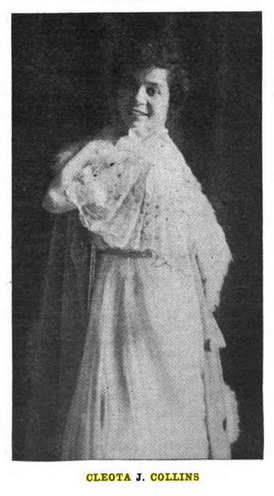
Cleota J. Collins, from a 1919 publication.

Cleota Josephine Collins (September 24, 1893 — July 7, 1976) was an American soprano singer and music educator. She was one of the founding members of the National Association of Negro Musicians in 1919.

== Early life ==
Cleota Josephine Collins was born in Cleveland, Ohio, the daughter of Ira A. Collins and Josie Collins. Her father was a clergyman. Cleota Collins studied music at Ohio State University in Columbus, Ohio, and abroad in France and Italy, as the student of Emma Azalia Hackley, with further studies in New York.

== Career ==
Cleota Collins "toured extensively". In 1924 she gave educational recitals at schools in Tennessee, Arkansas, Texas, Florida, North Carolina and South Carolina. She toured southern schools again in 1936 and in 1938. She taught voice and piano at Florida Baptist Academy, Sam Houston College, Tuskegee Institute, and Virginia State College in Petersburg, among other posts. She was one of the founding members of the National Association of Negro Musicians in 1919. She operated the Lacy School of Music and was a church music director in Cleveland in the 1930s.

In 1932, sculptor Henry Bannarn created a portrait bust of Cleota Collins; it was his earliest known work.

== Personal life ==
Cleota Collins married George Corinth Lacy, a lawyer, in 1917. She married William Johnson Trent Sr., the president of Livingstone College, as his fourth wife, in 1953. She may have married a third time, as her grave marker is for "Cleota Collins Moore." She died in 1976, aged 83 years, in Pasadena, California. Her gravesite is in Angelus-Rosedale Cemetery.
