= Philip D. Uzee =

American economist

Philip Davis Uzee
- Born: November 5, 1914
- Died: April 1, 2010 (aged 95)
- Occupations: Professor, Dean, University Archivist, Author
- Years active: 1953–1984
- Spouse: Yvonne Toups
- Children: David (son), Denise (daughter)
- Awards: Inducted into the Tri-Parish Hall of Fame (2006)

Academic work
- Institutions: Nicholls State University

Philip Davis Uzee (November 5, 1914 - April 1, 2010) was a professor, dean, university archivist, and author in the United States. He was a professor of economics and history at Nicholls State University from 1953 to the 1970s when he became the university's archivst until his retirement in 1984.

He served as an officer in the U.S. Army during World War II.

He served as president of the Louisiana Historical Association in 1970 and in 1992 was elected a fellow. He married Yvonne Toups and they had a son David of Dallas; a daughter Denise of Baton Rouge and a daughter-in-law Trina as well as grandchildren. He was inducted into the Tri-Parish Hall of Fame in 2006.

== Bibliography ==
- "The first Louisiana state constitution : a study of its origin", Master's dissertation (1938)
- "Republican politics in Louisiana, 1877-1900", Ph.D. dissertation, Louisiana State University, Baton Rouge (1950)
- "Midwestern attitudes on the "Kansas Fever"", historical society article
- Records and recollections of Thibodaux, Louisiana with William Littlejohn Martin, Woman's Club of Thibodaux (1972)
- Thibodaux Chronicles : a sesquicentennial history, a selection of Uzee's columns from the Thibodaux Daily Comet (1987)
- The Lafourche country : the people and the land, Center for Louisiana Studies, University of Southwestern Louisiana, genealogy (1985)
