= Albert McNeil Jubilee Singers =

American choral music ensemble

- Origin: Los Angeles, California, United States
- Genres: Spirituals
- Years active: 1968–present
- Past members: Ralph Cato
- Website: www.amjsla.org

The Albert McNeil Jubilee Singers is a choral music ensemble based in Los Angeles, California. It was founded in 1968 by American choral conductor Albert J. McNeil, whose objective was to cultivate global attention on the rich genre of African-American music known as Negro spirituals. The ensemble is composed of a resident group of 29 and a touring company of 12.

It has toured widely in the United States, and also internationally, having played in the Concertgebouw in Amsterdam, the Accademia Nazionale di Santa Cecilia in Rome, the Mozarteum concert hall in Salzburg, and also other world capitals.
