= Sharon Elery Rogers =

American composer, educator, and organist (1929–2022)

Sharon Elery Rogers (4 March 1929 – 3 May 2022) was an American composer, music educator, and organist who published over 550 compositions of sacred music.

Rogers was born in Grosse Pointe, Michigan, to Lea and Leo Elery. She married Walter Rogers and they had one daughter.

Rogers began studying piano at the Detroit Conservatory of Music. She earned a BA at Hillsdale College, where she received the Mattie King Bailey Music Scholarship. She attended graduate school at Wayne State University.

Rogers taught public school music and served as the Supervisor of Music in three Detroit school systems. She was the organist and choir director at Zion Lutheran Church and other churches in Detroit, and later in Florida (Sarasota and Venice). She sang and arranged music for the Don Large Chorus, the Lutheran Charities Hour, and the Wayne King Chorus.

Rogers belonged to the American Society of Composers, Authors, and Publishers (ASCAP), the Cecilian Music Society, the National Federation of Music Clubs and Sigma Alpha Iota. She received 46 special awards from ASCAP; first prize in the 1993 American Guild of English Handbell Ringers composer's contest; an Honorary Alumni Achievement Award from Hillsdale College; and an Honorary Life Membership in the American Guild of Organists (Detroit chapter). In 1999, the Jeffers Handbell Supply Publishing Company named her Composer of the Year.

Rogers' sacred music for brass, choir, handbells, organ and piano has been widely published by Alfred Music, Bourne Company Music Publishers, Chorister's Guild Publishers, Flammer-Shawnee (today the Hal Leonard Corporation), Hope Publishing Company, Lorenz Publishing Company (today the Lorenz Corporation) and Sacred Music Press.
