= Uzee Brown Jr. =

American singer

Uzee Brown Jr. (born 1950) is an American singer, performer, composer, arranger, educator, and choir director from Cowpens, South Carolina. Brown has graduated from Berkshire Music Center, Tanglewood and the University of Siena in Italy, he holds degrees from Morehouse College (B.A.), Bowling Green State University (M.M. in Composition), and University of Michigan (M.M. and D.M.A. in performance).

== Biography ==
As a composer and arranger Brown has worked in theater. Spike Lee's "School daze" musical prologue, "I'm Building Me a Home," was written by Brown in the late 1970s but was recorded for the soundtrack in 1987 by the Morehouse Glee Club when the choir was on tour. He has been nominated for the AUDELCO award in black theater as outstanding musical director and arranger for his work in an off-Broadway musical play called ZION.

Outside of theater, Brown has been president of the National Association of Negro Musicians. While being president, he was featured in the first official publication of the documentary history of the National Association of Negro Musicians by the Center for Black Music Research in Chicago, Illinois. He was the Director of the historic Ebenezer Baptist Church Choir for twelve years, and has led the choir on tours in Germany, Switzerland and France in 2002 and Italy in 2004.

For over thirty years, Brown has been an educator on African-American music focusing on Spirituals. Brown is former chair of the Department of Music at Clark Atlanta University, President of the National Association of Negro Musicians and co-founder and chairman of the Board of Directors of Onyx Opera Atlanta. He was elected to the board of trustees at Morehouse College. Brown is currently Professor of Music at Morehouse College where he is Chair of the Creative and Performing Arts Division,

His arrangements and compositions are published with Lawson-Gould Publishing Company of New York and Roger Dean Publishing Company. In 2006, he released the CD, Great day, that consisted of solo spiritual arrangements.

== Works ==
- Treemonisha, Atlanta Symphony Orchestra, 1972.
- King Solomon, Emory Theater Productions, 1988.
- Jubilee, Alliance Theater, National Black Arts Festival, 1994.
- The Negro Speaks of Rivers, A Death Song, Performance Today, January 15, 1999.
- Zabette, Georgia State University, 1999.

== Compositions and arrangements ==
- (Composer) Musical prologue, School Daze, 1988.
- (Composer) O Redeemed! A Set of African-American Spirituals, for Medium-High Voice, R. Dean Publishing, 1994.
- ,(Composer) Zion (musical play), Theater in the Square, Atlanta, GA, 1996.
- (Arranger) “We Shall Overcome,” Atlanta Symphony Orchestra, 1999.
- (Arranger) “Go Where I Send Thee,” GIA Publications.
- (Arranger) “Rock-a My Soul,” GIA Publications.
- (Composer) “Be With Us All, Lord.”
- (Arranger) “Come By Here.”
- (Composer) “Dide Ta Deo.”
- (Arranger) “I’m Building Me a Home.”
- (Arranger) “John Was A Writer.”
- (Composer) “Oh The Savior’s Comin’ Hallelu.”
- (Arranger) “Sweep Clean Mary.”
- (Composer) “Wake Me Up Lord.”
- (Composer) “Zungo.”
- (Composer) “This River.”
- “My God Is So High.”
- “Gonna Walk All Over God’s Heaven.”
- “Keep Your Lamps Trimmed and Burning.”
- "Yes, Lord.”
- “Ain’t-a That Good News!”
