= Carl Rossini Diton =

American pianist and composer

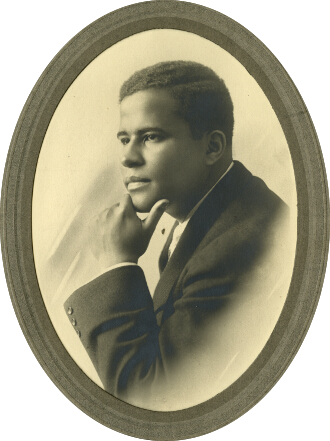
- Born: October 30, 1886
- Died: January 25, 1962 (aged 75)
- Education: University of Pennsylvania, Juilliard
- Known for: Symphony in C Minor

Carl Rossini Diton (October 30, 1886 – January 25, 1962) was a pianist and composer. He was born in Philadelphia, Pennsylvania, and graduated from the University of Pennsylvania and received a diploma from Juilliard. He traveled extensively as a concert pianist and was said to have been the first black pianist to make a transcontinental tour in 1909.

Diton worked with traditional spirituals and performed them in concert styles and for solo organ performances. He worked as a church organist at St. Thomas's African Episcopal Church in Philadelphia, offered private lessons, and was the assistant to the head of the symphonic orchestration department at Juilliard for nine years.

Diton was a charter member of the National Association of Negro Musicians and served as its president from 1926 through 1928. He won a Harmon Award for music in 1929.

== Personal life ==
Diton was born in Philadelphia to Phebe Harvey Diton and Samuel James Diton. He was raised primarily by his aunts Emma and Josey Harvey. Diton was friends in childhood with Yolande Du Bois and maintained a correspondence with W. E. B. Du Bois throughout his adult life.
