= Brazeal Dennard =

- Born: January 1, 1929; Detroit, Michigan, U.S.
- Died: July 5, 2010 (aged 81) Detroit, Michigan, U.S.
- Occupation(s): Singer, teacher, choral director, arranger

Brazeal Dennard (January 1, 1929 – July 5, 2010) was an American singer, educator, choral director, and musical arranger. He has been a significant contributor in the preservation and revitalization of the spiritual musical form. His efforts helped moved the African-American spiritual beyond the confines of the church, exposing not only the beauty of this music, but also its historical importance to a wider audience.

== Biography ==
Born in Detroit just prior to the Great Depression, Dennard acquired an early love of music and began playing piano at age 11. He attended Detroit Public Schools and Wayne State University, where he received a Master of Arts degree in music education. While in the United States Army, he organized a choral group of enlisted men and their wives. While a teacher in the Detroit Public schools, Dennard held the position of Fine Arts Department Head at Northwestern High School and Director of Music Education. He retired from this position in 1989. Dennard died in 2010, at the age of 81, in Detroit.

Throughout his career, Dennard served in many roles, including guest conductor, clinician, lecturer, and church choirmaster. His numerous professional affiliations included the National Endowment of the Arts, Department of Cultural Affairs for the city of Detroit, trustee and member of the Advisory Committee of the Detroit Community Music School, Chairman of the Music Advisory Committee for the Michigan Council for the Arts, president of the National Association of Negro Musicians, member of the board of directors of the Detroit Symphony Orchestra, and Adjunct Faculty member at Wayne State University.

In 1972 he founded the Brazeal Dennard Chorale. In keeping with his lifelong interest in education, the Chorale sponsors two other choral groups, The Brazeal Dennard Community Chorus, organized in 1985 as a community outreach program to encourage participation of members of the surrounding communities and to provide them with vocal training and professional performance opportunities, and The Brazeal Dennard Youth Chorale, for singers between the ages of 13 and 22.

== Discography ==
Recordings of the Brazeal Dennard Chorale include:

- Remembering, Discovering, Preserving
- Hush
- In Silent Night
- Bridging Generations
- Remembering II: Significant Spirituals
