= Naida McCullough =

American educator, pianist, and composer (c. 1901–1989)

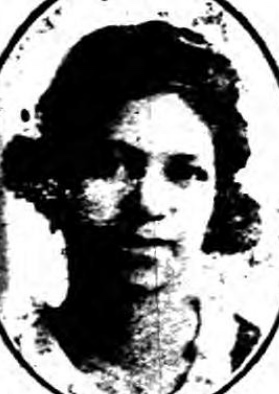
- Naida McCullough, from a 1928 newspaper
- Born: Naida Portia McCullough c. 1901; Colorado
- Died: September 19, 1989; California
- Other name: Naida McCullough Banks
- Occupations: Pianist, activist
- Years active: 1920s–1950s

Naida Portia McCullough (c. 1901 – September 19, 1989) was an American educator, pianist, and composer based in Los Angeles.

== Early life ==
Naida McCullough was born in Colorado, the younger daughter of George A. McCullough and Georgia A. McCullough. She was raised in Denver, where she began as a performer and learned to play the church organ, and graduated from Los Angeles High School in the winter class of 1917.

She and her elder sister, Yolande McCullough (1898–1964), taught music classes together as young women. Yolande married Leonard Stovall, a doctor in World War I who worked on tuberculosis prevention after the war.

== College activities ==
McCullough was described in 1921 as "the first colored girl to graduate from the music department of the University of Southern California". She was the first African American woman to receive a Pi Kappa Lambda Key (Music). McCullough was a founding member of the Alpha Kappa Alpha sorority chapter at USC, and she helped to found the chapter at UCLA in 1925, and was a founding member of the west coast graduate chapter, in 1927.

She was president of the Los Angeles graduate chapter in the 1940s, succeeded by Audrey Boswell Jones in 1945. She performed at the national gatherings of the sorority in Philadelphia in 1925, and in 1932 in Los Angeles.

As a student, McCullough was also active in the Junior Branch of the NAACP's Los Angeles chapter. As a leader of that organization in 1925, she worked on a production of W. E. B. Du Bois's pageant, The Star of Ethiopia at the Hollywood Bowl, then led a boycott of the same production, when it was taken over by more established theatre professionals.

== Career ==
McCullough played gave concerts, including her own compositions in the program of piano music. "Genius is the only fitting description of this remarkably talented young woman", according to a 1936 report, remarking especially on her own works, "Hawaiian Rain Shower" and "E Flat Sonata", and her rendition of Samuel Coleridge-Taylor's "I'm Troubled in Mind". She joined the Los Angeles Musicians Association in 1931. She accompanied singers Florence Cole Talbert and Lillian Evanti. In 1937 she visited Hawaii to give performances and study at the University of Hawaii.

In 1940, she and singer Tomiko Kanazawa gave a concert together at the Wilshire Ebell Theatre, to benefit a tuberculosis rest home in Duarte, California.

McCullough also taught kindergarten in Los Angeles, and worked with principal Bessie Burke at the Holmes Avenue School. She sometimes gave lectures on Hawaii to community groups, after her studies there. Because she was a member of the board of the Musicians' Congress, her name came up in a state Senate report on "un-American activities in California".

== Personal life ==
Naida P. McCullough eloped with realtor Fitzhugh L. Banks in January 1940; they divorced a few months later. Naida McCullough died in 1989, believed to be aged 88 years.
