= Edward Boatner =

American composer

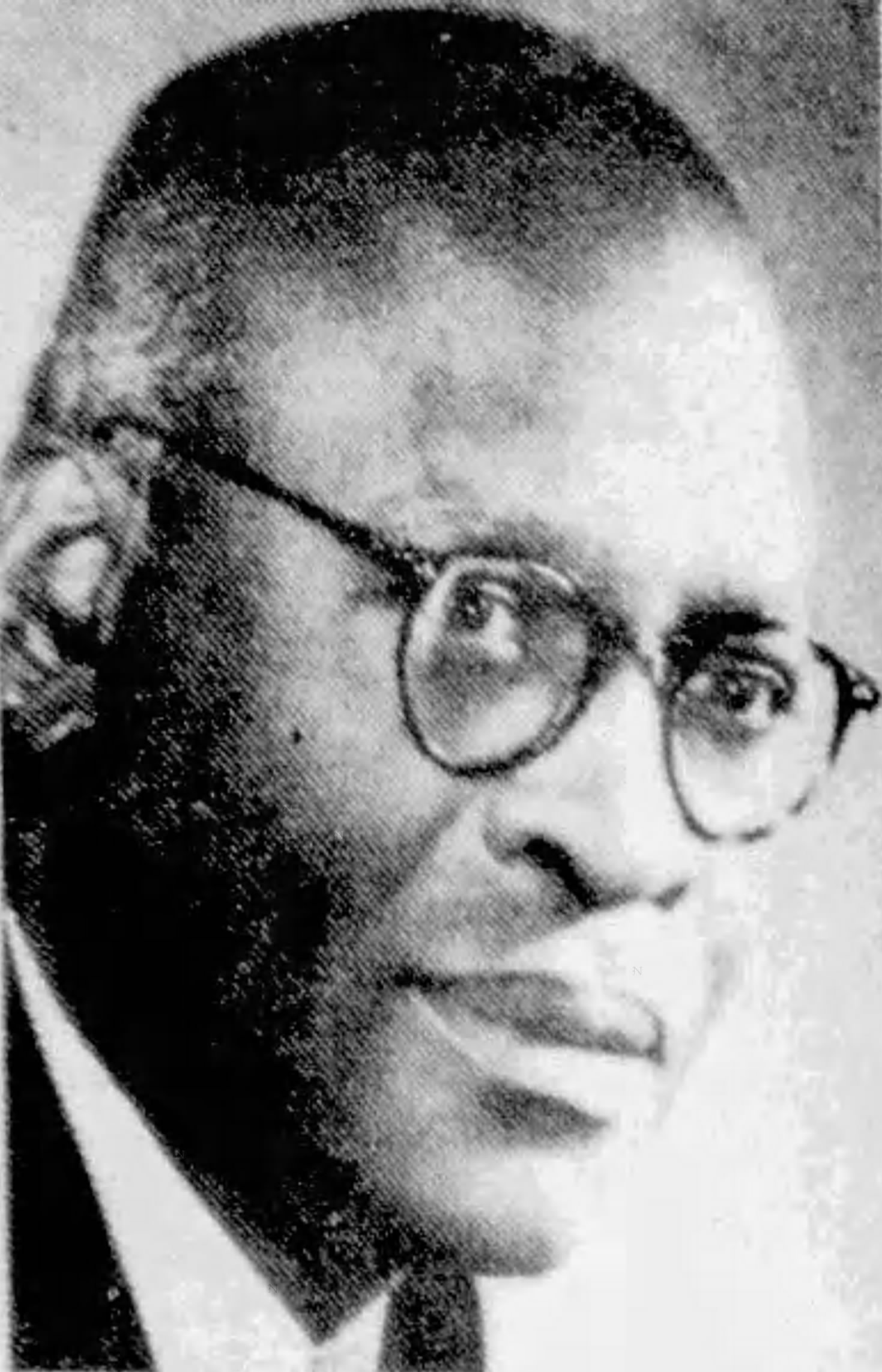
- Boatner c. 1977
- Born: 13 November 1898 New Orleans, Louisiana, U. S.
- Died: 16 June 1981 (aged 82) New York City, New York, U. S.
- Occupation: Composer

Edward Hammond Boatner (13 November 1898–16 June 1981) was an American composer who wrote many popular concert arrangements of Black American spirituals.

== Biography ==
Boatner was educated at Western University in Quindaro, Kansas, Boston Conservatory and received a Bachelor of Music from the Chicago Music College (Now the College of Performing Arts at Roosevelt University). He also studied music privately. He began as a Concert singer with the encouragement and assistance of Roland Hayes — who performed many of Boatner's works on his concert programs—and choral director R. Nathaniel Dett. He also sang leading roles with the National Negro Opera Company. For the National Baptist Convention, he served as the director of music from 1925 to 1931. Boatner was a professor for Samuel Huston College (now Huston–Tillotson University) and Wiley College in Marshall, TX. He then settled in New York conducting a studio and directed community and church choirs. This allowed him to concentrate more on composing.

Boatner was the natural father of the sax player Sonny Stitt, but the boy - named Edward Boatner, Jr. - was placed for adoption early on to the Stitt family, growing up in Saginaw, Michigan.

== Music ==
=== Notable arrangements ===
- "Oh, What a Beautiful City"
- "Let Us Break Bread Together"
- "Soon I Will Be Done"
- "Trampling"
- "I want Jesus to walk with me", for Marian Anderson

=== Notable compositions ===
- "Freedom Suite" for chorus, narrator, and orchestra
- "The Man from Nazareth", a "spiritual musical"
- "Julius Sees Her", a musical comedy
