= A Trip to Tuskegee =

- Directed by: George Broome
- Release date: 1909
- Country: United States
- Language: English

A Trip to Tuskegee is a 1909 film made to promote the Tuskegee Institute. The film depicted the transformative positive influence of a Hampton education.

Filmmaker George Broome helmed the project. The film was shown at theaters and churches to African American audiences. Segregation was in force. It is one of the earliest African American film projects. The film was followed by A Day At Tuskegee in 1913.

The film, or a version of it, was still distributed as of 1922. This was an unusually long period compared to comparable films.

== Production company ==
Anderson-Watkins Film Company was an American film company. It produced a 1913 film for the Tuskegee Institute.

The film company was a partnership between Louis B. Anderson and William F. Watkins.
