= National Association of Negro Musicians =

Cultural organization in the United States

National Association of Negro Musicians, Inc.
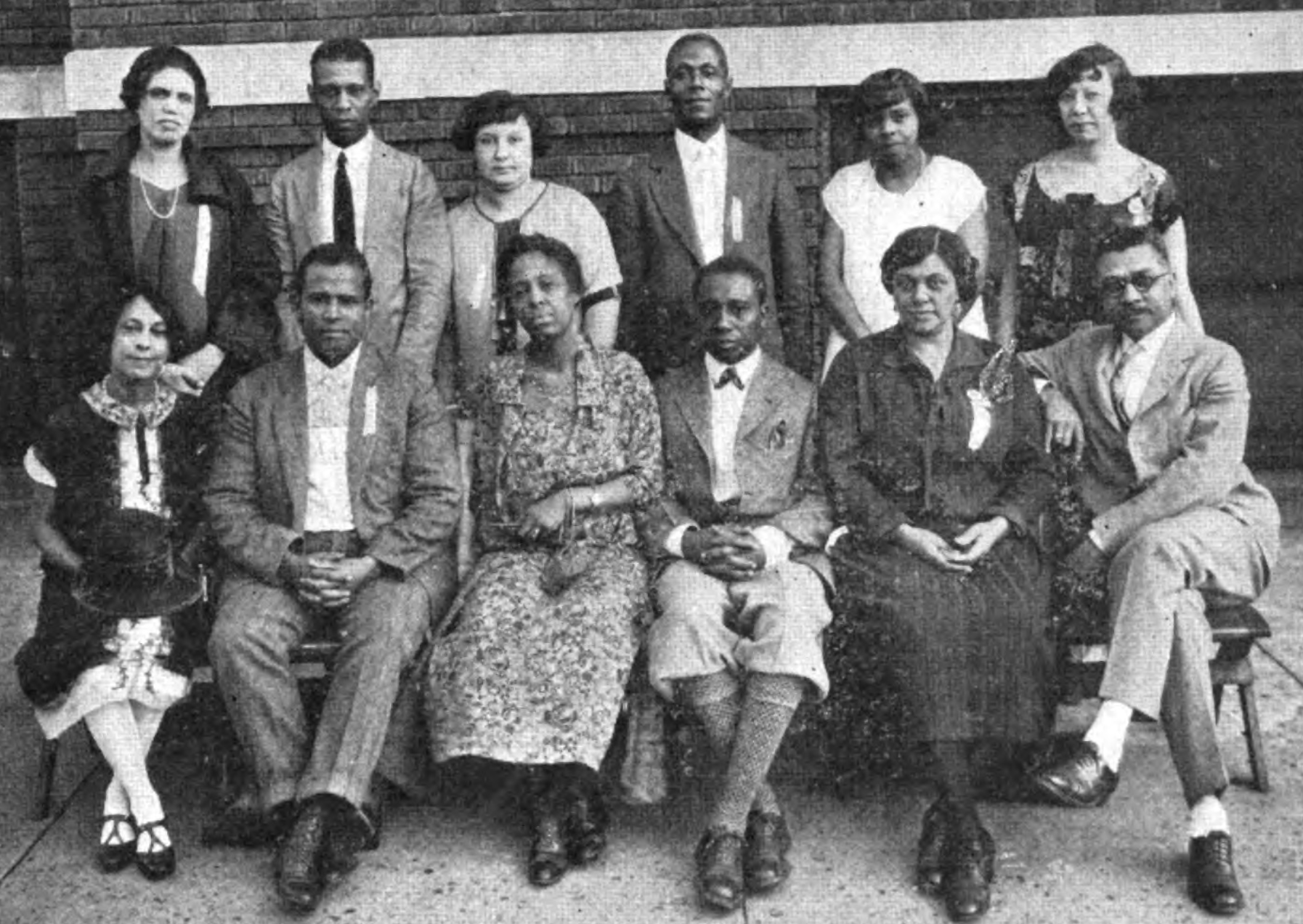
- The newly-elected officers of the National Association of Negro Musicians in 1925; standing, from left, Camille Nickerson, Henry Grant, Lillian Lemon, J. Wesley Jones, Lillian Carpenter, Adelaide Herriot; seated, from left, Mildred Bryant Jones, Carl Rossini Diton, Alice Carter Simmons, Robert Nathaniel Dett, Martha Broadus Anderson, and Clarence Cameron White.
- Formation: 1919; 107 years ago
- Website: Official website

The National Association of Negro Musicians, Inc. is one of the oldest organizations in the United States dedicated to the preservation, encouragement, and advocacy of all genres of the music of African-Americans. NANM had its beginning on May 3, 1919 in Washington, D.C. at a temporary initial conference of “Negro” musicians under the leadership of Henry Grant and Nora Holt. In concert with the Chicago Music Association, its first national convention was held in Chicago, Illinois in the same year. The organization is dedicated to encouraging an inclusive musical culture throughout the country. Within NANM, members lend their support and influence—educators and professional musicians share their musical knowledge, amateurs and enthusiasts grow in their musical enjoyment, and people of all ages come together to share and participate in the musical experience.

Since its inception, NANM has provided encouragement and support to thousands of African American musicians, many of whom have become widely respected figures in music and have contributed significantly to American culture and music history. The organization has awarded scholarships to scores of talented young musicians throughout the country, including Marian Anderson (the first scholarship award recipient in 1919), William L. Dawson, Florence Price, Margaret Bonds, Warren George Wilson, James Frazier, Julia Perry, Grace Bumbry, Leon Bates, Joseph Joubert and Awadagin Pratt.

Over the years, many international personalities have been presented in performance, including Lena Horne, Todd Duncan, John W. Work, R. Nathaniel Dett, Marian Anderson, Edward Boatner, Camille Nickerson, Clarence Cameron White, Margaret Bonds, Florence B. Price, Etta Moten, Betty Allen, Natalie Hinderas, Adele Addison, Kermit Moore, Simon Estes, George Shirley, Robert McFerrin, Shirley Verrett, Jessye Norman, Carl Rossini Diton, Sanford Allen, Derek Lee Ragin, the Uptown String Quartet, Esther Hinds, Ruby Hinds, Wilhelmenia Fernandez, the Hinds Sisters, William Warfield, Benjamin Matthews, the Albert McNeil Jubilee Singers, Harolyn Blackwell, Billy Taylor, Delphin & Romain, Greg Hopkins, Martina Arroyo, and Nina Simone (Eunice Waymon).

Clinicians and lecturers of note include Carl Diton, Warner Lawson, Frederick Hall, Kemper Harreld, Wendell Whalum, Eileen Southern, Doris Evans McGinty, Alain Locke, Grace Bumbry, Sylvia Olden Lee, James Cleveland, Raoul Abdul, Matthew Kennedy, Geneva Handy Southall, Sowah Mensah, Willis Patterson, Roland Carter, Brazeal Dennard, Robert Harris, and Shirley Verrett.

There are several regional chapters of the national organization. NANM hosts a national convention annually in various cities.

== Presidents of the National Association of Negro Musicians ==
- Henry Grant (1919-1922)
- Clarence Cameron White (1922-1924)
- Robert Nathaniel Dett (1924-1926)
- Carl Rossini Diton (1916-1928)
- John Wesley Jones (1926-1930)
- Lillian Lemon (1930-1933)
- Maude Roberts George (1933-1935)
- Camille Nickerson (1935-1938)
- Kemper Harreld (1938-1940)
- Mary Cardwell Dawson (1940-1942)
- Clarence H. Wilson (1942-1952, 1965-1968)
- Roscoe Polin (1952-1960)
- Clarence Billups (1960-1965)
- Theodore Charles Stone (1968-1975)
- Brazeal Dennard (1975-1980)
- Betty Jackson King (1980-1985)
- William Warfield (1985-1990)
- Willis Patterson (1990-1995)
- Uzee Brown Jr. (1995-2002)
- Roland Carter (2002-2008)
- David Morrow (2008-2014)
- Byron Smith (2014-2019)
- Anne-Marie Hudley Simmons (2019-present)

== Mission statement ==
NANM promotes, preserves, and supports all genres of music created or performed by African-Americans.

== Purposes ==
- The promotion of the music and the development of knowledge and appreciation of music composed by all persons, but especially those of African descent.
- The establishment of a library where Afro-American historical information concerning composers, artists, and musicians who have contributed to the cultural and fine arts of Black people can be gathered for compilation and publication.
- To afford a central location for the gathering and/or purchase of library collections of sheet music, compositions, and original documents from which out-of-print works may be compiled for historic use; to conduct research on the works of composers and artists of African descent and to publish or copyright the results of such research.
- To establish a scholarship and grant on national, regional, and local levels to assist talented youth in the field of musical and/or cultural arts in education.
- To foster a broader understanding of the contributions of persons of African descent in all fields of music and in the cultural arts.
