= Camille Nickerson =

American pianist and composer

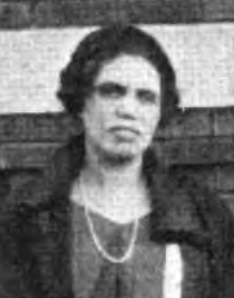
- Nickerson from a 1925 issue of The Crisis
- Born: March 30, 1888; New Orleans, Louisiana, U.S.
- Died: April 27, 1982 (aged 94); Washington, D.C.
- Other names: "The Louisiana Lady"
- Occupations: Musician, composer, folklorist, college professor

Camille Lucie Nickerson (March 30, 1888 – April 27, 1982) was an American pianist, composer, arranger, collector, and Howard University professor from 1926 to 1962. She was influenced by Creole folksongs of Louisiana, which she arranged and sang.

== Early life and education ==
Nickerson was born in the French Quarter of New Orleans, the daughter of music professor and band director William Joseph Nickerson and his first wife, Aurelie Duconge. She was a member of her father's musical ensemble, the Nickerson Ladies’ Orchestra, from an early age. She earned a bachelor's degree in 1916 and a master's degree in 1932 at the Oberlin Conservatory of Music. She continued her studies with support from a Rosenwald Fellowship. Her master's thesis at Oberlin was titled "Afro-Creole Music in Louisiana: A Thesis on the Plantation Songs Created by the Creole Negroes of Louisiana."

She made further studies on a sabbatical in 1939 and 1940, at Columbia University and the Juilliard School.

== Career ==
Nickerson taught at her father's school in New Orleans as a young woman, and played organ and piano recitals in Black churches.

In 1917, Nickerson founded the B-Sharp Music Club, an organization which gave monthly concerts featuring Western art music, spirituals, and Afro-Creole music. The organization also raised money for the NAACP. In 1921, this group established the New Orleans chapter of the National Association of Negro Musicians (NANM). Nickerson would go on to hold the offices of Secretary, Vice President and ultimately, in 1944, President of NANM.

In 1926, Nickerson accepted an invitation to serve as professor of music at Howard University, where she taught piano, pipe organ, and methods of teaching. She retired in 1962. As a music scholar, she researched folksongs and collected Creole songs, creating her own arrangements of songs including Michieu banjo and Lizette, to quitte la plaine.

During the 1930s and into the 1950s she toured the United States as "The Louisiana Lady", singing creole songs and dressed in a series of ruffled gowns to evoke New Orleans history. She was a featured performer in the Negro Exhibits Building at the Texas Centennial Exposition in 1936. She toured France as a cultural relations representative in 1954, sponsored by the U.S. Information Agency (USIA); her success on radio and stage in France was helped by her fluent French.

From 1935 to 1938, Nickerson was president of the National Association of Negro Musicians. She was an officer of the organization as early as 1925. She was a member of Delta Sigma Theta. Some of her arrangements were published as Five Creole Songs Harmonized and Arranged by Camille Nickerson (1942).

== Selected works ==
- "Ai Suzette" for voice and piano
- Five Creole Songs for voice and piano
  1. Chere, Mo Lemmé Toi
  2. Dansé Conni Conné
  3. Fais Do Do
  4. Lizette Ma Cheré Amie
  5. M'schieu Banjo
- "Gue, Gue, Solingaie" for voice and piano
- "Mam'selle Zizi" for voice and piano

== Personal life and legacy ==
Nickerson died in Washington, D.C. in 1982, aged 94 years. Her papers were donated to Howard University. Tulane University's Hogan Jazz Archive holds some papers from Nickerson's New Orleans years.
