= Clarence Cameron White =

American violinist and composer (1880–1960)

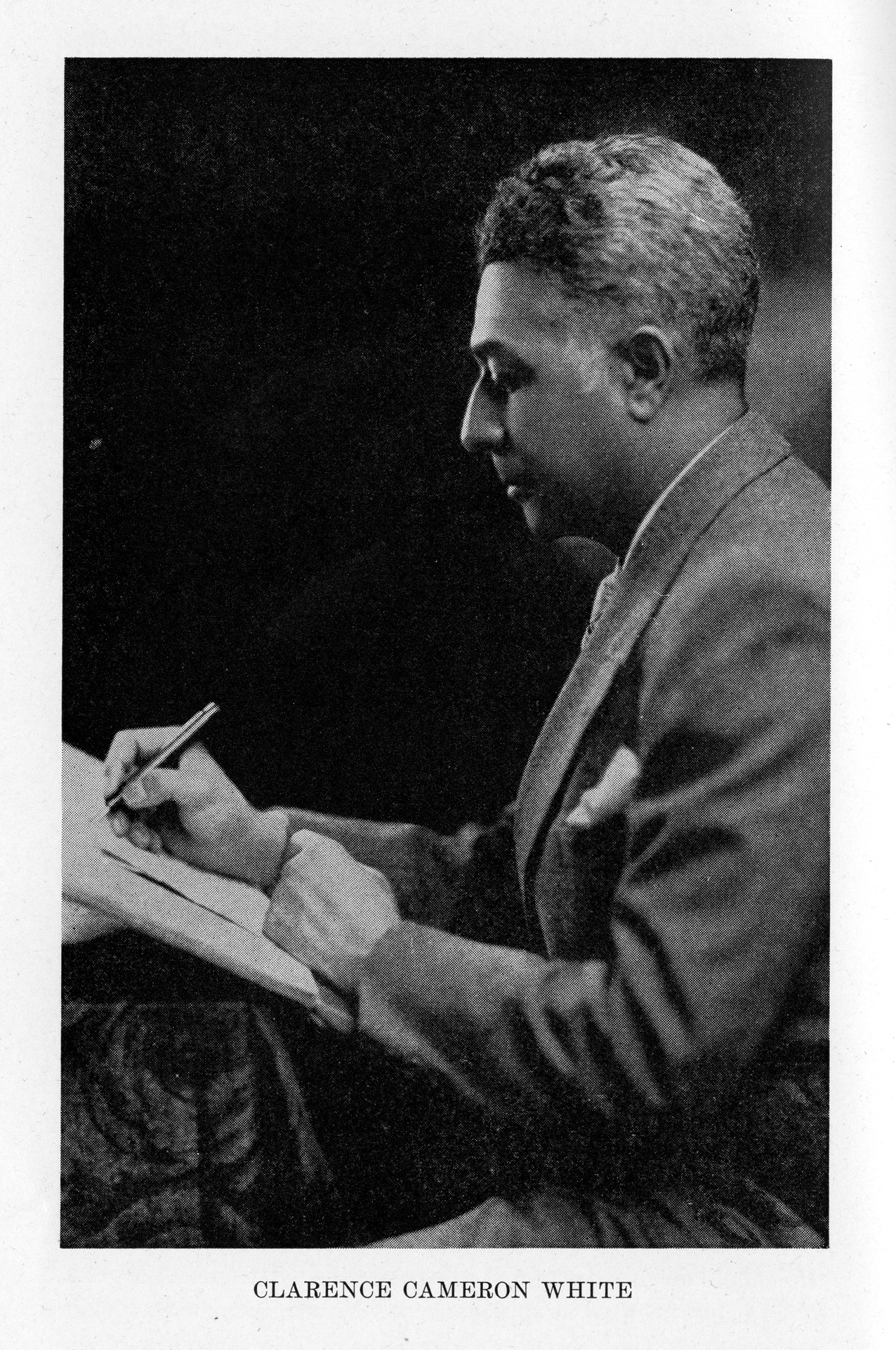

Background information
- Born: August 10, 1880; Clarksville, Tennessee, U.S.
- Died: June 30, 1960 (aged 79) New York City, U.S.
- Genre: Classical music
- Occupations: Composer, violinist, educator
- Years active: 1901–1960

Clarence Cameron White (August 10, 1880 – June 30, 1960) was an American neoromantic composer and concert violinist. Dramatic works by the composer were his best-known, such as the incidental music for the play Tambour and the opera Ouanga. During the first decades of the twentieth century, White was considered the foremost black violinist. He was a member of Alpha Phi Alpha fraternity.

== Early years ==
Born in Clarksville, Tennessee, to James W. White, a doctor and school principal, and Jennie Scott White, a violinist who studied at Oberlin Conservatory of Music. His father died when he was only two years old. White relocated with his mother and younger brother to Oberlin, Ohio, to live with her parents, where he was first exposed to the violin:

My mother took me to hear The Messiah sung at the conservatory and I came away humming snatches of it. Mother thought I had a good musical ear and persuaded my grandfather, who was a religious man, to give me his violin...I was only six at the time, nevertheless, my grandfather pouted, "I'll give him the violin. But if he ever plays at a dance I'll take it back."

In 1890, Mrs. White remarried and White relocated with his family to Washington, D.C., whose black communities had rich and active music scenes. Two years later, White met the violinist and composer Will Marion Cook, resulting from White falling asleep during Cook's recital:

One evening my mother took me to hear the pupils of Mrs. Alice Strange Davis, the most renowned piano teacher in Washington...I was especially anxious to hear Will Marion Cook play the violin. He...was to play a number toward the end of the program. As usual a program by pupils is rather a long-drawn-out affair, so by the time for Cook's number I had fallen asleep. I was awakened by a tremendous applause after his solo. When I was told that he had played I burst out crying and made such a fuss that my mother had to hustle me out of the concert and I went home in disgrace.

Cook inquired about the upset young boy and offered to give White violin lessons in the summer of 1892, an experience that had a profound effect on White: "Every lesson was one of pure joy, and it was during this period that I definitely made up my mind to be a violinist."

== Education ==
White continued his private studies in 1894 with Joseph Douglass, another notable black violinist and grandson of abolitionist Frederick Douglass, at Howard University. He attended Oberlin Conservatory of Music, the alma mater of his parents, from 1896 until 1901 where he studied with Frederick Doolittle, Cook's former violin teacher. White left in 1901 before graduating to accept a teaching position in Pittsburgh, Pennsylvania that fell through after one month. Shortly thereafter he won a violin scholarship through the Hartford School of Music where he studied with Franz Micki.

White was a protégé of Emma Azalia Hackley who raised money for his scholarship to allow him to study abroad. Traveling to London, he studied composition with Samuel Coleridge-Taylor in 1906; he returned to the city again from 1908 to 1910 to study violin with Michael Zacharewitsch. He received two fellowships from the Rosenwald Fund, which enabled him to spend two years from 1930 to 1932 in Paris, France where he studied with Raoul Laparra.

== Career ==
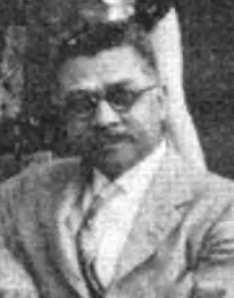
White, from a 1925 issue of The Crisis

White maintained an active career as a performer, teacher, and composer. From 1902 until 1903, White contributed articles on violin pedagogy and history to The Negro Music Journal and from 1903 until 1907 served as the head of the string department of the Washington Conservatory of Music, founded by pianist, educator, and Oberlin alumna, Harriet Gibbs Marshall. As a concert violinist he received critical praise and toured the United States with his wife, pianist Beatrice Warrick White. A founding member of the National Association of Negro Musicians, White served as the organization's president from 1922 to 1924. From 1924 to 1930, he taught at West Virginia State College and succeeded R. Nathaniel Dett as head of the music department of Hampton Institute from 1932 until 1935. In this period he wrote his best-known works: the ballet, A Night in Sans Souci—from the play Tambour, and the opera Ouanga. The lead role in Ouanga had been performed by baritone Lawrence Winters. These works are based on Haitian themes working with playwright and librettist John Matheus.

== Personal life ==
On April 24, 1905, he married pianist Beatrice Warrick. To this union were born two children:

- William Warrick White (March 27, 1906 – 1938)
- Clarence Cameron White, Jr. (March 11, 1908 – January 30, 1913)

Beatrice died at their home in Elizabeth, New Jersey, in October 1942. White soon moved to New York City and in 1943 married the librarian, writer, and puppeteer, Pura Belpré. White died from cancer on June 30, 1960.

== Compositional style ==
White's compositions contained a similar aesthetic to contemporaries and mentors such as William Grant Still, Florence Price, R. Nathaniel Dett, and Samuel Coleridge-Taylor. White drew upon thematic and harmonic content from African-American and other African diasporic musical styles and traditions. His early output consisted of compositions that incorporated quotes of spirituals and arrangements of spirituals such as Bandanna Sketches: Four Negro Spirituals, Camp Song: (Water Boy), Levee Dance, Forty Negro Spirituals, and Traditional Negro Spirituals. As he matured, he used more varied forms. The 1954 Benjamin Award was presented to him for Elegy, a composition for orchestra. He also used decidedly 'Negro' themes for his string quartet and other chamber music.

== List of musical compositions ==
- Bandanna Sketches: Four Negro Spirituals (1918)
- From The Cotton Fields Op. 18 (1920)
- Triumphal March (1926)
- Forty Negro Spirituals (1927)
- Camp Song: (Water Boy) Op. 26 No. 1 (1927)
- Levee Dance Op.27 No.2 (1927)
- Tambour (1929), a play by John Matheus
- Ouanga! (1932)
- Legende d'Afrique (1955)
- Spiritual Suite (1956) for four clarinets
- Elegy for orchestra

== Methods books ==
- A System of One Octave Scale Studies for the Violin (1915)
- The Violinist's Daily Dozen, Twelve Special Studies for the Development of Correct Finger Action in Violin Playing (1924)
