= Robert Nathaniel Dett =

Canadian-American Black composer (1882–1943)

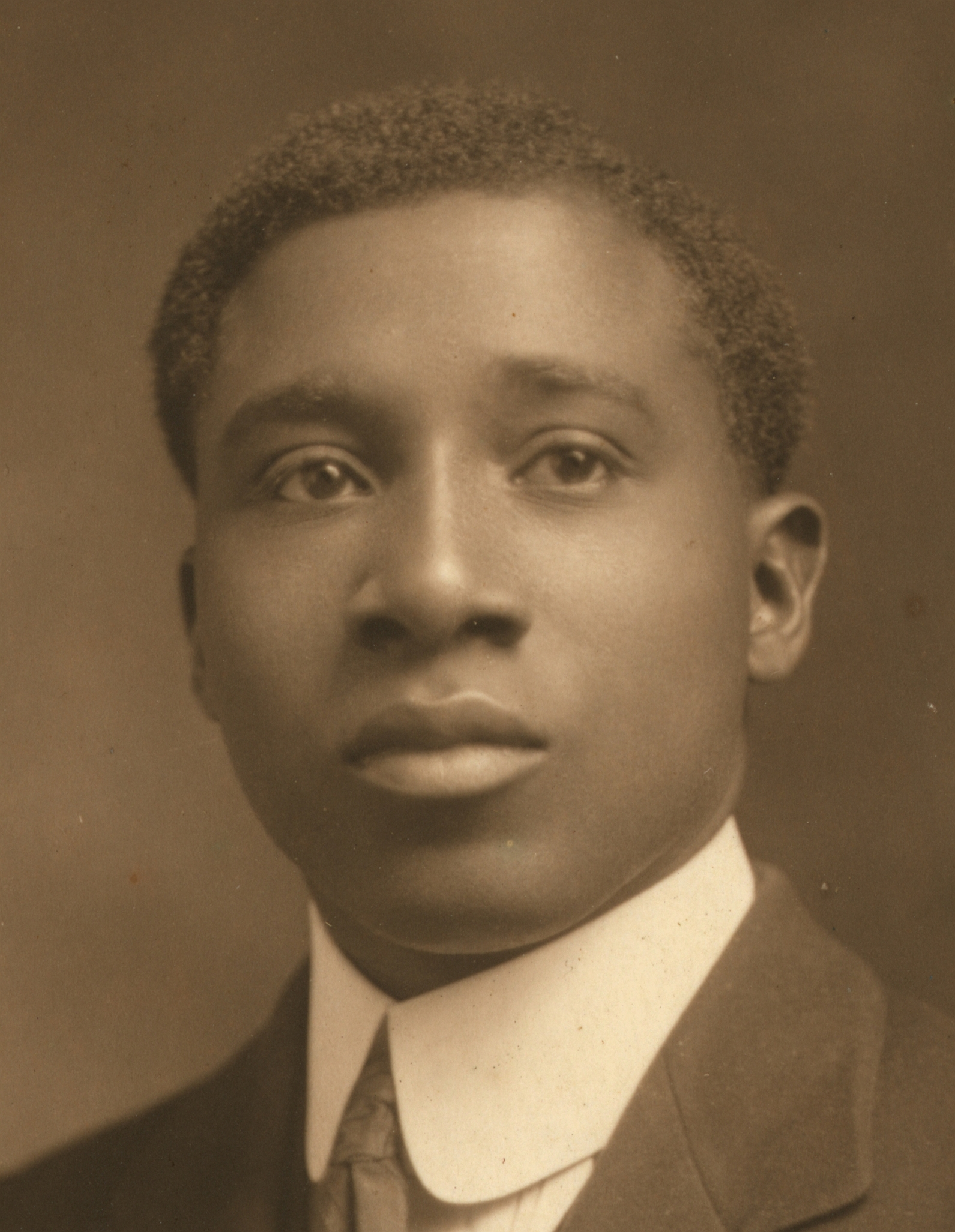
- Born: October 11, 1882; Niagara Falls, Ontario, Canada
- Died: October 2, 1943 (aged 60); Battle Creek, Michigan
- Resting place: Niagara Falls, Ontario, Canada
- Occupations: Composer, choral director, organist, pianist
- Writing career
- Pen name: R. Nathaniel Dett

Robert Nathaniel Dett (October 11, 1882 – October 2, 1943), often known as R. Nathaniel Dett and Nathaniel Dett, was a Canadian-American composer, organist, pianist, choral director, and music professor. Born and raised in Canada until the age of 11, he moved to the United States with his family and had most of his professional education and career there. During his lifetime he was a leading Black composer, known for his use of African-American folk songs and spirituals as the basis for choral and piano compositions in the 19th century Romantic style of Classical music.

He was among the first Black composers during the early years after the American Society of Composers, Authors and Publishers (ASCAP) was organized. His works often appeared among the programs of Will Marion Cook's New York Syncopated Orchestra. Dett performed at Carnegie Hall and at the Boston Symphony Hall as a pianist and choir director.

== Early life ==
Robert Nathaniel Dett was born in 1882 in Drummondville, Ontario (now part of Niagara Falls, Ontario, Canada), to Charlotte (Washington) Dett and Robert T. Dett. Descended from previously enslaved people who had escaped and travelled North, his mother was a native of Drummondville and his father was from the United States. The young Dett studied piano at an early age, showing initial interest when he was three years old and starting piano lessons at the age of five. When he was a child, his mother directed him to study Shakespeare, Longfellow and Tennyson, and commit passages to memory.

In 1893, the family moved over the border to Niagara Falls, New York. At about age 14, Dett played piano for his local church, the Methodist Mission Church, later renamed to R. Nathaniel Dett Memorial Chapel. He studied at the Oliver Willis Halstead Conservatory of Music from 1901 to 1903.

He continued his piano studies at the Lockport Conservatory, matriculating to the Oberlin Conservatory of Music in Ohio, where he first encountered the practice of incorporating spirituals in classical music. He heard the music of Antonín Dvořák, a Czech composer who had toured the United States and incorporated elements of American music in his own work, including the New World Symphony. He was also influenced by the composer Samuel Coleridge-Taylor who composed a set of three cantatas called The Song of Hiawatha based on a poem of the same name by American poet Henry Wadsworth Longfellow. Some of the music reminded Dett of the spirituals he had learned from his grandmother. He was the first black American to complete the Bachelor of Music degree at Oberlin (1908), for which he studied composition and piano. Dett toured as a concert pianist and during this period wrote only rudimentary piano compositions. He came under the influence of Emma Azalia Hackley, a soprano singer, who inspired his interest in black American folk music.

== Career ==
After graduation, Dett started teaching at Tennessee's Lane College, followed by a tenure at the Lincoln Institute in Jefferson City, Missouri. During this period, his compositional activities included writing practical choral and piano pieces suitable for his students. The 1913 piece In the Bottoms contains one of his most played movements, "Dance Juba". Fannie Bloomfield Zeisler performed the work at the Chicago Music Hall. In 1913 Dett began to teach at the Hampton Institute in Virginia, and in 1926 became the first black director of music there. He remained at Hampton until 1932. During his nearly twenty-year tenure, he founded the Hampton Choral Union, Musical Arts Society, Hampton Institute Choir and its School of Music. Internationally recognized, the choir specialized in African American sacred music and performed Dett's own compositions and arrangements. Sometimes, his arrangements were criticized for being "inauthentic" due to their similarities with Western classical music. He encouraged his Hampton student, soprano Dorothy Maynor, to pursue a career as a concert artist; she followed his advice to become one of the leading concert artists in the nation.

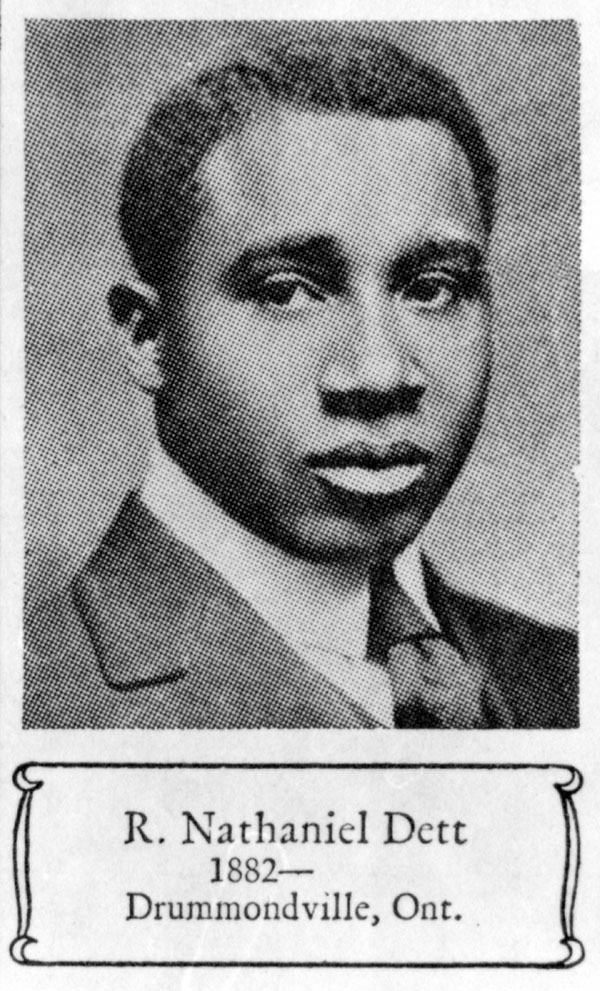
Dett as shown in a Library and Archives Canada photo

His position as a major pianist-composer was earned in 1914. His piece Magnolia was performed at the Samuel Coleridge-Taylor Club. On June 3 that year he performed Magnolia and In the Bottoms. The Chicago Evening Post reported that among the works on the "All Colored" program, his works were the most innovative, and it praised his high level of piano skills.

On December 27, 1916, Dett married Helen Elise Smith. She was the first black graduate of the Institute of Musical Art in New York City, which became known as the Juilliard School of performing arts.

In 1918, Dett wrote of his compositional goals:

We have this wonderful store of folk music—the melodies of an enslaved people ... But this store will be of no value unless we utilize it, unless we treat it in such manner that it can be presented in choral form, in lyric and operatic works, in concertos and suites and salon music—unless our musical architects take the rough timber of Negro themes and fashion from it music which will prove that we, too, have national feelings and characteristics, as have the European peoples whose forms we have zealously followed for so long.

Throughout his lifetime, Dett continued to study music, including studies at many prestigious institutions such as the American Conservatory of Music, at Columbia University, Northwestern University, the University of Pennsylvania, and Harvard. Each summer, he attended major national institutions. In 1919, he founded the Musical Arts Society which organized concerts with artists such as Marian Anderson, Henry T. Burleigh, Grainger, Roland Hayes, Sousa and Clarence Cameron White and the Belgian Royal Band who presented Dett with the Palm and Ribbon Award. From 1920 to 1921, he attended Harvard University, where he studied with Arthur Foote, winning two prizes. Don't Be Weary Traveller, a choral composition, won the Francis Boott Award, while his essay "The Emancipation of Negro Music" won the Bowdoin prize. His interest in composition had to accommodate his demands of teaching and administration. Percy Grainger recorded the "Juba" from In the Bottoms during Dett's year at Harvard.

Dett made arrangements of spirituals, which were published in collections, notably Religious Folksongs of the Negro (1927) and The Dett Collections of Negro Spirituals (1936). For his work as a composer in his own right, he received a Holstein prize.

From 1924 to 1926, Dett served as president of The National Association of Negro Musicians. Founded in Chicago in 1919, the association is the United States' oldest organization dedicated to the preservation, encouragement, and advocacy of all genres of African-American music. He also became involved with the National Association of Teachers in Colored Schools.

In 1929, Dett travelled to France to study at the Fontainebleau school of music with composer Nadia Boulanger. He earned a Masters of Music degree at the Eastman School of Music in Rochester in 1932.

In 1933, after resigning from the Hampton Institute, Dett served as the choral conductor for Stromberg-Carlson's NBC radio broadcasts. He wrote the oratorio The Ordering of Moses (1937). It was conducted by Eugene Goosens in its premiere on May 7, 1937, with a chorus of 350 and the Cincinnati Symphony Orchestra at the Cincinnati May Festival in Ohio.

From 1937 until 1942, Dett served as Visiting Director of Music at Bennett College in Greensboro, North Carolina. With its chorus he toured across Canada and the United States. They also performed on CBS radio broadcasts.

Late in his career, Dett shifted his style from that of his earlier neo-romantic works and adopted more contemporary idioms. In this later period he wrote piano suites such as American Ordering of Moses (1937), Tropic Winter (1938), and Eight Bible Vignettes (1941–1943)—his final piano suite.

Dett joined the United Service Organization (USO) as a choral advisor to contribute to the war efforts in supporting US troops during World War II. Travelling with the USO chorus, he died of a heart attack on October 2, 1943. He was buried beside his wife as well as his two daughters, in the town of his birth at Niagara Falls, Ontario, Canada.

=== Legacy and honours ===
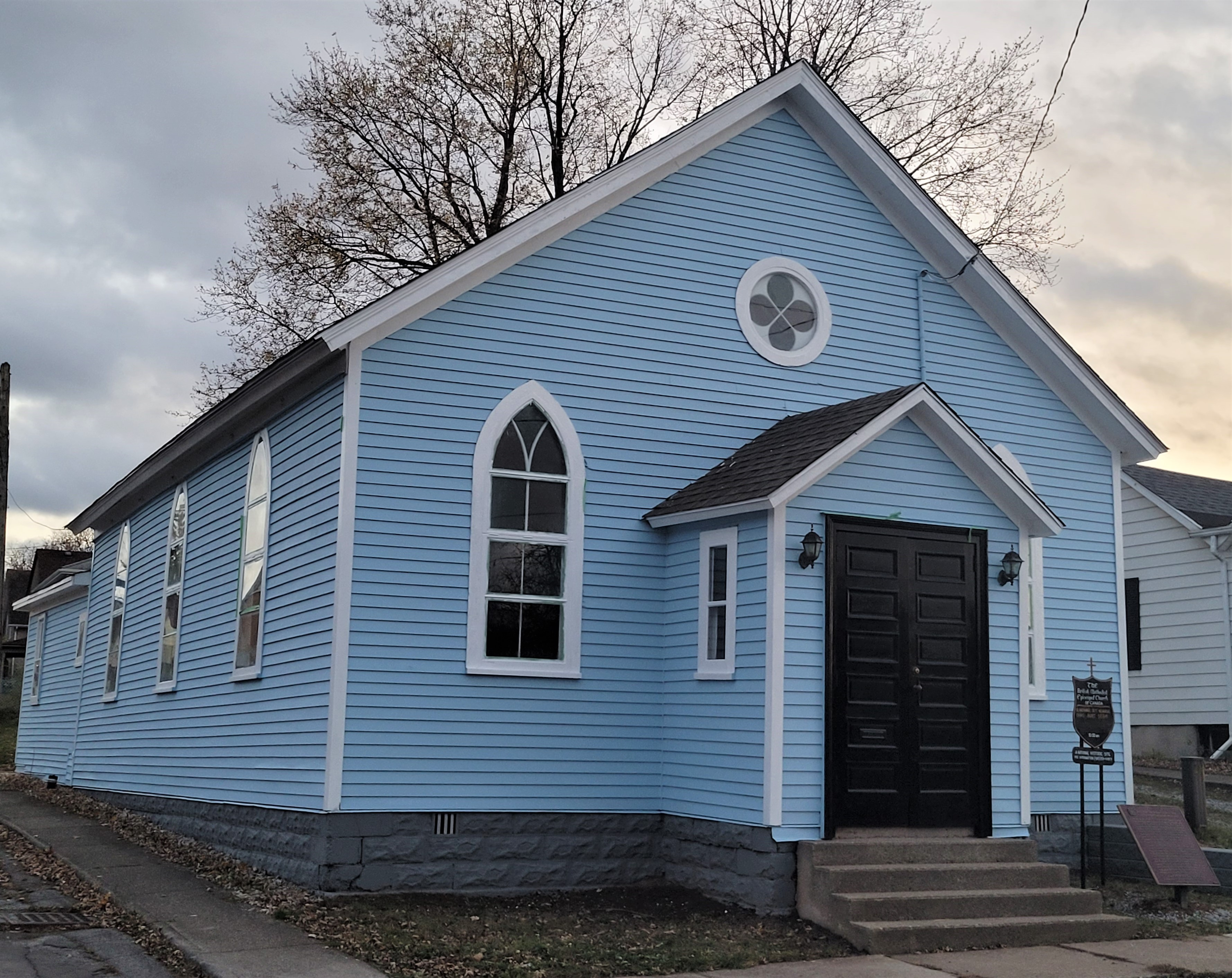
R. Nathaniel Dett British Methodist Episcopal Church, Niagara Falls, Ontario. National Historic Site of Canada

In the 2000s, Dett is remembered most for his work in creating music in the style of the European Romantic composers that incorporated elements of African-American spirituals. His music is still performed in the 2000s. Canada's Nathaniel Dett Chorale, founded in 1998, was named for him and performs his music as well as that of other composers of African descent. The chorale is one of many that has recorded his music. In 2022 a previously unknown orchestral version of his Magnolia Suite Part Two: No 4 “Mammy” was found in a US archive.

In 2014, his oratorio The Ordering of Moses was revived by the Cincinnati May Festival, and performed the same week in Music Hall in Cincinnati and at Carnegie Hall in New York. The incident from the world premiere in 1937, when the live broadcast was cut off by the NBC network during the performance, was re-created, using tapes of the announcer. There is no documented account of the reason for the interruption of the broadcast.

In 1934 Dett, and/or his publisher, registered strong objections to saxophonist Frank Trumbauer's swing band adaptation of "Juba Dance", from the suite In the Bottoms. Brunswick Records was compelled to withdraw the recording (#6763) from release.

Dett did little recording of his music. In 1912 he recorded five selections from the Magnolia Suite for QRS piano rolls. These are believed to be the first commercial piano rolls ever made by a black pianist. In 1919 he recorded two selections for Broome Special Phonograph Records, "Mammy" from Magnolia Suite and "Barcarolle" from In the Bottoms. The latter can be found on the CD Lost Sounds, Archeophone ARCH 1005.

In 1993 Anne Key Simpson published a biography of Dett, Follow Me: the Life and Music of R. Nathaniel Dett.

The former British Methodist Episcopal Church in Niagara Falls, Ontario, was renamed in honour of Dett. From 1898 to 1903, he was the organist at that church. The church was designated in 2001 as a National Historic Site of Canada.

The Robert Nathaniel Dett Elementary School in Chicago is named for him.

== Awards and honours ==
- Bowdoin Literary Prize (1921), for his essay, "The Emancipation of Negro Music", from Harvard.
- Francis Boott Music Award for his choral composition "Don't be Weary Traveller," from Harvard.
- Harmon Foundation Award.
- Honorary Doctorate (1924) from Howard.
- Honorary Doctorate (1926) from Oberlin College.

== Compositions and arrangements ==
Many of his works were published, includes those for piano, choir, voice, organ, and orchestra:

- After the Cakewalk (1900)
- Cave of the Winds (1902), march and two-step
- Magnolia (1912), suite for solo piano
- In the Bottoms (1913), a "characteristic suite" of five movements
- Listen to the Lambs (1914), "a religious character in the form of an anthem"
- Music in the Mine (1916), a choral work
- I'll Never Turn Back no More (1916)
- The Chariot Jubilee (1921), for tenor, chorus, and orchestra.
- Don't be Weary, Traveler (1921)
- Enchantment (1922), a suite for solo piano
- Listen to the Lambs (1923)
- Let us Cheer the Weary Traveller (1926)
- O Hear the Lambs A-Cryin' (1926)
- Religious Folksongs of the Negro (1927), collection of arranged spirituals
- The Cinnamon Grove (1928), a suite for solo piano
- Ave Maria (1930)
- The Dett Collection of Negro Spirituals (1936)
- The Ordering of Moses (1937)
- Tropic Winter (1938), a suite for solo piano
- Eight Bible Vignettes (1941–1943)
- I am the True Vine (1943), for piano
- No More Auction Block (unpublished), for orchestra

=== In the Bottoms ===
In the Bottoms, subtitled "Suite caractéristique", is a suite for piano in five movements.

1. "Prelude (Night)"
2. "His Song"
3. "Honey (Humoresque)"
4. "Barcarolle (Morning)"
5. "Dance (Juba)"

== Writings ==
- "The Emancipation of Negro Music". Southern Workman (1918): 172–6.
- "From Bell Stand to Throne Room". Etude Music Magazine 52 (1934): 79–80.

== In popular culture ==
Mark Williams Jr. portrays Dett in episode 20 of season 17 "Rhapsody in Blood" (March 11, 2024) of the Canadian television period detective series Murdoch Mysteries.

== See also ==
- List of Canadian composers
- Music of Canada
- Nathaniel Dett Chorale
- Zenobia Powell Perry, one of his students
