= Chronological list of American classical composers =

The following is a chronological list (by year of birth) of American composers of classical music.

== Baroque ==
- John Tufts (1689–1750)
- Charles Theodore Pachelbel (1690–1750)
- Thomas Walter (1696–1725)

== Classical era ==
- Jeremiah Dencke (1725–1795)
- Philip Phile (c. 1734–1793)
- James Lyon (1735–1794)
- Johannes Herbst (1735–1812)
- Francis Hopkinson (1737–1791)
- William Selby (1738–1798)
- John Antes (1740–1811)
- Peter Valton (1740–1784)
- Amos Bull (1744–1825)
- Samuel Capen (1745–1809)
- Victor Pelissier (1745–c. 1820)
- William Billings (1746–1800)
- Oliver Brownson (1746–1815)
- Simeon Jocelin (1746–1823)
- Johann Friedrich Peter (1746–1813)
- Justin Morgan (1747–1798)
- Raynor Taylor (1747–1825)
- Lewis Edson Sr. (1748–1820)
- Andrew Law (1749–1821)
- Elias Mann (1750–1825)
- David Moritz Michael (1751–1827)
- Supply Belcher (1751–1836)
- Abraham Wood (1752–1804)
- Jacob French (1754–1817)
- Asahel Benham (1754–1803)
- Solomon Chandler (1756–c. 1804)
- John Christopher Moller (1755–1803)
- Alexander Reinagle (1756–1809)
- Daniel Read (1757–1836)
- Issachar Bates (1758–1837)
- Amariah Hall (1758–1827)
- Timothy Swan (1758–1842)
- Timothy Olmstead (1759–1848)
- Lucius Chapin (1760–1842)
- Ezra Goff (1760–1828)
- Edward French (1761–1845)
- Jacob Kimball Jr. (1761–1826)
- Nehemiah Shumway (1761–1843)
- Elijah Griswold (1762–1844)
- Samuel Adams Holyoke (1762–1820)
- Jeremiah Ingalls (1764–1838)
- Oliver Holden (1765–1844)
- Nathaniel Billings (1768–1853)
- Benjamin Carr (1768–1831)
- Amzi Chapin (1768–1835)
- Nahum Mitchell (1769–1853)
- Ebenezer Child (1770–1866)
- James Hewitt (1770–1827)
- Warwick Palfray (1770–1843)
- Thomas Temple (1770–1815)
- Daniel Belknap (1771–1815)
- Lewis Edson Jr. (1771–1845)
- Joseph Herrick (1772–1807)
- Joel Harmon, Jr. (1773–1833)
- John Cole (1774–1855)
- Benjamin Holt (1774–1861)
- Joseph Funk (1778–1862)
- Merit Woodruff (1780–1799)
- John Bray (1782–1822)
- Elkanah Dare (1782–1826)
- Philip Antony Corri (1784–1832)

== Romantic era ==
- Eliakim Doolittle (1772–1850)
- Stephen Jenks (1772–1856)
- Oliver Shaw (1779–1848)
- Anthony Philip Heinrich (1781–1861)
- Thomas Hastings (1784–1872)
- Francis Johnson (1792–1844)
- Lowell Mason (1792–1872)
- Charles Zeuner (1795–1857)
- Joseph Brackett, Jr. (1797–1882)
- Henry K. Oliver (1800–1885)
- Francis Boott (1813–1904)
- William Henry Fry (1813–1864)
- Henry F. Williams (1813–c. 1903)
- William Batchelder Bradbury (1816–1868)
- Justin Holland (1819–1887)
- Richard Storrs Willis (1819–1900)
- Isaac B. Woodbury (1819–1858)
- Victor-Eugène McCarty (1820–1881)
- George Frederick Root (1820–1895)
- George Frederick Bristow (1825–1898)
- Horace Weston (1825–1890)
- Stephen Foster (1826–1864)
- Edmond Dédé (1827–1903)
- Charles Lucien Lambert (1828–1896)
- J. C. D. Parker (1828–1916)
- Louis Moreau Gottschalk (1829–1869)
- William Mason (1829–1908)
- Richard Hoffman (1831–1909)
- Charles Crozat Converse (1832–1918)
- Walter Kittredge (1834–1905)
- Samuel Snaër (1835–1900)
- Benjamin Johnson Lang (1837–1909)
- Frederic Archer (1838–1901)
- Sidney Lambert (1838–1905)
- Eugene Thayer (1838–1889)
- Carl Baermann (pianist) (1839–1913)
- Dudley Buck (1839–1909)
- John Knowles Paine (1839–1906)
- Benjamin Dwight Allen (1841–1914)
- William W. Gilchrist (1846–1916)
- Silas G. Pratt (1846–1916)
- John Thomas Douglass (1847–1886)
- Frederick Grant Gleason (1848–1903)
- Thomas Greene Wiggins (1849–1908)
- Emma Roberto Steiner (1852–1929)
- Arthur Foote (1853–1937)
- Edwin Arthur Jones (1853–1911)
- George Whitefield Chadwick (1854–1931)
- John Philip Sousa (1854–1932)
- Johann H. Beck (1856–1924)
- George Strong (1856–1948)
- Arthur H. Bird (1856–1923)
- Humphrey John Stewart (1856–1932)
- Edgar Stillman Kelley (1857–1944)
- Henry Schoenefeld (1857–1936)
- Timothee Adamowski (1858–1943)
- Harry Rowe Shelley (1858–1947)
- Frank Van der Stucken (1858–1929)
- Victor Herbert (1859–1924)
- Reginald De Koven (1859–1920)
- Edward MacDowell (1860–1908)
- Charles Martin Loeffler (1861–1935)
- Arthur Batelle Whiting (1861–1936)
- Walter Damrosch (1862–1950)
- Henry Holden Huss (1862–1953)
- Ethelbert Nevin (1862–1901)
- William Dayas (1863–1903)
- Horatio Parker (1863–1919)
- Sidney Homer (1864?–1953)
- Jean Paul Kürsteiner (1864–1943)
- Frances Gotay (1865–1932)
- Harvey Worthington Loomis (1865–1930)
- Maurice Arnold Strothotte (1865–1937)
- Harry Burleigh (1866–1949)
- Laurent Dubuclet (1866–1909)
- Swan Hennessy (1866–1929)
- Carl Valentin Wunderle (1866–1944)
- Amy Beach (1867–1944)
- Margaret Ruthven Lang (1867–1972)
- Henry F. Gilbert (1868–1928)
- Charles Sanford Skilton (1868–1941)
- Will Marion Cook (1869–1944)
- Harry Lawrence Freeman (1869–1954)
- Victor Harris (1869–1943)

== Modern/contemporary ==
- Scott Joplin (1867/68–1917)
- Joseph Carl Breil (1870–1926)
- Howard Brockway (1870–1951)
- Louis Coerne (1870–1922)
- Henry Eichheim (1870–1942)
- Frederick Converse (1871–1940)
- Henry Kimball Hadley (1871–1937)
- Arthur Nevin (1871–1943)
- Estelle Ricketts (1871–19??)
- Arthur Farwell (1872–1952)
- Rubin Goldmark (1872–1936)
- Edward Burlingame Hill (1872–1960)
- J. Rosamond Johnson (1873–1954)
- Daniel Gregory Mason (1873–1953)
- Mary Carr Moore (1873–1957)
- Fitzhugh Andrews (1873–1961)
- Anna Gardner Goodwin (1874–1959)
- Charles Ives (1874–1954)
- Josef Hofmann (1876–1957)
- Bert R. Anthony (1876–1923)
- Frederick Ayres (1876–1926)
- John Alden Carpenter (1876–1951)
- Carl Ruggles (1876–1971)
- Mabel Wheeler Daniels (1877–1971)
- Blair Fairchild (1877–1933)
- George M. Cohan (1878–1942)
- Frank La Forge (1879–1953)
- Ernest Bloch (1880–1959)
- Arthur Shepherd (1880–1958)
- Clarence Cameron White (1880–1960)
- Charles Wakefield Cadman (1881–1946)
- James Reese Europe (1881–1919)
- Richard Hageman (1881–1966)
- Mary Howe (1882–1964)
- Paul Hastings Allen (1882–1952)
- Marion Bauer (1882–1955)
- Seth Bingham (1882–1972)
- Robert Nathaniel Dett (1882–1943)
- Ralph Lyford (1882–1927)
- Charles Tomlinson Griffes (1884–1920)
- Louis Gruenberg (1884–1964)
- Nora Holt (c. 1884–1974)
- Wallingford Riegger (1885–1961)
- Deems Taylor (1885–1966)
- John J. Becker (1886–1961)
- Edward Joseph Collins (1886–1951)
- Joseph Lamb (1887–1960)
- Florence Price (1887–1953)
- Ernst Toch (1887–1964)
- Philip Greeley Clapp (1888–1954)
- Hall Johnson (1888–1970)
- Artie Matthews (1888–1958)
- Philip James (1890–1975)
- Harold Morris (1890–1964)
- Frederick Jacobi (1891–1952)
- Edward Henry Margetson (1891–1962)
- Katherine K. Davis (1892–1980)
- Ferde Grofé (1892–1972)
- David Guion (1892–1981)
- Lawrence Benjamin Brown (1893–1972)
- Douglas Moore (1893–1969)
- Leo Ornstein (1893–2002)
- Bernard Rogers (1893–1968)
- John Laurence Seymour (1893–1986)
- Clarence Williams (1893?–1965)
- Robert Russell Bennett (1894–1981)
- Cecil Cohen (1894–1967)
- Edmund Jenkins (1894–1926)
- James P. Johnson (1894–1955)
- Jimmy McHugh (1894–1969)
- Walter Piston (1894–1976)
- Mark Wessel (1894–1973)
- Penman Lovinggood Sr (1895–1993)
- Carl McKinley (1895–1966)
- Leo Sowerby (1895–1968)
- William Grant Still (1895–1978)
- Howard Hanson (1896–1981)
- Leroy Robertson (1896–1971)
- Roger Sessions (1896–1985)
- Virgil Thomson (1896–1989)
- Jaromír Weinberger (1896–1967)
- Henry Cowell (1897–1965)
- Erich Korngold (1897–1957)
- Stanley R. Avery (1897–1967)
- Quincy Porter (1897–1966)
- Ernst Bacon (1898–1990)
- Avery Claflin (1898–1979)
- George Gershwin (1898–1937)
- Frederick Douglass Hall (1898–1982)
- Roy Harris (1898–1979)
- Radie Britain (1899–1994)
- William Levi Dawson (1899–1990)
- John Woods Duke (1899–1984)
- Duke Ellington (1899–1974)
- George Frederick McKay (1899–1970)
- Randall Thompson (1899–1984)
- George Antheil (1900–1959)
- Aaron Copland (1900–1990)
- Willis Laurence James (1900–1966)
- Ernst Krenek (1900–1991)
- Otto Luening (1900–1996)
- Elinor Remick Warren (1900–1991)
- Alfredo Antonini (1901–1983)
- Ruth Crawford Seeger (1901–1953)
- Harry Partch (1901–1974)
- John Wesley Work III (1901–1967)
- Celius Dougherty (1902–1986)
- John Vincent (1902–1977)
- Meredith Willson (1902–1984)
- Stefan Wolpe (1902–1972)
- Vernon Duke (1903–1969)
- Vittorio Giannini (1903–1966)
- Undine Smith Moore (1904–1989)
- Marc Blitzstein (1905–1964)
- Paul Creston (1906–1985)
- Ross Lee Finney (1906–1997)
- Miriam Gideon (1906–1996)
- Hubert Klyne Headley (1906–1996)
- Normand Lockwood (1906–2002)
- Willson Osborne (1906–1979)
- Louise Talma (1906–1996)
- David Tamkin (1906–1975)
- David Van Vactor (1906–1994)
- Franz Waxman (1906–1967)
- Burrill Phillips (1907–1988)
- Irene Britton Smith (1907–1999)
- Howard Swanson (1907–1978)
- Alec Wilder (1907–1980)
- Leroy Anderson (1908–1975)
- Elliott Carter (1908–2012)
- Herbert Franklin Mells (1908–1953)
- Zenobia Powell Perry (1908–2004)
- Halsey Stevens (1908–1989)
- John Verrall (1908–2001)
- Charles Naginski (1909–1940)
- Elie Siegmeister (1909–1991)
- Samuel Barber (1910–1981)
- Paul Bowles (1910–1999)
- William Schuman (1910–1992)
- Mark Oakland Fax (1911–1974)
- Bernard Herrmann (1911–1975)
- Alan Hovhaness (1911–2000)
- Gian Carlo Menotti (1911–2007)
- Julia Smith (1911–1989)
- Vladimir Ussachevsky (1911–1990)
- Wayne Barlow (1912–1996)
- Arthur Berger (1912–2003)
- John Cage (1912–1992)
- Don Gillis (1912–1978)
- Conlon Nancarrow (1912–1997)
- Hugo Weisgall (1912–1997)
- Milton Adolphus (1913–1988)
- Margaret Bonds (1913–1972)
- Henry Brant (1913–2008)
- Norman Dello Joio (1913–2008)
- Alvin Etler (1913–1973)
- Vivian Fine (1913–2000)
- Clare Grundman (1913–1996)
- Morton Gould (1913–1996)
- Jerome Moross (1913–1983)
- Gardner Read (1913–2005)
- Robert Arthur Gross (1914–1983)
- Edgar Rogie Clark (1914–1978)
- Cecil Effinger (1914–1990)
- Irving Fine (1914–1963)
- Roger Goeb (1914–1997)
- Alexei Haieff (1914–1994)
- Gail Kubik (1914–1984)
- Earl Wild (1915–2010)
- Frantz Casséus (1915–1993)
- David Diamond (1915–2005)
- Thomas Henderson Kerr (1915–1988)
- George Perle (1915–2009)
- Vincent Persichetti (1915–1987)
- Robert Strassburg (1915–2003)
- Gordon Binkerd (1916–2003)
- Milton Babbitt (1916–2011)
- Houston Bright (1916–1970)
- Merrill Leroy Ellis (1916–1981)
- Ellis B. Kohs (1916–2000)
- Ben Weber (1916–1979)
- Ruth Shaw Wylie (1916–1989)
- Edward T. Cone (1917–2004)
- Robert Erickson (1917–1997)
- Lou Harrison (1917–2003)
- Ulysses Kay (1917–1995)
- Robert Ward (1917–2013)
- Richard Yardumian (1917–1985)
- Leonard Bernstein (1918–1990)
- Howard Boatwright (1918–1999)
- George Rochberg (1918–2005)
- Joseph Willard Roosevelt (1918–2008)
- Jacob Avshalomov (1919–2013)
- Leon Kirchner (1919–2009)
- Paul Manz (1919–2009)
- Helen Tobias-Duesberg (1919–2010)
- John Lessard (1920–2003)
- William Cooper (1920–1993)
- Earl Kim (1920–1998)
- John La Montaine (1920–2013)
- Harold Shapero (1920–2013)
- Douglas Allanbrook (1921–2003)
- Jack Beeson (1921–2010)
- William Bergsma (1921–1994)
- Karel Husa (1921–2016)
- Andrew Imbrie (1921–2007)
- Ralph Shapey (1921–2002)
- Leo Smit (1921–1999)
- John Boda (1922–2002)
- Romeo Cascarino (1922–2002)
- Rachel Eubanks (1922–2006)
- Lukas Foss (1922–2009)
- David N. Johnson (1922–1987)
- Francis Thorne (1922–2017)
- George Walker (1922–2018)
- Leslie Bassett (1923–2016)
- Jean Eichelberger Ivey (1923–2010)
- Ursula Mamlok (1923–2016)
- Peter Mennin (1923–1983)
- Ned Rorem (1923–2022)
- Daniel Pinkham (1923–2006)
- Mel Powell (1923–1998)
- Mark Bucci (1924–2002)
- Ezra Laderman (1924–2015)
- Benjamin Lees (1924–2010)
- Julia Perry (1924–1979)
- Robert Starer (1924–2001)
- Tony Acquaviva (1925–1986)
- Robert Beadell (1925–1994)
- Caesar Giovannini (1925–2017)
- Richard Hoffmann (1925–2021)
- Frank Lewin (1925–2008)
- Kirke Mechem (born 1925)
- Robert Owens (1925–2017)
- Gunther Schuller (1925–2015)
- Hale Smith (1925–2009)
- Paul W. Whear (1925–2021)
- Edward Bland (1926–2013)
- Earle Brown (1926–2002)
- Charles Dewitt Coleman (1926–1991)
- Paul Cooper (1926–1996)
- Richard Faith (1926–2021)
- Morton Feldman (1926–1987)
- Carlisle Floyd (1926–2021)
- Lee Hoiby (1926–2011)
- Ben Johnston (1926–2019)
- Robert Hall Lewis (1926–1996)
- William O. Smith (1926–2020)
- David Tudor (1926–1996)
- Dominick Argento (1927–2019)
- John W. Downey (1927–2004)
- Donald Erb (1927–2008)
- Walter S. Hartley (1927–2016)
- Janet Maguire (1927–2019)
- Salvatore Martirano (1927–1995)
- Richard Maxfield (1927–1969)
- Gertrude Rivers Robinson (1927–1995)
- Richard Swift (1927–2003)
- Samuel Adler (born 1928)
- Ruth Anderson (1928–2019)
- T. J. Anderson (born 1928)
- James Cohn (1928–2021)
- Arthur Cunningham (1928–1997)
- Jacob Druckman (1928–1996)
- Nicolas Flagello (1928–1994)
- Robert Helps (1928–2001)
- Betty Jackson King (1928–1994)
- Thea Musgrave (born 1928)
- George Crumb (1929–2022)
- Leonard Kastle (1929–2011)
- Charles Knox (1929–2019)
- Robert Muczynski (1929–2010)
- André Previn (1929–2019)
- Cecil Taylor (1929–2018)
- Yehudi Wyner (born 1929)
- Muhal Richard Abrams (1930–2017)
- David Amram (born 1930)
- Stanley Myers (1930–1993)
- Robert Ashley (1930–2014)
- Larry Austin (1930–2018)
- Robert Cogan (1930–2021)
- Ornette Coleman (1930–2015)
- Frederick C. Tillis (1930–2020)
- David Baker (1931–2016)
- Frederick A. Fox (1931–2011)
- Richard Hundley (1931–2018)
- Alvin Lucier (1931–2021)
- Peter Westergaard (1931–2019)
- Donald Martino (1931–2005)
- Tod Dockstader (1932–2015)
- Leslie Adams (1932–2024)
- John D. Carter (1932–1981)
- Roland Hanna (1932–2002)
- Michael Horvit (born 1932)
- Leroy Jenkins (1932–2007)
- Marvin David Levy (1932–2015)
- Martin Mailman (1932–2000)
- Pauline Oliveros (1932–2016)
- Coleridge-Taylor Perkinson (1932–2004)
- John Towner Williams (born 1932)
- Garland Anderson (1933–2001)
- Leonardo Balada (born 1933)
- Easley Blackwood, Jr. (1933-2023)
- Pozzi Escot (born 1933)
- Morton Subotnick (born 1933)
- Christian Wolff (composer) (born 1934)
- Robert T. Anderson (1934–2009)
- Benjamin Boretz (born 1934)
- Mario Davidovsky (1934–2019)
- Bernard Rands (1934–2026)
- James Tenney (1934–2006)
- Fisher Tull (1934–1994)
- Richard Wernick (1934–2025)
- Gerald Busby (born 1935)
- Samuel Jones (born 1935)
- John Elwood Price (1935–1995)
- Terry Riley (born 1935)
- Peter Schickele (1935-2024)
- Charles Shere (1935–2020)
- Conrad Susa (1935–2013)
- La Monte Young (born 1935)
- Harold Budd (1936–2020)
- Stuart Dempster (born 1936)
- Steve Reich (born 1936)
- David Ward-Steinman (1936–2015)
- Robert Suderburg (1936–2013)
- Jan Bach (1937–2020)
- Randolph Coleman (1937–2025)
- David Del Tredici (1937–2023)
- Philip Glass (born 1937)
- Robert Moran (born 1937)
- Barry Vercoe (1937–2025)
- Maryanne Amacher (1938–2009)
- William Bolcom (born 1938)
- David Borden (born 1938)
- Paul Chihara (born 1938)
- Gloria Coates (1938–2023)
- John Corigliano (born 1938)
- Alvin Curran (born 1938)
- John Harbison (born 1938)
- Frederic Rzewski (1938–2021)
- Gregory Short (1938–1999)
- Harvey Sollberger (born 1938)
- Joan Tower (born 1938)
- Charles Wuorinen (1938–2020)
- Jon Appleton (1939–2022)
- Tom Johnson (1939–2024)
- Tomas Svoboda (1939–2022)
- Ellen Taaffe Zwilich (born 1939)
- Margaret Brouwer (born 1940)
- Frank Zappa (1940-1993)
- Curtis Curtis-Smith (1941–2014)
- Philip Krumm (born 1941)
- Frank Proto (born 1941)
- Elizabeth Walton Vercoe (born 1941)
- Roger Lee Hall (born 1942)
- Meredith Monk (born 1942)
- Alice Shields (born 1943)
- Moshe Cotel (1943–2008)
- Jerry Hunt (1943–1993)
- Morten Lauridsen (born 1943)
- David Maslanka (1943–2017)
- Robert Morris (born 1943)
- Joseph Schwantner (born 1943)
- Paul Lansky (born 1944)
- William Albright (1944–1998)
- Charles Amirkhanian (born 1945)
- Thomas Oboe Lee (born 1945)
- Thomas Pasatieri (born 1945)
- Gene Tyranny (1945–2020)
- Judith Lang Zaimont (born 1945)
- Peter Lieberson (1946–2011)
- Marc Neikrug (born 1946)
- David Noon (born 1946)
- Robert Xavier Rodriguez (born 1946)
- Marilyn Shrude (born 1946)
- Jan Swafford (born 1946)
- John Coolidge Adams (born 1947)
- Roger Craig Vogel (born 1947)
- Gwyneth Walker (born 1947)
- Thomas Albert (born 1948)
- Richard Festinger (born 1948)
- Bernadette Speach (born 1948)
- William Ackerman (born 1949)
- Stephen Paulus (1949–2014)
- Christopher Rouse (1949–2019)
- Steven Stucky (1949–2016)
- James Adler (born 1950)
- David DeBoor Canfield (born 1950)
- Frank Ferko (born 1950)
- Michael Schelle (born 1950)
- Curt Cacioppo (born 1951)
- Craig Russell (born 1951)
- Roger Bourland (born 1952)
- Roger Briggs (born 1952)
- Robert Een (born 1952)
- Donal Fox (born 1952)
- John Luther Adams (born 1953)
- Martin Amlin (born 1953)
- Daniel Asia (born 1953)
- David Leisner (born 1953)
- Roberto Sierra (born 1953)
- Robert Beaser (born 1954)
- Michael Daugherty (born 1954)
- Brenda Hutchinson (born 1954)
- Bruce Adolphe (born 1955)
- David Conte (born 1955)
- Kyle Gann (born 1955)
- Craig Bohmler (born 1956)
- Richard Danielpour (born 1956)
- Kenneth Fuchs (born 1956)
- Michael Gandolfi (born 1956)
- Thomas Sleeper (1956–2022)
- Michael Glenn Williams (born 1957)
- Miguel del Aguila (born 1957)
- Douglas Knehans (born 1957)
- Paul Moravec (born 1957)
- Mikel Rouse (born 1957)
- Scott Lindroth (born 1958)
- Juliana Hall (born 1958)
- Frank Ticheli (born 1958)
- Sebastian Currier (born 1959)
- Timothy Kramer (born 1959)
- Jeremy Beck (born 1960)
- Sidney Corbett (born 1960)
- Kamran Ince (born 1960)
- Thomas Hecht (born 1960)
- Cindy Cox (born 1961)
- Daron Hagen (born 1961)
- Edward Knight (born 1961)
- Lowell Liebermann (born 1961)
- Michael Torke (born 1961)
- Brad Lubman (born 1962)
- Michael Abels (born 1962)
- Mark Adamo (born 1962)
- Jennifer Higdon (born 1962)
- Evan Chambers (born 1963)
- Augusta Read Thomas (born 1964)
- Lauren Bernofsky (born 1967)
- Evan Hause (born 1967)
- Christopher Theofanidis (born 1967)
- Gregory Mertl (born 1969)
- Peter Boyer (born 1970)
- Eric Whitacre (born 1970)
- Timothy Archambault (born 1971)
- Peter Askim (born 1971)
- Jason Wright Wingate (born 1971)
- Dan Coleman (born 1972)
- Gabriela Lena Frank (born 1972)
- Carter Pann (born 1972)
- John Mackey (born 1973)
- Aaron Cassidy (born 1976)
- Yotam Haber (born 1976)
- Wayne Oquin (born 1977)
- Kirsten Broberg (born 1979)
- Evan Johnson (born 1980)
- Scott Perkins (born 1980)
- Ruby Fulton (born 1981)
- Jessie Montgomery (born 1981)
- Nico Muhly (born 1981)
- Nicholas Urie (born 1985)
- Roger Zare (born 1985)
- Carlos Simon (born 1986)
- Michael Brown (born 1987)
- Thomas Kotcheff (born 1988)
- Conrad Tao (born 1994)
