= Thomas Henderson Kerr Jr. =

African American Musician

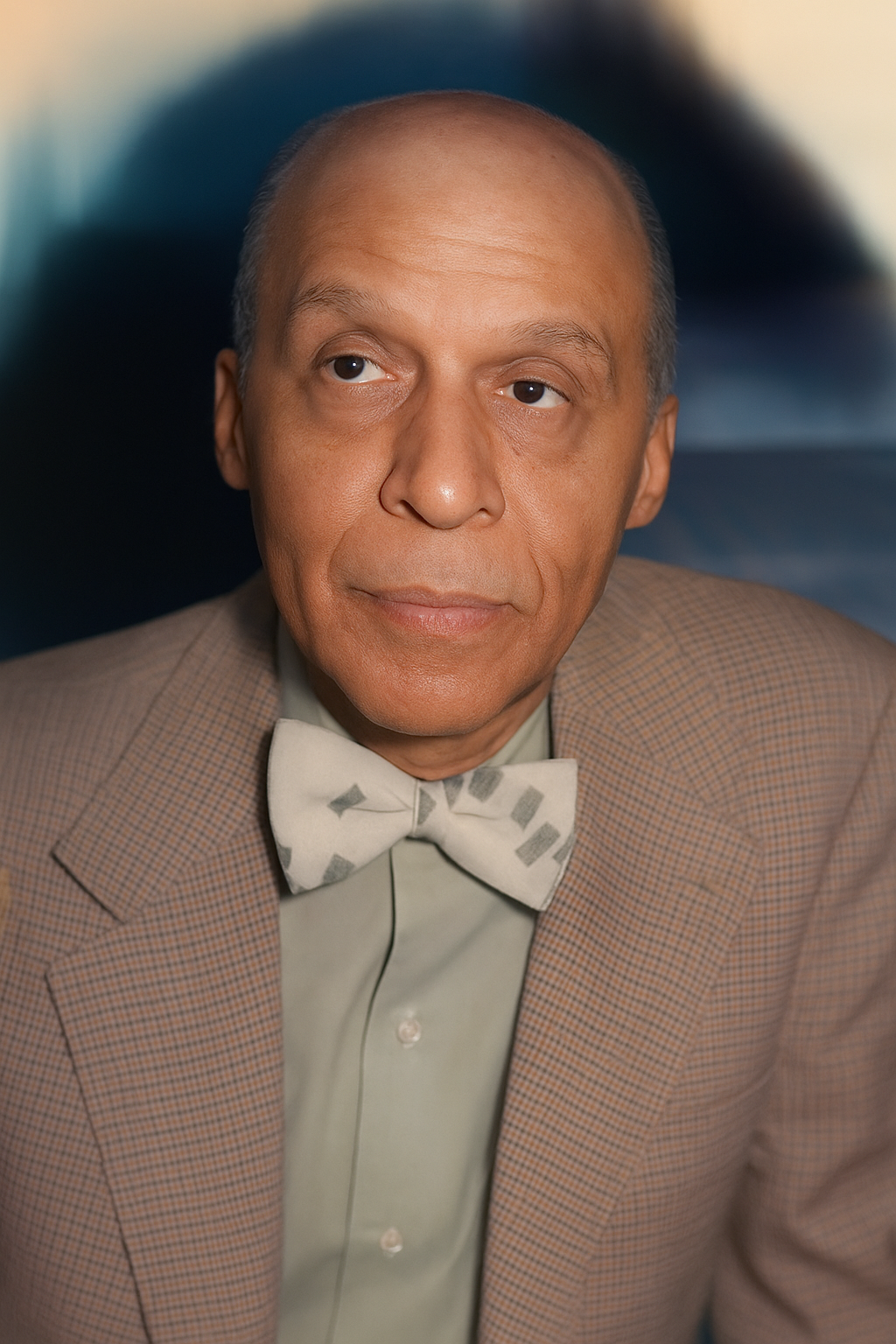
- Born: January 3, 1915; Baltimore, MD
- Died: August 26, 1988 (aged 73)
- Occupations: composer, pianist, organist, music teacher
- Employer: Howard University
- Title: Chair of Keyboard Department, Professor of Piano
- Term: 1943–1976

Thomas Henderson Kerr Jr. (January 3, 1915 – August 26, 1988) was an American classical pianist, organist, music teacher, and composer whose compositions and arrangements for piano, organ, voice, woodwind ensemble, and chorus were performed by some of the leading African American artists of his time including pianists Sylvia Olden Lee,Natalie Hinderas, William Duncan Allen Jr., and the duo-piano team, Delphin & Romain. His arrangements of Negro Spirituals have been performed and recorded by notable artists including Kathleen Battle and Jessye Norman.

Kerr was Professor of Music and Chair of the keyboard department at Howard University from 1943 – 1976. He served as the organist of the Plymouth Congregational United Church of Christ in Washington, DC. As a pianist, he performed widely in the area and was the first African American to perform a recital at the National Gallery of Art in Washington, DC.

== Early life and education ==
Thomas Kerr Jr. was born in Baltimore, Maryland in 1915 and died in 1988. He was one of three children born to Geneva Lyles and Thomas Henderson Kerr Sr. His father graduated from the pharmacy school at Howard University in 1912. He later owned a pharmacy in Baltimore and was also a part-time musician who led the “Kerr Society Orchestra,” performing at dances and popular concerts throughout the 1910s.

Thomas Jr. began playing and studying piano at an early age. He was self-taught on the organ, and, as early as fourteen, played for services at Metropolitan United Methodist Church in Baltimore. He also played piano in Baltimore's nightclubs.

He received his early musical training from W. Llewellyn Wilson at Frederick Douglass High School in Baltimore. Wilson was known for mentoring some of the most influential musicians of the later twentieth century, including Eubie Blake, Blanche Calloway, Cab Calloway, Ellis Larkins, and Mark Fax.

After high school, Kerr wanted to attend the Peabody Institute in Baltimore, but at the time, African Americans were excluded from admission. Instead, he attended Howard University, where he studied piano with Cecil Cohen (1894–1967). The next year, he transferred to the Eastman School of Music in Rochester, New York. There, he earned three degrees—in piano, music theory, and a master’s in theory—and graduated summa cum laude. At Eastman, he studied piano with Cécile Genhart (1898–1983). His master’s thesis was A Critical Survey of Printed Vocal Arrangements of Afro-American Religious Folksongs.

== Career ==
Kerr’s first position after his Eastman studies was Instructor of Piano and Organ at Knoxville College in Tennessee (1940–1943). While at Knoxville he began composing.

During the 1940s Kerr performed in a piano duo with Sylvia Olden Lee (1917–2004) on the “Black College Circuit.” In addition to the performing the standard concert repertoire for piano duo, Kerr composed a significant concert work for their tour: Didn’t My Lord Deliver Daniel?: Concert Scherzo for Two Pianos, Four Hands. According to Kerr, he needed a piece to perform with Olden Lee on the “Black College Circuit.”

He worked briefly at the Library of Congress and, in 1942, received a Julius Rosenwald Fund Fellowship for creative work in musical composition.

In 1943, Kerr returned to Howard University where he served as Professor of Piano and Chair of the Piano Department in the School of Music for thirty-three years, before retiring in 1976. At Howard University, he wrote and arranged music for important university events like the Howard Centennial and the installation of President James Nabrit Jr. He also composed for major national occasions, including the U.S. Bicentennial and the funerals of Presidents Franklin D. Roosevelt and John F. Kennedy, as well as Dr. Martin Luther King Jr.

For twenty-seven years, Kerr served as the organist and choir director at Plymouth Congregational United Church of Christ in Washington, DC, where he composed organ, choral, vocal, and ensemble works for services. His organ compositions have been performed at the Washington National Cathedral, the National Shrine of the Immaculate Conception, the Mormon Tabernacle, and in cathedrals and churches in Europe.

As a pianist, he appeared twice as a concert soloist with the National Symphony Orchestra in Washington, DC. He also performed on the Howard campus and at nearby cultural institutions including the Phillips Collection and the National Gallery of Art–where he was the first African American pianist invited to give a recital.

== Personal life ==
Thomas Kerr Jr. raised two children, Thomas Henderson Kerr III (b. 1945) and Judith Elaine Kerr (b. 1950), with his first wife, Norma McAllister Kerr (1922–1991). His second wife, Hortense Reid Kerr (1926–2002) was Professor of Piano at Howard University. She performed, catalogued, and lectured on his music and career.

Thomas H. Kerr Jr. died on August 26, 1988, as a result of being struck by an automobile. He is buried in Washington, DC, near Howard University.

== Compositional style ==
Kerr describes his own musical style as “conservative,” rejecting serialism and atonality. His music was personal, and since he wrote for community occasions or for specific performers, the writing would need to reflect those specific goals.

Usually I write what Hindemith calls, Gebrauschmusik, useful music. I write music for special occasions. I write music for myself. I wrote music when I was a performer on the piano and organ. I have since become the chief arranger for the Morgan choir. I write music for them. I've written music for Plymouth Church, and my own church, where I was organist and choir director for nearly 30 years. No looking at the sunset, nature and the babbling brook. That's not what sets me off. I write the things I need. Oft times, I can't find them, so I write them, in the style and the degree of complexity or lack of complexity I need at the time.

Jane Fitz-Fitzharris, who has studied Kerr’s compositional techniques, writes:

The musical language of Thomas Kerr, Jr. uniquely reflected the African-American experience. . . His forms and styles were classically European but at the same time he incorporated elements of African music as well as spirituals and American jazz. . . Kerr's output shows pluralistic influences. For example, his use of the ostinato technique reflects the rhythmic richness/complexity of African music; his use of formal structures such as theme and variations reflect European style; and his inclusion of the spiritual was African- American.

Many of Kerr’s piano and organ works, choral works, and vocal/piano arrangements were strongly rooted in the spiritual tradition. While many of these were written for religious occasions celebrated in his church, spirituals also formed the basis for his concert works. Among his compositions are significant concert works based on spirituals: Didn’t My Lord Deliver Daniel?: Concert Scherzo for Two Pianos, Four Hands; Easter Monday Swagger: Scherzino for Piano (based on “Walk Together, Chillen”); and Anguished American Easter, 1968 (based on “He Rose”) for organ.

The spiritual also formed the basis of compositions with political significance, such as those he wrote after the assassination of Rev. Martin Luther King Jr. or in response to events during the Civil Rights Movement of the 1960s.

Fitz-Fitzharris writes:

Kerr was a prolific composer during the years of the civil rights movement, (1956–1964), a crucial time for African-Americans. Through his creativity as a composer, he left his perception of these historical events embedded in his compositions. Kerr personally witnessed the African-American struggle for human dignity and freedom.

Kerr’s catalogue lists the following compositions around events affecting the African American community and on themes of Black liberation.

- “Untitled” (Theodore Ward) [Voice and Piano] (1942)
- Freedom Train (Langston Hughes) [Chorus, Piano, Narrator] (1947)
- Birmingham Sunday (text and music by Jack Mendelsson) arr. Kerr. Dedication: The Birmingham Four. [Voice] (1963); [Chorus] (1965)
- Jerusalem, the Golden. Dedication: R.I.P Martin Luther King [Organ] [sketch] (1968)
- Anguished American Easter, 1968. Dedication: To the Memory of Dr. Martin Luther King [Organ] (1969)
- Easter Monday Swagger: Scherzino. Dedication: For Natalie Hinderas [Piano] (1970)
- Prayer for the Soul of Martin Luther King, Jr. (Kerr) [Chorus] (1971)
- Du Bois’ Litany Responses (W.E.B. Du Bois) [SATB] (1973)
- Bicentennial Hymn (Anthem) for Black Citizens (Kerr) Dedication: For Howard University [Chorus/Brass/Tympani/Organ] (1975)

== List of works ==
Kerr’s catalogue lists over 120 works for piano, organ, voice, chorus, and chamber ensembles, none published during his lifetime. These manuscripts are preserved in Kerr’s archives at the Schomburg Center for Research in Black Culture. A renewed interest in his compositions has resulted in recent publications annotated here.

=== Voice with piano ===
- “Riding to Town” (Paul Lawrence Dunbar) Dedication: Howard University (1942) Published 1984.
- “Thou Art My Lute” (Paul Lawrence Dunbar) Dedication: To Norma [Norma McAlister Kerr] (1942, rev. 1955, 1959) Published 2002.
- “Untitled” (Theodore Ward) (1942)
- “In Memoriam” (Paul Lawrence Dunbar) (1956) Published 2002.
- “Washington, Our Own” (Kerr) Dedication: “To my parents with happy memories of a pleasant holiday” (1957)
- “Imagination Waltz” (Henry Lyles) Dedication: “for Jaxon” (1952, rev. 1960)
- “Soliloquy (Haunted / You Are There!)” (Paul Lawrence Dunbar) (1960) Published 2002. 2021
- “Prayer for the Peace of John F. Kennedy” (Text: Quebec, Sir Henry Baker, in part) (1963)
- “Centennial Ode” (alternate titles: Centennial Anthem, Centennial Hymn) (Lewis H. Fenderson) (1966)
- “Words: Let Me Speak Straight from My Heart” (Kerr) (1979)

=== Organ works ===
- Nativity Chorale-Fantasy (based on two Christmas melodies, “Rise Up, Shepherd An’ Follow” and “In dulic jubilee)” (1941)
1. Maestoso
2. Allegretto for Flutes
3. Antiphonal (Echo)
4. Contrapuntal Dialogue (Homage to J. S. Bach)
5. Aria (Pastorale)
6. Extempore Toccata – Carillon
- Arietta. Dedication: “To my Parents, Thomas H. Sr. and Geneva [Kerr]” (1951) Published 2000.
- Concert Variation on a Merry Xmas Tune: “Good King Wenceslas” (1951)
- Passacaglia and Fugue. Dedication: Easter (1955, revised as Romantic Fantasy, 1960)
- Meditation on “He Never Said a Mumblin’ Word” (1963, 1969)
- Improvisation (After Manner of a Cradle Song) (1964)
- Communion Chime Meditation on “It Came Upon the Midnight Clear” Dedication: Pearl Harbor, Dec. 7, 1965 (1965)
- Michael’s Christening (1966)
- O Perfect Love. Dedication: “For the Jan. 22nd wedding of “Florence-of-Arabia” (1966)
- Centennial Anthem (alternate titles: Centennial Hymn, Centennial Ode) (1967)
- Anguished American Easter, 1968. Dedication: “To the Memory of Dr. Martin Luther King (written on the Holy Friday after the assassination for performance at Easter Service of Plymouth Congregational Church, Washington, DC)” (1968) Published 2005.
- Thanksgiving, 1969 (Somber Variations on Handel’s “Thanks Be to Thee”) (1969)
- Suite Sebastienne. Dedication: “For Joanne Sebastian Abrams, my student” (1974)
1. “Procession of the Gargoyles” (rev. 1987) Published 2001.
2. “Miniature Antiphonal on a Pedal Point” Published 2001.
3. “Cantus”
4. “Frolicking Flutes – Homage to Vierne” Published 2004.
5. “Miniature”
6. “Fugato”
7. “Toccata – Full Organ”
8. “Trio”
9. “Allegro Barbaro”
10. “Reverie for Celestes” Published 2006.
11. “Toccata – Carillon”
- Concert Variations for Organ on a Traditional Theme (N.D.)

=== Organ with other instruments/voice ===
- Centennial Anthem (alternate titles: Centennial Hymn, Centennial Ode) [org, brass, timp] (1967)
- Academic Procession on Two Triumphant Spirituals with Fanfare for Brass and Percussion (“Jacob’s Ladder,” “Great Day”) Dedication: Dean Mark Fax [org, 5tpt, 3tbn, tba, 3timp, perc] (1967)
- Bicentennial Hymn (Anthem) for Black Citizens (Kerr) Dedication: Howard University [SATB, org, brass, timp] (1975)
- Introductory Fanfare [org, reeds, brass, orch] (N.D.)

=== Choral works ===
- “A Sailor's Song” (Paul Lawrence Dunbar) [TTBB] (1943)
- “It's All Over” [vv, SATB] (1947)
- Prayer for the Soul of Martin Luther King (Kerr) [SATB] (1971)
- Du Bois’ Litany Responses (W.E.B Du Bois) [SATB] (1973)

=== Choral Works with organ, piano, mixed instruments ===
- Freedom Train. (Langston Hughes) [SATB, vv, pf, nar] (1947)
- Eight Festive Variations on an Original Hymn (Kerr) Dedication: “To the Choir and Congregation of Plymouth Congregational Church (of the United Church of Christ) and to its esteemed minister, Rev. Theodore Ledbetter. Composed for the Dedication Service of June 13, 1965, celebrating the acquisition of a new and adequate organ for the Sanctuary” [SATB, org, congregation] (1965)
1. Cantus
2. Antiphonal
3. Fugato-Toccata
4. Trio
5. Allegro Barbaro
6. Reverie
7. Carillon
8. Reprise
- Festive Variations on an Original Hymn of Thanksgiving (Kerr) [SATB, org] (1965)
- Joy Bells of Florence (theme by Poulenc) [SATB, pf] (1965)
- Fanfares for the Nativity (Kerr) [SATB, org] (1970)
- Christmas Fanfare (Kerr) [SATB, pf,] withdrawn by the composer (1970)
- Bicentennial Hymn (Anthem) for Black Citizens (Kerr) [SATB, organ, brass, timp] (1975)

=== Piano solo ===
- Burlesque Toccata (Adventures of an Emancipated Puppet) (1937)
- Caprice Carillon. Dedication: William Duncan Allen (1940)
- Retreat of the Lame Tin Soldier (1941)
- Joy (Prelude in E-flat major) (1942)
- Temportrait I (Toccata) Dedication: Sylvia Olden Lee (1943)
- Temportrait II (Dedication) Dedication: G.L.K. (Geneva Kerr) (1943)
- Dancétudes: 7 Vignettes of Dolls and Pets. Dedication: Judy Kerr, Age 9. (1959. rev. 1961, 1963) Published 2025.
- Caprice on Two Dance Themes (Toccatina) Dedication: Natalie Hinderas. (1960)
- Easter Monday Swagger: Scherzino. Dedication: Natalie Hinderas. (1970) Published 2025.

=== Two pianos, four hands ===
- Satirical Gavotte (1938)
- Passacaglia and Concert Fugue in the Old Style (1939)
- Didn’t My Lord Deliver Daniel? Concert Scherzo for Two Pianos (1940) Published 2024.
- Es Ist Voll Brach (arr.) J.S. Bach. Dedication: Sylvia Olden Lee (1941)
- Begin the Beguine (arr.) Cole Porter. Dedication: Sylvia Olden Lee (1941) (pages missing)
- Romantic Fantasy in the Form of a Passacaglia and Fugue (1959)
- Cadenza for W. A. Mozart Concerto for Two Pianos, K365. Dedication: “Written on Mozart’s 214th birthday, January 27, 1970, for Earl and Earnest Hargrove by their teacher” (1970)

=== Piano four-hands (duet-pedagogical) ===
- Old MacDonald (Chicken Reel). Dedication: “for Pat and Michael Thornton” (1973)
- Mother “B’s” Bach. Dedication: “For the Hargrove twins – Everest (short for Never-rest because of his characteristic (and endearing) restlessness – verging on explosiveness and Oil [Earl] because of his quiet demeanor and quiet movements – there is an ancient Arling-Oriental maxim that says: Watch out for those quiet ones!” (1973)

=== Chamber music (mixed instruments) ===
- Five Festive Variations on a Merry Carol (Good King Wenceslas) [fl, ob, 2cl, bcl, hn, bsn] (1969)
- Filets of Soul (alternate title: Pastorale Elegy) [fl, ob, cl, hn, bsn] (1970) rev. Pastorale Elegy (1979)
- Sonatina [vl/fl] (N.D.)

=== Arrangements of spirituals, hymns, carols ===
- “Mah Ways Cloudy” [org] (1941)
- “Rise Up, Shepherd and Follow” [org] (1941)
- “I Will Extol Thee” [SATB] Dedication: Warner Lawson and the Howard University Choir (1942)
- “Poor Wayfaring Stranger” [SATB] Dedication: “For the Howard University Choir of ’44-’45 on the day of President’s Funeral [Franklin Delano Roosevelt]” (1945)
- “Benediction: The Lord Bless and Keep You” Dedication: “To the Howard Choir of ’48-’49” [SATB] (1948, rev. 1986 Dedication: “Happy Birthday to my Wife, Hortense (Griselda) Kerr, the East Coast’s Grand Dame of Music Education”)
- “Go Tell It on the Mountain” [SATB] (1948)
- “Plenty Good Room” [SATB] (1950)
- “I Want Jesus to Walk Wid Me” [org] (1951) Published 1951.
- “Nobody Knows the Trouble I’ve Seen” [org] (1951) Published 1951.
- “Nobody Knows the Trouble I've Seen” [pf] (1951)
- “Didn't My Lord Deliver Daniel” Dedication: “To Herr Kappellmeister Tymus Thomas (or Thomas Tymus)” [SATB] (1951, rev. 1961)
- “Didn't My Lord Deliver Daniel” [1v, pf] (1951)
- “I Want Jesus to Walk Wid Me” [1v, pf] (1951)
- “Git on Board” Dedication: Easter [1v, pf ] (1952) Published 2002.
- “I Got a Home In-a-Dat Rock” [1v, pf] (1952)
- “Great Day” Dedication: Thanksgiving, DC [1v, pf] (1953) Published 2002.
- “Wade in de Water” [1v, pf] (1953)
- “Talk About a Chile“ [SATTBB] (1954)
- “You Better Mind” [SATB] (1954)
- “Plen'y Good Room” [1v, pf] (1954)
- “I Want Jesus to Walk Wid Me” [pf ] (1956)
- “Nobody Knows” [SATB] (1957)
- “Talk About a Chile” [1v, pf] (1957) [org]
- “Christian, Dost Thou See Them” Dedication: “For the 1962 Church Birthday Celebration for Rev. Ted Ledbetter” [org] (1962, rev. 1967 Dedication: “To Aunt Bena R.I.P. Full Professor Rank – Iowa”)
- “Lead, Kindly Light” Dedication: Gunston Temple (Canaan Baptist Church) [org] (1962)
- “Sa’weet Hour of Prayer” Dedication: “For Rev. Ledbetter’s birthday, Jan. 15, 1962” [org] (1962)
- “Savior, Thy Dying Love” [org] (1962)
- “Angels from the Realms of Glory” Dedication: NY Settlement Band [org] (N.D.; rev. 1965, 1967)
- “Come, Ye Thankful People” [org] (1965)
- “What Child is This?” [org] (1965)
- “O Worship the King” [org] (1965)
- “Rejoice, O People, in the Mounting Years – Christians, Awake” [org] (1965)
- “O Come All Ye Faithful” [SATB, org] Dedication: “For Charles Fleming and the Teacher’s Alumni Chorus” (1965, rev. 1969)
- “Come, Come Ye Saints” [SATB] (1966)
- “Christ, the Lord, is Risen Today” Dedication: Easter “Centennextravaganza” Plymouth Congregational Church [org] (1966, 1967)
- “Angels We Have Heard on High” [org] (1967)
- “Come, Thou Almighty King” Dedication: “For Ted Golder” [org] (1967)
- “Lead On, O King Eternal” [org] (1967)
- “O Worship the King” [org] (1967)
- “Rejoice, Ye Pure in Heart” [org] (1967)
- “He Rose” Dedication: “For the Antiphonal Jr. and Sr. Choirs for Easter” [SATB, org] (1968)
- “Silent Night” [TTBB, org] (1968)
- “God of Our Father” [SATB, org] (1969)
- “O Come, All Ye Faithful” [org] (1969)
- “Gospel Train” [bar, stg orch] (1970, rev. 1973)
- “Oh, What a Beautiful City” [sop, bar, stg orch] (1973)
- “De Blin' Man Stood on de Road” Dedication: “For Deborah Brunson’s Recital” [1v, pf] (1973)
- “O What a Beautiful City” [sop, bar, stg orch] (1973)
- “Din' It Rain” Dedication: “ For graduating recital of countertenor, Woolyam Jones [William Jones]” [1v, pf] (1975) Published 2002.
- “Mah ways Cloudy” Dedication: “For Woodyam Jones [William Jones, Countertenor]” [1v, pf] (1975)
- “Doancha Wanna Go” [1v, pf] (N.D.)
- “Here, O My Lord” [org] (N.D.)
- “Joyful, Joyful We Adore Thee” [org] (N.D.)
- “O Zion, Haste” [org] (N.D.)

=== Other arrangements ===
- Lullaby by Johannes Brahms. [va, pf] (1944)
- Violin Sonata No. 5 in G Minor by Corelli [org] [pf] (1955)
- Cantilena – Maternal Elegy [org] (from a song to poem of Walt Whitman by Cecil Cohen arr. by T Kerr on the day of his funeral (completed 5:30 am) (1957)
- Birmingham Sunday (Jack Mendelsson) Dedication: The Birmingham Four [1v, pf] (1963) [SATB] (1965)
- Piano Concerto #3 by Sergei Prokofiev. Dedication: “A Judycial Reduction” (Orchestral reduction arranged for simplified piano.) (1965)
- “Adagio Assai” from Piano Concerto by Ravel [org] (1969)
- Concerto for 2 Klaviers by J.S. Bach. (orchestral parts) [org] (1970)
- Venetian Love Song (Herbert) [vc, pf] (N.D.)

== Discography ==
| Year | Album | Works | Performers | Label |
|---|---|---|---|---|
| 1971 | Natalie Hinderas Pianist Plays Music by Black Composers | “Scherzino, Easter Monday Swagger” | Natalie Hinderas, piano | Desto Records 7102/3 |
| 1991 | Spirituals in Concert | “Great Day” “Oh, What a Beautiful City” | Jessye Norman and Kathleen Battle, sopranos, James Levine, conductor | DGG |
| 1992 | A Diversity of Riches: Multi-Ethnic Organ Music by 20th-Century American Composers | “Anguished American Easter, 1968” | Herndon Spillman, organ | Titanic |
| 1998 | Songs of Illumination | “Git on Board” | Louise Toppin, soprano and Howard Watkins, piano | Centaur Records |
| 2006 | Spirituals | “Great Day” | Jessye Norman, soprano and Dalton Baldwin, piano | Phillips Classics |
| 2007 | Piano Music by African American Composers | “Scherzino, Easter Monday Swagger” | Natalie Hinderas, piano | New World Records NWCR629 (reissue of 1971 Desto LP) |
| 2011 | How Sweet the Sound | “Git on Board” | Darryl Taylor, countertenor and Brent McMunn, piano | Albany Records |
| 2021 | Dreams of a New Day: Songs by Black Composers | “Riding to Town” | Will Liverman, baritone and Paul Sánchez, piano | Cedille Records |
| 2022 | Five By Four | “Concert Scherzo: Didn’t My Lord Deliver Daniel?” | Nyaho/Garcia Piano Duo (William Chapman Nyaho and Susanna Garcia, duo pianists) | MSR Classics MS1753 |
| 2023 | Witness | “Great Day” | Limmie Pulliam, tenor and Mark Markham, piano | Pulliam Music Group LLC. |

== Sources ==
- Thomas Henderson Kerr Jr. Papers (Sc MG 763). Schomburg Center for Research in Black Culture. Manuscripts, Archives and Rare Books Division of the New York Public Library.
- Fitz-Fitzharris, Jane. “Compositional Techniques in Thomas Kerr, Jr.’s ‘Anguished American Easter, 1968’ and Their Application to the Theme of African-American Theology.” DMA diss., Louisiana State University, 2006.
- Garcia, Susanna. “The Distinctive Voice of Thomas H. Kerr.” Piano Magazine, spring 2025; vol. 17, no 1. pp. 9–19.
- Garcia, Susanna and William Chapman Nyaho. 2024. "Preface" In: Kerr, Thomas Henderson, Jr. Didn’t My Lord Deliver Daniel? Concert Scherzo for Two Pianos. Edited by Susanna Garcia and William Chapman Nyaho, The Frances Clark Center Piano Education Press, pp. 4–15.
- Garcia, Susanna and William Chapman Nyaho. 2025. "Preface" In: Kerr, Thomas Henderson, Jr. Dancétudes: 7 Vignettes of Dolls and Pets. Edited by Susanna Garcia and William Chapman Nyaho, The Frances Clark Center Piano Education Press, pp. 4–25.
- Garcia, Susanna and William Chapman Nyaho. 2025. "Preface" In: Kerr, Thomas Henderson, Jr. Easter Monday Swagger: Scherzino for Piano. Edited by Susanna Garcia and William Chapman Nyaho, The Frances Clark Center Piano Education Press, pp. 4–20.
- Garcia, William Burres. “Church Music by Black Composers: A Bibliography of Choral Music.” The Black Perspective in Music, vol. 2, no. 2, 1974, pp. 145–57. JSTOR.
- Harrell, Paula D. Organ literature of twentieth-century black composers: An annotated bibliography, The University of North Carolina at Greensboro, United States – North Carolina, 1992. ProQuest.
- Hobson, Constance Tibbs, and Cynthia A. Reid. A Catalogue of the Compositions and Arrangements of Thomas Henderson Kerr, Jr. (1915–1988) 2005. Thomas Henderson Kerr Jr. Papers (Sc MG 763). Box 5, Folder 1. Schomburg Center for Research in Black Culture. Manuscripts, Archives and Rare Books Division of the New York Public Library.
- Kerr, Hortense R., and Marva Cooper. “Selected Piano Music of Thomas H. Kerr, Jr.” Intercultural Musicology 4, No. 1. (April 2000). Archived from the original.
- Kerr, Thomas H., Jr. A Critical Survey of Printed Vocal Arrangements of Afro-American Religious Folk Songs. June 1939. MM Thesis, Eastman School of Music.
- de Lerma, Dominique-Rene. Liner notes for “Natalie Hinderas, Piano Music by African American Composers,” 2007, New World Records NWCR629.
- Patterson, Willis. “The African-American Art Song: A Musical Means for Special Teaching and Learning.” Black Music Research Journal, vol. 16, no. 2, 1996, pp. 303–10. JSTOR.
- Royal, Guericke C. Selected Works of Composers Associated with Howard University, University of Maryland, College Park, United States – Maryland, 2018. ProQuest.
- Thomas, Sarah. A History of Exclusion: Racial Injustice at the Peabody Institute. Johns Hopkins University Sheridan Libraries (2019).
- White, Evelyn Davidson. Choral Music by African-American Composers: An Annotated Bibliography. Scarecrow Press, April 1996.
