= Carlotta Freeman =

- Born: Carlotta Thomas c. 1877; Charleston, South Carolina, United States
- Died: June 11, 1954 (aged 77); New York, New York, United States
- Occupation: actor
- Years active: 1905–1954
- Spouse: H. Lawrence Freeman

Carlotta Freeman (c. 1877 – June 11, 1954) was an American stage actress. She was one of the first African American women in the legitimate theatre.

== Biography ==
Born Carlotta Thomas, she made her professional acting debut in 1905 and her first appearance on the New York stage in 1912. In 1915, she became one of the original members of the Anita Bush Stock Company (later called the Lafayette Players), one of the first black repertory theatre companies.

She also starred in several operettas written by her husband, H. Lawrence Freeman, such as Voodoo which premiered in 1928.

She died on June 11, 1954, in New York City, just a few months after her husband, survived by her son, Valdo Lee Freeman, who also had a career in music.
