= Williametta Spencer =

American composer (1927–2026)

Williametta Spencer (August 15, 1927 – March 29, 2026) was an American composer, musicologist and teacher who played harpsichord, organ, and piano. She is best known for her award-winning choral work At the Round Earth’s Imagined Corners.

== Life and career ==
Spencer was born in Marion, Illinois on August 15, 1927, to Viva Jewell and Samuel Joseph Spencer. The family moved to Paducah, Kentucky, where her father was a minister of music at several different Baptist churches during her childhood. Spencer earned a B.A. at Whittier College and a M.Mus. and Ph.D. at the University of Southern California. Her dissertation was entitled The Influence and Stylistic Heritage of André Caplet. In 1953, she received a Fulbright scholarship to study in Paris. Her teachers included Pauline Alderman, Tony Aubin, Alfred Cortot, Ingolf Dahl, Ernst Kanitz, and Halsey Stevens.

She won several awards, including the Southern California Vocal Association National Composition Award for At the Round Earth’s Imagined Corners; Alumni Achievement Awards from Whittier College in 1995 and 2008; and the Amy Beach Award for her orchestral overture. I Cantori commissioned and premiered her choral work, And the White Rose is a Dove. Spencer was a member of Mu Phi Epsilon and the International Alliance for Women in Music.

Spencer's works have been published by Associated Music Publishers Inc., Mark Foster Music Co., Orpheus Publications, Shawnee Press, and Western International Music Co.

Spencer died on March 29, 2026, at the age of 98.

== Article ==
- The Relationship Between André Caplet and Claude Debussy (The Musical Quarterly, Volume LXVI, Issue 1, January 1980, Pages 112–131)

== Chamber ==
- Adagio and Rondo (oboe and piano)
- Sonatina for Clarinet and Piano
- Sonata for Trombone and Piano
- String Quartet
- Suite (flute and piano)
- Trio for Brass Instruments

== Orchestra ==
- Overture
- Passacaglia and Double Fugue (string orchestra)

== Organ ==
- Improvisation and Meditation on “Gott sei gelobet”

== Vocal ==
- And the White Rose is a Dove (choir)
- As I Rode Out This Enders NIght (a cappella choir)
- As I Sat Under a Sycamore Tree (a cappella choir)
- At the Round Earth’s Imagined Corners (choir; text by John Donne)
- Bright Cap and Streamers (choir)
- Cantate Domino
- Four Madrigals (text by James Joyce)
- “Give Me the Splendid Silent Sun” (text by Walt Whitman)
- Make We Joy: A Cantata for Christmastide in a Medieval Atmosphere
- Missa Brevis
- Nova, Nova, Ave Fit Ex Eva (a cappella choir)
- Three Songs (text by William Shakespeare; flute, oboe, 2 clarinets, bassoon, and voice)
- Two Christmas Madrigals (a cappella choir)
- Winter Has Lasted Too Long (voice, clarinet, and piano)
