= William Berwald =

American composer and conductor

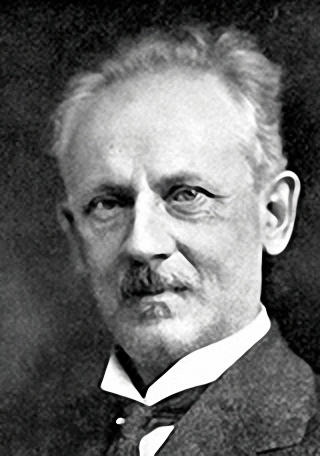
- Born: William Henry Berwald; December 26, 1864; Schwerin, Mecklenburg
- Died: May 8, 1948 (aged 83); Loma Linda, California
- Occupation: Composer

William Henry Berwald (1864–1948) was an American composer and conductor of German origin. He published some 400 compositions and won numerous prizes, including the Manuscript Music Society in 1901, the Clemson Gold Medal in 1913, the Prosser Etude prize in 1915, and the Estey Organ Prize in 1928. Among his works are pedagogical pieces for piano.

== Biography ==
Born in Schwerin, Mecklenburg on December 26, 1864, Berwald studied counterpoint with Josef Rheinberger. He worked as a teacher in Stuttgart before emigrating to the United States. He taught at Syracuse University for 52 years, and his papers are held in the school's archives. From 1922 to 1925 he served as conductor of the Syracuse Symphony Orchestra. He died in Loma Linda, California on May 8, 1948. One of his notable pupils was Halsey Stevens.

== See also ==
- List of music students by teacher: A to B § William Berwald
