= Paul Cooper (composer) =

Paul Cooper (May 19, 1926; Victoria, Illinois – April 4, 1996; Houston, Texas) was an American composer and teacher of classical music.

Born in Victoria, Illinois, he received degrees from the University of Southern California, where his teachers included Ernest Kanitz, Halsey Stevens, and Roger Sessions. He also studied with Nadia Boulanger as a Fulbright Fellow from 1953-1954.

Cooper taught at the University of Michigan School of Music and the University of Cincinnati College Conservatory of Music prior to joining the Rice University Shepherd School of Music as a founding member in 1974. He remained there until his death in 1996, at which time he held the Lynette S. Autrey Endowed Chair and was the Composer-in-Residence at the Shepherd School.

In addition to a Fulbright, he was the recipient of a Guggenheim Fellowship as well as grants from the National Endowment for the Arts, the National Academy and Institute of Arts and Letters, and from the Ford, Rockefeller, and Rackham Foundations. Some of his notable students include Gabriela Lena Frank, Svend Nielsen, and Ellsworth Milburn. See: List of music students by teacher: C to F#Paul Cooper.

While Cooper experimented with compositional techniques popular during the middle of the twentieth century, including serialism and aleatory, much of his music follows traditional structures, with numerous works in "absolute (established) forms," including six string quartets, numerous concertos (including two for violin, one for saxophone, and one for flute), and six symphonies. Ross Lee Finney characterized Cooper's music as having "a deep emotional motivation and at the same time a simplicity and clarity that comes from his mastery of craft."

== Selected works ==
- Symphonies
  - Symphony no. 1, 1966
  - Symphony no. 2 "Antiphons," 1971
  - Symphony no. 3 "Lamentations," 1971
  - Symphony no. 4 "Landscape," 1973-75
  - Symphony no. 5, 1982–83
  - Symphony no. 6 "In Memoriam," 1987
- Concertos
  - Violin Concerto No. 1, 1967
  - Descants, for Viola and Orchestra, 1975
  - Cello Concerto, 1977
  - Violin Concerto No. 2, 1980–82
  - Flute Concerto, 1981–82
  - Organ Concerto, 1982
  - Saxophone Concerto, 1982
  - Double Concerto for Violin, Viola and Orchestra, 1987
- Chamber music
  - Piano Quintet, 1995
  - String Quartet No. 1, 1952 (rev. 1978)
  - String Quartet No. 2, 1954 (rev. 1979)
  - String Quartet No. 3, 1959
  - String Quartet No. 4, 1964
  - String Quartet No. 5, 1973
  - String Quartet No. 6, 1977
  - Sonata for Viola and Piano, 1961
  - Sonata for Violin and Piano, 1962
  - Sonata No. 1 for Cello and Piano, 1963
  - Sonata for Double Bass and Piano, 1964
  - Sonata for Flute and Piano, 1964
  - Sonata No. 2 for Cello and Piano, 1965

== Books ==
- Cooper, Paul. Dimensions of SIght Singing: An Anthology. New York: Longman. 1981.
- Cooper, Paul. Perspectives in Music Theory: An Historical-Analytical Approach. New York: Dodd Mead. 1973.
