= Ernest Kanitz =

Austrian-American composer

- Born: Ernst Kanitz; Vienna, Austria-Hungary
- Died: April 7, 1978 (aged 83) California , United States
- Genres: Classical music
- Occupations: composer and music pedagogue
- Instrument: Piano

Ernest Kanitz (born Ernst Kanitz; 9 April 1894 – 7 April 1978) was an Austrian-American composer and pedagogue.

== Biography ==
Kanitz was born in Vienna, Austria-Hungary on 9 April 1894. Born Ernst, he changed his name to Ernest in order to differentiate himself from a Viennese concert manager of the same name. He studied law at the University of Vienna concurrently pursuing piano lessons and studying theory and music composition. He graduated in 1918. He studied with Richard Heuberger for two years between 1912 and 1914 and Franz Schreker for six years from 1914. Schreker conducted the first performance of his Lustige Ouvertüre (Cheerful Overture) in the autumn of 1918. Following the performance, the overture was described as "a witty, pretty composition" and referred to as his best-known work in Musikblätter des Anbruch (1921).

In 1921, he received initial exposure through the première under Alexander von Zemlinsky of his oratorio Das Hohelied (The Song of Songs). This enabled him to take a professorship which commenced in 1922 at the Neues Konservatorium where he taught analysis, theory and composition for 16 years.

On 4 February 1926, Austrian conductor Clemens Krauss gave the successful première of Kanitz's Four Orchestral Songs.

He founded the Vienna Women's Chorus in 1930 which he conducted until 1938. In forming the chorus it was his objective to present contemporary choral music, including works by Stravinsky, Honegger, and Kodály, to audiences in European cities, such as Brno, Budapest, Paris and Vienna.

Kanitz was of Jewish ancestry, and although he had converted to Christianity in 1914, he was still forced to leave Austria following its annexation by the Nazis in 1938. After a short stay in New York, Kanitz and his wife Gertrude settled in Rock Hill, South Carolina, where he found a teaching position. After her early death from cancer, Kanitz relocated in California and established a successful teaching career at the University of Southern California. He retired from USC in 1960, but continued to compose, and his works were premièred by leading US orchestras, such as the Philadelphia Orchestra and the Los Angeles Philharmonic.

Kanitz died in Menlo Park, California on 7 April 1978. After his death, his music was largely forgotten and few recordings of it have been available. In 2025, an album of chamber works, including his Violin Sonata op. 10 (1921) and String Quartet (1945), was released by Chandos Records.

== Teaching legacy ==
Your pupils—those in schools as well as your private pupils—love contemporary music; the good original, individual music of the type outlined in the first part of this talk ... These young people are the music performers, music teachers, and, the majority of them, the music public of the future. They should be given more music of the best living composers. Let them have a fair amount of the music of standard composers, but let a still greater amount of what you teach them and coach with them be interesting contemporary music! In undertaking this not-always-easy job, you will render a wonderful service to our country and to the culture of our time in general. — Ernest Kanitz Today's Music Teachers and Today's Music (1950)

From 1945, Kanitz taught at the faculty of the University of Southern California for 14 years. Among his more notable students were Houston Bright, Paul Cooper, Howard L. Quilling, Karl Schiske and Williametta Spencer, television composer Don B. Ray, musical theorist Leon Dallin and American composer Benjamin Lees (1924–2010). He taught at Marymount College for four years commencing in 1960. After his teaching term concluded at the Marymount College in Palos Verdes, California in 1964, Kanitz concentrated on teaching composition privately.

He wrote a manual on counterpoint: A Counterpoint Workbook : Fundamental Techniques of Polyphonic Music Writing which was written and copyrighted in 1947 and published in Los Angeles a year later.

== Selected works ==
- 1918 – Lustige Ouvertüre (Cheerful Overture)
- 1920 – Das Hohelied (The Song of Songs)
- 1921 – Sonata, violin and piano Op.10
- 1923-9 – Der Wunder-Wilan, opera
- 1926 – Vier Gesänge (Four Songs), soprano and orchestra Op. 11
- 1928 – Cyrano de Bergerac, opera
- 1931 – Zeitmusik (Music of Our Time) for baritone solo
- 1934 – Evening Festival for Radio, for soprano solo, two guitars, two pianos and orchestra
- 1936 – Ballet Music for women's chorus and orchestra
- 1936 – Gotthelf Schlicht, cantata for soloist, mixed choir and orchestra
- 1938 – Concertino for theremin and orchestra
- 1939 – God's Minute, SATB choir with piano
- 1945 – String Quartet
- 1950 – Notturno for flute, violin and viola
- 1953 – Kumana, opera in one act
- 1956 – Room No. 12, opera
- 1957 – Royal Auction, opera in one act
- 1959 – The Lucky Dollar, chamber opera
- 1960 – Perpetual, chamber opera
- 1962 – Visions at Twilight for flute, piano, strings and chorus
- 1964 – Visions of Midnight, opera-cantata
- 1964 – Concerto for bassoon and orchestra
- 1970 – Little Concerto for alto saxophone solo
- 1974 – Sinfonietta da Camera for violin, sax, piano or celesta and percussion
