= Hale Smith =

Pioneering Black Modernist composer

- Born: Hale Smith Jr. June 29, 1925; Cleveland, Ohio, U.S.
- Died: November 24, 2009 (aged 84); Freeport, New York, U.S.
- Education: Cleveland Institute of Music (BM, MM)
- Musical career
- Genres: Jazz, classical
- Occupations: Musician, composer, arranger
- Instrument: Piano
- Years active: 1939–2000

Hale Smith (June 29, 1925 – November 24, 2009) was an American composer, arranger, and pianist.

== Biography ==
Born in Cleveland, Ohio, he learned piano at an early age and played mellophone in the high school band. As a teenager, he played jazz piano in local nightclubs. When he was sixteen, he met Duke Ellington, who commented on his compositions.

In the early 1940s he was drafted and worked for the U.S. Army as an arranger for shows at camps in Georgia and Florida. After the Army he studied classical music and composition at the Cleveland Institute of Music and received bachelor's and master's degrees. His composition Four Songs won the first student composer award given by BMI. During the late 1950s he moved to New York City and was employed as an editor at publishing companies. He worked as a jazz pianist and arranger with Eric Dolphy, Dizzy Gillespie, Ahmad Jamal, Melba Liston, Oliver Nelson, and Randy Weston and wrote incidental music for television, radio, and theater. With Chico Hamilton he wrote music for the movie Mr. Ricco (1975).

In 1948, he married Juanita Hancock. He has a daughter, Robin, who resides in Manhattan, and three sons: Michael from Freeport, Eric from York, PA, and Marcel from Harpursville, NY. Additionally, he has three grandchildren.

His compositions include The Valley Wind (1952), In Memoriam, Beryl Rubinstein (1953), Sonata for Cello and Piano (1955), Contours for Orchestra (1961), Faces of Jazz (1965), Evocation (1966), Ritual and Incantation (1974), Innerflexions (1977), Toussaint L'Ouverture (1979), Solemn Music (1979), Three Patterson Lyrics (1985), and Dialogues and Commentaries (1991) He wrote music for band, choir, orchestra, jazz groups, chamber ensembles, duos, and solo performance.

Smith was a teacher at C.W. Post campus of Long Island University in Brookville and the University of Connecticut in Storrs. He died at the age of 84 on November 24, 2009, due to a stroke. Among his notable students was Talib Rasul Hakim.

== Award and honors ==
- Cleveland Art Prize in Music, 1973
- Outstanding Achievement Award, National Association for the Study and Performance of African American Music, 1982
- Honorary doctorate, Cleveland Institute of Music, 1988
- Composer's Recording Award, American Academy of Arts and Letters, 1988
- Letter of Distinction, American Music Center, 2001
- Hale Smith Day, Freeport, New York, 2010

== Compositions ==
- Orchestral Set (1952)
- Four Songs for Medium Voice (1952)
- The Valley Wind (1952)
- In Memoriam – Beryl Rubinstein (1953)
- Sonata for Violoncello and Piano (1955)
- Two Love Songs of John Donne (1958)
- Feathers (1960)
- Contours for Orchestra (1961)
- Take a Chance: An Aleatoric Episode (1964)
- By Yearning and by Beautiful (1964)
- Evocation (1966)
- Expansions (1967)
- Music for Harp and Chamber Orchestra (1967)
- Trinal Dance (1968)
- I Love Music (c. 1970) – recorded by Betty Carter, Joe Lovano,
- Beyond the Rim of Day (1970)
- Anticipations, Introspections and Reflections for Piano Solo (1971)
- Exchanges (1972)
- Somersault: A Twelve Tone Adventure (1974)
- Ritual and Incantation (1974)
- Variations for Six Players (1975)
- Innerflexions (1977)
- Solemn Music (1979)
- Toussaint L'Ouverture, 1803 (1979)
- Meditations in Passage (1982)
- Variations a' Due for saxophone and cello (1984, rev.1995), recorded by Dr. Ira Wiggins and Dr. Timothy Holley
- March and Fanfare for an Elegant Lady (1986)
- Mirrors: Rondo-Variations for Two Pianos (1988, 1990). Commissioned by the Delphin & Romain Piano Duo
- Dialogues & Commentaries (1990–91)
- Recitative and Aria (1995)
