= Voodoo (opera) =

Voodoo is an opera in three acts with music and libretto by Harry Lawrence Freeman. A product of the Harlem Renaissance, it was first performed with piano accompaniment as a radio broadcast on May 20, 1928. The first staged performance with orchestra took place on September 10, 1928, at the Palm Garden (a temporary name for the 52nd Street Theatre) in New York City.

== History ==
Freeman was a talented African-American musician, becoming assistant church organist at age 10. A seminal moment in his life was seeing Richard Wagner's opera Tannhäuser. In 1891, at age 18, he completed his first opera. He continued to compose numerous operas during much of his life.

In several articles concerning Voodoo, the New York Amsterdam News varied its reportage of the time Freeman had spent composing the opera. Initially, the paper said "Although Professor Freeman has been prepared for years for the opportunity to present the negro in opera he has had to bide his time." After the opera had closed, the paper said that Freeman had been working on the opera for two years. The paper corrected itself later when it reported that he had completed the opera in 1914. (The finding aid for Freeman's papers at Columbia University indicates a vocal score dated 1912.)

== Synopsis ==
Voodoo is set in Louisiana during the Reconstruction Era. Cleota, a house servant, is in love with Mando, a plantation overseer on the plantation where they live. The voodoo queen, Lolo, is jealous and, seeing Cleota as a rival, tries to put her out of the way. A voodoo ceremony takes place during which Lolo and her associate, Fojo, distribute amulets and charms to participants, then retreat to a glen to invoke the snake-god. Cleota is about to be put to death but is rescued by Mando and Chloe (Lolo's mother). Another attempt by Lolo to subdue Cleota results in the queen being shot.

The New York Herald Tribune reported that the opera was to illustrate "typical Negro life in the days of slavery, while the music includes spirituals, chants, arias, tangoes and other dances, among these a ritualistic voodoo ceremony."

== Productions ==
The opera was first presented as a radio broadcast with piano accompaniment (played by Freeman) on May 20, 1928, over station WGBS. The cast included Doris Trotman, soprano; Carlotta Freeman, soprano; Ray Yates, tenor; Otto Bohanan, baritone.

A month later, Valdo Freeman, the composer's son and a baritone, sang excerpts from Voodoo as well as another of his father's operas, Plantation, during a radio recital also broadcast on WGBS on June 25, 1928.

Notices prior to the production's staged premiere mentioned a "company of over fifty people." Advertisements also indicated the company was to include fifty people, although this figure was reduced to thirty in later notices.

The "Negro jazz grand opera" (as it was called by the New York Amsterdam News) had its first staged performance at the "Palm Garden" (apparently a temporary name for the 52nd Street Theatre) on September 10, 1928. Freeman conducted an orchestra of twenty-one musicians. The review in the New York Herald Tribune said the presentation was "offered" by his son Valdo Freeman. One review referred to the producing company as the "Negro Opera Company Inc."

Costumes were supplied by Chrisdie & Carlotta, and F. Berner supplied the wigs. The executive staff included Robert Eichenberg, Leon Williams, Esther Thompson, Octavia Smith, Philip Williams, William Thompson, Grace Abrams, and Walter Mattis.

Voodoo was scheduled to run for a week with a matinée on Saturday. Apparently it had to close early for lack of funding.

The score was never published. The manuscript resides in the Rare Book & Manuscript Library of Columbia University.

The first production of Voodoo since 1928 took place June 26–27, 2015 at Miller Theatre by the Harlem Opera Theatre, Morningside Opera, and the Harlem Chamber Players. It was conducted by Gregory Hopkins.

== Casts ==
Role	Voice type	First performance (on radio), May 20, 1928 Accompanist: Harry Lawrence Freeman	Premiere stage performance cast, September 10, 1928 Conductor: Harry Lawrence Freeman
Cleota	soprano	Doris Trotman	Doris Trotman
Lolo	soprano	Carlotta Freeman	Carlotta Freeman
Mando	tenor	Ray Yates	Ray Yates
	baritone	Otto Bohanan	Valdo Freeman
	baritone		Thomas R. Hall
			Marie Woodby
	bass		William H. Holland
			Joseph Northern
			Rosetta Jones
dancer			Ollie Burgoyne

The alternate cast for the staged presentation included Rosetta Jones, Cordelia Paterson, Luther Lamont, Blanche Smith, John H. Eckles, Leo C. Evans, and Harold Bryant. Named participants also included the dancer Ollie Burgoyne, who had recently performed at the Folies Bergère in Paris.

== Response ==
Calling it (incorrectly) the first opera composed, produced, and sung by African Americans, the New York Herald Tribune's detailed review heralded the production, calling it "another step toward establishing a distinct negro culture in this country." The review went on to note production limitations brought about due to lack of sufficient funding. The composer's style came in for harder criticism, with the reviewer calling his music "not original" since it was too dependent on external influences such as spirituals and Tin Pan Alley songs. But the same reviewer said the opening dance of the second act was most effective, and called the third act the most original, showing off the composer's "inspired creative powers" with "effectively barbaric moments the music accompanying the voodoo ceremony" and "various elements making a conglomerate rather than a homogeneous, well-fused score." Nevertheless, the combination of nineteenth-century Italian-French style arias with Freeman's modernistic trends created an odd juxtaposition.

In general, the reviewer found the plot complex but believable, while the libretto was generally good but at times "a trifle lavish." Of the singers, the review noted Doris Trotman's "rich soprano" while Carlotta Freeman was good but with "weak high notes." While calling Valdo Freeman and Thomas R. Hall "the best voices of the evening," the review opined that "the performance was earnest rather than polished."

Writing in the Hartford Courant, Pierre Key reported that the production was "feeble" and "amateurish." But his estimation of the score was more positive: "A degree of rhythmic invention and facility for instrumental color are excellences this composer has." The New York Times also felt that the "production [was] amateur in spirit." The unnamed reviewer noted, "The composer utilizes themes from spirituals, Southern melodies, and jazz rhythms which, combined with traditional Italian operatic forms, produce a curiously naive mélange of varied styles."

Writing for the Chicago Tribune, Alfred Frankenstein found the book formless (which he admitted was true of many operas) with most of the action taking place in the opera's final act, making the first two acts seem inconsequential. He criticized the use of language among the characters, the leads singing in proper English while subsidiary characters sang in "Negro dialect." He particularly condemned archaic-sounding language, such as the line "Ah, could I to thy for [my] life but restore." Frankenstein then continued his review by describing the stresses carried by African-Americans who must navigate a combination of racial inferiority and racial pride. He contended that these opposing forces can be heard in Voodoo as one hears the influences of Edward MacDowell, Richard Wagner, and Harry Burleigh as well as spirituals, although Freeman's musical expression was hampered by the poor libretto. Frankenstein concludes on a condescending note recommending that Freeman read the music history of various nationalities as a means of raising African-Americans' position within musical art.

The African-American press had more understanding words to say about the opera. The New York Amsterdam News highlighted how Freeman had to pay for the production with his own funding and questioned why the African-American community wasn't more supportive. A letter from a reader also questioned why more African-Americans did not attend the opera.

Echoing the uneven musical style in other reviews, the Baltimore Afro-American noted that "the opera is not perfect." Its dependence on familiar styles resulted in the "impression of lacking a genuine authenticity and that it depends too much on outside influences to be completely Negro."

The appearance of Voodoo inspired other African-American operas to surface. Just a month after the opera's premiere, Billboard announced a presentation of Deep Harlem, "another negro opera," to be produced by actor/director Earl Dancer.
