= Anna Gardner Goodwin =

American composer

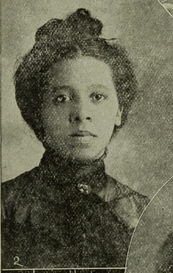
- Anna Gardner Goodwin, in a 1902 publication.

Background information
- Born: October 1874; Augusta, Georgia
- Died: 1959

Anna Gardner Goodwin (October 1874 – 1959) was a Black American composer of classical music.

== Early life ==
Anna Gardner was born in Augusta, Georgia, in 1874 to Daniel and Anna Gardner. Daniel Gardner was remembered as "the March King of Augusta", a cornet player who ran a Sunday afternoon concert series for Black Augustans. "To dance and watch my father blow his cornet with such enthusiasm created within me a desire to make music," Anna Gardner Goodwin wrote.

== Personal life and legacy ==
In 1895, Anna Gardner married the Rev. George A. Goodwin, a professor of theology at Morehouse College, Atlanta, Georgia. Together they had four children: a son, George Jr., and three daughters: Janie, Anna, and Eunice. In summer 1913, Mrs. Goodwin earned a scholarship to the University of Pennsylvania to study the “method and supervision of public-school [sic] music” in the summer of 1913. Sadly, Rev. Goodwin passed away in 1914. Thereafter, in 1917, she and her sister, Janie Gardner Burruss (1876-1924), also a widow, moved to Chicago, Illinois.

Her granddaughter, Jane Alexander Robinson, became one of the founders of the Michigan Association of Black Psychologists. Jane's grandsons, David E. Robinson III and Richard Robinson, both became professional musicians and composers. Anna Gardner Goodwin's great-grandson, Richard Robinson, became a full member of the Detroit Symphony Orchestra in 1989. In 2010, he was a Kresge Arts Fellow.

Anna Gardner Goodwin passed away in 1959 at age 85. Her papers, including a handwritten biography, are archived at the Center for Black Music Research, Columbia College Chicago, Chicago, Illinois.

== Career ==
Goodwin wrote and taught music for much of her adult life. During her married life, Goodwin assisted her husband by playing and leading music at Morehouse College and accompanying the school's glee club. She also served as Faculty at Paine College in August, Georgia from 1917-1918, teaching Vocal Music. In the 1930s, Goodwin worked as assistant house director of the Chicago, Ill., YWCA.

Two compositions are of note, including Goodwin's last composition, "Freedom to All March", written to commemorate the 1951 race riot in Cicero, Illinois, and "Cuba Libre March" (1898), which was included in Black Women Composers: A Century of Piano Music, 1893-1990 (1992). "Freedom to March" was performed by the Cicero Bank in 1956.

== Compositions ==
- I Will Follow Jesus (1906)
- Do Not Touch the Wine Cup (1906)
- Jesus Don’t Pass Me By (1906)
- Praise the Lord (1906)
- Tell the Story Everywhere (1906)
- Willing Workers (1906)
- Adalene (1909)
- I’m Lonely Just for You (1934)
- We've Got to Win this War (1943)
- Freedom for All (1956)
- The House by the Side of the Road (undated)
- Rogena Verses and F-I-N-A-LE Waltz and Dance (undated, unfinished)
