= Delphin & Romain =

American classical piano duo

- Occupation: Duo Pianists
- Years active: 1977–1995
- Members: Wilfred Delphin; Edwin Romain

Delphin & Romain was an American classical piano duo formed by pianists Wilfred Delphin and Edwin Romain. Active from 1977 to 1995, the duo was among the first African American piano duos to perform on the international professional concert circuit. Delphin & Romain performed widely throughout the United States as well as in South America, Europe, and Asia. Its repertoire included standard works for piano duo alongside music by African American and other Black composers. In addition to appearing in major concert venues, the duo also performed in smaller communities, sometimes transporting their own pianos to facilitate performances.

Delphin & Romain has been credited with helping expand opportunities for Black classical pianists in the United States beginning in the late 1970s and continuing throughout its career, which ended shortly before the death of Edwin Romain in 1995.

== Education and career ==
Wilfred Delphin (b. 1949) and Edwin Romain (1950–1995) met as undergraduate students at Xavier University of Louisiana in New Orleans in 1968. They later pursued graduate studies at Southern Illinois University Carbondale (SIUC) and earned doctoral degrees from the University of Southern Mississippi.

Delphin & Romain made its professional debut in 1977 at Carnegie Hall, appearing as soloists with the Symphony of the New World in Francis Poulenc's Concerto in D minor for Two Pianos. Writing in The New York Times, John Rockwell praised the debut performance as "fluent, neatly meshed, well‐balanced . . . consistently musical."

The duo later appeared as soloists with orchestras including the New York Philharmonic, Minnesota Orchestra, Cleveland Orchestra, Atlanta Symphony Orchestra, and New Orleans Philharmonic Symphony.

During the late 1970s and 1980s the duo maintained an active performing career while also holding academic appointments.

In 1979 Delphin & Romain moved to Charleston, South Carolina, where the pianists were appointed Artists-in-Residence at the College of Charleston. During their years in Charleston, they were active in the city's musical life, including appearances connected with the Spoleto Festival USA and other cultural events in the area.

In 1988 Delphin & Romain accepted teaching positions on the faculty at Southern Illinois University Carbondale.

== Selected performances ==
The duo appeared at major concert venues and festivals in the United States and internationally. Selected performances include:

- Carnegie Hall debut, October 16, 1977 – performed Francis Poulenc's Concerto in D minor for Two Pianos with the Symphony of the New World.
- National Black Music Colloquium, January 11, 1980. John F. Kennedy Center for the Performing Arts, Washington, D.C.
- White House performance, February 20, 1980, during a state dinner honoring Kenyan president Daniel arap Moi.
- New York Philharmonic, December 29–30, 1981, conducted by Zubin Mehta, performing Mendelssohn's Concerto for Two Pianos in E major.
- Carnegie Hall recital, March 21, 1982.

== Repertoire ==
In addition to performing the standard classical two-piano repertoire, Delphin & Romain promoted works by African American and other Black composers. The duo's programs included music by composers such as Thomas H. Kerr Jr. (1915–1988), Roque Jacinto Cordero (1917–2008), George Walker (1922–2018), and Adolphus Hailstork (b. 1941).

The duo also commissioned new works for two pianos, supported emerging composers of diverse backgrounds, and presented premiere performances of contemporary repertoire. Selected commissions and premiere performances are summarized below.

Commissions and Premieres
Composer	Title	Commission	Premiere
David Maves	Duet No. 1 (1964)		March 1976
Roque Jacinto Cordero	Duo 1954 for Two Pianos		January 11, 1980
David Maves	Concerto for Two Pianos and Orchestra		October 22, 1983
David Maves	Music for Two Pianos (1983)		June 1984
George Walker	Music for Two Pianos	1985	April 4, 1986
Adolphus Hailstork	Sonata for Two Pianos	1987	
Hale Smith	Mirrors: Rondo-Variations for Two Pianos	1988	
Frank Stemper	Ever Since That Day	1989	February 5, 1991

== Recordings ==
Although Delphin & Romain did not produce commercial audio or video recordings, limited documentation of the duo's performances has been preserved on archival and educational websites.

== Awards and recognition ==
- Music Teachers National Association (MTNA) Advocacy Award for Impact on the Music Teaching Profession, 2025
- Louisiana Music Teachers Association (LMTA) Pioneer Award, 2025.
- Gambit Tribute to the Classical Arts, Lifetime Achievement Award, 2016.
- South Carolina Governor's Award for the Arts, South Carolina Arts Commission, 1988.

== Member biographies ==
Wilfred Delphin (b. 1949, El Dorado, Arkansas) is an American classical pianist and educator. A longtime professor of piano at Southern Illinois University Carbondale (SIUC), he is best known as one half of the piano duo Delphin & Romain, the piano duo that performed internationally from 1977 to 1995. After retiring from SIUC in 2004, he continued performing and teaching, including serving as artist-in-residence at Xavier University of Louisiana, his alma mater. Delphin was a founding pianist and rehearsal coach for OperaCréole and has participated in community initiatives including Peace Corps volunteer work in Senegal and recovery efforts in New Orleans following Hurricane Katrina.

Edwin Romain (1950–1995, New Orleans, Louisiana) was an American classical pianist and educator. A professor of piano at Southern Illinois University Carbondale, he co-founded the piano duo Delphin & Romain with Wilfred Delphin. The duo debuted at Carnegie Hall in 1977 and performed internationally until 1995. In addition to his performing career, Romain was active as a teacher and lecturer, presenting recitals, workshops, and educational programs throughout the United States. His career ended with his death in 1995.
