= Ebenezer Child =

Ebenezer Child (17 August 1770 – 11 March 1866) was born in Union, Connecticut, and died in Castleton, Vermont.

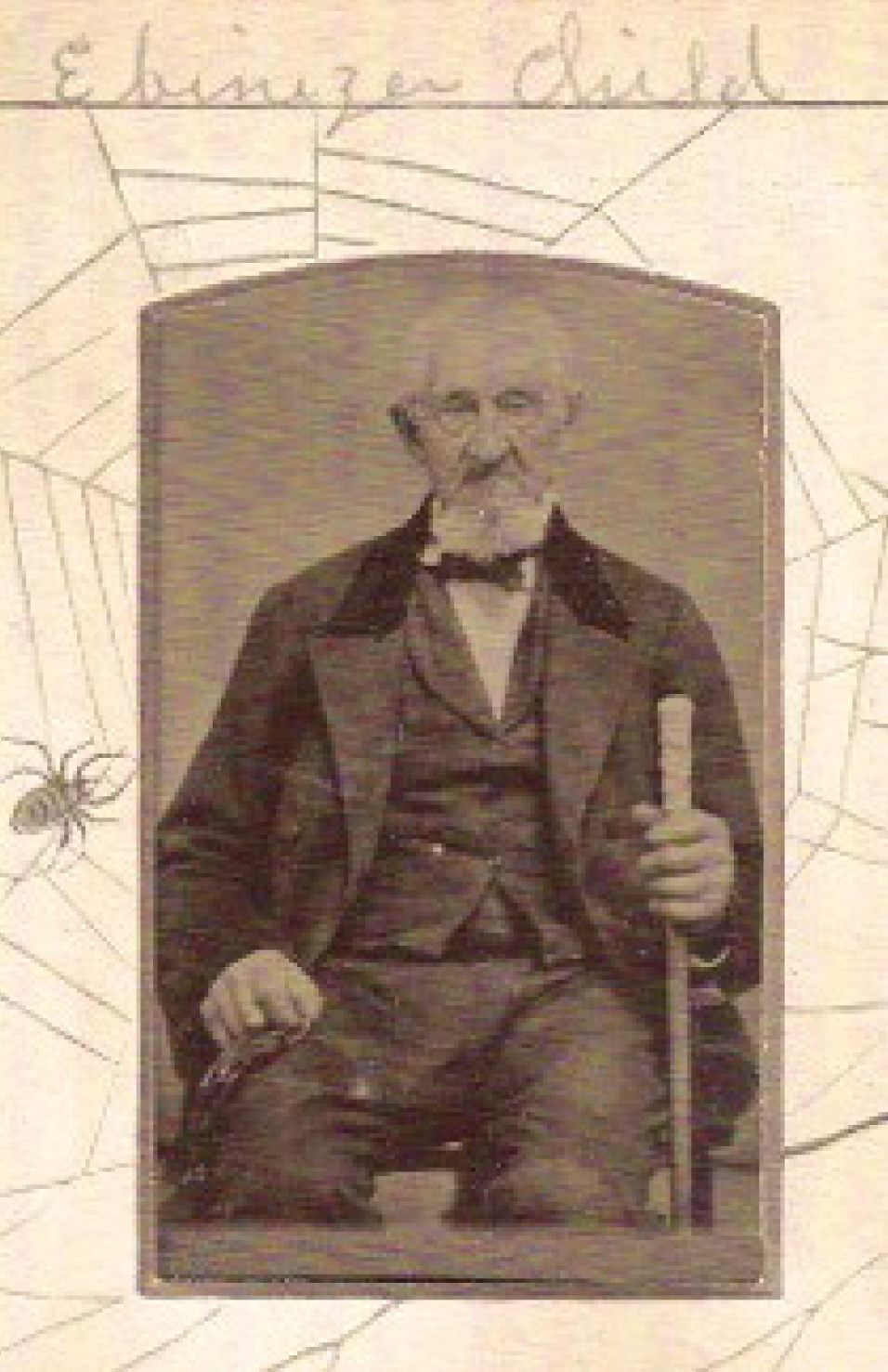
Ebenezer Child at the end of his life

== Life ==
Child was born the seventh child of Ebenezer Child Jr. (April 17, 1732 - June 7, 1791) and Charity (Bugbee) Child. Their fourth child was also Ebenezer (November 12, 1763 - August 3, 1768), but he died in childhood.

Ebenezer's mother Charity died when he was three years old, on December 20, 1772, and he was placed in the home of an "elder married sister" until his father remarried (Alice Cobb) in 1775. The family relocated to Vermont, near a town called Brandon. He helped clear the land and build the family's log house. He was accepted by letter into the Congregational Church of Connecticut on November 7, 1782.

Also in 1782, Ebenezer walked, alone, back to Connecticut to visit family for the winter. The following spring in 1773, he returned to Vermont.

His father died when he was 21. He married Anna Grey (March 24, 1776 - December 15, 1861) on December 6, 1792. They had 13 children, all of whom lived into adulthood.

In 1818, Ebenezer was appointed county surveyor "within and for the county of Rutland" He performed this job for the rest of his career. In 1825, he wrote an open letter to a professor of mathematics at Middlebury College, Frederick Hall. Ebenezer was struggling with how to use the North Star, because it was only at true north twice per day. He had spoken with Professor Hall about help with the calculations, but apparently Professor Hall hadn't gotten back to him, because his letter requests the professor reach out and help him.

At some point before 1850, Ebenezer moved his family to Castleton, Vermont, still in the county of Rutland. He retired there, according to the 1850 census.

He died the oldest person in Rutland County at the age of 95. He lived through the American Revolution, the War of 1812, and the American Civil War.

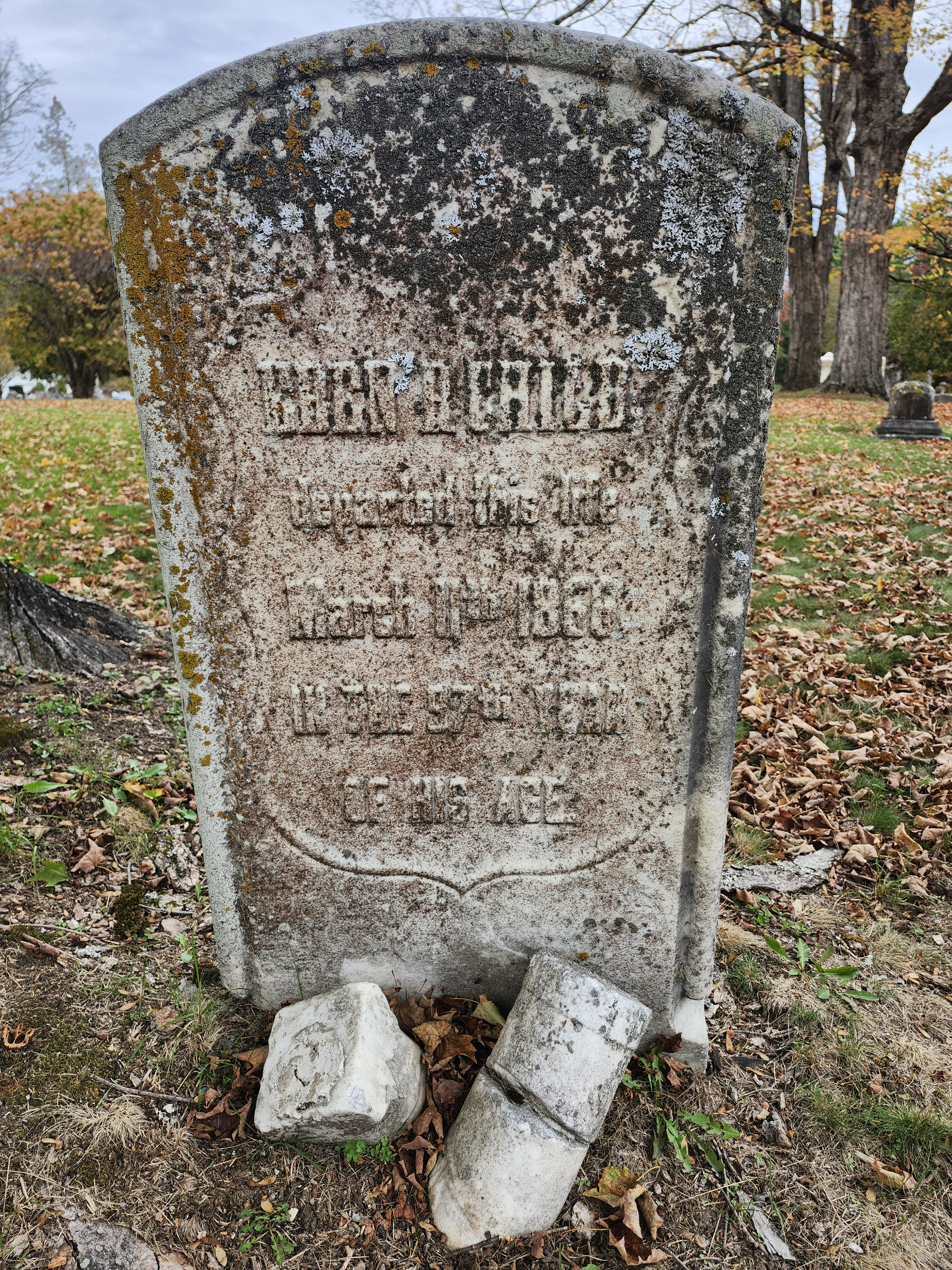
Headstone of Ebenezer Child, Castleton, VT

== Publications ==
- Child, Ebenezer. 1804.The Sacred Musician. Boston: Manning and Loring, 120 pp. IMSLP Image of 1804 Edition

The Sacred Musician is a beginner's book on singing. The full title is The Sacred Musician and Young Gentleman and Lady's Practical Guide to Music. In Three Parts

Part 1 is "an Introduction to the rudiments of psalmody, on a new plan." Part 2 is "a great variety of psalm tunes, constituting the different meters, airs, and keys usually introduced into sacred music." Part 3 is "a large number of Anthems, Odes, Dirges, and lengthy pieces of Music, &c." Child wrote all the music included in the book.

A few of Ebenezer's tunes have been transcribed into modern notation.

== Discography ==
- "Vermont Harmony 3": Selected works of Elisha West, Ebenezer Child, and Eliakim Doolittle - recordings by the University of Vermont Choral Union
