= Bert R. Anthony =

American composer

Bert R. Anthony (1876–1923) was an American composer. He wrote a number of pedagogical works for piano, and also composed a handful of songs.
