= Edward Margetson =

American composer

Edward Henry Margetson (December 31, 1891 - January 22, 1962) was a musician in the United States. He grew up in St. Kitts. He composed music and performed on the piano and organ. He received awards from the American Academy of Arts and Letters and the Rosenwald Foundation.

He was a church organist. He founded the Schubert Music Society. He played cricket. He was married to Rosamond Margetson. Several of his compositions were published.

The Richmond Public Library exhibited compositions African American composers including one by him.
