= Gregory Mertl =

American composer

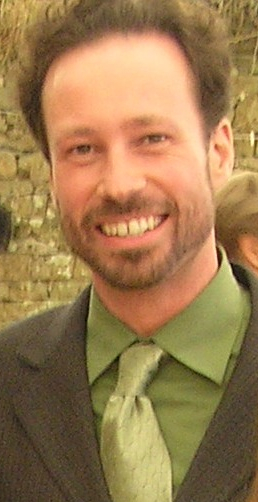
- Gregory Mertl
- Born: 1969 (age 56–57)
- Education: Yale University, Eastman School of Music
- Website: gregorymertl.com

Gregory Mertl (born 1969) is an American composer that has garnered commissions from the Tanglewood Music Center (1999), the Rhode Island Philharmonic (2000), the Tarab Cello Ensemble (2001), the Phoenix Symphony (2001), the Wind Ensembles of the Big Ten Universities (2002), the Ostrava Oboe Festival, Czech Republic (2005, 2009), Kenneth Meyer and the Hanson Institute (2006), the University of Oregon (2013), CSTMA (2013), counter)induction (2016), the University of Niš (2016), and the Barlow Endowment for a piano concerto for pianist Solungga Liu and the University of Minnesota Wind Ensemble, Craig Kirchhoff, conductor, which was premiered in November, 2011 and released by Bridge Records (BRIDGE 9489) in May 2017.

In 2010, Mertl presented work on a concert/lecture tour in Romania and Hungary and as a guest composer at KOFOMI (Komponistenforum Mittersill, Austria) where he had performances by the Austrian contemporary music ensemble "Die Reihe". Previously his music has reached audiences in France, at the Festival du Moulin d’ands and the France Musique radio station, Belgium, where he placed third at the Harelbeke International Wind Ensemble Composition Competition (2004), and the Czech Republic, where he was featured composer of the Ostrava Oboe Festival in both 2005 and 2009. In Asia, the Tainan Women’s College of Arts and Technology hosted a two-day conference featuring Mertl’s music in May 2005 and lectures and performances followed at several other Taiwanese universities. His music has also been performed in China, Japan, Singapore, Sweden, Canada, Mexico and Brazil. In the US, it has been heard widely (New York City, Chicago, Boston, Rochester, Honolulu, Baltimore, Tanglewood, Colgate, Northwestern, Yale, and Princeton Universities, and Vermont Public Radio during a two-hour program dedicated to his work). In 2007, Open Gate, an ensemble he co-founded, performed an entire evening of his chamber music on a tour that culminated at Weill Recital Hall in New York City.

Born in 1969, Mertl has degrees from Yale University (BA 1991) and the Eastman School of Music (Ph.D. in Music Composition 2005). He has been full-time Visiting Artist of Composition at the Setnor School of Music at Syracuse University (2008-2010) and has been composer-in-residence at Yaddo, Château de La Napoule in France, the Fundación Valparaiso in Spain, the Helen Wurlitzer Foundation in Taos, New Mexico, the Ragdale Foundation, the Virginia Center for the Creative Arts, the I-Park Artists Enclave in East Haddam, CT, and the Chamber Music Festival of the East at Bennington College in Vermont. He has won major awards such as the Chicago Symphony’s First Hearing Award and a 1998 Tanglewood Composition Fellowship. At Tanglewood, he studied with Henri Dutilleux and Mauricio Kagel.

In November 2014, Mertl presented his music at the University of São Paulo and at the University of Campinas in Brazil. In 2015 he was performed in Virginia, North Carolina, and Oklahoma and in two Open Gate showcases at the Tenri Cultural Institute in New York City. During the summer and fall of 2015 he was resident composer at the Oberpfälzer Künstlerhaus in Schwandorf, Germany and he was guest of honor at the Balkan Art Forum 2015 in Niš, Serbia where he gave the keynote address and presented his music. In April and May 2016, he returned to Brazil for performances, lectures and masterclasses at universities in São Paulo, (UNESP and USP), Goiâna (UFG), Porto Alegre (UFRGS), and Pelotas (UFPEL).

In 2017 Mertl was a resident composer in Vigoulet-Auzil, France where he presented his work at the end of his stay in a concert-lecture format. He returns to VCCA in January 2018 and to Brazil for another tour of universities in May and June.

Of his Bridge release, the American Record Guide complimented its "compositional ingenuity and detail", and Fanfare Magazine noted its "distinctive and compelling voice".

== Awards and recognition ==
Mertl is full-time Visiting Artist of Composition at the Setnor School of Music at Syracuse University. He has degrees from Yale University (BA 1991) and the Eastman School of Music (Ph.D. in Music Composition 2005) and has been composer-in-residence at The Ragdale Foundation (August 2008), the Virginia Center for the Creative Arts (Fall 2007), at the I-Park Artists Enclave in East Haddam, CT (July 2006, May 2008, September 2009), and at the Chamber Music Festival of the East at Bennington College in Vermont (2001).

He has won major awards such as the Chicago Symphony's First Hearing Award and a 1998 Tanglewood Composition Fellowship. At Tanglewood, he studied with Henri Dutilleux and Mauricio Kagel.
