= Johann H. Beck =

American composer and conductor

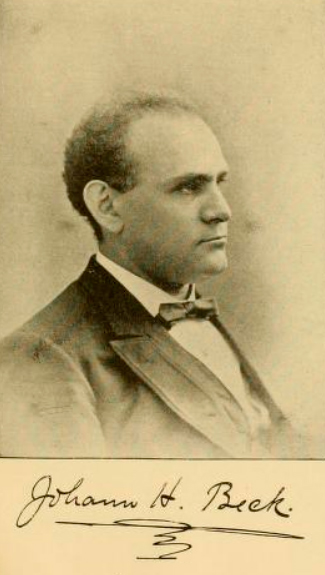
- Bust of Beck in the Cleveland Public Library
- Born: Johann Heinrich Beck; September 12, 1856; Cleveland, Ohio
- Died: May 26, 1924 (aged 67); Cleveland

Johann Heinrich Beck (September 12, 1856 – May 26, 1924) was an American composer and conductor. Born in Cleveland, Ohio, he wrote a number of pieces for orchestra, as well as a string sextet and a string quartet. He also gave music composition instruction to African-American opera composer Harry Lawrence Freeman.

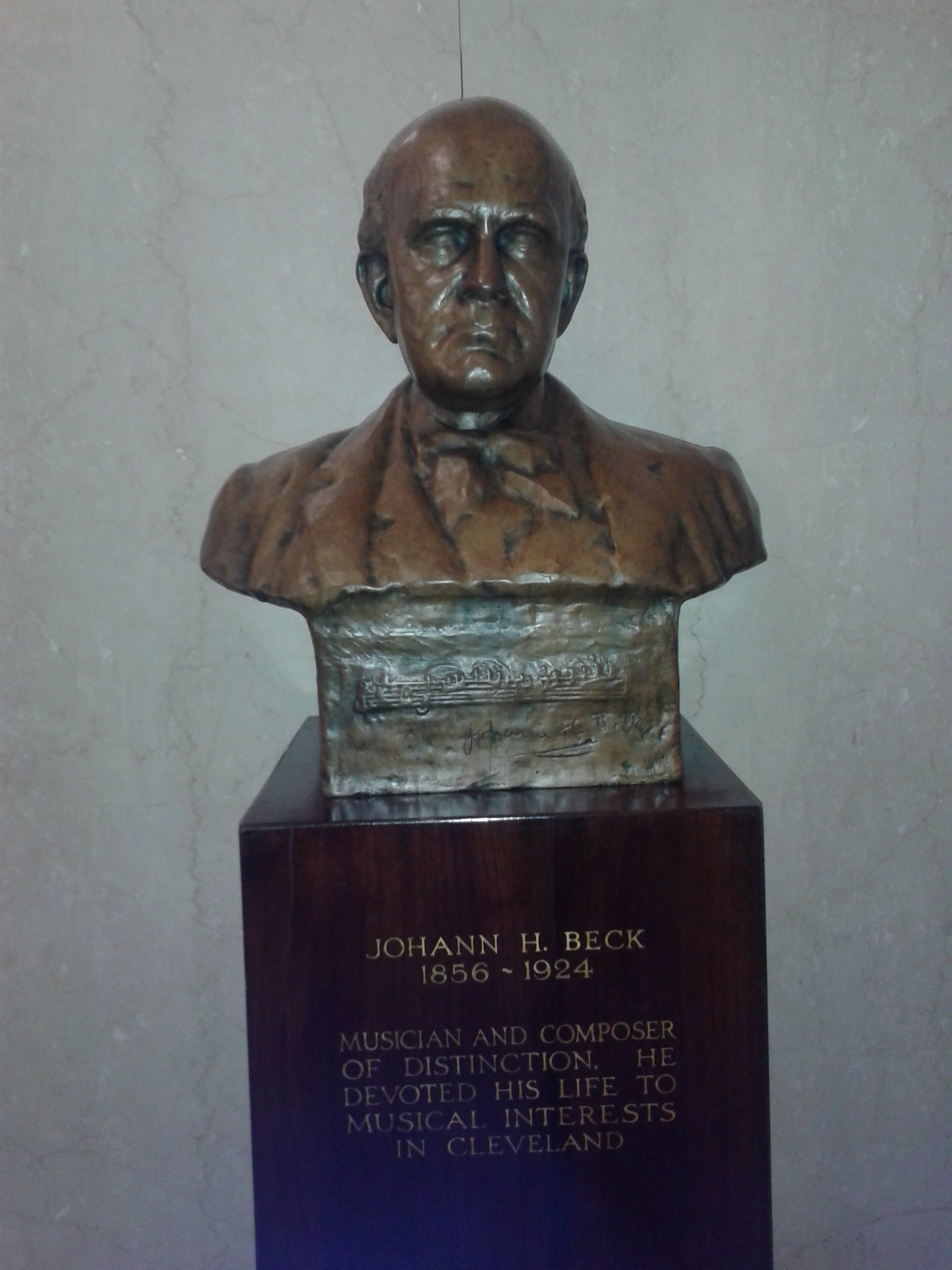
Bust of Beck in the Cleveland Public Library

He died in Cleveland on May 26, 1924, aged 67. He was buried in Woodland Cemetery.

In 1890 Beck married Mary Blanding Fellar of Tiffin, Ohio. They had son Henry J. and daughter Hildegarde.

== Works ==
- 1887 - unfinished opera "Salammbo"
- "Lara" overture
- String Quartet in C Minor
