= Harry Lawrence Freeman =

American composer and conductor (1869–1954)

Harry Lawrence Freeman

Harry Lawrence Freeman (October 9, 1869 – March 24, 1954) was an American neoromantic opera composer, conductor, impresario and teacher. He was the first African-American to write an opera (Epthalia, 1891) that was successfully produced. Freeman founded the Freeman School of Music and the Freeman School of Grand Opera, as well as several short-lived opera companies which gave first performances of his own compositions. During his life, he was known as "the black Wagner."

== Biography ==
Harry Lawrence Freeman was born in Cleveland, Ohio, in 1869, to parents Lemuel Freeman and Agnes Silms-Freeman. Freeman learned to play the piano and was an assistant church organist by the age of 10. At the age of 18, he was inspired to begin composing his own music after attending a performance of Richard Wagner's opera Tannhäuser.

=== Early career: Freeman Opera Company ===
By the age of 22, Freeman had founded the Freeman Opera Company in Denver, Colorado. His first opera, Epthelia, was performed at the Deutsches Theater in Denver in 1891. His second opera, The Martyr, premiered at the same theater on August 16, 1893. It was also produced by the Freeman Opera Company, and concerned an Egyptian nobleman put to death for accepting the religion of Jehovah. The Freeman Opera Company went on to produce The Martyr in Chicago in October 1893 and in Cleveland in 1894. This was the first opera in the United States to be produced by an all-Black production company. The Martyr is also listed by John Warthen Struble as "produced in Denver, first known opera by an African-American composer." Although this is clearly incorrect given the staging of Epthelia two years earlier, Freeman was certainly a pioneering classical composer in the African-American community.

In 1894, Freeman returned to live in Cleveland, and began formal training in music theory under Johann Heinrich Beck, conductor of the Cleveland Symphony (a different organization from the Cleveland Orchestra, which was founded in 1918). In 1898, Freeman married Charlotte Loise Thomas, a woman from Charleston, South Carolina who sang soprano. Two years later, Charlotte (who was also known as Carlotta) gave birth to Freeman's son Valdo, and the same year, the Cleveland Orchestra gave readings of excerpts from Freeman's operas. For the next decade, the new family lived in Cleveland, Chicago, and Xenia, Ohio, where Freeman was director of the music program at Wilberforce University in 1902 and 1903.

=== Harlem: Negro Grand Opera Company ===
Around 1908, the Freeman family moved to the Harlem neighborhood of New York City. In 1912, ragtime composer Scott Joplin, who was then living in New York, asked Freeman's help in revising his three-act opera, "Treemonisha," production of which had stalled the previous year. The extent of Freeman's help is unknown. In 1920, he opened the Salem School of Music on 133rd Street in Harlem, later renamed Freeman School of Music. Also in 1920, he founded the Negro Grand Opera Company, which produced several productions of his own works. Freeman's wife Carlotta and his son Valdo, a baritone, sang principal roles in many of the Negro Grand Opera Company's productions.

In addition to grand opera, Freeman wrote stage music and served as musical director for vaudeville and musical theater companies in the early 1900s. These included Ernest Hogan's Musical Comedy Company, of which Carlotta Freeman was the prima donna; the Cole-Johnson African-American musical theater company, and the John Larkins Musical Comedy Company. He was musical director and wrote additional music for the Hogan's Musical Comedy Company production Rufus Rastus, which premiered on January 29, 1906 at the American Theatre. He wrote the music for the musical comedy Captain Rufus, which premiered August 12, 1907 at the Harlem Music Hall. He was guest conductor and composer/music director of the pageant O Sing a New Song at the Chicago World's Fair in 1934.

Voodoo (1928) is perhaps Freeman's best known work. It deals with the cult of that name in Louisiana. Although Freeman finished composing the opera in 1914, it was not premiered until fourteen years later. On September 10, 1928, at Palm Garden at 310 West 52nd Street in New York's Broadway district, with an all-black cast. A May 20, 1928 concert performance of Voodoo was broadcast live on New York radio station WGBS, which Elise Kirk identifies as one of the earliest operas composed by an American to be broadcast on radio. It was the first opera by an African-American to be presented on Broadway. Its score combines themes from spirituals, Southern melodies, jazz, and traditional Italian opera.

Harry Lawrence Freeman was one of the pioneers of the fusion of opera with jazz, and this part of his life shows how ahead of his time he was. Freeman is one of the first composers to combine aspects of African American musical traditions like jazz and blues with the structure of European opera. The combination of these different styles of music was uncommon at the time and challenged the typical expectations of classical music.

Voodoo is one of the most well known examples of jazz-opera fusion. The setting of Louisiana and themes of African religion and southern culture made it a vessel for combining aspects of the starkly different styles. Freeman included many musical aspects including but not limited to syncopated rhythms, spirituals, and ragtime.

Even though Freeman didn’t become a household name, his work inspired future developments in concert music, opera, and theater influenced by jazz. Some well known composers like George Gershwin as well as Duke Ellington followed in Freeman’s footsteps by blending aspects of jazz with classical forms.

Freeman received the prestigious Harmon Foundation Award in 1930 for achievement in music.

At New York's Steinway Hall in 1930, Freeman accompanied at the piano a performance of excerpts from The Martyr, The Prophecy, The Octoroon, Plantation, Vendetta and Voodoo.

=== Negro Choral Society ===
Among Freeman’s many musical accomplishments is the Negro Choral Society. This group was founded by Harry Lawrence Freeman himself in the late 19th century and played a pivotal role in the cultural development of music composed by African American artists. This 75 member group, based in Washington, D.C., was formed in 1912 and created a society that provided a space for African American musicians to present and perform choral works that incorporated both European classical traditions and African American spirituals. This group acted as a vehicle for social change due to the challenges it presented for the racial stereotypes that were so prevalent at the time by showing the range of artistic capabilities that African American people had. The group performed repertoire including mainly hymns, spirituals, and other works by African American composers in venues such as churches, concert halls, and more. Even during a time of racial segregation and inequalities, Freeman’s vision in creating and leading the group overall broadened the development of African American music and compositions. Freeman and the Negro Choral Society stood as a testament to both the artistic excellence and resilience of the community of African American artists in the late 19th to early 20th centuries.

=== Death and obscurity ===
Freeman died of a heart ailment at his home at 214 West 127th Street, New York City on March 24, 1954. His wife Carlotta died only three months later. The last couple of decades of his life were marked with frustration as he struggled to get any performances of his work. Almost all of his music was unpublished at the time of his death, and no recordings of his work have ever been released commercially. Twenty-one of his operas, as well as many of his other works, survive in Freeman's own manuscripts, and are kept in a collection of his papers at Columbia University.

== List of works ==
Freeman composed at least twenty-three operas, Many, including a massive tetralogy Zululand which filled over 2,000 pages of score, were never performed. In addition to composing the music, Freeman wrote his own librettos for almost all of his operas.

Freeman's works for stage include:

- Epthalia, opera (1891, Deutsches Theater, Denver)
- The Martyr, opera in two acts, libretto by the composer (August 16, 1893, Freeman Grand Opera Company, Deutsches Theater, Denver)
- Nada, opera in three acts, libretto by the composer (1898; unperformed)
- Zuluki (revision of Nada) (scenes performed by the Cleveland Symphony in 1900)
- An African Kraal, opera in one act, libretto by the composer (1903; student production at Wilberforce University)
- The Octoroon, opera in four acts with prologue, libretto by the composer (1904; unperformed)
- Valdo, opera in one act with intermezzo, libretto by the composer (May 1906, Freeman Grand Opera Company, Weisgerber's Hall, Cleveland)
- Captain Rufus, musical comedy (August 12, 1907, Harlem Music Hall, New York City)
- The Tryst, opera in one act, libretto by the composer (May 1911; Freeman Operatic Duo, Crescent Theater, N.Y. Wampum: Carlotta Freeman; Lone Star: Hugo Williams)
- The Prophecy, opera in one act, libretto by the composer (1911; unperformed)
- The Plantation, opera in three (or four) acts, libretto by the composer (1915; performed at Carnegie Hall 1930)
- Athalia, opera in three acts with prologue, libretto by the composer (1916; unperformed)
- Vendetta, opera in three acts, libretto by the composer (November 12, 1923, Negro Grand Opera Company, Inc., Lafayette Theater, Harlem)
- American Romance, jazz opera (1927)
- Voodoo, opera in three acts, libretto by the composer (composed c. 1914; premiered by the Negro Grand Opera Company on New York radio station WGBS on May 20, 1928, and on September 10, 1928 at the Palm Garden on Broadway)
- Leah Kleschna. Libretto by the composer, after the play of C. M. S. McLellan (1931; unperformed)
- Allah, opera, based on H. Rider Haggard's novels (1947)
- The Zulu King, opera, based on H. Rider Haggard's novels (1934)
- The Slave, symphonic poem (1932)
- Uzziah (1931)
- Zululand, a four-opera cycle based on H. Rider Haggard's novel Nada, the Lily (1941-1944). The titles of the individual operas are Chaka, The Ghost-Wolves, The Stone-Witch, and Umslopogaas and Nada. All were unperformed.

Freeman published quite a few popular songs, including arrangements of spirituals, and wrote some music for the concert hall, including:

- The Loves of Pompeii, a song cycle
- My Son, a cantata
- The Slave, a symphonic poem
- Salome, a ballet with chorus
- Coleville Coon Cadets, a marching song

== Influence ==
Although many of his works were successful during his lifetime, they are not played today. He achieved many firsts for a black American in the field of classical and popular music. While Elise Kirk cites several operas composed by African-Americans earlier in the nineteenth century, it appears that none of these ever were staged in their entirety before Freeman's Epithalia in 1891. Freeman founded and played important roles in the direction of several African-American opera companies and other arts organizations, including the Pekin Stock Company in Chicago, which was one of the first "legitimate" theaters in the United States to be owned and run by African-Americans. Freeman was a close friend of famous Ragtime musician Scott Joplin and was acquainted with many African-American musicians and artists associated with the Harlem Renaissance.

== See also ==
- African-American musical theater
