= Johannes Herbst =

Johannes Herbst (July 23, 1735 – January 15, 1812) was a German-American Moravian minister and composer.

Herbst was born in Kempten in Bavaria, Germany. He went to live in Silesia with an uncle when he was seven years old. His uncle paid for him to attend school in Herrnhut, Germany. There he trained to be a clockmaker, but the community in Herrnhut also provided him with the opportunity to learn music. Herbst lived in various Moravian communities serving as an organist in Kleinwelka and a teacher at a Moravian school in England. After returning to Germany to become a bookkeeper for the Moravian church, he married Rosine Louisa Clemens in Herrnhut on June 30, 1768. He was ordained a Moravian minister and served the congregations of Neudietendorf and Gnadenfrei until he received a call to America in 1786. There he served congregations in Lancaster and Lititz, Pennsylvania.

Herbst was also an active composer and produced over one hundred anthems and two hundred sacred songs. In addition to composing music, Herbst also copied a great deal of music from other composers and eventually amassed a collection of over one thousand anthems and many larger works.

Herbst was consecrated a bishop of the Moravian Church on May 12, 1811 and served the church in Salem, North Carolina for seven months before his death. many of his musical compositions are held by the moravian music foundation.
