= Craig H. Russell =

American composer of classical music (born 1951)

Craig H. Russell (born April 3, 1951) is an American composer of classical music.

Russell was educated at the University of New Mexico and then the University of North Carolina at Chapel Hill, and began a career both as a classical guitarist and as a composer of classical music, in which he follows in the stylistic footsteps of Aaron Copland. He has also been associated with the vocal ensemble, Chanticleer, as well as holding a professorship at California Polytechnic State University, San Luis Obispo.

Russell composed Middle Earth, a suite after J. R. R. Tolkien's The Hobbit and The Lord of the Rings, for the San Luis Obispo Youth Symphony. Commissioned in 1995, a recording was released on disk in 2000 by the San Luis Obispo Symphony, together with his Rhapsody for Horn and Orchestra, and the second movement of his Symphony No. 2 ("American Scenes"). He also arranged three compositions for the 2006 film Nacho Libre, which were performed by Chanticleer.

== Discography ==
- Russell, Craig. Rhapsody for Horn and Orchestra; Middle Earth; Gate City—A Methodist Hymn. Richard Todd, horn; San Luis Obispo Symphony Orchestra. Michael Nowak, cond. Naxos American Classics CD 8.559168.
