= Benjamin Lees =

American classical composer

- Born: January 8, 1924
- Died: May 31, 2010
- Occupation: Composer
- Website: www.benjaminlees.com

Benjamin Lees (January 8, 1924 – May 31, 2010) was an American composer of classical music.

== Early life ==
Lees was born Benjamin George Lisniansky in Harbin, Manchuria, of Russian-Jewish descent. Lees was still an infant when his family emigrated to the United States and settled in California. He began piano lessons at 5 with Kiva Ihil Rodetsky of San Francisco. When he was seven years old, he became an American citizen. In 1939, he moved with his family to Los Angeles and continued studies in piano with Marguerite Bitter. In his early teens, he studied harmony and theory and began to compose.

After serving in the United States military, Lees studied composition under Halsey Stevens, as well as with Kanitz and Ingolf Dahl, at the University of Southern California in Los Angeles, California. Composer George Antheil, impressed by Lees' compositions, offered further tutelage; this period lasted four years, at the end of which Lees won a Fromm Foundation Award. Of Antheil, Lees declared: "He changed my life."

The receipt of a Guggenheim Fellowship in 1954 allowed him to live in Europe, realizing his goal of developing his individual style away from current fashions in the American art music scene and resulting in a number of mature and impressive works. Returning to the United States in 1961, he divided his time between composition and teaching at several institutions. These included the Peabody Conservatory (1962–64, 1966–68), Queens College (1964–66), the Manhattan School of Music (1972–74), and the Juilliard School (1976–77).

== Compositions ==
Lees rejected atonalism and Americana in favor of classical structures. Niall O'Loughlin writes in The New Grove Dictionary of Music and Musicians, "From an early interest in the bittersweet melodic style of Prokofiev and the bizarre and surrealist aspects of Bartók's music, he progressed naturally under the unconventional guidance of Antheil." Lees' music is rhythmically active, with frequently changing accents and meter even in his early works, and is known for its semitonal inflections in melody and harmony.

In 1954, the NBC Symphony Orchestra performed his Profiles for Orchestra on a national radio broadcast. In 1970, Medea in Corinth, his one-act musical drama, was given its premiere at the Purcell Room, Queen Elizabeth Hall, London, and was subsequently broadcast by CBS Television in 1974. Other, notable works include Symphony No. 4: Memorial Candles, commissioned by the Dallas Symphony Orchestra in 1985 to commemorate the Holocaust, and Symphony No. 5: Kalmar Nyckel, written in 1986 to honor the founding of Wilmington, Delaware. (Kalmar Nyckel was the name of the ship that first carried the original settlers from Sweden to what would become Wilmington.) In 1994 Echoes of Normandy was commissioned by the Dallas Symphony Orchestra to commemorate the 50th anniversary of the D-Day landings. His 1998 Piano Trio no. 2, Silent Voices, written in Palm Springs, is dedicated to the music of émigré Jewish composers.

Lees received a Grammy nomination for Kalmar Nyckel in 2003, following release of a recording by the German orchestra Staatsphilharmonie Rheinland-Pfalz under Stephen Gunzenhauser. He lost to Dominick Argento.

== Personal life ==
Lees married Luba Leatrice Banks in 1948. They had one daughter. Lees donated his archive of manuscripts, sketches, scores, letters, photographs, articles, recordings and posters to Yale University. Shortly before his death at age 86, he emailed that he was, "busy as fleas in a circus". He died in Glen Cove, New York.

== Awards and honors ==
- 1953: Fromm Foundation Award
- 1954: Guggenheim Fellowship
- 1955: Copley Medal
- 1956: Fulbright Fellowship
- 1958: UNESCO Award, Sir Arnold Bax Society Medal
- 1966: Guggenheim Fellowship
- 1985: Lancaster Symphony Orchestra's Composer's Award
- 2003: Grammy Nomination
- National Patron of Delta Omicron, an international professional music fraternity.

== Discography ==
- Concerto for String Quartet and Orchestra (RCA, conducted by Igor Buketoff)
- Etudes for Piano & Orchestra (Albany)
- Horn Concerto (New World)
- Passacaglia for Orchestra (Delos)
- Piano Concerto No 1 (Pierian)
- Piano Concerto No. 2 (Albany)
- Piano Sonata No. 4, Mirrors, Fantasy Variations (Albany)
- Piano Trio No. 2: Silent Voices (Albany, DUX)
- Prologue, Capriccio and Epilog (CRI)
- String Quartets Nos. 1, 5 and 6 (Naxos)
- Symphonies No. 2, No. 3 and No. 5 (Albany)
- Symphony No. 4: Memorial Candles (Naxos)
- Violin Concerto (VoxBox, EPR)
- Violin Sonata No. 2 (Polystone)
- Violin Works (Complete) (Albany)
