= Houston Bright =

American composer

Robert Houston Bright (January 21, 1916 – December 8, 1970) was a composer of American music, known primarily for his choral works. The best-known of these is an original spiritual "I Hear a Voice A-Prayin'," but he wrote dozens of highly regarded pieces over the course of his career, including a number of instrumental compositions. Bright was, among his peers, well known and respected as a composer, choral director, and professor. He spent his entire academic career in the Music Department of West Texas State College (now West Texas A&M University).

== Life ==
Houston Bright was born January 21, 1916, in Midland, Texas. He was the son of a Methodist minister, the Rev. John R. Bright. Houston learned to read music and play the piano while still a small boy; he composed his first piece of music at the age of ten. In his teens he studied voice, clarinet, and cornet, as well as piano. He attended high school in Shamrock, in the Texas Panhandle (although the 1938 West Texas yearbook, Le Mirage, shows his hometown to be Plainview). After graduating from high school in 1932, he attended West Texas State. He organized a dance band, the "Kampus Katz," in the 1935–1936 school year; the band played locally and also toured Texas, New Mexico, and Colorado during the following summer.

While a college student Houston also became known as a classical vocalist, singing baritone in solo recitals and as a soloist in college oratorio concerts; his brother, Weldon, sang tenor. (Weldon Bright, also musically gifted, went on to become a jazz pianist and organist, the leader of a regionally popular dance band, and music director of Amarillo's KGNC radio station during the 1950s; after leaving radio, he, too, turned to teaching music.)

Bright received his Bachelor of Science degree in music in 1938. Afterward he was the first student in his college to be designated as a "graduate assistant." He received his Master of Arts degree in music education in 1940 and took a full-time faculty appointment at that time. On June 5, 1941, he was wed to Frances May Usery, a West Texas State piano instructor whom he had met while he was still a student. "Music brought us together," he later said. "She was my accompanist."

During World War II, Bright served as an Army officer in Europe 1942–1945, leaving the service as a captain in the infantry to return to West Texas. Through summer study and a leave of absence, he completed his work for a Ph.D. degree in musicology in 1952 at the University of Southern California. There he studied conducting under Dr. Charles C. Hirt, musicology under visiting professor Curt Sachs, and composition under Austrian émigré composer Ernest Kanitz and American composer Halsey Stevens. His dissertation was titled The Early Tudor Part-Song from Newarke to Cornyshe.

Beginning as an instructor, Bright rose to the rank of full professor; he taught composition and music theory, and directed the college's A Cappella Choir, which he founded in 1941. The various West Texas choirs (which included a larger Chorale and a women's choir, along with other, smaller ensembles) frequently toured the Texas Panhandle, Oklahoma, and New Mexico, and they premiered many of Bright's works. His earliest published compositions are the choral pieces "Weep You No More, Sad Fountains" and "Evening Song of the Weary," both dating from 1949. In 1965, college president James P. Cornette, honoring Bright's twenty-five years of creative service to the college, granted him the title of Composer-in-Residence.

Throughout his three decades at West Texas, Bright was surrounded by, and worked with, considerable musical talent. Some of his early works (both choral and instrumental) were composed specifically with West Texas music ensembles in mind, and dedicated to them. Among his academic colleagues was Royal Brantley, the original musical director and eventual artistic director of the long-running outdoor musical drama Texas, performed each summer at nearby Palo Duro Canyon. Another colleague was band director Gary Garner, who was later honored by the Texas Bandmasters Association as 1987's "Bandmaster of the Year."

Hugh Sanders, who served as Bright's assistant director for the West Texas choral program, subsequently succeeded him as its director; Sanders ultimately gained great acclaim as choral director at Baylor University. Bright also mentored the young choral teacher Alfred R. Skoog, who went on to serve as director of choral activities at Arkansas State University for over three decades.

In the decades following Bright's death in 1970, West Texas and the Texas A&M Board of Regents honored him as a Professor Emeritus and a music department scholarship was created in his memory.

Bright's professional memberships included the American Choral Directors Association, the Choral Conductors Guild of America, the Texas Composers Guild, and the American Society of Composers, Authors, and Publishers (ASCAP). He also conducted numerous workshops, including two for the Texas Choral Directors Association.

Bright continued composing and teaching until his death, of cancer, on December 8, 1970 in Canyon. He was 54 years old. His widow, the pianist and teacher Frances Usery Bright, donated his original manuscripts and other papers to the West Texas A&M University Music Library the following year. In 1974, Shawnee Press published his "We'll Sing a Glory" as a concluding opus posthumous.

== Books ==
- Elementary Counterpoint in Two Parts: A Modified Species Method
  - West Texas State College Press (1958)
- Modern Tonal Counterpoint in Two Parts: Strict and Linear Styles
  - West Texas State University (1965)

== Musical works ==
The works of Houston Bright comprise around one hundred compositions, including pieces for symphony orchestra, concert band, choir, piano, and instrumental chamber ensembles, as well as a handful of songs for solo voice and piano. His music has been performed not only throughout North America and Europe but in South America, Taiwan, Japan, and Africa as well. Diverse choral and instrumental groups have performed (and recorded) his music, including the Mormon Tabernacle Choir, the Amarillo Symphony, the Wiener Singakademie, the American Woodwind Quintet, the Slovak Philharmonic Choir (Slovenský Filharmonický Zbor) of Bratislava, the Eastman Wind Ensemble, and Fred Waring and His Pennsylvanians. Most of Bright's scores were originally published by Waring's Shawnee Press.

=== Symphony orchestra ===
- Symphonic Dance (composed 1950)
- Symphony in E minor (1957–1959)
  1. Poco allegro
  2. Lento assai
  3. Menuetto, in modo poco burlesco
  4. Allegro energico
- The Vision of Isaiah, trilogy for orchestra and chorus (1966)

The Amarillo Symphony Orchestra premiered Bright's Symphonic Dance in 1951, and his Symphony in E minor on March 24, 1959. Both were conducted by that ensemble's music director, A. Clyde Roller.

The Vision of Isaiah (originally titled Isaiah in the Temple), a three-movement cantata or short oratorio, received its debut on November 1, 1966 by the Amarillo Symphony Orchestra and a special two-hundred-voice Festival Chorus, under the baton of Roller's successor, Dr. Thomas Hohstadt. The work was subsequently published by Shawnee Press as a score for organ and chorus, with the orchestral score and parts for hire.

=== Concert band ===
- Sketches from the West (composed 1954)
  1. Indian Ceremonial
  2. Nightrider's Lament
  3. Prairie Serenade
  4. Dance of the Sun Devils
- Marche de Concert (1956)
- Prelude and Fugue in F minor (1958)
- Passacaglia in G minor (1964)
- Concerto Grosso in E minor (1968)
  1. Allegro moderato
  2. Lento cantabile
  3. Allegro commodo

"Houston Bright combined academically correct form with fresh and brilliant scoring," write professors Norman E. Smith and Albert Stoutamire in their volume Band Music Notes, a global survey of the wind-ensemble genre. "He handled the colors of the band with skill and variety."

During preparations for the two-hundredth anniversary of the founding of the United States of America (1776–1976), the National Association for Music Education (NAfME/MENC) appointed a Bicentennial Commission to recognize, and promote the performance of, "significant" works by American composers. Two works by Bright — his Prelude and Fugue in F minor and his Passacaglia in G minor — were so honored in the commission's "Selective List of American Music for the Bicentennial Celebration," alongside music by such canonical U.S. composers as Sousa, Gershwin, and Copland.

Bright's Prelude and Fugue in F minor, in particular, has come to be considered a standard of the wind band repertory. In the 2007 volume Composers on Composing for Band, for example, Dr. Jared Spears (professor emeritus of music, Arkansas State University) ranks that composition as being among "Ten Works All Band Conductors at All Levels Should Study," categorizing the piece as "intelligently written, historically important," and "educationally worthwhile."

=== Piano ===
- Ironic Dance (composed 1949)
- Sonata in E minor (1952)
- Rondo Introspetto (1956)
- Toccata in D minor (1957)
- Four for Piano: A Short Suite (1957)
  1. Notion
  2. Invention on a Ground
  3. Quick Dance
  4. Finale
- Variations on an Interrupted Theme (1962)

In her wide-ranging Pianist's Guide to Standard Teaching and Performance Literature, Prof. Jane Magrath cites Houston Bright's Four for Piano as a suite of "upbeat, rhythmic pieces that may captivate the student [pianist] who thinks he does not like contemporary music."

=== Woodwind quintet ===
- Three Short Dances (composed 1961)
  1. Little Quick Dance
  2. Nostalgic Song
  3. Finale

"Houston Bright is Composer-in Residence and head of the Theory Department of West Texas State University," writes Clark F. Galehouse in notes accompanying a commercial recording of the woodwind quintet. "In the three movements of this suite, he injects fresh musical interest and enjoyable listening into the classic fast-slow-fast pattern."

=== Brass quartet ===
- Legend and Canon: Two Short Pieces (composed 1953)

Bright's Legend and Canon was included in a "Selected List of Twentieth-Century Ensembles for Three or More Brass Instruments," published in Music Educators Journal after the composer's death. In the accompanying article ("Music for Brass Comes into Its Own"), Prof. John R. Shoemaker described the works so chosen as "outstanding" pieces of music numbering "among the most important in the literature." The compositions were selected by a group consisting of classical-music critics and members of the National Association of College Wind and Percussion Instructors who were recognized as "specialists in the brass chamber-music field"; their wide-ranging list encompasses a variety of works by American and European composers such as Gunther Schuller, Francis Poulenc, Paul Hindemith, and Malcolm Arnold.

=== Solo voice ===
(arranged alphabetically)

- "Simon Danz," song for voice and piano; text by Longfellow
- "Spring Morning," song for voice and piano; text by Mary Miller Beard
- "Sweet Wife," song for voice and piano; text by Charles Kingsley
- "The Ways of Zion Do Mourn," song for medium voice and piano; text from Lamentations 1–2
- "Whither Shall I Go from Thy Spirit?," song for baritone and organ; text from Psalm 139

=== Choir ===
(arranged alphabetically)

- Antiphonal Gloria
- August Noon
- Benedictus and Hosanna
- Clouds that Veil the Midnight Moon
- Come to Me, Gentle Sleep
- Could Ye Not Watch with Me
- The Days that Are No More
- De Profundis (Out of Great Depths)
- Dirge for the Dead Moths
- Evening Song of the Weary
- Four Sacred Songs for the Night
  - Vespers (Evensong)
  - Compline (Nightfall)
  - Matins (Dawn)
  - Lauds (Sunrise)
- From "A Child's Garden of Verses"
  - The River
  - Happy Thought
  - Windy Nights
  - Whole Duty of Children
  - Autumn Fires
- High Tide
- Hodie Nobis Coelorum Rex (Today Is Born the King of Heaven)
- The House that Jack Built
- I Hear a Voice A-Prayin'
- I Ride an Old Paint (folksong arrangement)
- Invitation
- Is Not the Life More than Meat
- Jabberwocky
- A Joyous Christmas Carol
- Kyrie Eleison
- Lament of the Enchantress
- The Lotos Dust
- Never Tell Thy Love
- Now Deck Thyself with Majesty
- Now Sing We All His Praise
- The People that Walked in Darkness
- Premonition
- Rainsong
- Reflection
- Rest Comes at Eve (by Adolf Jensen; arranged by Bright)
- Rhapsody
- Sailor's Alleluia
- Same Train (folksong arrangement)
- Seaweed
- Sing a Song of Sixpence
- Softly Flow the Midnight Hours
- Soliloquy
- Solomon Grundy
- A Song in the Wind
- Song of the Meadow Lark
- Star, Moon, and Wind
- The Stars Are with the Voyager
- Streets of Laredo (folksong arrangement)
- Summer Evening
- Sunrise Alleluia
- Sunrise in the Orient (by Sergei Taneiev; arranged by Bright)
- The Tale Untold
- Te Deum laudamus
- That's All (The Final Encore)
- Thou Wilt Keep Him in Perfect Peace
- Three Quatrains from the Rubaiyat of Omar Khayyam
- Three Responses for the Sanctuary Choir
  1. Introit
  2. Morning Prayer
  3. Benediction
- Thy Lovely Saints
- Tol' My Cap'n (folksong arrangement)
- Trilogy for Women's Voices
  - Fall, Leaves, Fall
  - Rough Wind that Moanest Loud
  - The Sigh that Heaves the Grasses
- Unseasonable Song
- Veniet Dominus (Advent antiphon)
- The Vision of Isaiah
  1. I Saw the Lord
  2. And the Posts of the Door Moved
  3. Then Said I, Woe Is Me
- Walk-a With Peter and Paul
- The Walrus and the Carpenter
- Watchman, What of the Night?
- We'll Sing a Glory
- Weep You No More, Sad Fountains
- What Can an Old Man Do?
- When Spring Is on the Meadow
- When the Lamp Is Shattered
- Winter Night on the Mountain
- Winter Song

Bright's best-known choral piece, the original spiritual "I Hear a Voice A-Prayin'" (1955), was composed for mixed chorus (SATB); the work proved so popular that the composer subsequently transcribed it for men's chorus (TTBB); a transcription for women's chorus (SSAA) followed, and later an SSAB arrangement (made by Greg Gilpin) for "young and developing" choirs as well. Other well known, internationally performed Bright choral compositions include (to cite but a few examples) "Rainsong," "Never Tell Thy Love," "Three Quatrains from the Rubaiyat," "Reflection," the Trilogy for Women's Voices, and his "Te Deum laudamus."

Most of his musical work was completely original, although he made a handful of arrangements of American folksongs and a few adaptations of works by Romantic-era composers. Several Bright pieces were settings of poems by Percy Bysshe Shelley, such as "Lament of the Enchantress," "Winter Night on the Mountain," and "Clouds that Veil the Midnight Moon." His choral works also put to music texts by various nineteenth-century British and American poets (among them Tennyson, Thomas Hood, Emily Brontë, Christina Rossetti, Felicia Hemans, Henry Wadsworth Longfellow, and William Cullen Bryant). Other works set sacred Christian liturgical texts (such as his "Kyrie Eleison," "Benedictus and Hosanna," and "Antiphonal Gloria"); still others set Bright's own original lyrics (including "Premonition," "Rainsong," and "Summer Evening").

Houston Bright composed, on commission, numerous pieces for school choruses as well as for college and festival choirs in several states. In so doing, he wrote largely with student singers and journeyman musicians in mind. Yet, according to Nick Strimple of the USC Thornton School of Music, Bright "created several little pieces that have stood the test of time, the musical content making them still appropriate for university and community choruses…"

Citing Bright's Four Sacred Songs for the Night as ranking among his favorites in the choral repertory, Dr. Floyd Slotterback, choral director and professor of music at Northern Michigan University, told an interviewer in March 2001: "Certain pieces kind of stick… I really enjoyed those Houston Bright pieces; the pieces sing well; he treats the voice very nicely. And they're very attractive; I think they'll please people… Good repertoire is just good repertoire, period."

Similarly, in singling out "Lament of the Enchantress," Forrest Daniel, director of the Sisters (Oregon) Community Chorus, observed: "Shelley and Houston Bright, two very good artists. Houston Bright didn't really get his due. He lived in this little town in Texas and he had this magnificent talent."
