= Halsey Stevens =

American classical composer

Halsey Stevens (December 3, 1908 – January 20, 1989) was a music professor, biographer, and composer of American music.

== Life ==
Halsey Stevens was born in Scott, New York and educated at Syracuse University and the University of California, Berkeley. He studied with William Berwald at Syracuse and with the composer Ernest Bloch at Berkeley.

Stevens served as a faculty member at Syracuse University (1935–1937), Dakota Wesleyan University (1937–1941), Bradley University (1941–1946), the University of Redlands (1946), and then at the University of Southern California from 1946 until his retirement in 1976. His notable students there included Charles Lloyd, Houston Bright, Benjamin Lees, Morten Lauridsen, and Williametta Spencer. See: List of music students by teacher: R to S#Halsey Stevens.

He died in a Long Beach, California, medical facility on January 20, 1989, after a long battle with Parkinson's disease.

== Music ==
His recorded music includes, in chronological order of composition:

- "Go, Lovely Rose," for mixed chorus (SATB) a cappella (1942)
- Quintet for Flute, Piano, Violin, Viola, and Cello (1945)
- Symphony No. 1 (1945)
- Three Inventions for Piano (1948)
- Sonata for French Horn and Piano (1953)
- Triskelion, for orchestra (1953)
- Five Duos for Two Cellos (1954)
- Intrada for Piano (1954)
- "Like as the Culver on the Barèd Bough," for mixed chorus (SSATB) a cappella (1954)
- Partita for Harpsichord (1954)
- The Ballad of William Sycamore, for mixed chorus (SATB) and orchestra (1955)
- Sonata for Trumpet and Piano (1956)
- Sonata Piacevole for recorder and harpsichord (1956)
- Sinfonia Breve, for orchestra (1957)
- Symphonic Dances (1958)
- Sonata for [Unaccompanied] Cello (1958)
- Sonatina for Tuba [or Bass Trombone] and Piano (1960)
- Sonata for Trombone and Piano (1965)
- Campion Suite, for mixed chorus (SATB) a cappella (1967)
- Concerto for Clarinet and String Orchestra (1969)

along with many other works.

Among his chamber works, Stevens's 1956 trumpet sonata remains a particular favorite, having been commercially recorded by over a half-dozen trumpeters, including Giuseppe Galante, Jouko Harjanne, David Hickman, Wynton Marsalis, Anthony Plog, Scott Thornburg, and George Vosburgh.

A present-day music reviewer, Osvaldo Polatkan, sought in 2008 to convey something of the composer's models, influences, and mature style thus:

Stevens composed music that was essentially tonal but not without modern influences, particularly Stravinsky and Copland. Though undeniably "American" in his musical language, the European sway is tangible. Stevens himself has acknowledged the pivotal influence of Bela Bartók... He has also stated that Brahms, Hindemith, Prokofiev, Mozart, Johann Sebastian Bach, and, to a lesser extent, Ravel and Schoenberg had served as important models for his music.

== Writings ==
A Bartók scholar and musicologist, Stevens wrote a definitive study of the Hungarian composer, The Life and Music of Béla Bartók (Oxford University Press, 1953; revised edition, 1964). "Mr. Stevens' book... makes one want to rehear the Bartok works in the light of what the author has found in them," observed eminent fellow composer Aaron Copland. "That is praise indeed for any book on music."

Stevens also contributed scholarly articles to Musical Quarterly, The Journal of Music Theory, Music and Letters (London), Tempo (London), Énekszós (Budapest), Musikoloski Zborník (Ljubljana), among other journals.

== Sources ==
- Composer biography at Halsey Stevens.com. Accessed November 15, 2012.
