= Cecil Cohen =

American composer (1894–1967)

Charles Cohen
- Born: April 27, 1894; Chicago, Illinois, U.S.
- Died: November 30, 1967 (aged 73); Washington, D.C., U.S.
- Education: Fisk University; Oberlin Conservatory of Music
- Occupations: Pianist, Composer, Professor
- Years active: 1921–1967
- Employer: Howard University
- Known for: Compositions, teaching at Howard University
- Notable work: "Death of an Old Seaman"

Charles Cecil Cohen (April 27, 1894 – November 30, 1967) was an American pianist, composer, and long-time faculty member of the Howard University piano department.

== Early life and education ==
Cohen was born in Chicago, Illinois on April 27, 1894 to John, an order clerk, and Flora. After John's death in 1906, Cohen and his mother moved in with their cousin Julia until he enrolled at Fisk University in 1910 to study piano.

Cohen started at the Oberlin Conservatory in 1914, where he received his bachelor's degree in piano three years later in 1917. In those years, Cohen would come home to Chicago to give recitals and accompany singers; one critic remarked after a recital with Maude Roberts in 1915: “Mr. C. Cecil Cohen showed excellent training and technique, a love and eagerness for his work. He is indeed a very promising young pianist of unusual attainments.”

== Career ==
After receiving his degree, Cohen taught in Snowhill, Alabama, but was drafted into the army in 1918 to fight in World War I, serving in the 365th Infantry and ultimately on the front lines in France with the American Expeditionary Force until he was honorably discharged on April 1, 1919. Cohen moved to Washington, D.C. in 1921 to join the music faculty at Howard University as instructor of piano where he taught for the rest of his life. He was granted tenure in 1925 and became head of the piano department in 1934 until his formal retirement in 1959; he remained professor emeritus and continued teaching on a year-to-year basis, but grew ill in 1966 and died a year later on November 30, 1967 from heart ailments.

=== Compositions ===
While teaching at Howard University, Cohen composed several songs that were performed by prominent black singers of the day, but only three of his songs were ever published, and only "Death of an Old Seaman" is still in circulation today. His songs "Four Winds" and "Epitaph for a Poet" were published by Edward B Marks Publishing in 1946 as part of an anthology compiled by Edgar Clark titled “Negro art songs: album by contemporary composers, for voice and piano.”

Baritone Todd Duncan, Cohen's colleague at Howard University, premiered several of the composer's songs. In March 1937, Duncan and the Howard University Glee Club were invited to a state dinner thrown by President Franklin D. Roosevelt and his wife Eleanor for Canadian Governor General John Buchan and his wife Susan Buchan, among others. At this dinner, Duncan performed Cohen's song "Death of an Old Seaman," accompanied by the composer at the piano. At his concert at the Town Hall in New York City on March 8, 1944, Duncan performed "As at thy portals also Death"; music critic Nora Holt found the song “worthy of mention” in her review of the concert, commenting it was “composed in a tragic vein...and was rendered with great feeling by Mr. Duncan."

Soprano Dorothy Maynor sang "Epitaph for a Poet" in a concert recorded live at the Library of Congress on December 18, 1940, accompanied by Arpád Sándor.

== Known compositions ==
- Death of an Old Seaman, written in 1936, published 1977, text by Langston Hughes
- Epitaph for a Poet, 1942, text by Countee Cullen
- Four Winds, 1942, text by Sara Teasdale
- As at Thy Portals also Death, dated 1943, unpublished, text by Walt Whitman
- Let's Say Goodbye, unpublished, text by Georgia Douglas Johnson
- Just a Song, unpublished
- If You Should Go, unpublished
