= List of African-American women in classical music =

This is a list of African-American women in classical music. African-American women who are notable in various fields of classical music are listed here.

== Composers ==
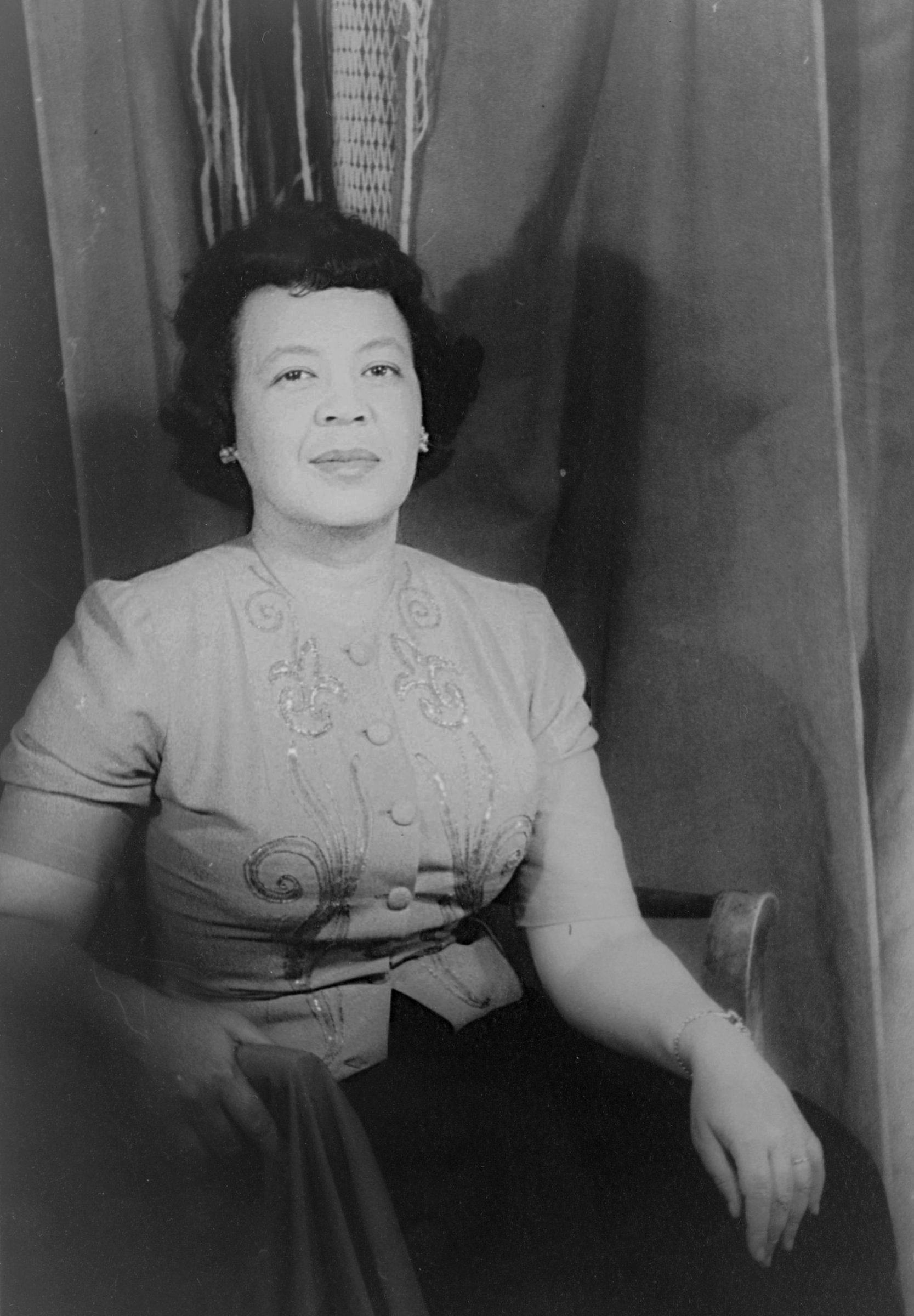
- Portrait of Margaret Bonds.
  Lettie Alston (born 1953), composer
- Regina Harris Baiocchi (born 1956), composer, writer and educator
- Jasmine Arielle Barnes (born 1991), composer and singer
- Margaret Bonds (1913–1972), composer and pianist
- B. E. Boykin, composer, conductor, and pianist
- Valerie Coleman, composer and flutist
- Shirley Graham Du Bois (1896–1977), composer, author and activist
- Frances Gotay (1865-1932), composer
- Helen Eugenia Hagan (1891–1964), composer and pianist
- Nora Holt (1884–1974), composer, singer and music critic
- Betty Jackson King (1928–1994), composer, singer, pianist and educator
- Cynthia Cozette Lee (born 1953), composer and librettist
- Tania León (born 1943), composer and educator
- Lena McLin (born 1928), composer, author, pastor and educator
- Jessie Montgomery (born 1982), composer and chamber musician
- Dorothy Rudd Moore (born 1940), composer and educator
- Undine Smith Moore (1904–1989), composer, pianist and educator
- Joyce Solomon Moorman (born 1946), composer and educator
- Nkeiru Okoye (born 1972), composer
- Julia Perry (1924–1979), composer and educator
- Zenobia Powell Perry (1908–2004), composer, activist and educator
- Evelyn La Rue Pittman (1910–1992), composer
- Rosephanye Powell (born 1962), composer, singer and academic
- Florence Price (1887–1953), composer, pianist and educator
- Irene Britton Smith (1907–1999), composer and educator

== Conductors ==
- Kalena Bovell, African-American and Hispanic conductor
- Yvette Devereaux (born 1940), conductor and violinist
- Margaret Rosezarian Harris (1943–2000) conductor, composer, educator and pianist.
- Eva Jessye (1895–1992), choral conductor, composer and educator
- Nina Gamble Kennedy (born 1960), conductor, filmmaker, pianist and writer
- Marsha Mabrey (born 1949), conductor, educator and violinist
- Kay George Roberts (born 1950), conductor and educator

== Educators ==
- Harriet Gibbs Marshall (1868–1941), educator, writer and creator of the Washington Conservatory of Music and School of Expression
- Rebecca Walker Steele (1925–2019), educator, singer and choir director

== Instrumentalists ==
- Velvet Brown, tuba player and educator
- Ezinma (born 1991), violinist and composer
- Nokuthula Ngwenyama (born 1976), violinist and composer
- Ann Hobson Pilot (born 1943), harpist
- Sonya Robinson (born 1959), violinist
- Carolyn Utz (1913–2005), bassist and conductor

== Opera singers ==
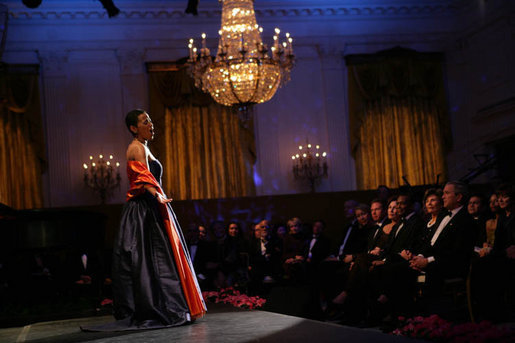
- Harolyn Blackwell performs in the East Room of the White House
  Adele Addison (born 1925), operatic soprano also performing in recitals and concerts
- Roberta Alexander (1949–2025), international operatic soprano
- Betty Allen (1927–2009), mezzo-soprano who performed in concerts and operas from the 1950s and later served as an educator
- Marian Anderson (1897–1993), singer of classical music and spirituals, including opera
- Martina Arroyo (1936―2026), major international operatic soprano
- Kathleen Battle (born 1948), operatic soprano and concert performer
- Harolyn Blackwell (born 1955), lyric coloratura soprano who has performed in many of the world's leading opera houses
- Angel Blue (1984), operatic soprano and classical crossover artist
- Angela Brown (born 1963), operatic soprano admired for performances of Verdi heroines
- Débria Brown (1936–2001), operatic mezzo-soprano and educator
- Janai Brugger (born 1983), operatic soprano performing in leading roles in several opera companies
- Hazel Joan Bryant (1939–1983), actress, opera singer, director and playwright
- Grace Bumbry (born 1937-2023), leading mezzo-soprano of her generation
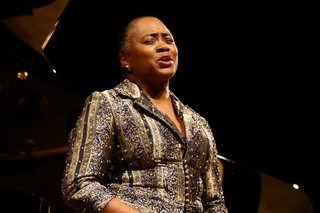
  Barbara Hendricks at the Festiwalu Dialogu Czterech Kultur, Łódź, Poland.
- Karla Burns (1954–2021), operatic mezzo-soprano and actress
- Alyson Cambridge (fl. 2000s), operatic soprano, classical and jazz concert singer and actress
- Cynthia Clarey (born 1949), operatic soprano and mezzo-soprano and classical concert performer
- Barbara Smith Conrad (1937–2017), operatic mezzo-soprano and educator
- Michèle Crider (born 1959), international lirico spinto soprano appearing in leading opera houses
- Clamma Dale (born 1948), international operatic soprano and concert performer acclaimed for her portrayal of Bess
- Billie Lynn Daniel (fl. 1960s), operatic soprano best known for performing Clara in Porgy and Bess
- Ellabelle Davis (1907–1960), operatic soprano remembered for performing Aida in the 1940s
- Gloria Davy (1931–2012), operatic soprano and concert singer who settled in Switzerland
- Mary Cardwell Dawson (1894–1962), musician, educator and founding director of the National Negro Opera Company
- Mattiwilda Dobbs (1925–2015), coloratura soprano, early international African-American performer
- Ruby Elzy (1908–1943), pioneering short-lived African-American operatic soprano
- Lillian Evanti (1890–1967), classical concert performer and opera singer who gained fame in France
- Maria Ewing (born 1950), operatic soprano and mezzo-soprano, classical and jazz concert performer
- Cassandra Extavour (fl. 2000s), Canadian geneticist and classical soprano singer
- Wilhelmenia Fernandez aka Wilhelmenia Wiggins Fernandez, soprano, actress. (1949 – 2024)
- Zelma Watson George (1903–1994), philanthropist, musician and opera singer
- Gail Varina Gilmore (born 1950), gospel and mezzo-soprano opera singer, known for performing Kundry in Wagner's Parsifal
- Denyce Graves (born 1964), operatic mezzo-soprano known for performing the title roles in Carmen and Samson and Delilah
- Elizabeth Greenfield (c. 1820–1876), best known African-American concert singer of her times, also conductor and educator
- Reri Grist (born 1932), major international coloratura soprano and concert performer
- Cynthia Haymon (born 1958), soprano who has performed in opera and modern classical works
- Barbara Hendricks (born 1948), operatic soprano and concert singer who has settled in Switzerland
- Caterina Jarboro (1898–1986), pioneering African-American opera singer who performed the title role in Aida in 1933
- Betty Jones (1930–2019), operatic spinto soprano who performed in the 1970s
- Isola Jones (born 1949), mezzo-soprano opera singer and educator
- Sissieretta Jones (c.1869–1933), successful classical soprano who performed for American presidents and the British royal family
- Jonita Lattimore (fl. 1990s), soprano and educator who has performed in operatic roles and oratorio engagements
- Marquita Lister (born 1961), operatic soprano known for performing Bess in Porgy and Bess as well as Aida and Salome
- Marvis Martin (born 1956), operatic soprano best known for her concert performances and recitals
- Myra Merritt (fl. 1980s), operatic soprano and educator
- Abbie Mitchell (1884–1960), operatic soprano who performed Clara in the première of Porgy and Bess
- Latonia Moore (born 1979), classical soprano who has performed with leading opera companies
- Jessye Norman (1945–2019), celebrated dramatic soprano who performed leading roles in opera and sang in recitals
- Ailyn Pérez (born 1979), operatic soprano known for her interpretation of Violetta, Mimi and Thaïs
- Jillian Patricia Pirtle (born 1983), operatic soprano
- Leontyne Price (born 1927), internationally acclaimed soprano at the Metropolitan Opera
- Florence Quivar (born 1944), operatic mezzo-soprano who gave over 100 performance at the Metropolitan Opera
- La Julia Rhea (1898–1992), pioneering African-American operatic soprano who performed in Chicago from 1937
- Marie Selika Williams (1849–1937), coloratura soprano, the first African American to perform at the White House
- Murial Smith (1923–1985), singer who starred in musical theatre and opera from the 1940s
- Florence Cole Talbert (1890–1961), operatic soprano, music educator and musician
- Shirley Verrett (1931–2010), operatic mezzo-soprano known for singing works of Verdi and Donizetti from the late 1960s
- Felicia Weathers (born 1937), international soprano opera and concert singer
- Camilla Williams (1919–2012), operatic soprano and educator who performed nationally and internationally
- Ivory Winston (1911–1996), coloratura soprano, "Iowa's First Lady of Song"

== Pianists ==
- Margaret Bonds (1913–1972), early composer and pianist
- Valerie Capers (born 1935), classical and jazz pianist, and composer
- Helen Eugenia Hagan (1891–1964), pianist, educator and composer
- Hazel Harrison (1883–1969), concert pianist
- Anne Gamble Kennedy (1920–2001), pianist, accompanist and educator
- Nina Gamble Kennedy (born 1960), pianist, conductor, filmmaker and writer
- Cornelia Lampton (1896-1928), pianist and educator
- Margaret Patrick (1913–1994), member of the Ebony and Ivory duo
- Philippa Schuyler (1931–1967), child prodigy, concert pianist and journalist
- Francesca "Frankye" A. Dixon (1915–1996), concert pianist

== See also ==
- Lists of women in music
- List of classic female blues singers
