= Church of Lord =

Church of Lord may refer to:

- Bible Way Church of Our Lord Jesus Christ, two Pentecostal denominations which were originally one
- Church of Our Lord (Victoria, British Columbia), a Reformed Episcopal Church parish
- Church of Our Lord Jesus Christ of the Apostolic Faith, a Pentecostal denomination
- Church of Our Lord of Socorro, magnificent 18th century baroque style temple located in Labruja, Ponte de Lima
- Church of the Lord (Aladura), African Initiated Church
- Church of the Lord Jesus (Calcutta), Catholic church located at Taltala
- Church of the Lord Jesus Christ, church organization with its headquarters located in Philadelphia, Pennsylvania
