= Helen Walker-Hill =

Canadian pianist and musicologist (1936–2013)

- Born: Helen Siemens; May 26, 1936; Winnipeg, Manitoba, Canada
- Died: August 8, 2013 (aged 77) Boulder, Colorado, U.S.
- Occupations: Pianist, musicologist

Helen Walker-Hill (née Siemens; May 26, 1936 – August 8, 2013) was a Canadian pianist and musicologist who specialised in the music of Black women composers.

== Life ==
Helen Walker-Hill was born on May 26, 1936, in Winnipeg, Manitoba, Canada. She received her early musical training from her mother, Margaret Siemens, and continued piano studies with Emma Endres Kountz in Toledo, Ohio. She received her Bachelor of Arts degree from the University of Toledo in 1957. She was a Fulbright fellow and studied with Nadia Boulanger at the École Normale de Musique de Paris in France, graduating in 1958.

She earned a Master of Arts in musicology from Smith College in 1965 and a Doctor of Musical Arts in piano performance from the University of Colorado in 1981, where from 1983 to 1990 she was assistant professor adjunct on the piano faculty. From 1993 to 1998 she was a visiting assistant professor at the University of Wyoming. She also taught at Muhlenberg College.

Walker-Hill was married to the composer George Walker from 1960 to 1975. They had two sons, the violinist and composer Gregory T.S. Walker and the playwright Ian Walker. From 1981 to 1991 she was married to Robert Hadley Hill.

== Career ==
From 1987 on, Walker-Hill dedicated herself to uncovering music by Black women composers to use in her performance and teaching. She was awarded a 1995–96 Scholar-in-Residence Fellowship at the Schomburg Center for Research in Black Culture in New York City. In 1998 Walker-Hill was a Rockefeller fellow at the Center for Black Music Research (CBMR), Columbia College.

Her lecture "Rediscovering Heritage: The Music of Black Women Composers" was widely published and was featured on NPR. She compiled and edited the 1992 anthology Black Women Composers: A Century of Piano Music, 1893-1990; the volume contains scores and biographical information for Estelle Ricketts, Anna Gardner Goodwin, L. Viola Kinney, Amanda Aldridge, Florence Price, Mary Lou Williams, Julia Perry, Undine Smith Moore, Betty Jackson King, Philippa Schuyler, Tania León, Margaret Bonds, Lena McLin, Valerie Capers, Regina Harris Baiocchi, Dorothy Rudd Moore, Joyce Solomon Moorman, Maple Bailey, and Zenobia Powell Perry.

In 1992, Greenwood Press published Walker-Hill’s Piano Music by Black Women Composers: A Catalog of Solo and Ensemble Works. She and her son Gregory Walker recorded the album Kaleidoscope: Music of Black American Women in 1995. She edited the Vivace Press series Music by African American Women and published four volumes of music: pieces by Rachel Eubanks (two volumes, Vivace, 1995, and Hildegard, 2003), by Nora Holt (Vivace, 2001), and by Irene Britton Smith (Vivace, 2001). In 2002, she published her landmark study From Spirituals to Symphonies: African-American Women Composers and Their Music.

She donated the bulk of her collection of taped interviews with composers, scores, photos, and other research materials to the CBMR Library and Archives as the Helen Walker-Hill Collection. In 2005 the CBMR received a $94,000 grant from the National Endowment for the Humanities to compile a detailed finding aid to the Helen Walker-Hill Collection as part of a project to inventory the papers of three major women scholars: Eileen Southern, Dena Epstein, and Helen Walker-Hill. In 2006, Walker-Hill consulted with the CBMR on the production of a concert of piano, vocal, and chamber works from her collection. The American Music Research Center at the University of Colorado Boulder also holds materials and organizes performances of the music.

== Works ==
=== Books ===
- Piano Music by Black Women Composers: A Catalog of Solo and Ensemble Works. Greenwood Press, 1992 (ISBN 9780313064722)
- Black Women Composers: A Century of Piano Music 1983-1990 (with Montague Ring). Hildegard Publishing, 1992
- Music by Black Women Composers: A Biography of Available Scores. CBMR Monographs, 1995 (ISBN 9780929911045)
- Walker-Hill, Helen (2002). From Spirituals to Symphonies: African-American Women Composers and Their Music. CBMR Monographs (1st ed.). Westport: Greenwood Press. ISBN 978-0-313-28141-9. OCLC 47690158.
  - Walker-Hill, Helen (2007) [2002]. From Spirituals to Symphonies: African-American Women Composers and Their Music (2nd ed.). Urbana: University of Illinois Press. ISBN 978-0-252-07454-7. OCLC 71369367.

=== Chapters ===
- Walker-Hill, Helen (1999). "Rachel Eubanks". In Floyd Jr., Samuel A. (ed.). International Dictionary of Black Composers. Vol. 1. Chicago: Center for Black Music Research. ISBN 978-1-884964-27-5. OCLC 41333249.

=== Recordings ===
- Kaleidoscope: Music by African-American Women (with Gregory Walker) (Leonarda: LE 339, 1995)
