= Mother church =

Concept in Christianity

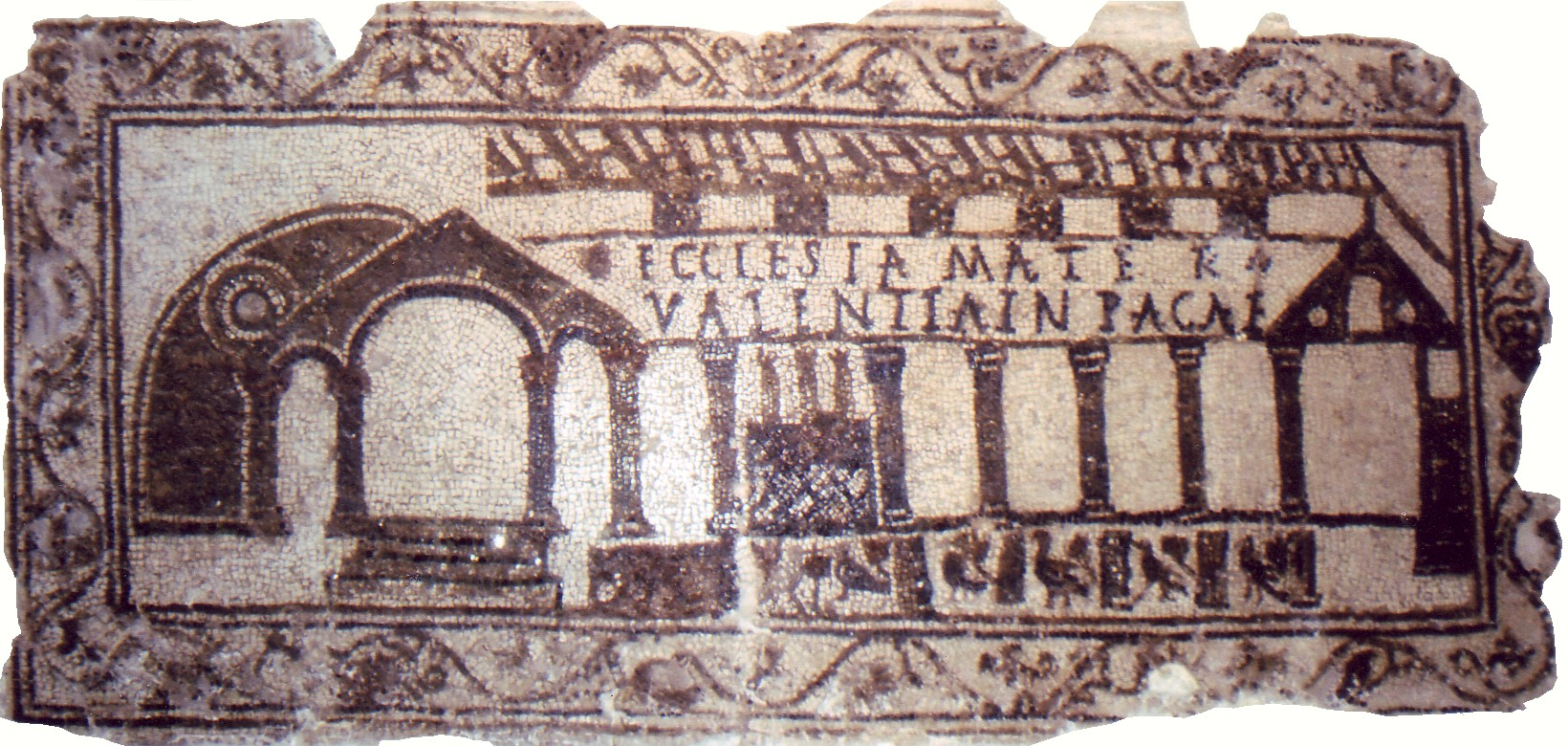
Mother church architecturally represented in a mosaic of a fifth-century chapel floor (tomb marker/cover of a certain Valentia with the added invocation to rest in peace: Valentia in Pace). Bardo Museum, Tunis.

Mother church or matrice is a term depicting the Christian Church as a mother in her functions of nourishing and protecting the believer. It may also refer to the primary church of a Christian denomination or diocese, i.e. a cathedral church, or the oldest church of a particular locality. For a particular individual, one's mother church is the church in which one received the sacrament of baptism. The term has specific meanings within different Christian traditions. Catholics refer to the Catholic Church as "Holy Mother Church".

== Church as an organization ==
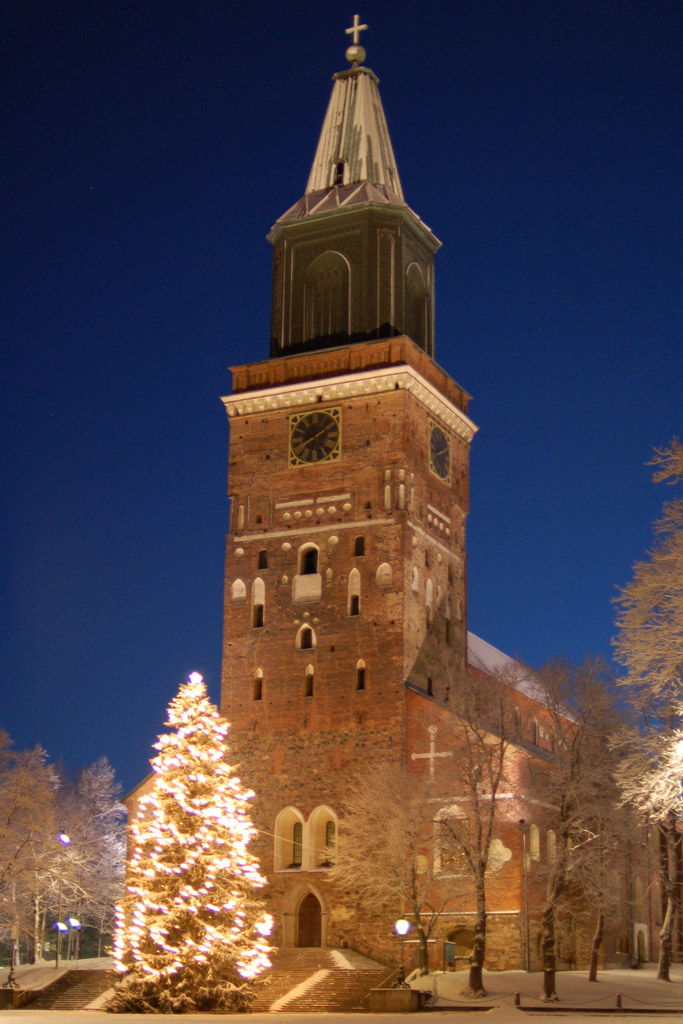
Turku Cathedral, the Mother Church of the Evangelical Lutheran Church of Finland

=== Primatial local churches ===
The "first see", or primatial see, of a regional or national church is sometimes referred to as the mother church of that nation. For example, Armagh is the primatial see of Ireland, because it was the first established local church in that country. Similarly, Rome is the primatial see of Italy, and Baltimore of the United States, and so on.

The first local church in all of Christianity is that of Jerusalem, the site of the Passion of the Christ and of Pentecost, making it the Mother Church of all Christianity.

=== Catholic Church ===
This term is most often used among Catholics as Holy Mother Church. The Church is considered to be a mother to her members because she is the Bride of Christ, and all because the Church is considered the mother of believers just as God is called the Father of believers. Another term used in the Catechism is the title "Mater et Magistra" (Mother and Teacher). Pope John XXIII made this the title of his encyclical celebrating the seventieth year after Leo XIII's groundbreaking social encyclical, explaining that in this Mother and Teacher all nations "should find ... their own completeness in a higher order of living." Pope Francis said:

The Church is our mother. She is our "Holy Mother Church" that is generated through our baptism, makes us grow up in her community and has that motherly attitude, of meekness and goodness: Our Mother Mary and our Mother Church know how to caress their children and show tenderness. To think of the Church without that motherly feeling is to think of a rigid association, an association without human warmth, an orphan.

=== Anglican Communion ===
In Anglicanism, the Church of England gave rise to all the other Churches in the Anglican Communion, and as such she is considered the Mother Church. The Archbishop of Canterbury thus serves as the focus of unity within the Anglican Communion.

=== Methodist Church ===
In Methodism, the Methodist Church of Great Britain is considered the Mother Church by all the other Methodist Churches in the World Methodist Council, with Methodist Central Hall often being a symbol of this tradition. This is because the Methodist Church of Great Britain "gave birth to the whole Methodist enterprise and then of a nineteenth-century church whose influence reached out across the world through the missionary endeavors of the various British Connexions within and beyond the British Empire."

=== Apostolic Sees or Ecclesia matrix ===
Apostolic sees are those local churches founded by one of the Twelve Apostles or Paul the Apostle. In 1855 Bingham wrote: "Ecclesia matrix, a mother-church, is sometimes taken for an original church planted immediately by the Apostles, whence others were derived and propagated afterward. ...And in this sense the Church of Jerusalem is called 'the mother-church of all churches in the world.'"

He also refers to "Arles the mother church of France, supposedly planted by the Apostle's missionary Trophimus, first bishop of the place."

== Church as a building ==
=== Place of baptism ===
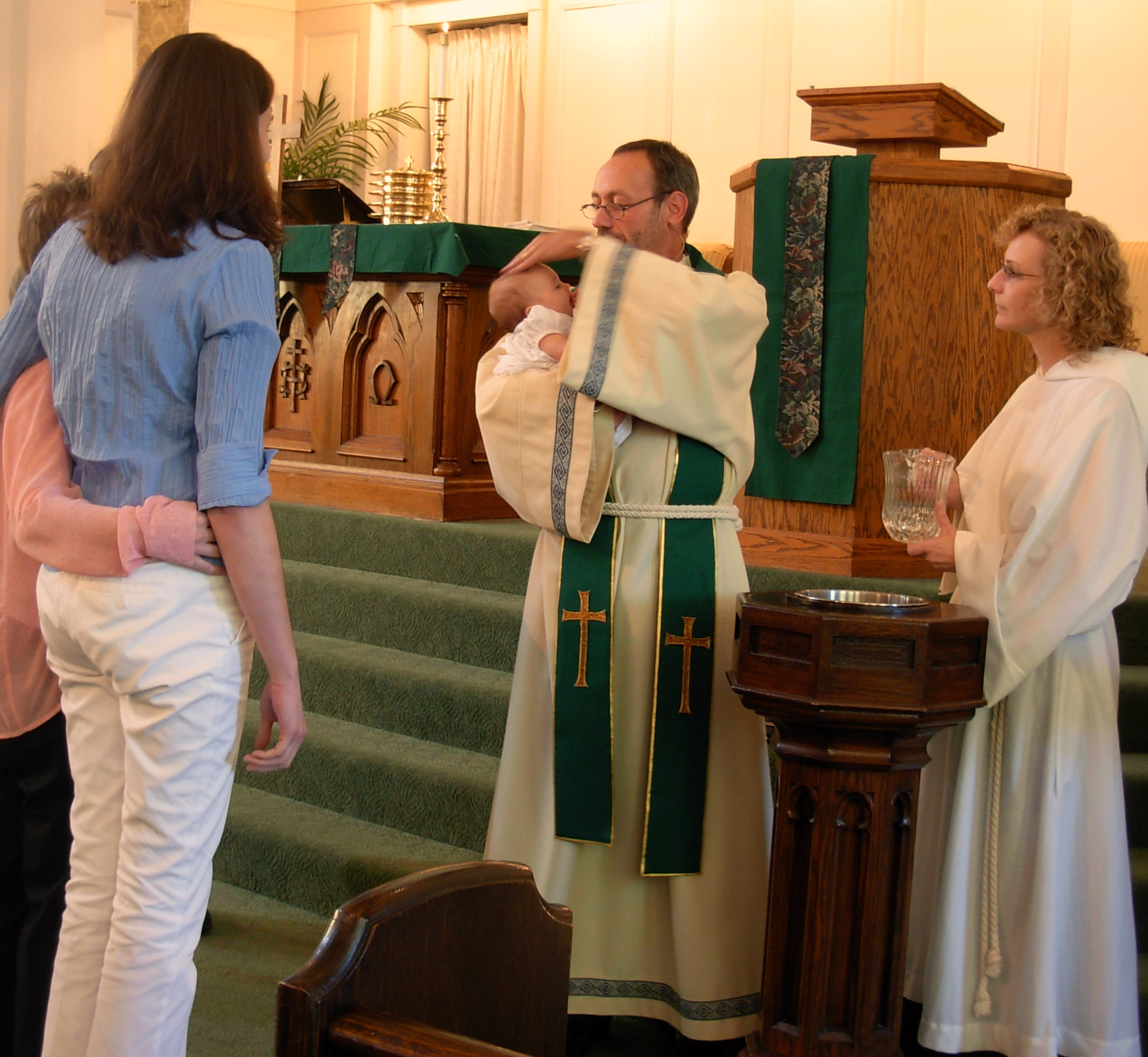
On Mothering Sunday, people historically have visited the church in which they were baptized.

For a particular individual, one's mother church is the church at which one received the Christian sacrament of baptism (christening). In the British Isles, Mothering Sunday is the traditional day in which one visits one's mother church.

=== Church of the Resurrection ===
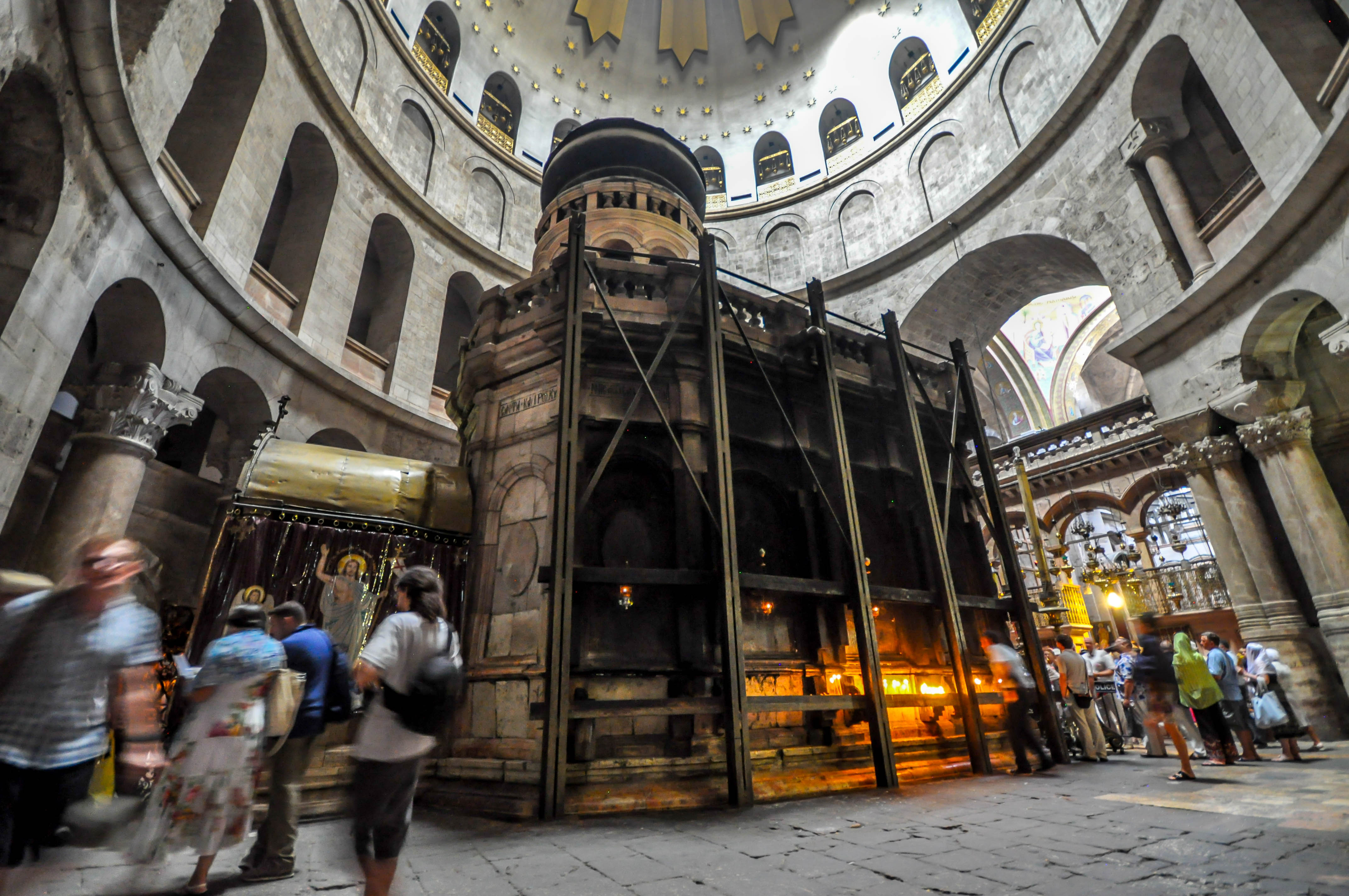
The Aedicule, before its restoration, encloses the tomb of Jesus, in the Church of the Holy Sepulchre in Jerusalem

The Mother Church of Christianity is the Church of the Holy Sepulchre in Jerusalem, the traditional site of the most important events in the religion. Within are the holiest spots of Christianity, chiefly, the place of Jesus' crucifixion, death, burial, and resurrection.

=== Cathedral ===
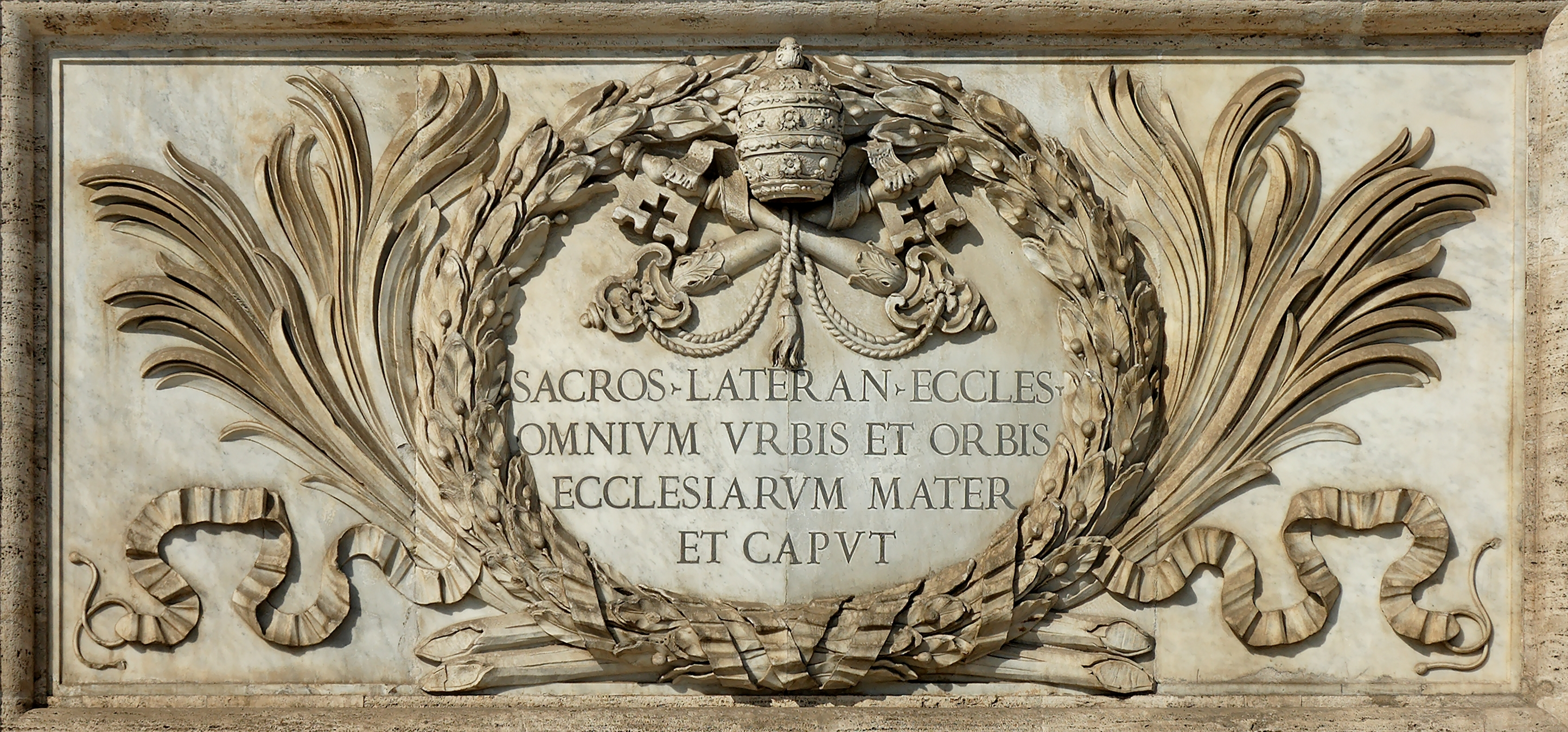
"Most Holy Lateran Church, of all the churches in the city and the world, the mother and head" ("Sacros[ancta] Lateran[ensis] eccles[ia] omnium urbis et orbis ecclesiarum mater et caput"). Inscription on the façade of the Archbasilica of Saint John Lateran in Rome.

"Mother church" may also be a title of distinction based on a church's hierarchical importance. The church of the bishop of an episcopal see is often considered the mother church of the diocese. Holy Name Cathedral in Chicago, Illinois, falls under this category. While it was not the first Catholic cathedral of the city, it became the mother church due to the presence of the episcopal cathedra. This form of distinction based on hierarchical importance is usually used by the Catholic Church, and, sometimes, the churches of the Lutheran World Federation and Anglican Communion, while other Protestant denominations tend to refrain from using the title in this manner.

The pope's cathedral, the Papal Archbasilica of Saint John Lateran, is called Sacrosancta Lateranensis ecclesia omnium urbis et orbis ecclesiarum mater et caput ("Most Holy Lateran Church, Mother and Head of all the churches in the city and the world").

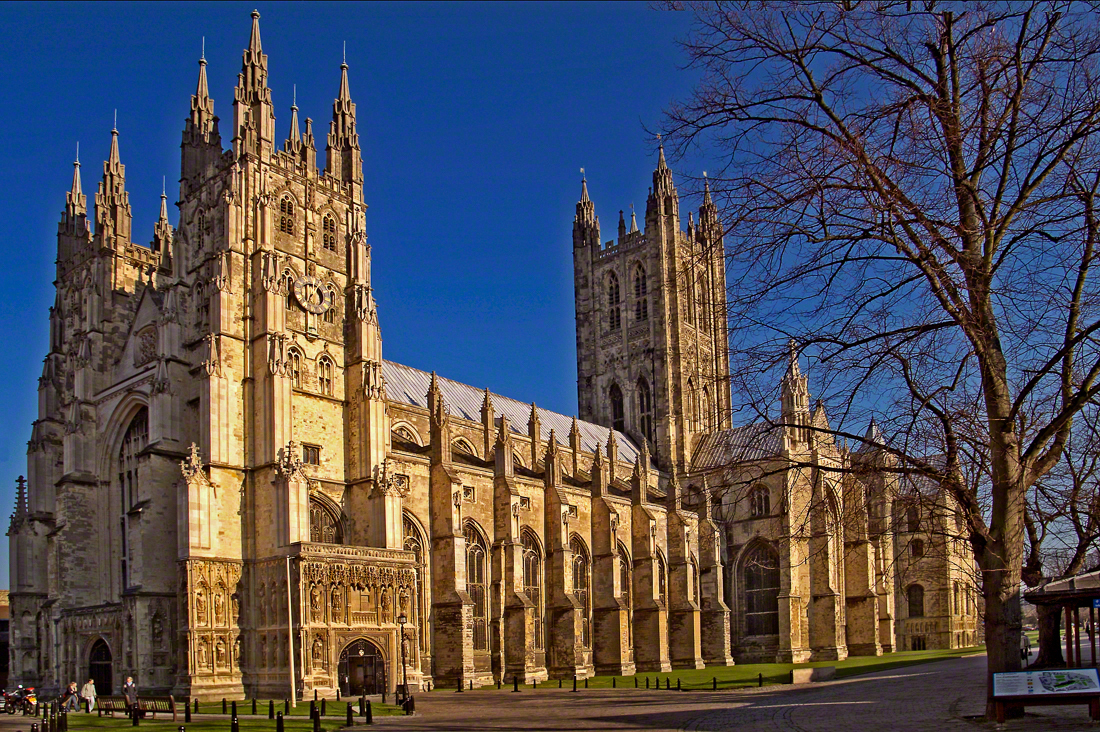
Canterbury Cathedral, mother church of the Anglican Communion

Canterbury Cathedral, seat of the Archbishop of Canterbury, describes itself as the "Mother Church of the worldwide Anglican Communion".

=== First mission church ===
The first church built in a mission area is sometimes called the mother church. For example, the Cathedral of Our Lady of Peace in Honolulu, Hawaii, was the site of the first French Catholic mission of the Congregation of the Sacred Hearts of Jesus and Mary, from which the modern Hawaii Catholic Church was established. Under these circumstances it is today considered the mother church of all Hawaii. Similarly, the Mission San Carlos Borromeo in Carmel, California, is considered the mother church of California, as it historically served as the headquarters of the California mission system.

=== Principal church of a religious institute ===
The term may also relate to the churches of the various religious institutes, royal orders, or civic orders. For example, Madonna Della Strada Chapel became the mother church of the province of Chicago of the Society of Jesus (Jesuits), as the principal church of the Jesuits in its particular province including Illinois, Indiana, Kentucky, and Ohio. On a broader scale, the Chiesa del Gesù in Rome is the mother church of all Jesuits throughout the world as it is the church of the Society's Superior General.

=== Plantation churches ===
Another form of the phrase is mainly used in Protestant churches. A mother church is one from which other "daughter churches" were planted nearby.

=== Historically significant churches ===
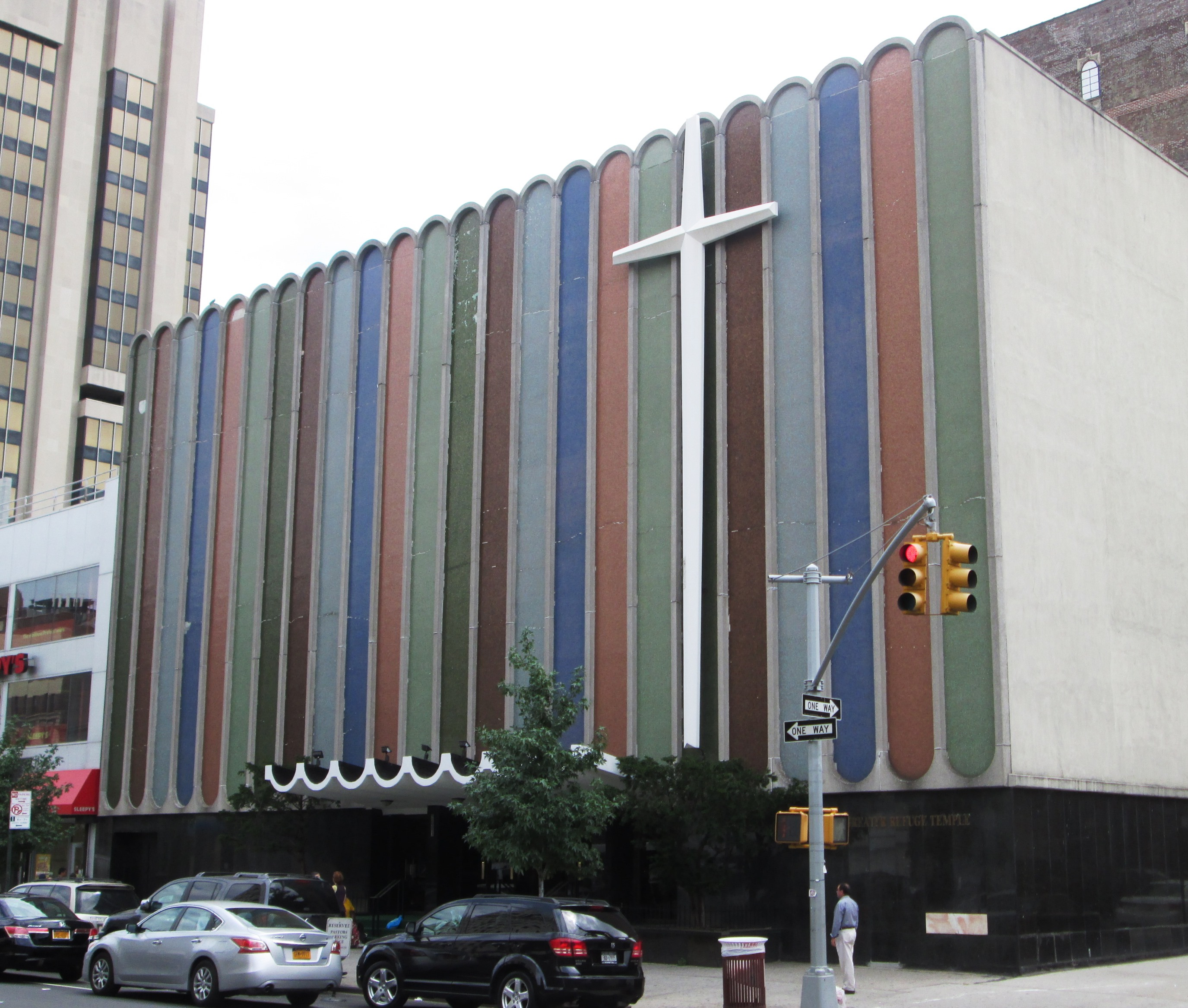
The Greater Refuge Temple in Harlem, New York City, the mother church of the Pentecostal Church of Our Lord Jesus Christ of the Apostolic Faith

The oldest churches of various religious communities are often considered the mother churches to others that follow either in that same tradition or, alternatively, in a reformist tradition. A church's hierarchical importance is often derived from its historical importance in its organization. In addition, in communities where churches may change their ecclesiastical association or become independent (particularly in Pentecostal, charismatic, and nondenominational churches in America), a mother church may have daughter churches in one or more organizations.

The mother church in Christian Science is The First Church of Christ, Scientist in Boston, the Church of Christ Scientist, of which all others are branches. Per the Manual of The Mother Church, the legal title of the mother church is "The First Church of Christ, Scientist," and while its branch churches may call themselves First Church of Christ, Scientist, or Second Church of Christ, Scientist, etc., they are prohibited from using "The" in front of their names. Only The Mother Church can do so.

Greater Refuge Temple Church in New York City is the mother church of the Church of Our Lord Jesus Christ of the Apostolic Faith, an Apostolic Pentecostal denomination. As such, it is also ultimately the mother church of its various offshoot churches and organizations, including both Bible Way organizations and the Church of the Lord Jesus Christ and its daughter churches. In addition, churches that were independently founded by ministers who were ordained or directly influenced by the church's founder, Robert C. Lawson, or his spiritual successor, William L. Bonner, may also look to Greater Refuge Temple as their mother church, including the Progressive Church of Our Lord Jesus Christ, the Evangelistic Church of Christ, and many others.
