= Natalie Hinderas =

American musician

Natalie Leota Henderson Hinderas (June 15, 1927 – July 22, 1987) was an American pianist, composer and professor at Pennsylvania's Temple University.

Hinderas was born in Oberlin, Ohio to a musical family. Her father (Abram) was a jazz pianist and her mother, Leota Palmer, was a classical pianist who taught at the Cleveland Institute of Music. She began playing at the age of three, with formal lessons (piano and violin) beginning at six years of age. A child prodigy, she gave her first full-length recital at eight years old.

In 1945, she received her BS in music from Oberlin Conservatory as their youngest student. Assuming the name Natalie Hinderas, she did her post-graduate work at the Juilliard School of Music with Olga Samaroff and at the Philadelphia Conservatory with Edward Steuermann. In 1954, she made her Town Hall debut, receiving critical acclaim. From this point in her career, she toured America, Europe, and the West Indies; with two tours of Africa and Asia sponsored by the U.S. State Department.

In the mid-1950s, Hinderas signed a contract with NBC to perform in their owned and operated stations around the United States playing recitals, concertos, and variety shows. She was the first Black musician to perform a subscription concert with the Philadelphia Orchestra in 1971 after which, many other concerts followed. Some of the other venues where she played included the Los Angeles Philharmonic Orchestra, the Cleveland, Atlanta, New York, San Francisco, and Chicago Symphony Orchestras. Hinderas's performances included the Schumann Piano Concerto, Gershwin's Rhapsody in Blue, and Rachmaninoff's Concerto No. 2.

Throughout her career, she promoted and recorded works by black performers and composers, among them R. Nathaniel Dett, Thomas Henderson Kerr Jr., William Grant Still, John W. Work, and George Walker. She received a number of awards and degrees including the Martha Baird Rockefeller Fellowship and an honorary doctorate degree from Swarthmore College. Hinderas was a full professor at Temple University at the time of her death from cancer on July 22, 1987.

Hinderas also taught at Howard University, where her pupils included Pearl Williams-Jones.
