= Irene Smith =

Irene Smith may refer to:

- Irene Smith, character in Whatever Happened to Harold Smith?
- Irene Smith (publisher), co-founder of New Writers Press
- Irene Smith (politician), see Socialist Party of Washington
- Irene Britton Smith (1907–1999), American composer

== See also ==
- Rene Smith (disambiguation)
