= Rachel Eubanks =

American composer and pianist (1922–2006)

- Eubanks in 1996
- Born: Rachel Amelia Eubanks; September 12, 1922; San Jose, California
- Died: April 8, 2006 (aged 83); Los Angeles, California
- Education: University of California (B.A. 1945); Columbia University (M.A. 1947); Pacific Western University (D.M.A. 1980)

Rachel Amelia Eubanks (September 12, 1922 – April 8, 2006) was an American composer, pianist and ethnomusicologist.

== Life and career ==
Rachel Amelia Eubanks was born on September 12, 1922 in San Jose, California, US. Her parents, Joseph Sylvester and Elizabeth Amelia Eubanks, struggled during the Great Depression, still managing to take Rachel and her brothers Jonathan and Joseph to the concerts of numerous musicians: Roland Hayes, Paul Robeson and Marian Anderson. Settling in Oakland, California, Eubanks attended Roosevelt Junior High School and later Oakland High School. Eubanks learned both clarinet and alto horn in elementary school, later taking piano lessons. She wrote her first composition at 11 years old; after finishing a poem for Mother's Day, Eubanks considered it incomplete and decided to set it to music. Other early pieces include the works Just You and I and Memories of Mother of Mine. Her first serious work came at age 14: the Waters of the Ganges for piano, inspired by the stories of a family friend who went to India as a missionary.

Eubanks married Mac MacDonald, a Baptist minister, in 1950. Her future plans did not align with the traditional responsibilities for the wife of a pastor and the two divorced in 1952. Eubanks studied at a number of American universities, beginning with University of California, Berkeley, where she studied under Charles Cushing receiving a Bachelor of Arts in composition and music theory in 1945. She then received a Master of Arts, studying composition under Douglas Moore, Otto Luening and Normand Lockwood. Further study included the Eastman School of Music in 1947; Berkeley with Roger Sessions in 1948; organ study at Capitol University from 1949–1950; economics, philosophy and religion at Ohio State University from 1950–1951; film scoring at the University of Southern California with Miklós Rózsa; education and language at California State University, Los Angeles in 1954; various subjects at the University of California, Los Angeles; ethnomusicology at California State University, Long Beach in 1975; music administration at Westminster Choir College in 1976; and a DMA in composition at Pacific Western University. In 1977 Eubanks studied in Paris, France with Nadia Boulanger through the American Conservatory there. (Note: Euabnks was part of numerous African-American women composers who studied with Nadia Boulanger in Paris, including Maude Wanzer Layne, Julia Perry, Evelyn LaRue Pittman, Irene Britton Smith, Dorothy Rudd Moore and possibly Nora Douglas Holt) She received a DMA from the Pacific Western University (1980).

Eubanks headed the Albany State University, Georgia, and she later taught theory and composition and was head of the music department at Wilberforce University 1949–50. After settling in Los Angeles (LA), she began offering piano lessons out of her apartment.

Eubanks founded the Eubanks Conservatory of Music and Art in 1951 as its first director. Based in LA, it "began in modest accommodations on 47th and Figueroa Streets", later upsizing for increased enrollment. In its heydays, the conservatory offered Associate and Masters degrees in music performance, composition, theory and history. Initially a nonprofit organization, the Conservatory diminished in enrollment during the 1990s, repeatedly moved locations and has "never returned to its glory days".

Eubanks died on April 8, 2006 in Los Angeles, California from colon cancer.

== Music ==
Eubanks' compositional œuvre includes piano music, songs, orchestral and choral works.

The Guide to the Pianist's Repertoire included her Five Interludes (1984), describing it as "Tense atonal writing, contrapuntal textures, unified by similar intervals in all pieces." The Canadian pianist Helen Walker-Hill recorded the first and last of the Five Interludes for the 1995 Kaleidoscope: Music by African-American Women album.

Her other works include the Symphonic Requiem for orchestra and four solo voices (1980) as well as a cantata, written for choir and orchestra.

== List of compositions ==
Sources:

- Prelude (1942), piano
- Five Interludes (1982), piano
