= Ian Walker (playwright) =

American dramatist

Ian Walker (born 1964) is an American playwright, cinematographer, designer, producer, director, actor, and advocate for the arts.

== Life ==
Ian Walker is the son of composer George Walker, the first African-American to win the Pulitzer Prize in Music, and music historian Helen Walker-Hill. His brother is violinist and composer Gregory Walker.

Walker is co-founder of the Second Wind Productions, a San Francisco theatre group, and currently serves as playwright-in-residence there. His 1991 play about Dutch art forger Han van Meegeren was the basis for the film, Forger.

In 2013, he started a media production company, Hurricane Images Inc. which produces a wide range of commercial films and videos, including the documentaries "Minstrels and Minimoogs" and "George Walker: Great American Composer", which explored the life of his father, Dr. George Walker, corporate video for non-profits, and music videos with rapper Spice 1 and others.

As a playwright, he is known for his exploration of social and political themes. He describes playwriting as “an attempt to reshape the world. My plays are about trying to get to the moment where people speak the truth. The pursuit of truth in all aspects is wonderfully aggressive and violent." He currently lives in San Francisco.

== Awards ==
He received the International Larry Corse Award in 2006 for The Gravedigger's Tango, and a John Golden Prize in 2000 for Vigilance.

== Plays ==
- The Lullaby Tree (2012)
- The Disappearance of Mary Rosemary (2011)
- The Tender King (2009)
- Meadowland (2008)
- The Gravedigger's Tango (2006)
- Out In Under Over Done (2005/2011)
- A Beautiful Home for the Incurable (2004)
- The Stone Trilogy (2001)
- Ghost in the Light (2000)
- Vigilance (1999)
- Black Lies (1998)
