= Faye Robinson =

American operatic soprano

Faye Robinson (born November 2, 1943) is an African-American soprano.

A native of Houston, Robinson began her studies in organ performance working toward the bachelor's degree at Bennett College before transferring and finishing her bachelors degree in voice at Texas Southern University under Ruth Stewart; further studies followed at North Texas State University and in New York with Ellen Faull, after which she debuted as Micaëla at the New York City Opera in 1972. While with the company she also sang Liù, Violetta, and the Queen of Shemakha in Le Coq d'Or. She auditioned for the San Francisco Opera, receiving first prize. For Washington Civic Opera she performed as Violetta and Juliette in 1973; for Opera/South she was Desdemona in 1973 and Adina in 1974. 1975 found her in Aix-en-Provence, where she appeared to great acclaim in a double-bill of The Impresario and La serva padrona; that same year she returned to her hometown to essay the title role in Lucrezia Borgia. For Buenos Aires, in 1980, she sang the three soprano roles in Les contes d'Hoffmann; in 1981 she returned to Mozart, performing Konstanze in Frankfurt and Elettra for the Schwetzingen Festival. In 1982 she debuted the title role in Luisa Miller at the Grand Théâtre de Bordeaux. Her debut with the Paris Opera, in which she reprised the role of Juliette, came in 1982; in 1991 she once again sang Elettra, this time for Amsterdam.

Active as well as a concert singer, Robinson has appeared with the Los Angeles Philharmonic, the New York Philharmonic, the Cleveland Orchestra, the Philadelphia Orchestra, the Houston Symphony Orchestra, the National Symphony Orchestra, the Chicago Symphony Orchestra, the Toronto Symphony Orchestra, the Royal Concertgebouw Orchestra, and the BBC Symphony Orchestra. She has also been associated with contemporary music throughout her career; in 1996 she premiered George Walker's Pulitzer Prize for Music-winning Lilacs with the Boston Symphony Orchestra, and she has specialized in the works of Michael Tippett. Her recording of Lilacs has been released by Summit Records.

Robinson's voice has been described as "flexible" and "silver-toned", and her stage presence as "charming". She has taught at the University of Arizona.
