= Sumner H. Lark =

African American lawyer and businessman

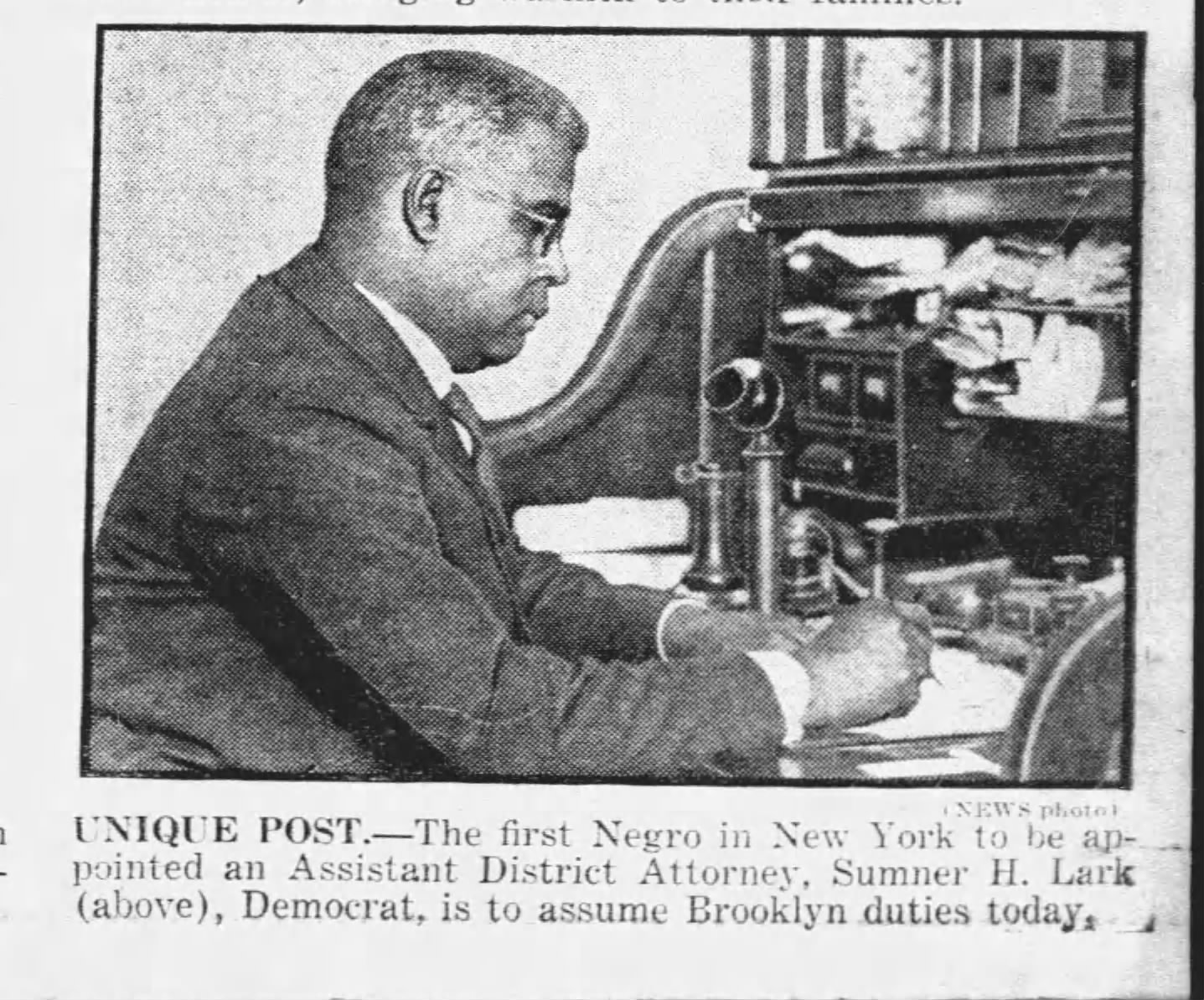
The NY Daily News incorrectly naming Sumner H. Lark as the first African American Assistant District Attorney in New York

Sumner H. Lark (1874 – June 26, 1931) was an American lawyer who was the second African American to be appointed as an Assistant District Attorney in the state of New York, although press coverage at the time of his appointment in January 1923 would incorrectly call him the first.

== Early life ==
Lark was born in 1874 in Hamburg, South Carolina, but was raised in Augusta, Georgia. His father, David Lark had been enslaved but became a successful businessman during Reconstruction. Lark had attended Augusta High School and graduated from Howard University in 1897. Before he migrated to Brooklyn, Lark had taught at the Haines Institute in Augusta and edited for The South, a daily newspaper.

== Career in Brooklyn 1900–1913 ==
In 1900, Lark migrated to Brooklyn, New York and opened a printing business. In 1908, he'd establish a newspaper, The Eye written for an African American audience and which had a strongly Democratic Party viewpoint. In 1910, Lark and six other African-American businessmen including Rufus L. Perry Jr., who was the first African American to become an Assistant District Attorney in the state of New York founded the Hannibal Democratic Club. Its mission statement was "To do any and all things necessary to be done in order to form a pleasant and harmonious union, understanding and relation with the Democratic Party of Kings County and the State and Nation... to secure justice to the members of the Ethiopian Race and insure tranquility in their homes; to provide for a common and united defense where the interest of the Ethiopian is involved; and to promote the general welfare of the members of the Club and of the Ethiopian Race in general, and to secure the blessings of liberty under that clause of the State and Federal Constitutions which protects life, liberty and property to ourselves and to our posterity." It was the first African-American Democratic club in Brooklyn.

By 1913, Lark had entered the Brooklyn Law School.

== Legal career 1913–1931 ==
In 1915, while he was enrolled at Brooklyn Law, Lark was general director in the National Negro Exposition that was held in Richmond, Virginia. He authored a 16 page booklet titled Negro lawyers of New York. He had written in a souvenir program for the Exposition "He who would have liberty, must be vigilant; he who would get his rights, must have a lawyer."

In 1916, he graduated from Brooklyn Law School and was admitted to the New York State Bar in the same year. In 1922, the incoming District Attorney for Kings County, Charles J. Dodd would accept Lark's application for a job in the DA's office. Lark would be appointed as a Deputy Assistant Distinct Attorney. On January 1, 1923, Lark was appointed, and he'd earn an annual salary of $4000. He'd serve in the Kings County District Attorney's office until March 1924.

After he resigned from the Kings County DA's office, Lark attempted to make his dream of creating an African American community in Putnam Valley a reality. The Larksburg Development Corporation was incorporated in 1925 with Lark as its legal counsel. In 1927, land was set aside for a new cemetery that would cater to African American families and the Larksburg Cemetery Corporation was formed. Lark was still working on building Larksburg when he fell ill in 1931 and died at the home of his brother on June 26.

== Personal life ==
Lark had been married to a woman named Virginia. They would have seven children, five sons and two daughters. In his will, he only left his wife $1 while his estate of over $6,000 was divided equally among his seven children.

== Legacy ==
After Lark's death, Bishop Robert C. Lawson was selected as the new president of the Larksburg Cemetery Corporation and he'd take control of much of the Larksburg property. In time, Larksburg would become known as Lawsonville, it would thrive until the 1960s (Lawson died in 1961 and the Civil Rights Act of 1964 opened up other resorts for African Americans). Today, little remains of Larksburg/Lawsonville.

In 2001, Charles J. Hynes, who was the Kings County District Attorney at the time, posthumously promoted Lark to Assistant District Attorney. Brooklyn Law School maintains a scholarship in Lark's name that is given to a minority student that shows great promise.
