= Lilacs (Walker) =

Music by George T. Walker Jr.

- by George Walker
- Commissioned by: Boston Symphony Orchestra
- Performed: 1 February 1996:
- Published: 1996: St. Louis by MMB Music

Lilacs is a musical composition by George Walker that was awarded the 1996 Pulitzer Prize for Music. The work, scored for soprano soloist and orchestra, was the unanimous choice of the Pulitzer prize jury. Walker was the first African-American composer to be awarded the prize.

Walker set sections from Walt Whitman's 1865 poem "When Lilacs Last in the Dooryard Bloom'd". Whitman wrote the poem as an elegy to President Abraham Lincoln after his death on 15 April 1865. The composition was premiered by the Boston Symphony Orchestra, conducted by Seiji Ozawa, with Faye Robinson as the soloist on February 1, 1996. "The unanimous choice of the Music Jury, this passionate, and very American, musical composition...has a beautiful and evocative lyrical quality using words of Walt Whitman."
