= Lyric for Strings =

Musical composition by George Walker

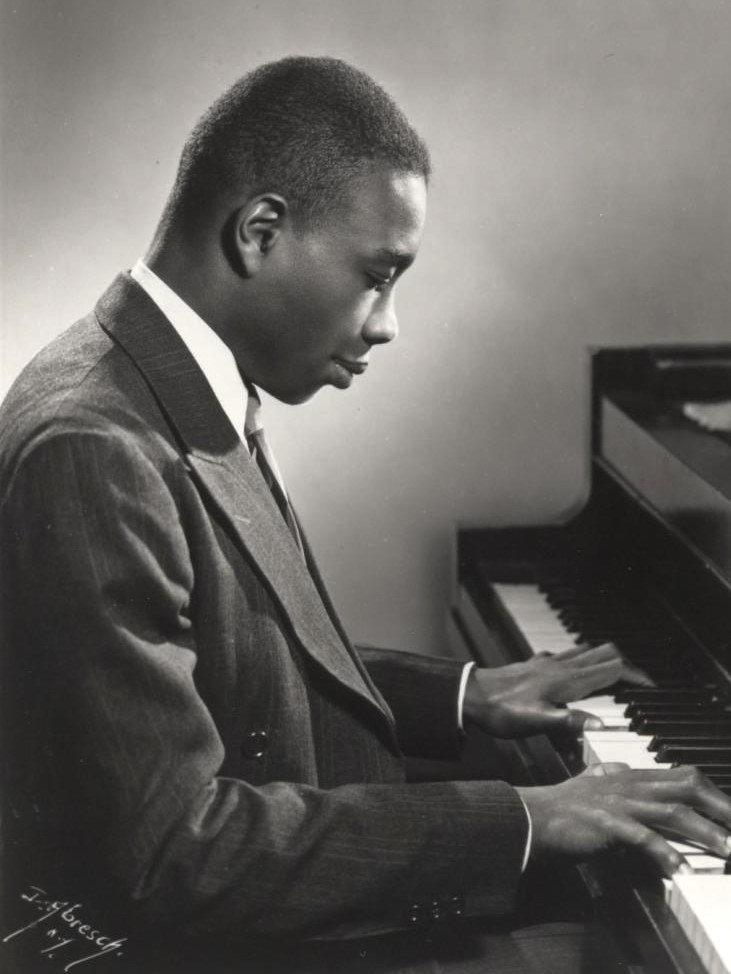
George Walker seated at the piano (c. early 1940s)

Lyric for Strings is a musical composition written by the American composer George Walker. Originally titled Lament, it was first composed as the second movement of Walker's String Quartet No. 1 in 1946 while he was a graduate student at the Curtis Institute of Music. The piece was given its world premiere later that year by the student orchestra of the Curtis Institute of Music conducted by Seymour Lipkin.

In 1990, Walker expanded the work for string orchestra, retitling it Lyric for Strings; this new arrangement subsequently became Walker's most performed composition. It is cast in a single movement and has a duration of approximately six minutes. The work is dedicated to Walker's grandmother, Melvina King, a formerly enslaved person, who died shortly before its completion.
