= Church of Our Lord Jesus Christ of the Apostolic Faith =

American Pentecostal church

Coordinates: 40°48′30″N 73°56′54″W

- Classification: Protestant
- Orientation: Oneness Pentecostal
- Founder: Robert Clarence Lawson
- Origin: 1919; New York City
- Branched from: Pentecostal Assemblies of the World
- Separations: Bible Way Church of Our Lord Jesus Christ World Wide, Inc., 1957 and Church of God in Christ Jesus International Ministries, Inc. (Apostle Wilbur L. Jones, Sr) 2000
- Congregations: 527
- Members: 85,938

The Church of Our Lord Jesus Christ of the Apostolic Faith (COOLJC) is a Oneness Pentecostal denomination with headquarters in Manhattan. It was founded in 1919 by Robert C. Lawson. According to the Association of Religion Data Archives in 2020, the denomination had 85,938 members in 527 churches.

== History ==
The "Church of Our Lord Jesus Christ", as it is most commonly known, was organized by Robert C. Lawson, a protégé of G.T. Haywood, who claimed salvation and the baptism of the Holy Ghost in 1913.

In 1914 Lawson was called to the ministry and soon began evangelizing, mainly in the Mid-West, and pastoring in Columbus, Ohio. When he found himself at odds with the leadership of the Pentecostal Assemblies of the World, Lawson resigned from that organization in 1919 and moved to New York City, where he founded the Refuge Church of Christ, after the members of a prayer band in Harlem welcomed him and turned their meetings over to him. That small church grew and became known as the Refuge Temple, and, later, the Greater Refuge Temple. It was the hub of Lawson's evangelistic efforts in the Northeast. Lawson's field work took him up and down the East Coast, throughout the West Indies, and as far as West Africa, where he appointed missionaries to carry on spiritual work.

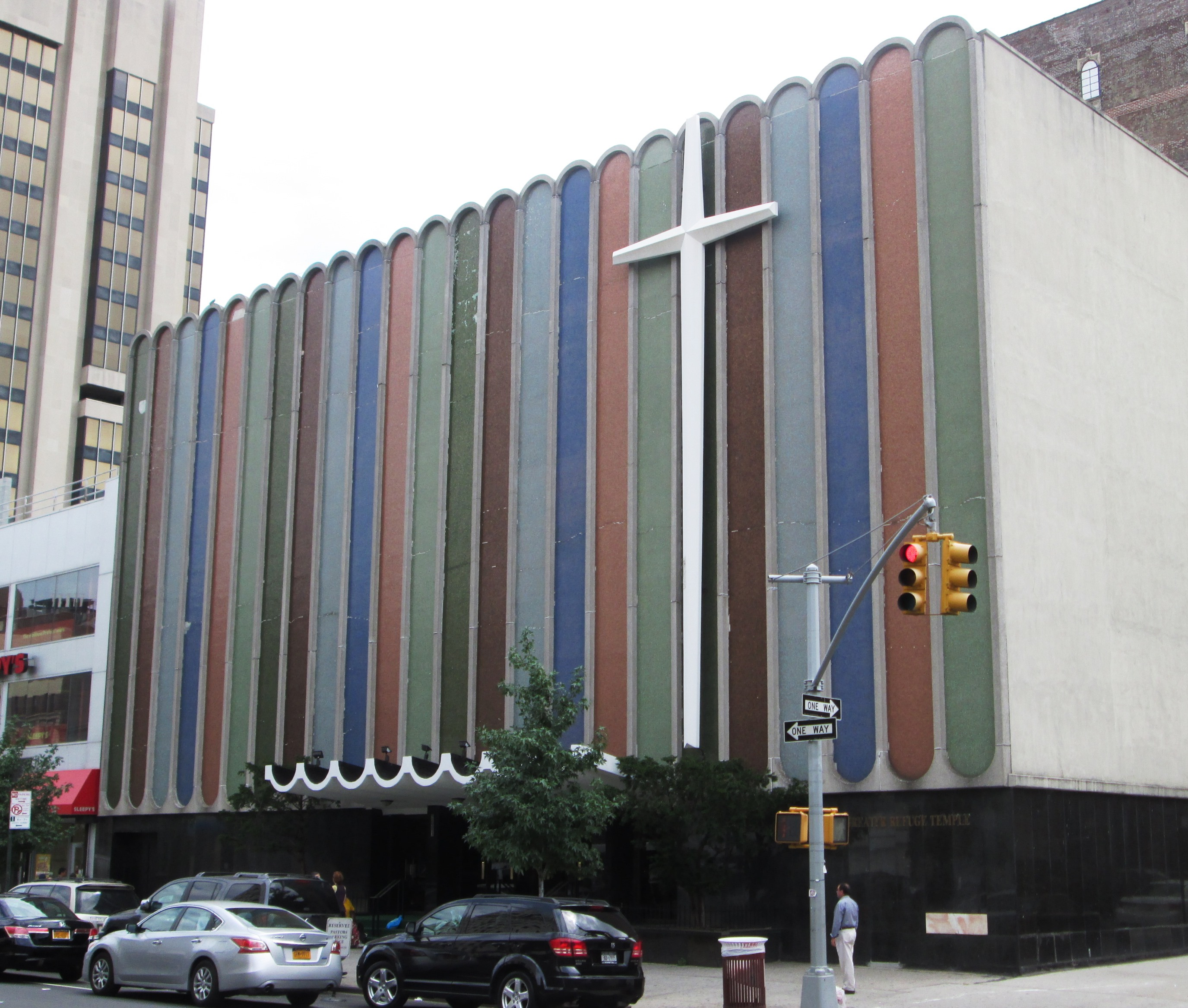
The Greater Refuge Temple in Harlem, New York City is the Church's headquarters. It was founded by Lawson in 1919 and worshipped in two other locations before moving to this building, a former casino and theater, in 1945. The facade was added in 1966.

The Church of Our Lord Jesus Christ has been very influential among African-American Pentecostal churches, and has given rise to several spin-off bodies. The first major break-away was in 1930, when Sherrod C. Johnson created a rival organization, the Church of the Lord Jesus Christ of the Apostolic Faith, through which he challenged Lawson's stance on practical holiness. The most important fracture in the church's history, though, came in 1957 when Smallwood E. Williams led about 70 churches away to form the Bible Way Church of Our Lord Jesus Christ. Other organizations that were born from or splintered from this church body include the Church of God in Christ Jesus International Ministries, Progressive Church of Our Lord Jesus Christ, the Refuge Temple Assembly of Yahweh, the Evangelistic Churches of Christ, a host of small organizations, and independent churches of varying sizes. Furthermore, there have been splits in many of the offshoot churches: for example, the church founded by Sherrod C. Johnson (Church of the Lord Jesus Christ of the Apostolic Faith, also referred to as CLJC) has splintered and re-emerged as the Holy Temple Church of the Lord Jesus Christ of the Apostolic Faith, the Apostolic Ministries of America, and the First Church of Our Lord Jesus Christ, all of which are actively evangelizing North America, the Caribbean, Europe, and West Africa. Thus, the Church of our Lord Jesus Christ is the mother of a family of predominantly African-American Pentecostal Apostolic organizations.

After Lawson's death in 1961, a rising minister in the organization, William L. Bonner, proposed a change in the church's governmental structure. Whereas Bishop Lawson, as founder, had been the sole governing prelate of the organization, Bonner suggested that there be a board of archbishops, or "apostles", who would govern the churches. Two other groups, the Board of Bishops and the Board of Presbyters, both hold accountable and are held accountable by the Board of Apostles.

The Church of Our Lord Jesus Christ has many other auxiliaries that function to serve its members and those of the community. The International Armor Bearers' Young Peoples' Union (ABYPU), the International Sunday School Department, the International Missionaries, and the International Congress are a few that work together to bring the ministry to laymen and surrounding communities.

== Doctrine and practice ==
The Church of Our Lord Jesus Christ is, historically and doctrinally, a Oneness Pentecostal organization like the United Pentecostal Church and the Pentecostal Assemblies of the World. With roots in the earliest years of American Pentecostalism, much of the culture of the church reflects the doctrine of the Holiness movement of the 1800s. Among the practices that separate it from other Pentecostal churches are its outspokenness on the significance of the name "Lord Jesus Christ", especially as a baptismal formula; a very conservative dress code, which includes the wearing of hats or some other type of headcovering (e.g., prayer veil) by women during church services; insistence on wine to be used during communion; strict interpretation of New Testament scriptures concerning divorce and remarriage; and the disallowance of women as pastors. (These last two were Lawson's points of disagreement with the Pentecostal Assemblies of the World.)

== Organization and membership ==
Governance of the church includes the Chief Apostle, the Presiding Apostle, the Board of Apostles, the Board of Bishops, the Executive Secretary, and the General Council. Apostolic Faith is based on the teaching Jesus passed down to the twelve apostles, book of Act 2. The Apostolic church is oneness, open to all people.

Major laity-driven auxiliaries are Women's Council; Ministers' and Deacons' Wives' Guild; the International Sunday School Association and the Armor Bearers' Young People's Union, which together make up the International Congress; and the International Music Department. Though women are not ordained, they are licensed as social, senior, and field Missionaries through the organization's International Missionary Department. There is also a Deacon's Union.

In 1990 the church had about 30,000 members in 450 churches in the United States. In 2018, there are now 1,200 churches worldwide, including congregations in West Africa, Mexico, Canada, the British West Indies, the Dominican Republic, England, Haiti, and the Philippines. Its U.S. membership is predominantly Black-American. Headquartered at Greater Refuge Temple Church in Harlem, New York City, the church operates W. L. Bonner College in Columbia, South Carolina and the Church of Christ Bible Institute in New York City.

=== Leaders ===
The presiders of the organization have been:

- Robert C. Lawson, 1919–1961
- Hubert J. Spencer, 1961–1973
- William L. Bonner, 1973–1995 (Presiding Apostle)
- William L. Bonner, 1990-2015 (Chief Apostle for Life)
- Gentle Groover, 1995–2001
- James I. Clark Jr., 2001–2007
- Matthew Norwood, 2007-2012
- Robert Sanders, 2013–2016
- James I. Clark, Jr., 2016-2022
- James A. Maye, 2022–2025
- Ronnie L. Parson, 2025-present
