= Thelma Waide Brown =

American concert and opera singer

Thelma Waide Brown (1897 - August 25, 1975) was an African-American concert and opera singer.

Brown was born in Ashland, Kentucky, and lived in Indianapolis before moving to Chicago. She toured as a concert singer and performed in operas, and was also a voice instructor at Chicago's Roosevelt College for over 26 years, teaching students such as Betty Jackson King and Lena Johnson McLin.

She received awards from both the National Association of Business and Professional Women's Clubs and the National Association of Negro Musicians. In 1954, she was named Woman of the Year by the Chicago chapter of the National Association of Business and Professional Women's Clubs. In 1961 she received a certificate of award from the National Association of Negro Musicians, and in 1962 a certificate from the Chicago Music Association. In 1969, in recognition of her 50-year career in singing and teaching, the Chicago Musical College held an honorary dinner for her. In 1973, she received an award for outstanding achievement from the National Association of Negro Musicians.
