= Rene Smith =

Rene Smith may refer to:

- Rene Smith, character in Heavens Above!
- Rene Smith, Miss Tennessee USA

== See also ==
- Heather Rene Smith
- Irene Smith (disambiguation)
- Renée Felice Smith (born 1985), American actress
