= Pearl Williams-Jones =

American singer

Pearl Williams-Jones (née Williams) (June 28, 1931 – February 4, 1991) was an American gospel musician.

A native of Washington, D.C., Williams was the daughter of Smallwood Edmond Williams, pastor of the Bible Way Church of Our Lord Jesus Christ. She attended public schools in the District, graduating from Charles Young Elementary, Brown Junior High School and Dunbar High School. She studied piano with Hazel Harrison and Natalie Hinderas while attending Howard University, from which she received both a bachelor's degree and a master's of music, and from which she graduated magna cum laude. She served as minister of music at her father's church and performed as a singer and pianist throughout the United States and Europe, appearing in such venues as Carnegie Hall, Lincoln Center, the Kennedy Center, Wigmore Hall in London and the Suphiensalle in Munich. A well-regarded scholar of gospel music, she spent decades as a professor of music at the University of the District of Columbia, where she developed the first degree program in the United States dedicated to the study and performance of gospel. She taught jazz history and music appreciation as well, and directed the university's gospel choir. She served as a technical advisory on the film Say Amen, Somebody. For two decades she consulted with the Smithsonian Folklife Festival, and worked as an administrative staff member of its African Diaspora Advisory Group. Williams-Jones published a number of works, including a study of the work of Roberta Martin written with Bernice Johnson Reagon. As a composer she was especially known for her performance of "Jesus, Lover of My Soul" to the accompaniment of Johann Sebastian Bach's "Jesu, Joy of Man's Desiring".

Williams-Jones received an honorary degree from Lynchburg College in 1972. She died in 1991 after an 18-month battle with cancer. She was married to Williams V. Jones, MD, with whom she had two children, Yvonne and Virgil Jr.
