= Rebecca Walker Steele =

American musician and educator (1925–2019)

Rebecca Walker Steele

Rebecca Walker Steele (October 18, 1925 - January 12, 2019) was an American musician and educator. She was known for her singing and for her choral direction. Steele directed choirs at Florida A&M University and Bethune-Cookman College.

== Biography ==
Steele was born on October 18, 1925, in Lakeland, Florida. She showed early musical talent, performing in her grandfather's church at age 4. Her parents encouraged her in pursuing music and made she had the "best possible training." She attended the Rochelle High School and earned an associate degree from Florida Memorial College. Steele graduated with a bachelor's degree from Alabama State University (ASU), where she studied piano under Hazel Harrison. She earned master's degrees in voice, piano, choral conducting and also in music education from Columbia University. Steele earned her Ph.D. in 1973 from Florida State University, where she specialized in multicultural music education.

While she was in New York City, she "was in great demand as a singer." Steele worked as the university choir director at Florida A&M University (FAMU) where she was in charge of one of Tallahassee's first "multiracial choirs." Steel worked at FAMU between 1947 until 1976, when she went on to become a faculty member (and Dean of Humanities) at Bethune-Cookman College. Steele retired from Bethune-Cookman in 2013. As a choir director, her choral groups performed across the United States and were "constantly in demand."

Steele died on January 12, 2019.
