= Church of Senhor do Socorro =

- Shrine of Our Lord of Help
- Igreja do Senhor do Socorro
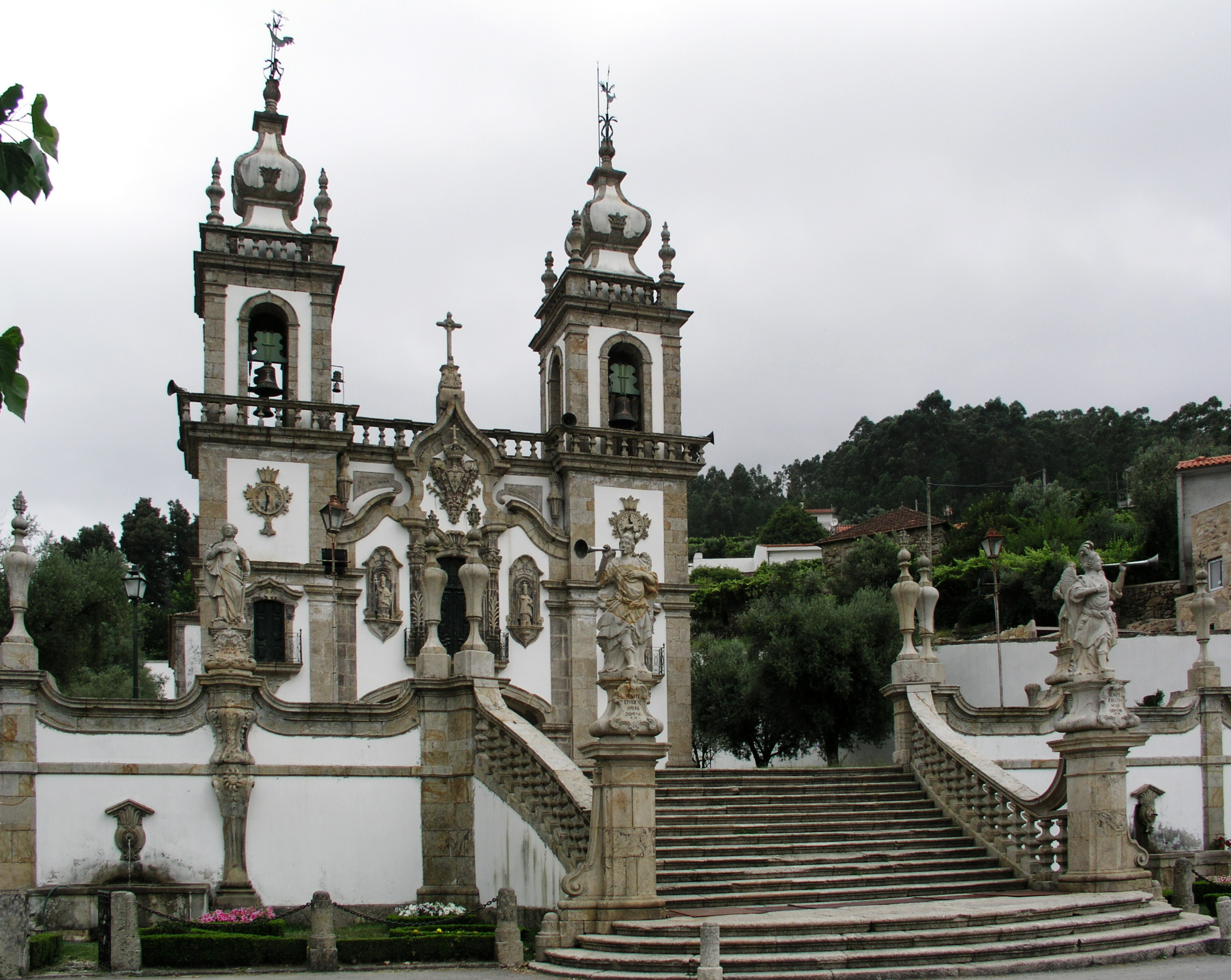
- A view of the Sanctuary of Senhor do Socorro
- Church of Senhor do Socorro
- 41°50′30.27″N 8°35′36.49″W
- Location: Viana do Castelo, Alto Minho, Norte
- Country: Portugal
- Denomination: Roman Catholic

Architecture
- Years built: 18th Century

Specifications
- Length: 18 m (59 ft)
- Width: 31 m (102 ft)

Administration
- Diocese: Diocese of Viana do Castelo

The Church of Senhor do Socorro (Portuguese: Igreja do Senhor do Socorro) is an 18th-century Baroque sanctuary situated in the civil parish of Labruja, municipality of Ponte de Lima, in the Portuguese district of Viana do Castelo. The church is the centre of pilgrimages and festivals in honour of the Lord of Help/Distress, particularly on the first Saturday and Sunday of July, attracting many people from the Portuguese diaspora. It was classified as Property of Public Interest in 1977.

== History ==
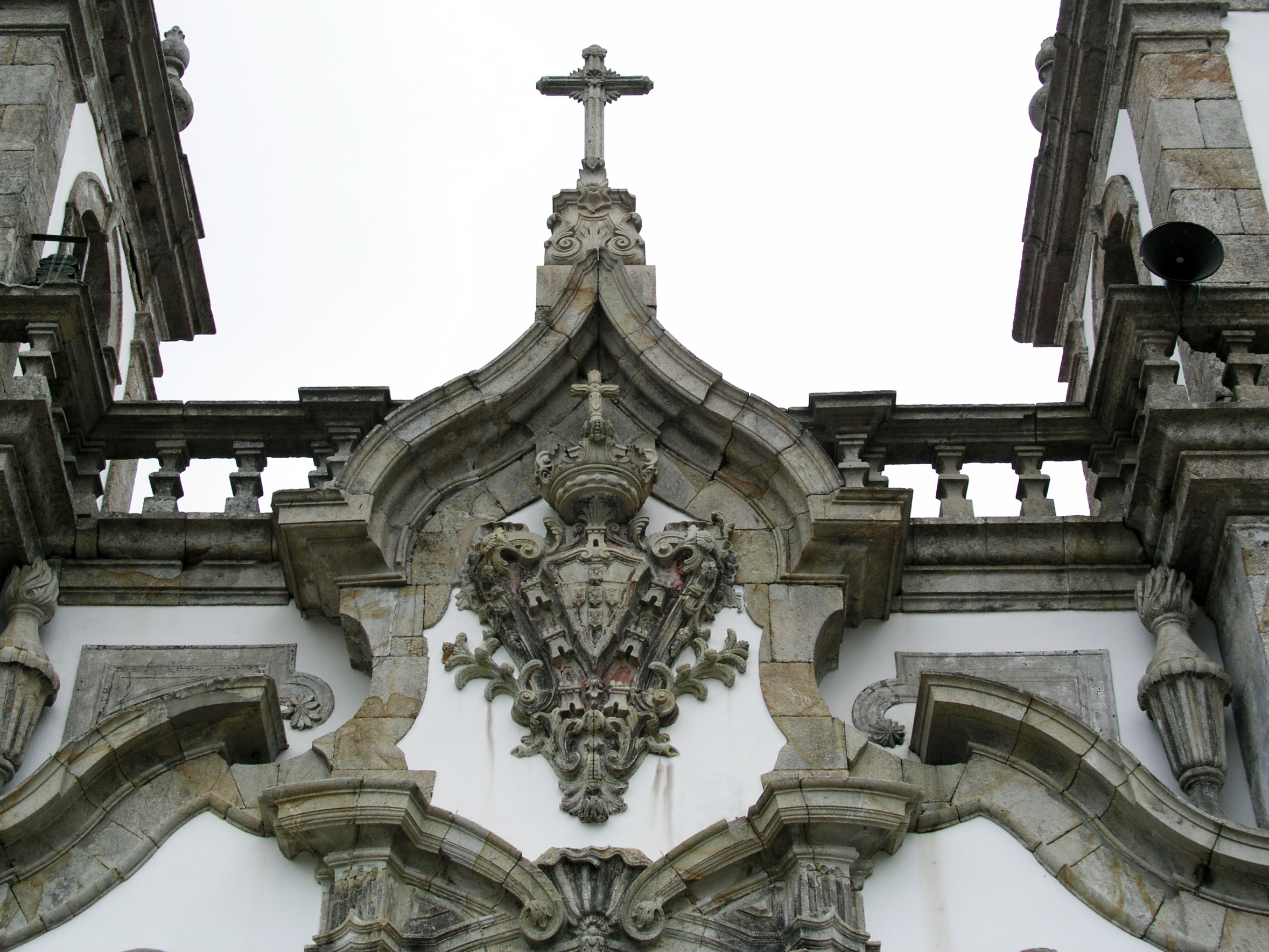
The view of the facade of the Church of Senhor do Socorro, showing the royal coat-of-arms, marking the influence or patronage of the Portuguese Corte

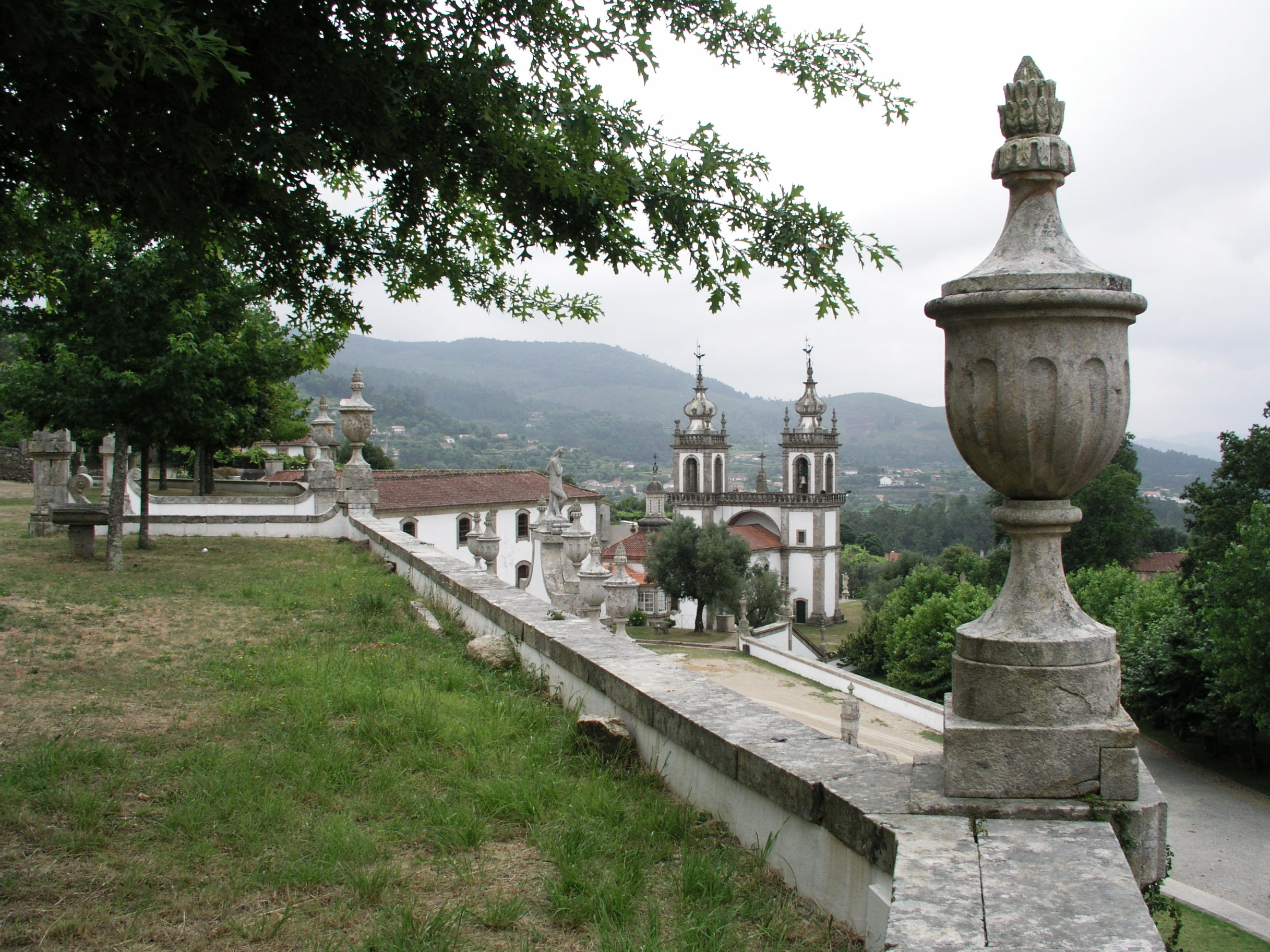
A view of the Church on the grounds, with terraced gardens

The construction of the church began in 1773, possibly with royal grants given the presence of the coat-of-arms located on the frontispiece. A votive offering was already occurring at the site by 1774. Work on the sanctuary continued the rest of this centre, with decoration and public artwork installed in the retable and chancel. The cost of the work on the collateral retables were readjusted by painters Manuel José Afonso (from the parish of Sapo) and Manuel Martins da Cunha (resident of Covas) to the tune of 78$200 reis on 15 December 1777.

Sometime in the 19th century the sanctuary was renovated by António Augusto Pereira.

On separate occasions the church became a centre of votive offerings, similar to 1774. These were made either to fulfill a vow made to God for deliverance, or offering to the church in gratitude for a favor that was granted. In 1829, the votives were offered to delivering the faithful, while in 1877, a votive was issued for miraculous cures.

Given the date associated with the sanctuary (1864), 100 years after the construction of the church, it is unclear whether this was part of the original design, or if it developed later. If it was secondary plan, it can be concluded that this design was influenced by the construction of the Sanctuary of Bom Jesus (in Braga), which was constructed between 1784 and 1811. Carlos Alberto Ferreira de Almeida, has noted that interior tile is one of the more notable group of tilework this lateral period of construction.

Between 1981 and 1982, a plaque was installed to mark and the public works to the chapel of the "Via Sacra" (Holy Way), by Manuel Esteves.

== Architecture ==
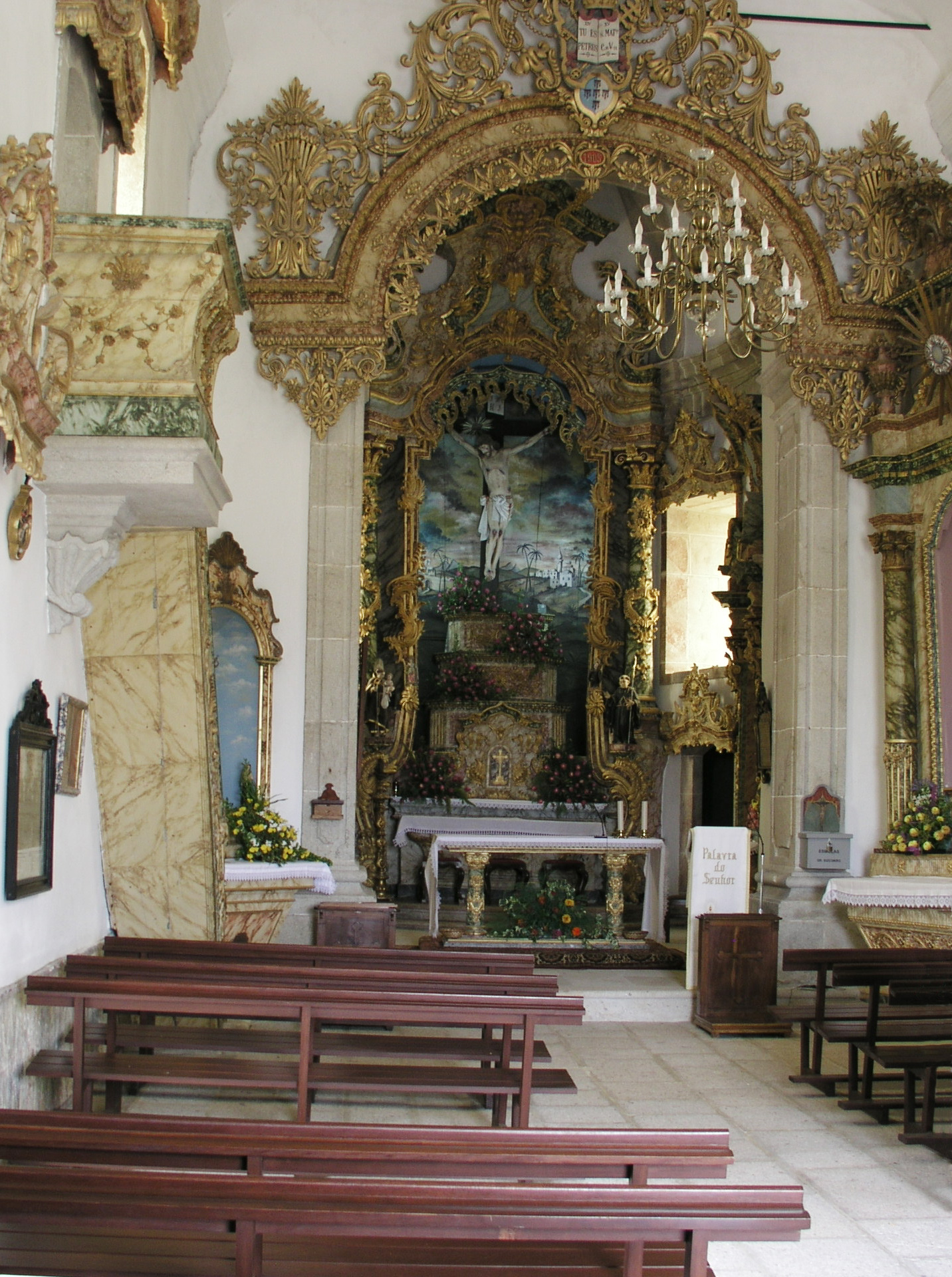
The interior chancel and nave, with ornate gilded woodwork, with altar showing Jerusalem

The sanctuary is situated on a mountain, alongside buildings that were used initially in the construction of the sanctuary (but today abandoned), used in the preparation of foods (goat and chicken) during the pilgrimages.

The sanctuary includes a church and staircase, with the church implanted longitudinally, comprising one nave, square chancel, undulating exterior elevations and lateral sacristy: all sections are differentiated and covered in roof tile.

The frontispiece is flanked by two bell-towers, will corner pilasters and sectioned into three registers. The first register includes bay window and pediment; the second a clock; and the third register occupied by the bells. These towers are crowned by bulbous vaulted-ceiling. The church porch is open to a segmented arch topped by large window bay, with monumental shoulders bound by pediment and interrupted by a royal coat-of-arms. On either side of the large window are two niches with sculptors.

The church platform is surrounded by a wall, paced by pilasters and decorated statues, with two ponds and shelters flanking the central staircase. Behind the church, is a wavy monumental staircase, the front framed by pilasters and crowned by urns, with central fountain and statue. This area provides access to a projected series of chapels, although only one was constructed (a square plan) with corner pilasters, ranging from full arch, side windows, dome and small altar inside.

=== Interior ===
The hexagonal nave is decorated with granite wainscot and includes a triumphal arch in tile, with the barrel vault adorned by three painted medallions. On one end is the high choir, while in the opposite direction are two lateral and two collateral altars, with a pulpit with granite base, and staircase.

The interior chancel is circular with domed skylight, two carved altars, two doors and windows with carved altarpiece with painting of Jerusalem.

== See also ==
- List of churches in Portugal
