= Robert C. Lawson =

Bishop Robert Clarence Lawson
- Founding Bishop of COOLJC
- Church: Founded the Refuge Church of Christ which became the Church of Our Lord Jesus Christ of the Apostolic Faith

Orders
- Ordination: Pentecostal Assemblies of the World

Personal details
- Born: May 5, 1883 New Iberia, Louisiana, USA
- Died: July 2, 1961 (aged 78) New York City
- Education: Howe Institute in Louisiana

Bishop Robert Clarence Lawson was an early-20th-century American Oneness Pentecostal clergyman, best known for founding the Refuge Church of Christ, a predecessor of the Church of Our Lord Jesus Christ.

== Early life ==
Bishop Robert Clarence Lawson was born on May 5, 1883, in New Iberia, Louisiana. His parents died when he was very young and he was raised by an aunt, Peggy Fraser, during his early childhood.

Lawson had no plans to enter the ministry, he did have plans to become a lawyer and businessman. After attending Howe Institute (New Iberia) in Louisiana, Lawson traveled throughout the United States, becoming a cabaret singer and gambling and hustling when he had the chance.

In 1913, Lawson was stricken ill while in the Midwest and was diagnosed with tuberculosis. At that time, this diagnosis was tantamount to a death sentence, and doctors felt that nothing could be done to save his life.

While in the hospital, Lawson was ministered to by an elderly woman whose son was hospitalized in the same room. A "Holy Ghost Woman", as he described her, who urged him to start praying. She belonged to the Apostolic faith Assembly pastored by Elder G. T. Haywood.

In later life, Lawson enjoyed telling the story of his call of God to the ministry: “As I was kneeling beside the bed saying my prayers, suddenly there entered the room the presence of God in a whirlwind. This presence enveloped me while I lay upon my bed, and the voice of God Spoke out of a whirlwind in words I distinctly heard, saying, ‘Go preach my word, I mean you…I mean you…I mean YOU. Go preach my word’.”

A short time later, the frail young man was healed and followed his divine orders by heading the Apostolic Faith Assembly in Indianapolis and becoming baptized.

When Lawson first became "saved", he belonged to a Pentecostal church.

== Ministry ==
That year Lawson founded the Refuge Church of Christ in 1919, after the members of a prayer band in Harlem welcomed him and turned their meetings over to him. That small church grew and became known as Refuge Temple, and, later, the Greater Refuge Temple. At its height, the enterprise on 133rd Street contained a grocery store, a bookstore, record and radio shop, and daycare. In the basement of the church was a complete printing office where many tracts, booklets, and songs were published.

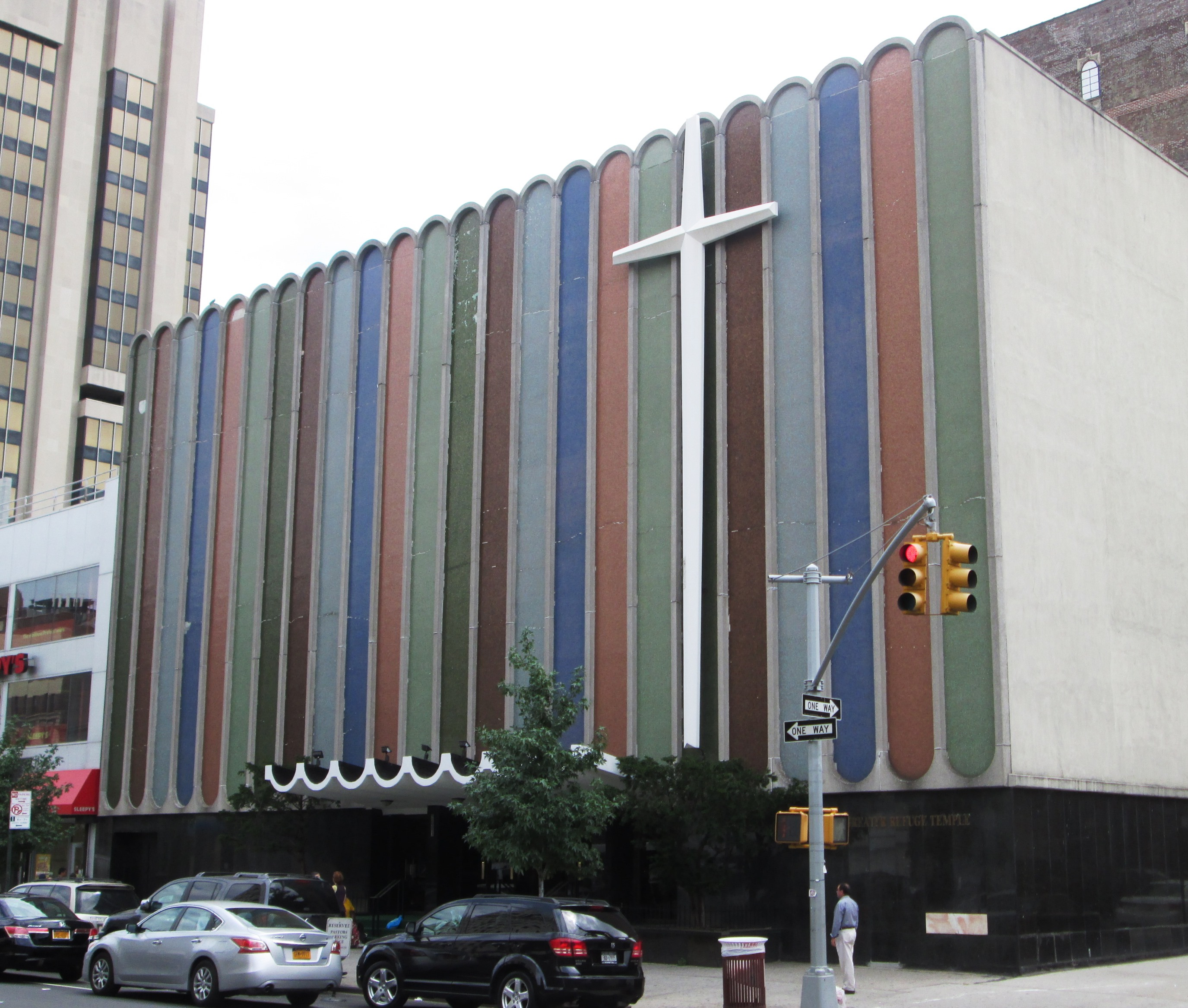
The Greater Refuge Temple in Harlem, New York City, has been located since 1945 in a former casino and vaudeville/movie theatre. The building was renovated and had its colorful facade added in 1966.

The Refuge Temple in Harlem was the hub of Lawson's evangelistic efforts in the Northeast, which ultimately grew into the Church of Our Lord Jesus Christ, or COOLJC. Lawson's field work took him up and down the East Coast, throughout the West Indies, and as far as West Africa, where Lawson appointed missionaries to carry on the church's spiritual work.

Lawson was a leading figure in an influential Pentecostal organization at a time when Pentecostal churches were rare. Lawson founded a chain of funeral homes, a seminary, a radio station, a magazine, and several businesses, among other endeavors.

By the time Lawson died on June 30, 1961, the membership at his headquarters Greater Refuge Temple had grown to over 3,000 members. Lawson's Harlem church is still thriving more than 45 years after his death.

In 1998, COOLJC had about 30,000 members in 450 churches in the United States. There are now 582 churches worldwide, including congregations in West Africa, Mexico, Canada, the British West Indies, the Dominican Republic, England, Haiti, and the Philippines. Its U.S. membership remains predominantly African-American.

In 1927, Bishop Lawson founded the Barger Street Colony, variously known as the Emmanual Inn, Lawsonville, or Larksburg, on 121 acres (0.49 km^{2}) in Putnam Valley, New York. The property contained a 20-room summer inn, a cattle barn, a grocery store, and a gas station.

By the early 1930s, busloads of people, mostly from Lawson's Harlem church, perhaps several hundred for a summer weekend, would make the trip from the city to Putnam Valley.

When the 1964 Civil Rights Act opened up other resorts to African-Americans, the boomtown period for African American resorts subsided. These communities continue to be important as heritage landmarks.

Today, little remains of the once-thriving resort of Lawsonville. Most of the bungalows were sold and converted to single-family homes, and the acreage sold off little by little. Records indicate that the old hotel was demolished around 1970. The gas station building is being used for storage by its present owner.

The 20-acre (8.1 ha) cemetery remains, although it is in poor condition. Records show that about 30 people are interred there, the most notable being Bishop Lawson himself. However, most of the grave markers have been overturned and/or are illegible.
