= Hazel Harrison =

American concert pianist (1883–1969)

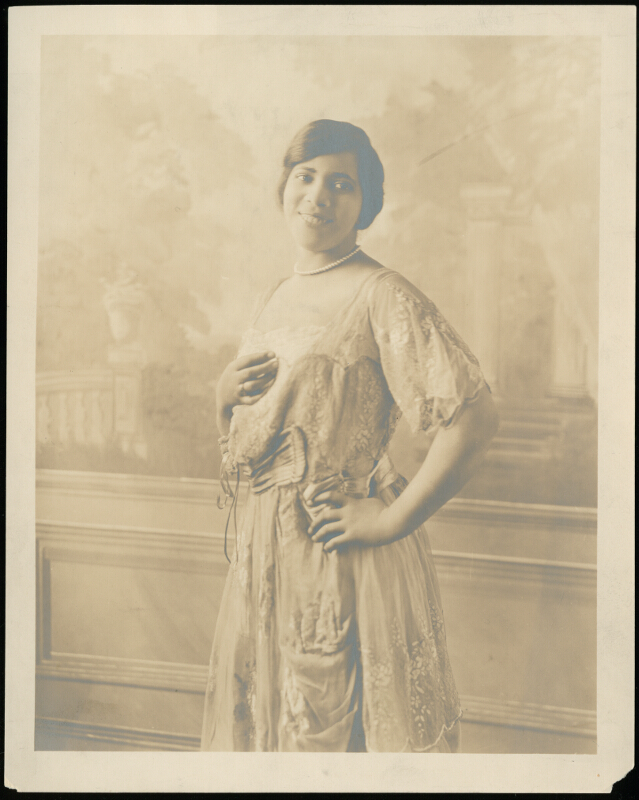
Portrait of Hazel Harrison

Hazel Harrison (May 12, 1883 – April 29, 1969) was an American concert pianist. She was the first fully American-trained musician to appear with a European orchestra.

Harrison was born in La Porte, Indiana, and spent most of her childhood home schooled; but she attended La Porte High School, and graduated. She began private piano training as a child of four or five years old with Richard Warren Pellow, an English organist at the First Presbyterian Church who taught music in the local public schools. In high school she began studies under German musician Victor Heinze, eventually commuting between La Porte and Chicago to continue lessons with him. She spent most of her time in Berlin performing recitals and performing with the Berlin Philharmonic. She became the first Black woman, and most likely the first Black musician, to perform as a solo instrumentalist with the Berlin Philharmonic when she made her debut with them in 1904, playing Chopin's Piano Concerto in E Minor and Edvard Grieg's Piano Concerto in A Minor.

Harrison later returned to the United States, and while performing in Chicago received sponsorship to travel back to Europe. During the next several years, she continued her studies with Hugo van Dalen in Berlin. Van Dalan arranged for Harrison to have an audition with Italian composer and pianist Ferruccio Busoni; after hearing her, Busoni, who had previously refused to accept more students, decided to oversee her training. She then began performing as a concert pianist both in Europe and the U.S., eluding much recognition in the U.S. in spite of the fact that she was lauded in the Black press.

In 1931, Harrison accepted a job as the head of the piano department at the Tuskegee Institute in Alabama. Ralph Ellison took a comment by Harrison as the starting point for one of his essays, The Little Man at Chehaw Station. (Chehaw was the station on the Western Railway of Alabama, that served the Tuskegee area.)

In 1936 she moved to Washington, D.C., and accepted a teaching job at Howard University, where she remained until retirement in 1955. Among her diverse pupils were Ralph Ellison, Roberta Flack, Charlotte Wesley Holloman, Pearl Williams-Jones, Josephine Harreld Love and Rebecca Walker Steele. While teaching, Harrison still performed in the United States, and after retirement she accepted positions at Alabama A&M University and Jackson College.
