= Irene Britton Smith =

American classical composer

Irene Britton Smith (December 22, 1907 – February 15, 1999) was an American classical composer and educator.

== Biography ==
=== Childhood and youth ===
Irene Britton Smith was born on December 22, 1907, in Chicago, Illinois as the youngest of four siblings. She was of African-American, Crow, and Cherokee descent. Smith attended Ferron Grammar School, Doolittle Grammar School, and Wendell Phillips High School.

=== Adult life ===
Smith wanted to study music at Northwestern University but her family could not afford to send her there. Instead, she attended Chicago Normal School from 1924–1926 to train as a teacher. In 1930 she began teaching primary grades in Chicago public schools. She married Herbert E. Smith (d. December 28, 1975) on August 8, 1931. Smith was an advocate of the phono-visual method of teaching reading and Chicago University Press published her monograph on the topic, Methods and Materials for Teaching Word Perception in Kindergarten Through Grade Three, in 1960. She retired from teaching in June 1978 and became a docent for the Chicago Symphony Orchestra at elementary schools. In 1994 Smith moved to Montgomery Place Retirement Home in Chicago. She died in Chicago on February 15, 1999.

=== Musical activity ===
As a child Smith studied piano with V. Emanuel Johnson and took violin lessons. She was active as a violinist in the all-black Harrison Farrell Orchestra from 1930 to 1931. From 1932 to 1943 she was a part-time student at the American Conservatory of Music, where she studied music theory with Stella Roberts and composition with Leo Sowerby. She received a Bachelor of Music degree from the American Conservatory of Music in 1943.

From 1946 to 1947 Smith took a sabbatical from teaching to complete graduate work at the Juilliard School of Music, where she studied composition with Vittorio Giannini. In the summer of 1948, Smith studied composition at the Eastman School of Music with Wayne Barlow. The following summer she studied composition with Irving Fine while attending the Tanglewood Music Festival. In 1956 Smith completed her Master of Music degree at DePaul University, where she studied composition with Leon Stein. In the summer of 1958, she studied composition with Nadia Boulanger at the Fontainebleau Summer School in France. Smith ceased composing in 1962, but her works continued to be performed during her lifetime.

== Works ==
This is a list of works by Smith.

Violin

- Reminiscence for violin, piano, 1941
- Sonata for Violin and Piano, 1947 (published by Vivace Press in 1996)

Piano

- Invention in Two Voices, 1940
- Passacaglia and Fugue in C-sharp Minor, 1940 (published by Vivace Press in 2001)
- Nocturne, 1945
- Variations on a Theme by MacDowell, 1947 (published by Vivace Press in 2001)
- Two Short Preludes for Piano, 1953 (published by Vivace Press in 2001)
- Fugue in A Flat Major, n.d.
- Prelude, n.d.
- Preludes I and II (arrangement of Béla Bartók), n.d.

Instrumental ensemble

- Fugue in G minor, for violin, viola, cello, 1938

Orchestra

- Sinfonietta, 1956
- Autumnal Reverie, n.d.
- Sonata No. III (arrangement of Edvard Grieg), n.d.
- Three Fantastic Dances (arrangement of Dmitri Shostakovich), n.d.
- Untitled-Variations on a Theme, n.d.

Solo voice

- Dream Cycle for soprano, piano (song cycle, text by Paul Laurence Dunbar) 1947
- "Let Us Break Bread Together" for baritone/soprano/mezzo (spiritual), 1948
- "Trees of the Night" for soprano, piano, 1954
- "The Angel Roll the Stone Away" for voice, piano (spiritual, incomplete), n.d.
- "Psalm 121" for voice, piano (incomplete), n.d.

Vocal ensemble

- "Born Free" for two voices (spiritual), n.d.
- "Let Us Break Bread Together" for mezzo, soprano, baritone (spiritual), n.d.
- "Not a Word" for solo voice and four male voices (spiritual), n.d.
- "Panis Angelicus" for three voices, n.d.
- "Psalm 25" for three female voices, n.d.
- "Swing Low" and "Were You There" for three female voices (combined spirituals), n.d.

Chorus

- "God Is Our Refuge/Psalm 46" for SATB, solo baritone, piano, 1940
- "Fairest Lord Jesus" for SA, organ, 1945 (hymn, published by G. Schirmer in 1946)
- "Born Anew" for SATB, solo baritone, organ, 1952
- "Good Morning" for unison voices, piano, n.d.
- "It's Me, O Lord" for SSA (spiritual), n.d.
- "Psalm 130" for SATB, organ, n.d.
- "The Story of Crosspatch" for SATB, n.d.

== Discography ==
- Sonata for Violin and Piano on Kaleidoscope: Music by African-American Women. Gregory Walker, Helen Walker-Hill. Leonarda Productions CD, LE 339, 1995.

== Bibliography ==
- Methods and Materials for Teaching Word Perception in Kindergarten through Grade Three. Chicago: University of Chicago Press, 1960. Reprinted in Albert J. Mazurkiewicz, New Perspectives in Reading Instruction (1964).

== Sources ==
- Helen, Walker-Hill, (2002). From Spirituals to Symphonies: African-American Women Composers and Their Music. Westport, Conn.: Greenwood Press. ISBN 0313299471. OCLC 47690158.
