= George Walker (composer) =

American classical composer (1922–2018)

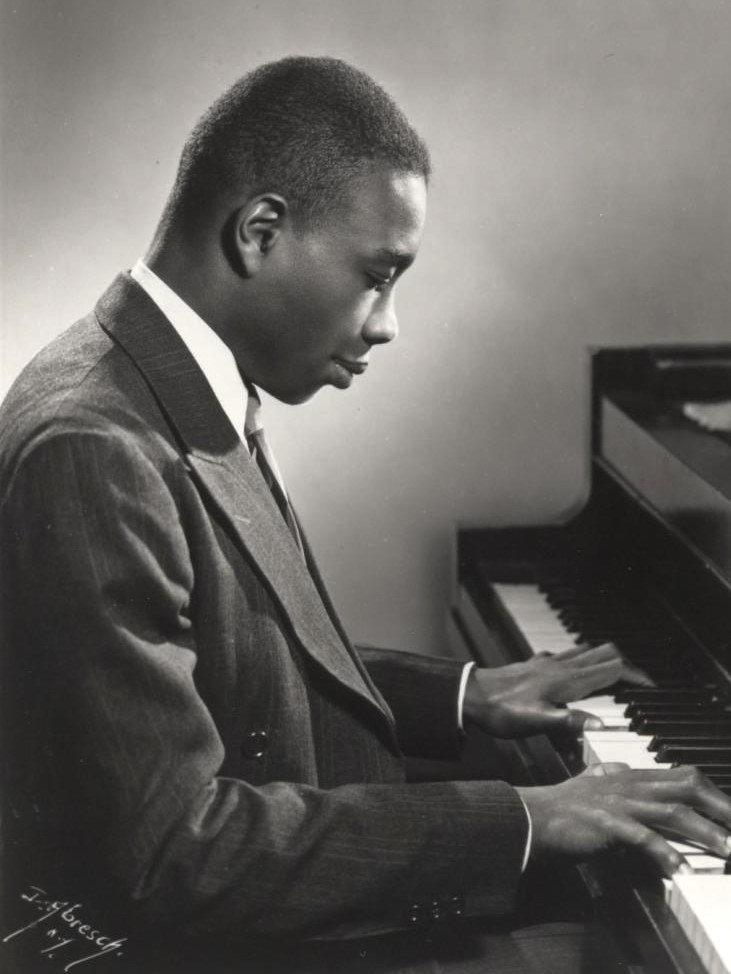
- Walker seated at the piano (c. early 1940s)
- Born: June 27, 1922; Washington, D.C., U.S.
- Died: August 23, 2018 (aged 96); Montclair, New Jersey, U.S.
- Occupations: Composer; singer; pianist; arranger
- Spouse: Helen Walker-Hill (m. 1960; div. 1975)
- Children: 2 (Gregory and Ian)

George Theophilus Walker (June 27, 1922 – August 23, 2018) was an American composer, pianist, and organist, and the first African American to win the Pulitzer Prize for Music, which he received for his work Lilacs in 1996.

== Biography ==
George Theophilus Walker was born on June 27, 1922, in Washington, D.C., the son of Artmelle George Theophilus Walker, a physician, and Rosa King Walker, who oversaw his first piano lessons when he was five years old. A graduate of Dunbar High School (Washington, D.C.), he was admitted to the Oberlin Conservatory at fourteen, and later to the Curtis Institute of Music to study piano with Rudolf Serkin, chamber music with William Primrose and Gregor Piatigorsky, and composition with Rosario Scalero, teacher of Samuel Barber. He received his doctorate from the Eastman School of Music at the University of Rochester. Walker taught at Rutgers University in New Jersey for several years, retiring in 1992.

Walker's first major orchestral work was the Address for Orchestra. His Lyric for Strings is his most performed orchestral work. He composed many works including five sonatas for piano, a mass, cantata, many songs, choral works, organ pieces, sonatas for cello and piano, violin and piano and viola and piano, a brass quintet and a woodwind quintet. He published over 90 works and received commissions from the New York Philharmonic, Boston Symphony, Cleveland Orchestra, Philadelphia Orchestra, and many other ensembles. He was the recipient of six honorary doctoral degrees.

Walker died on August 23, 2018, in Montclair, New Jersey, at the age of 96.

== Personal life ==
Walker was married to pianist and scholar Helen Walker-Hill between 1960 and 1975. Walker was the father of two sons, violinist and composer Gregory T.S. Walker and playwright Ian Walker.

== Awards and recognition ==
In 1996, Walker became the first black composer to receive the Pulitzer Prize in Music for his work, Lilacs for voice and orchestra, premiered by the Boston Symphony, Seiji Ozawa conducting. Washington, D.C. Mayor Marion Barry proclaimed June 17, 1997, as "George Walker Day" in the nation's capital.

In 1997, Walker was awarded the Order of the Long Leaf Pine by North Carolina Governor Jim Hunt.

In 1998, he received the Composers Award from the Lancaster Symphony and the letter of Distinction from the American Music Center for "his significant contributions to the field of contemporary American Music". He was elected to the American Academy of Arts and Letters in 1999. The following year, George Walker was inducted into the American Classical Music Hall of Fame.

Over the next several years, he received the Dorothy Maynor Outstanding Arts Citizen Award (2000), Classical Roots Award from the Detroit Symphony (2001), the A.I. Dupont Award from the Delaware Symphony (2002) the Washington Music Hall of Fame (2002), and the Aaron Copland ASCAP Award (2012). He was the recipient of two Guggenheim Fellowships, two Rockefeller Fellowships, a Fromm Foundation commission, two Koussevitsky Awards, and an American Academy of Arts and Letters Award, as well as honorary doctorate degrees from Lafayette College (1982), Oberlin College (1983), Bloomfield College (1996), Montclair State University (1997), Curtis Institute of Music (1997), Spelman College (2001), and the Eastman School of Music where he gave the Commencement Address (2012).

His autobiography, Reminiscences of an American Composer and Pianist, was released in 2009 by Scarecrow Press.

== Music ==
Unwilling to conform to a specific style, Walker drew from his diverse knowledge of previous music to create something which he could call his own. While a work such as Spatials for Piano uses twelve-tone serial techniques, Walker could also compose in the style of popular music such as in his song “Leaving.” According to Mickey Terry, traces of old black spirituals can also be found in his Violin Sonata No. 2. D. Maxine Sims has stated that Walker's piano technique is also reflected in his works, such as his Piano Sonata No. 2. This sonata contains changing meters, syncopation, and bitonal writing which all present great challenges for a performer to overcome. BBC Radio 3 devoted five hours to Walker's music as "Composer of the Week" in October, 2021.

== Major compositions ==
Walker's oeuvre includes the following works:

- A Red, Red Rose for Voice and Piano
- Abu for Narrator and Chamber Ensembles (Network for New Music commission)
- Address for Orchestra
- An Eastman Overture (Eastman School of Music commission)
- Antifonys for Chamber Orchestra
- Bleu for Unaccompanied Violin
- Cantata for Soprano, Tenor, Boys Choir, and Chamber Orchestra (Boys Choir of Harlem commission)
- Canvas for Wind Ensemble and Narrator (College Band Directors National Association commission)
- Cello Concerto (New York Philharmonic commission)
- Concerto for Piano and Orchestra (National Endowment for the Arts Commission)
- Concerto for Trombone and Orchestra (1957)
- Concerto for Violin and Orchestra
- Da Camera (Musica Reginae commission)
- Dialogus for Cello and Orchestra (Cleveland Orchestra commission)
- Emily Dickinson Songs
- Five Fancies for Clarinet and Piano Four Hands (David Ensemble commission)
- Foils for Orchestra (Hommage a Saint George) (Eastman School of Music commission)
- Folk Songs for Orchestra
- Guido's Hand (Xerox commission)
- Hommage to Saint George (Eastman School of Music commission)
- Hoopla: A Touch of Glee
- Icarus In Orbit
- In Praise of Folly
- Lilacs for Voice and Orchestra
- Lyric for Strings
- Mass for Soloists, Chorus, and Orchestra (National Endowment for the Arts commission)
- Modus (Cygnus Ensemble commission)
- Movements for Cello and Orchestra
- Music for 3
- Music for Brass (Sacred and Profane)
- Music for Two Pianos
- Nine Songs for Voice and Piano
- Orpheus for Narrator and Chamber Orchestra
- Overture: In Praise of Folly
- Pageant and Proclamation (New Jersey Symphony commission)
- Perimeters for Clarinet and Piano
- Piano Sonata No. 1
- Piano Sonata No. 2
- Piano Sonata No. 3
- Piano Sonata No. 4
- Piano Sonata No. 5
- Poem for Soprano and Chamber Ensemble (National Endowment for the Arts commission)
- Poeme for Violin and Orchestra (Saint Paul Chamber Orchestra premiere)
- Psalms for Chorus
- Serenata for Chamber Orchestra (Michigan Chamber Orchestra commission)
- Sinfonia No. 1 (Fromm Foundation commission)
- Sinfonia No. 2 (Koussevitsky commission)
- Sinfonia No. 3
- Sinfonia No. 4
- Sinfonia No. 5 "Visions" (two versions, one with voices and one without)
- Sonata for Cello and Piano
- Sonata for Two Pianos
- Sonata for Viola and Piano
- Sonata for Violin and Piano No. 1
- Spatials for Piano
- Spektra for Piano
- Spires for Organ
- String Quartet No. 1
- String Quartet No. 2
- Tangents for Chamber Orchestra (Columbus Pro Musica Chamber Orchestra commission)
- Three Pieces for Organ
- Two Pieces for Organ
- Variations for Orchestra
- Violin and Piano Sonata No. 2
- Windset for Woodwind Quintet
