= Gregory T.S. Walker =

George Walker's son

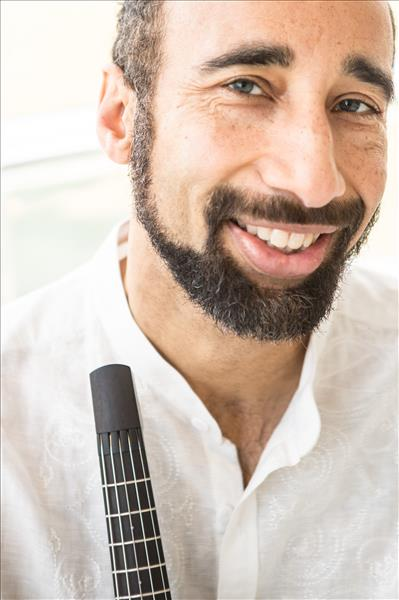
Gregory T.S. Walker

Gregory T.S. Walker (born October 19, 1961) is an American composer, violinist, and guitarist. He was the recipient of the American Academy of Arts and Letters Charles Ives Fellowship in 2000, and has performed with major orchestras around the world.

== Biography ==
Walker is the son of music historian Helen Walker-Hill and Pulitzer Prize-winning composer George Walker. He studied with violinist Yuval Yaron and received a master's degree in computer music from the University of California at San Diego, and a doctorate in musical composition from the University of Colorado. Walker currently serves as a professor at the University of Colorado Denver. An accomplished composer and violinist, he performed his Concerto No. 1 for Orchestra and Synthesizer with the Oakland Sinfonietta and earned a second master's in composition from Mills College in 1987. In 1993, the Colorado Symphony commissioned Walker to compose what has been acknowledged as the first "rap symphony", Dream N. the Hood.

Walker has been featured in soloist engagements with the Philadelphia Orchestra, Oberlin Orchestra, the Encuentro Musical de los Americas in Havana, Cuba, the Detroit Symphony, the Colorado Symphony, Poland's Filharmonia Sudecka, and the Colorado Music Festival Orchestra, as well as at the Library of Congress, England's Lake District Music Festival, Centro Mexicano para la Musica y las Artes Sonoras, Peking University, and the Cork Orchestral Society Concert Series in Ireland. For 25 years, Walker served as concertmaster for the Boulder Philharmonic.

Walker's work as a multimedia performance artist has been showcased at the Sonic Circuits International Festival and the New West Electronic Arts & Media Organization Festival (NWEAMO), and he is featured on the cover of the April 2007 International Musician magazine. He is currently the Artistic Director of the Colorado NeXt Music Festival.

== Works ==
- Kawanakajima for Video Guitar and Chamber Orchestra (2016)
- [glitch] for CyberGuitar and Symphony Orchestra (2013)
- La La, and the Life Goes On for Violin and Piano (2010)
- Looking for the Perfect Planet for Amplified Chorus and Video Sampler (2009)
- danC for Chamber Orchestra (2008)
- The Passion According to St. Toscanini for Quadraphonic Chorus and Orchestra (2003)
- Dreamcatcher for Electronic Violin and Orchestra (2003)
- 1+1+1=3 for Orchestra (2003)
- Magic Man for Amplified Chamber Orchestra (2002)
- mysterium conceptionis immaculatae for Orchestra (2000)
- Bad Rap for Electric Violin and Chamber Orchestra (Lauren Keiser Music Publishing, 1994)
- Like 'Dis for String Quartet/String Orchestra (1987)
- Dream N. the Hood for Rapper and Orchestra (1993)
