= Bible Way Church of Our Lord Jesus Christ =

African-American Oneness Pentecostal denomination

The Bible Way Church of Our Lord Jesus Christ World-Wide was an African-American Oneness Pentecostal denomination started in 1957 in Washington, DC. In 1997, a division over who was the rightful successor to Presiding Bishop and founder Smallwood Edmond Williams occurred. This dispute ultimately led to the splitting of the church into two separate organizations: a church of the same name led by Huie L. Rogers and the International Bible Way Church Of Jesus Christ led by Cornelius Showell. The church's chief officer was the Presiding Bishop. Both successor bodies conduct a general conference annually in July and operate a publishing house in Washington, DC.

== Beliefs and organization ==
Beliefs of the Bible Way Church of Our Lord Jesus Christ and its successors include the inspiration of the Bible as the word of God; salvation made possible only through Jesus Christ; the baptism of the Holy Spirit with the initial evidence of speaking in tongues; water baptism by immersion in the name of Jesus Christ for the remission of sins; the premillennial second coming of Jesus Christ; the final judgment of the dead; and the establishment of new heavens and a new earth. However, unlike Roman Catholic, Eastern Catholic, or Eastern Orthodox Christianity, it is a non-Trinitarian offshoot religion based upon the Old and New Testaments, teaching that there is only one person in God, i.e. Jesus Christ, and not a Trinity of persons as Christianity confirmed at the Council of Nicea in 325 AD. See Oneness Pentecostalism.

The church was led by a Presiding Bishop and a General Assembly. The General Assembly was composed of bishops, overseers, district elders, pastors, elders, ministers, deacons, missionaries, and laity. Bishops in the church do not claim or maintain succession from the original 12 apostles.

== History ==
The Bible Way Church of Our Lord Jesus Christ was organized in September 1957 by Smallwood Edmond Williams, who at the time was the General Secretary of the Church of Our Lord Jesus Christ of the Apostolic Faith (COOLJC). Under Williams' leadership, about 70 churches withdrew from that organization to form the Bible Way Church, citing the autocratic leadership of COOLJC leader and founder, Bishop Robert C. Lawson. Nearly half of the 177 churches in the organization left and followed Williams. He and four other leading ministers from COOLJC and the Pentecostal Assemblies of the World were soon formally ordained as bishops in a ceremony performed by Bishop John Holly of the PAW. Williams became the first Presiding Bishop of the church.

Williams' daughter, Pearl Williams-Jones, served as the minister of music at the church for many years.

=== Schism ===
A division developed over church governance. After the death of Williams in 1991, the church considered Rogers and Campbell each as a potential leader and visionary for the church. The Order of Succession and Constitution, ratified after the death of Williams, stated that both Lawrence Campbell and Rogers would each serve a three-year trial term. Then the church body would vote to see who would be the official successor to Williams. It is generally agreed that, during the trial period, Campbell was selected to serve the first term and Rogers the second. The order of succession also held that Campbell would serve as Vice Presiding Bishop under Rogers at the end of his tenure as Presider; however, Campbell refused to do so because he saw it as a demotion. This led to a breakdown of the order of succession.

On July 4, 1997, during the 40th Convocation, the General Assembly voted to retain Rogers and his administration for a "Sabbath" year; the reasoning being that during the General Assembly a motion was offered on the floor to accept the Sabbath resolution, which held in part," that voting would be postponed for a Sabbath year and all current officers would remain in place until July of 1998." The motion passed with about 85% in favor and 15% against. But the majority of Bishops wanted Campbell and what happened next came to be called, "the schism".

There are now two separate and distinct organizations: Bible Way Church of Our Lord Jesus Christ World Wide, Inc. headquartered in Brooklyn, New York, and The International Bible Way Church Of Jesus Christ, Inc., headquartered in Washington, DC.

=== International Bible Way Church Of Our Lord Jesus Christ ===
Most bishops, pastors, and churches continued to follow Campbell, making this branch the largest of the two, with approximately 1,000 or more churches worldwide as of 2012. In 2006, Bishop Cornelius Showell, pastor of First Apostolic Faith Church in Baltimore, was appointed Presiding Bishop and Chief Apostle of the International Bible Way Church of Jesus Christ. In 2014, Apostle Floyd E. Nelson Sr. succeeded Showell as Presiding Bishop and Chief Apostle of International Bibleway. While serving his second term, Apostle Nelson was "promoted to glory" on April 2, 2019. Apostle Willie Rookard of Inman, South Carolina, who served as First Vice Presiding Bishop under Apostle Nelson, has now assumed the role of Presiding Bishop to complete Nelson's term.

Women in International Bible Way Church Of Our Lord Jesus Christ

Apostle Campbell began the practice of ordaining women to the office of elder. In July 2006, Showell, appointed Pastor Bonnie Hunter as the first woman District Elder.

In July 2011, Pastor Marcia Fountain (Bridgeport, Connecticut) was appointed as the third woman District Elder.

As of July 2012, Pastor Deborah Barnette-Street, a female pastor from Roxboro North Carolina, is the Diocesan Liaison (of the Central Carolina Diocese) under Apostle Cornelius Showell who serves as the diocese's current Diocesan. She also serves in the office of District Elder in International BibleWay. In addition to being a Diocesan Liaison and District Elder, she is also the Chair of the District Elders for International Bibleway.

As of July 2017, Under the leadership of Apostle Floyd E. Nelson sr it was so moved that District Elder Bonnie Hunter be consecrated to the episcopacy in July 2018 at the 61st Holy Convocation as the First Woman Bishop of International Bibleway.

=== Bible Way Church of Our Lord Jesus Christ World-Wide ===
Though the organizations are similar in structure and doctrine, the major differences reside in ordination of women. This was always a point of contention between Apostle Winfield Showell and Apostle Smallwood Williams. Cornelius Showell, is following the convictions of his Father Winfield A. Showell.
