= Betty Jackson King =

American composer, pianist, and educator

Betty Jackson King (Feb 17, 1928 – June 1, 1994) was an American pianist, singer, teacher, choral conductor, and composer. She was best known for her vocal works.

== Biography ==
King, who was of African American heritage, was born in 1928 in Chicago. She first started learning music from her mother, Gertrude Jackson Taylor. King's father, Reverend Frederick D. Jackson a pastor at the Community Church of Woodlawn, helped expose her to church hymns and spirituals. Along with her mother and sister Catherine, she sang in the Jacksonian Trio. In 1969 when King began teaching at Wildwood High School in New Jersey, she integrated the high school's public school teaching staff.

She was married to Vincent King, had one daughter, Rochelle King, and has two granddaughters Vincena and Joysaleen.

King died on June 1, 1994, in Wildwood, New Jersey.

== Education ==
Betty Jackson King studied throughout her life. She began at Wilson Junior College studying under Esther Goetz Gilliland. She then attended the integrated Chicago Musical College of Roosevelt University where she earned a bachelor's degree in piano and a master's degree in composition. Here she studied different aspects of music: voice with the highly respected Thelma Waide Brown, composition with Hans Tischler and Karel Jirak, and piano with Saul Dorfman.

She also studied music at Glassboro College in New Jersey, Oakland University in Michigan, Westminster Choir College in Princeton, New Jersey, and the Peabody Conservatory in Baltimore, Maryland.

King went on to teach at the University of Chicago Laboratory School, Roosevelt University, Dillard University, and Wildwood High School, where she received the Teaching Recognition Award from former New Jersey Governor Thomas Kean.

She was president of the National Association of Negro Musicians from 1970 to 1984.

King retired from teaching in 1989.

== Compositions ==
King's compositions were often vocal in nature. Her music is part of the "early Chicago classical music tradition" and its style is known for its extended harmonic language, thick chord clusters, and layers of sound. King wrote arrangements of spirituals, operas (Saul of Tarsus, My Servant Job), a cantata (Simon of Cyrene) and a requiem. Saul of Tarsus has had several performances since it was premiered in 1952. She wrote a ballet, Kids in School With Me, and various other chamber and choral compositions. She has a handful of works for solo keyboard including Nuptial Suite, her only known organ work, as well as Aftermath (A Tone Poem) and Four Seasonal Sketches for piano.

=== Piano and Organ ===
- Aftermath (A Tone Poem) (1975)
- Four Seasonal Sketches for piano (1973)
- Mother Goose Parade (1971)
- Nuptial Suite for organ (1969)

=== Songs ===
- A Lullaby for You (1973)
- A Set of Three Dunbar Poems (1975)
- Calvary (1954)
- Climbing High Mountains (1990)
- I Am Crucified With Christ (1971)
- In the Springtime (1979)
- It's Me, O Lord (1988)
- No Harm (1972)
- Rejoice in the Lord Alway (1971)
- The Pledge (1991)
