= Joyce Solomon Moorman =

American composer and educator (born 1946)

Joyce Solomon Moorman (born May 11, 1946) is an American composer and educator.

== Biography ==
Moorman was born in Tuskegee, Alabama on May 11, 1946, and grew up in Columbia, South Carolina. She attended segregated public schools through high school. Moorman earned a bachelor's degree from Vassar College in 1968 and in 1971, a masters of arts from Rutgers University. She earned a masters of fine arts from Sarah Lawrence College in 1975. In 1982, she earned her doctorate from Columbia University.

She taught at the Brooklyn Music School starting in 1982 and leaving in 1993. She has also taught at the Borough of Manhattan Community College, St. John's University, York College, LaGuardia Community College, NYC College and at Brooklyn College.

In 1976, she received a jazz study grant from the National Endowment for the Arts (NEA). In 1998, she was the winner of the Vienna Modern Masters Millennium Commission Competition.

== Works ==
Moorman's work, "The Soul of Nature" premiered with the Detroit Symphony Orchestra in 1990. She composed Race Riot, a work based on Andy Warhol's piece of the same name. It premiered in 2000 at the Pennsylvania Academy. In 2016, the world premiere of Cape Coast Castle was played the Richmond County Orchestra. Cape Coast Castle describes The Door of No Return in Ghana.

Her opera, Elegies for the Fallen, is based on the poetry of Rashidah Ismaili and is a commemoration of the Soweto Massacre.
