= Church of the Lord Jesus Christ =

Pentacostal church in Philadelphia, Pennsylvania

- Classification: Pentecostal
- Orientation: Oneness Pentecostalism
- Governance: Episcopal
- Pastor and General Overseer: Kenneth Shelton
- Founder: Bishop Sherrod C. Johnson
- Origin: 1930; Philadelphia, Pennsylvania, U.S.

The Church of the Lord Jesus Christ, or Church of the Lord Jesus Christ of the Apostolic Faith is a Oneness Pentecostal multi-campus church, with its headquarters located in Philadelphia, Pennsylvania.

== History ==
Founded in 1930 by Bishop Sherrod C. Johnson, the church grew into a network of church locations steming from New England to Florida and as far west as California.

After Johnson's death in early 1961, the church continued under the ministry of the late Bishop S. McDowell Shelton. Bishop S. McDowell Shelton was succeeded in leadership by Bishop Kenneth "Omega" Shelton.

In 1995, both Sheltons were accused of misappropriating the church's funds.

In 2012, a court rejected a leadership dispute case involving members of the denomination.
