= December 1937 =

Month of 1937

<<	December 1937					>>
Su	Mo	Tu	We	Th	Fr	Sa
			1	2	3	4
5	6	7	8	9	10	11
12	13	14	15	16	17	18
19	20	21	22	23	24	25
26	27	28	29	30	31

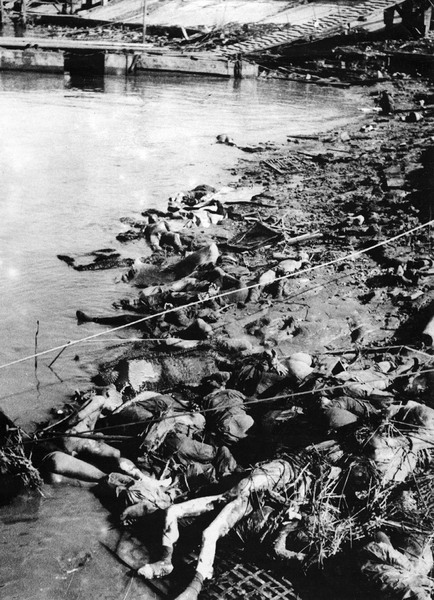
December 13, 1937: Japanese Army captures Nanking and begins massacre of Chinese civilians

The following events occurred in December 1937:

== December 1, 1937 (Wednesday) ==
- The Battle of Nanjing began as Japan's Emperor Hirohito ordered Imperial Army General Iwane Matsui to order the Japanese troops capture and occupy the Chinese capital.
- At a ceremony in Tokyo, Japan formally recognized Francisco Franco as the leader of Spain, in return for the Franco government's recognition of the Japanese puppet state of Manchukuo in China as a legitimate nation. Franco also agreed to add Spain to the Anti-Comintern Pact, created by Nazi Germany and Imperial Japan in 1936, against Communist International.
- Before Nanjing's Mayor Ma Chaochun left the capital, he ordered all civilian residents to relocate to the demilitarized Nanking Safety Zone.
- Otto Meissner, the Chief of Staff for President Hindenburg and for his successor, the Fuhrer Adolf Hitler, was appointed as Germany's Minister of State (Staatsminister).
- Born:
  - Vaira Vīķe-Freiberga, President of Latvia from 1999 to 2007; in Riga
  - Klaas Bom, Dutch engineer and pioneer on ultrasound technology; in Velsen (d.2025)
  - Chuck Low, American character actor in Robert De Niro films; in New York City (d. 2017)
  - Gordon Crosse, English composer; in Bury, Lancashire (d.2021)
- Died: Alfred Lodge, 83, English mathematician and author of British maths textbooks.

== December 2, 1937 (Thursday) ==
- Brazil's President Getulio Vargas, who had taken power in a coup d'état on November 10 and proclaimed the Estado Novo, outlawed all political parties by issuing Decree Number 37. The Mineiro Republican Party, the Paulista Republican Party, and all other political parties were barred from any activities until President Vargas declared otherwise.
- Nationalist Chinese leader Chiang Kai-shek agreed to peace with Japan on the conditions that had been proposed by the German Ambassador to China, Oskar Trautmann on November 5. By then, however, Japan, which had warned that it would only allow a limited time to join in the proposed settlement terms, declined Chiang's offer. On December 7, when German Ambassador Herbert von Dirksen told Japan's Foreign Minister Kōki Hirota about Chiang's willingness to make peace, provided that China would not lose any more territory, Japan rejected the chance to keep Shanghai and other territories.
- In Burgos, the 50-member National Council of the Movement, drawn from the FET and the Juntas de Ofensiva Nacional Sindicalista (JONS), appointed by Francisco Franco and modeled after Italy's Grand Council of Fascism, was sworn into office as the advisory body for Franco.
- Manchukuo and the Franco regime exchanged documents granting each other formal recognition.

- The German stop motion film Die 7 Raben (The Seven Ravens), one of the first animated feature films, premiered in Germany after being released by the Puppentrickfilm studios. Based on the fairy tale of the same name by the Brothers Grimm, the film came to cinemas less than three weeks before Disney's film Snow White and the Seven Dwarfs was released.
- Born:
  - Katherine Hoover, American classical composer; in Elkins, West Virginia (d.2018)
  - Manohar Joshi, Indian politician who served as the Speaker of the Lok Sabha from 2002 to 2004, and Chief Minister of the Maharashtra state from 1995 to 1999; in Nandavi, Bombay State, British India (d.2024)

== December 3, 1937 (Friday) ==
- Neville Chamberlain appointed Harold MacMichael to be the next High Commissioner for Palestine to replace Sir Arthur Grenfell Wauchope, who was retiring for health reasons.

- Japanese forces took Danyang in China's Jiangsu province
- Born:
  - Bobby Allison, American NASCAR stock car driver and team owner, winner of the Daytona 500 in 1978, 1982 and 1988, inductee to the NASCAR Hall of Fame; in Miami (d. 2024)
  - John Seymour, U.S. Senator for California from 1991 to 1992; in Chicago

== December 4, 1937 (Saturday) ==
- Nazi Germany tested its third rocket design, the Aggregat 3 as part of "Operation Lighthouse" supervised by designers Wernher von Braun and Walter Dornberger, launching from the Baltic Sea island of Usedom near Peenemünde. Soon after takeoff, the Aggregat 3 rocket's parachute deployed prematurely and its engine failed, and the rocket crashed, and the second test on December 6 failed as well.
- The children's comic book The Dandy, which would run for 75 years before going out of print was first published in the United Kingdom, marking the first appearance of the character of Desperate Dan.
- Writer Jerry Siegel and artist Joe Shuster signed an employment contract with Detective Comics, Inc. (now "DC"), at a pay rate of $10 per page, where they would soon bring their creation, "Superman", to print. Three months later, on March 1, 1938, they would release their rights to DC for one of the most successful fictional characters in history.
- In Baku, capital of the Azerbaijani SSR of the Soviet Union, Shakespearean actor Abbas Mirza Sharifzadeh was arrested by secret police after returning home from his final performance, a production of the play Macbeth. Sharifzadeh was one of many artists caught in the Great Purge throughout the Soviet Union, and was accused of espionage. He would be executed eleven months later on November 16, 1938, at a prison in Baku.
- Born:
  - Max Baer Jr., American television actor and producer best known for his portrayal of "Jethro Bodine" The Beverly Hillbillies, and producer of the films Macon County Line (1974) and Ode to Billy Joe; in Oakland, California as the son of former world heavyweight champion boxer Max Baer Sr. and Mary Sullivan Baer
  - Stewart R. Mott, American philanthropist; in Flint, Michigan as the son of General Motors co-founder C. S. Mott and Ruth Rawlings Mott (d.2008)
  - Valentin Kuptsov, Soviet Russian politician who served as the last leader of the Russian SFSR Communist Party before the dissolution of the Soviet Union; in Mindyukino
- Died:
  - Sahibzada Abdul Qayyum Khan, 73, Chief Minister of British India's North-West Frontier Province for five months, died of an apparent stroke.
  - Elín Briem, 81, Icelandic writer and teacher known for her popular book Kvennafræðarinn (The Women's Teacher) as a guide to housekeeping and cooking
  - Ralph Lewis, 65, American silent film actor in D. W. Griffith's films The Birth of a Nation (1915) and Intolerance (1916), died nine days after being struck by a limousine driven by Jack L. Warner's chauffeur.

== December 5, 1937 (Sunday) ==
- The General Labour Confederation of Belgium (Flemish, Belgisch Vakverbond; French, Confédération Générale du Travail de Belgique) was created from an agreement between 26 labor unions, including the 121,000-member General Union (construction and factory workers), the 116,000-member Union of the Belgian Metal Industry and more than 300,000 members from other occupations, becoming the largest trade union federation in the kingdom. In 1945, the General Confederation would merge with two other labor unions to form the General Labour Federation of Belgium.
- In China, the Great Way Municipal Government of Shanghai was created by Japan as a puppet government to administer the occupation of Shanghai. With the assistance of banker Fu Xiao'an, Japan selected Professor Su Xiwen (a graduate of Japan's Waseda University) as Shanghai's mayor, and Zhang Songlin as the city police chief, though another collaborator, Wang Zihui, oversaw most of the administration.
- Emperor Hirohito's uncle Prince Yasuhiko Asaka took over command of the Japanese Shanghai Expeditionary Army besieging Nanjing.
- Yugoslavian Prime Minister Milan Stojadinović held talks with Benito Mussolini in Rome.
- The Tax Foundation was formed by four business executives as a think tank of taxation experts for sharing and publishing of research on matters affecting American tax policy, with a goal "to monitor the tax and spending policies of government agencies". The founders were General Motors Chairman Alfred P. Sloan Jr. and GM Financial Vice President Donaldson Brown, William S. Farish, President of Standard Oil Company of New Jersey, Lewis H. Brown, President of Johns-Manville Corporation, with Brown becoming the foundation's first chairman.
- Died: Gustave Verbeek, 70, American cartoonist, known for the comic strip The Upside Downs of Little Lady Lovekins and Old Man Muffaroo, which had two different stories depending on which way the panels were viewed.

== December 6, 1937 (Monday) ==
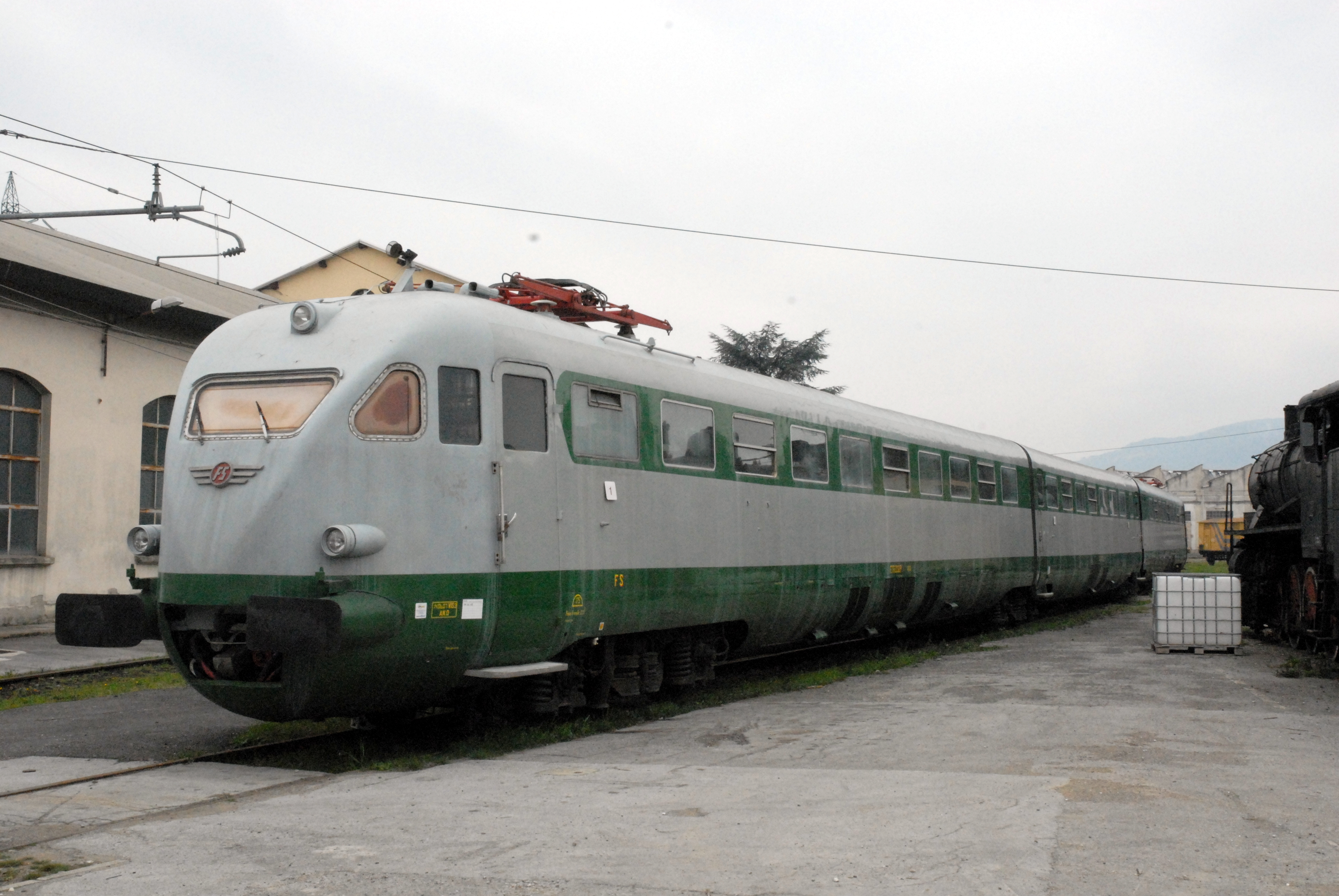
The ETR 200

- Italy inaugurated the first train service to exceed 200 kilometers per hour, with its FS Class ETR 200, setting a world record by averaging 201 kilometres per hour (125 mph) from Campoleone to Nettunia on its Bologna-Rome-Naples express route.
- The U.S. Supreme Court decided Breedlove v. Suttles, unanimously upholding the constitutionality of the poll tax, used to discourage voter registration as not being a violation of the equal protection clause of the 14th Amendment to the U.S. Constitution. The suit had been brought by Nolan Breedlove, a white resident of the U.S. state of Georgia. The state would abolish its poll tax in 1945, and poll taxes in all other states would be barred with the ratification in 1966 of the 24th Amendment.
- The Court also decided, by a 5 to 4 decision, James v. Dravo Contracting Co., determining that in some instances, an individual American state could tax the U.S. government, marking the first departure from previous decisions that held taxation by the states on the federal government to be a violation of the "Supremacy Clause" in Article Six of the Constitution, and introducing the "legal incidence test" for tax cases.
- Ford C. Frick was re-elected president of baseball's National League for another three-year term.
- Born:
  - Alberto Spencer, Ecuadorian footballer who played for both the Ecuadorian national team (11 caps) and the Uruguayan national team (5 caps); in Ancón (d. 2006)
  - Gene Case, American advertising executive known for memorable ad campaigns; in Knoxville, Tennessee (d.2010)
- Died: Francis Cadell, 54, Scottish painter, died from cancer. Lindsay McIntosh, "Colourful life of Scottish national treasure", The Times (London) October 20, 2011

== December 7, 1937 (Tuesday) ==
- Turkey renounced its May 1926 Treaty of Friendship with the French Mandate of Syria and threatened war over jurisdiction of the former Sanjak of Alexandretta, part of the Aleppo Province, which had been under French control after the defeat of the Ottoman Empire in World War One. The crisis would be solved by the creation, on September 2, 1938, of the Republic of Hatay, which would then join Turkey as the Hatay Province on July 23, 1939.
- Japanese forces reached the walls of Nanjing.
- In the Italian colony of Ethiopia, the Sixth Arab-Somali Battalion of the Italian Army was completely destroyed by the nationalist guerrillas led by Mengesha Jembere.
- The Soviet Union announced the creation of the "Bloc of Communists and Non-Partisans" (Blok Kommunistov i Biespartjinych), a political alliance between the Soviet Communist Party and people who were not Party members, in order to nominate candidates for all elections to the Soviet Union's December 12 election for the nation's two houses of Parliament, the Soviet of the Union and the Soviet of Nationalities. The Bloc would continue to exist until the last Soviet Union elections in 1991.
- The U.S. city of Bethlehem, Pennsylvania, founded on Christmas Eve of 1741, became the first American city to have a Christmas tree lighting, and adopted the nickname Christmas City USA in a ceremony.
- Joseph Davidson Qualtrough was appointed by King George VI of Britain as the Speaker of the House of Keys, the lower house of the 24-member legislature of the Isle of Man, and would hold the post for more than 22 years until his death in 1960.
- Austria banned several books critical of Nazism, including Rudolf Olden's book about Hitler.
- Brabourne Stadium, the largest cricket ground in India, was opened by the Cricket Club of India in the Churchgate neighborhood of Mumbai.
- The Boston Red Sox acquired the contract of 19-year old Ted Williams from the San Diego Padres of the Pacific Coast League, elevating Williams to Major League Baseball by the 1939 season.
- Born:
  - Artemio Panganiban, Chief Justice of the Supreme Court of the Philippines from 2005 to 2007, and Associate Justice from 1995 to 2005; in Sampaloc, Manila
  - Thad Cochran, U.S. Representative for Mississippi from 1973 to 1978, and then U.S. Senator for the state for 39 years from 1978 to 2018; in Pontotoc, Mississippi (d. 2019)
  - Kenneth Colley, British film and television actor known for his role as "Admiral Piett" in The Empire Strikes Back (1980) and Return of the Jedi (1983); in Manchester, England (d. 2025)
  - Ron Labinski, American architect and designer of sports venues; in Buffalo, New York (d. 2023)

== December 8, 1937 (Wednesday) ==
- With Japanese troops occupying more territory in China, the provinces of Suiyuan and Chahar in the Inner Mongolia region were declared independent as the Republic of Mengjiang by a Mongol warlord, Demchugdongrub. The new nation worked to cooperate with the Japanese invaders, with Demchugdongrub signed agreements Japan and with the puppet state of Manchukuo, and set up his capital at Hebei.
- At a secret meeting of the Cabinet of British Prime Minister Neville Chamberlain, the ministers voted against the partition of the British Mandate for Palestine that had been recommended by the Peel Commission, which had proposed three plans. The government then appointed the three-member Woodhead Commission (officially, the Palestine Partition Commission), led by Sir John Woodhead, to conclude that the geographic partition of Palestine could not be carried out successfully.
- Nationalist aircraft in Spain bombed Barcelona as directed by Francisco Franco.
- Eugen Weidmann was arrested by French police for murder. Weidmann shot one officer in the arm with a revolver, but the other officer managed to beat him down with a hammer.
- The Brazilian football club Esporte Clube Flamengo was founded.
- Born:
  - Michael Bowen, American artist and pioneer in the Visionary art movement; in Beverly Hills, California (d. 2009)
  - James MacArthur, American actor known for Hawaii Five-O; in Los Angeles as the son of actress Helen Hayes and screenwriter Charles MacArthur(d. 2010)
  - Arne Næss Jr., German businessman and mountaineer(d. 2004)
  - Shahabuddin Rathod, Gujarati Indian humorist and book author; in Thangadh, Jhalavad princely state, British India (now the state of Gujarat in India).
- Died:
  - Hans Molisch, 81, Czech-born Austrian botanist known for creating Molisch's test, a chemical test for detecting carbohydrates.
  - Rossa Matilda Richter, 77, English aerialist and actress who was the first woman to perform the human cannonball. Billed under the stage name of "Zazel, the Beautiful Human Cannonball", she would be fired from a spring equipped cannon and fly through the air to be caught by a net.
  - Mikhail Ostroumov, 57, Russian Orthodox bishop, venerated as a saint, was executed along with other prisoners in the Katyn forest
  - Ahmet Baitursynuly, 65, Soviet Kazach linguist and orthographer, was killed in a prison at Almaty.
  - Geo Shkurupiy (artistic name for Yuri Danylovych), 34, Soviet Ukrainian screenwriter and journalist, was shot in prison at Leningrad.
  - Alexei Voshchakin, 39, Soviet Russian painter, was shot in prison at Leningrad.;
  - Wallace Arthur Sabin, 67, English composer and organist

== December 9, 1937 (Thursday) ==
- The Imperial Japanese Army crossed into the Chinese capital, Nanjing, for the first time in the war between Japan and China.
- Joseph P. Kennedy accepted the post of United States Ambassador to the United Kingdom.
- Nazi Germany and the oil-producing Kingdom of Romania signed an economic treaty giving Germany first option to purchase Romania petroleum in order to fuel the Nazi military.
- Astronomer Rebecca Jones discovered the supernova SN 1937F within the galactic cluster NGC 3184, located more than 40 million light-years from Earth.
- Born:
  - Bertrice Small, bestselling American author of romance novels; in Manhattan, New York City (d. 2015)
  - Darwin Joston (stage name for Francis Darwin Solomon), American stage and film actor; in Winston-Salem, North Carolina (d. 1998)
- Died:
  - Gustaf Dalén, 68, Swedish physicist and 1912 laureate of the Nobel Prize in Physics for his invention of a solar-powered automatic regulator to shut off the flow of fuel to machinery during daylight
  - Charles Émile Egli, 60, French illustrator and engraver who used the pen name "Carlègle".
  - Lilias Armstrong, 55, English phonetics expert for the Somali language and the Kikuyu language, died from a stroke after contracting influenza.
  - Michael B. Ellis, 43, U.S. Army sergeant and Medal of Honor recipient for heroism in World War One, died of pneumonia

== December 10, 1937 (Friday) ==
- The 1937 Nobel Prizes were awarded in Stockholm. The recipients were Clinton Davisson of the United States and George Paget Thomson of the United Kingdom for Physics, Norman Haworth (United Kingdom) and Paul Karrer (Switzerland) for Chemistry, Albert Szent-Györgyi (Hungary) for Physiology or Medicine and Roger Martin du Gard (France) for Literature. In Oslo, Robert Cecil (United Kingdom) was awarded the Peace Prize for his work at the League of Nations.
- A train crash killed 35 people in Scotland, and injured 179 others at Castlecary, after a signalman's error sent the Edinburgh—Glasgow express down the track to where the Dundee—Glasgow train was stopped at a signal. All of the dead and injured were on the Dundee train that that had been struck from behind by the Edinburgh train.
- The Japanese Army pushed into Wuhu and Zhenjiang.
- William Grant Still's second symphony was given its inaugural performance, played by the Philadelphia Orchestra and conducted by Leopold Stokowski.
- Born: Jack Bond, British film director and producer known for the 1967 psychological thriller Separation; in London (d.2024)
- Died:
  - Mírzá Muhammad ʻAlí, 83, Iraqi-born religious leader who caused a schism within the Baháʼí Faith
  - Fyodor Golovin, 69, former Chairman of the State Duma during the reign of the Tsar Nicholas II, was executed on a conviction of "belonging to an anti-Soviet organization"
  - General Vladimir Lyubimov was shot hours after being convicted in a court-martial of espionage.
  - Rashid Khan Kaplanov, 54, former Azerbaijan leader, was executed.

== December 11, 1937 (Saturday) ==
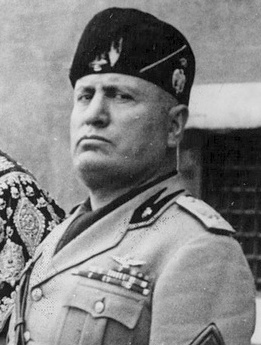
Italy's Premier Mussolini

- Italy quit the League of Nations as Premier Benito Mussolini announced the kingdom's formal withdrawal from the international body, and dared the world's democracies to declare war. After a seven-minute meeting with the Fascist Grand Council, Mussolini walked out on to a balcony at the Palazzo Venezia in Rome and delivered a speech in a heavy rain to more than 100,000 of his supporters. Italy told the cheering crowd, "We are leaving a tumbling temple where there is no talk of peace, but where wars are prepared. We are not afraid of the threats of democracy, which leave us indifferent. We have many land and sea and air weapons tempered in two victorious wars.",
- The Republic of China capital, formerly Nanjing, was officially proclaimed to be Chongqing in the Sichuan province.
- The ocean liner President Hoover ran aground at Kasho-to off Taiwan. The 503 passengers and crew were evacuated and the ship was declared a total loss.
- The Toronto Argonauts edged the Winnipeg Blue Bombers 4 to 3, to win the Grey Cup, the championship of Canadian football. Toronto led, 3–1, on a field goal and a one-point rouge in the first quarter, while Winnipeg's points came on three rouges.
- The Tamil language Indian musical Ambikapathy, directed by Ellis R. Dungan of the U.S. and starring M. K. Thyagaraja Bhagavathar as the title character, premiered in British India.
- Born:
  - Jim Harrison, American novella author known for Legends of the Fall, made into a 1994 film of the same name; in Grayling, Michigan (d. 2016).
  - Daya Wimalaweera, Sri Lankan film director and producer known for the action film Seethala Gini Kandu ("Cold Volcanoes"); in Grandpass, British Ceylon (d.2019)
- Died:
  - Seraphim Chichagov, 81, Russian Orthodox bishop, was executed at the Butovo firing range, 11 days after he had been arrested by the NKVD on charges of "monarchist propaganda".
  - Jaan Anvelt, 53, founder and former chairman of the Estonian Communists, died from injuries inflicted by his NKVD interrogator, Aleksandr Langfang. Langfang would be dismissed from the KGB in 1956, arrested and found guilty of the killing in 1957, and would serve 15 years in prison.
  - Sargis Lukashin, 53, Chairman of the Armenian Council of People's Commissars and former First Secretary of the Armenian Communist Party, was executed six months after being arrested on charges of counterrevolutionary activity.
  - Mamia Orakhelashvili, 56, former First Secretary of the Communist Party of Georgia, was executed

== December 12, 1937 (Sunday) ==
- The U.S. Navy gunboat USS Panay was fired upon, bombed and sank by Japanese aircraft and shore batteries, while it was evacuating personnel from the embassy at Nanjing along the Yangtze River. The attack wounded 45 servicemen, two of them fatally, and killed civilians on the Panay, and the Japanese airplanes killed numerous civilians on other ships on the Yangtze.
- Parliamentary elections were held in the Soviet Union for the new Supreme Soviet of the Soviet Union, created in the 1936 Constitution to replace the former "Congress of Soviets". Voting was for candidates for all 569 seats of the lower house (the Soviet of the Union) and the 574 seats of the upper house (the Soviet of Nationalities). Although the Soviet Communist Party had initially announced that voters would have a choice of more than one candidate on the ballot, the vote was limited to the tradition of a Party-approved list of unopposed candidates in each district, with the option of crossing out the name. Although most of the candidates were members of the Communist Party, the slate of candidates included 108 for the Soviet of the Union and 165 for the Soviet of Nationalities who were not members of the only legal political party, and designated as "independents". The result was more than 89 million in favor of the candidate list, and less than 563,000 voting against.
- Mae West appeared on The Chase and Sanborn Hour with Edgar Bergen and performed a sexually suggestive "Adam and Eve" sketch. In one sequence, the snake in the Garden of Eden tries to squeeze through a fence as West exhorts: "Oh, shake your hips! ... Yeah, you're doing all right. Get me a big one, I feel like doing a big apple." West was unofficially banned from the radio for years afterward as a result.
- The Washington Redskins beat the Chicago Bears 28–21, in the NFL Championship Game at Wrigley Field in Chicago.
- The 1938 NFL draft was held in Chicago. Corbett Davis was selected first overall by the Cleveland Rams.
- The six-team American Football League, the second league of that name to be intended by as a competitor to the NFL, played its final game, with the Los Angeles Bulldogs (7–0–0) defeating the Cincinnati Bengals (2–2–2), 14 to 3.
- Born:
  - Connie Francis (stage name for Concetta Franconero) American singer known for Who's Sorry Now?" (1957) and "Everybody's Somebody's Fool"(1960); in Newark, New Jersey (d. 2025)
  - Buford Pusser, American county sheriff who survived multiple attempts to kill him, and who inspired the popular 1973 film Walking Tall; in Adamsville, Tennessee (killed in auto accident, 1974)
- Died: Alfred Abel, 58, German film actor, director and producer

== December 13, 1937 (Monday) ==
- The Battle of Nanjing ended 32 days after it began as the city's last defenders, the 67th Division of the Chinese Army, abandoned their positions at 2:00 in the morning and retreated to Xiaguan. Two hours later, the 38th Regiment of the Imperial Japanese Army scaled the Zhonghua Gate and found the city deserted. By late morning, all major gates of the walled city had been captured and Japanese troops from the 6th and 114th Divisions of the Army became the first to enter the city of the former Chinese capital. Chinese estimates were 47,382 soldiers killed in the battle, while Japanese estimates were almost 2,000 killed.
- As Japanese troops came in, the Nanjing Massacre of more than 100,000 civilians and prisoners of war began, with troops raping and killing women and children over the next six weeks inside the city and the surrounding countryside.
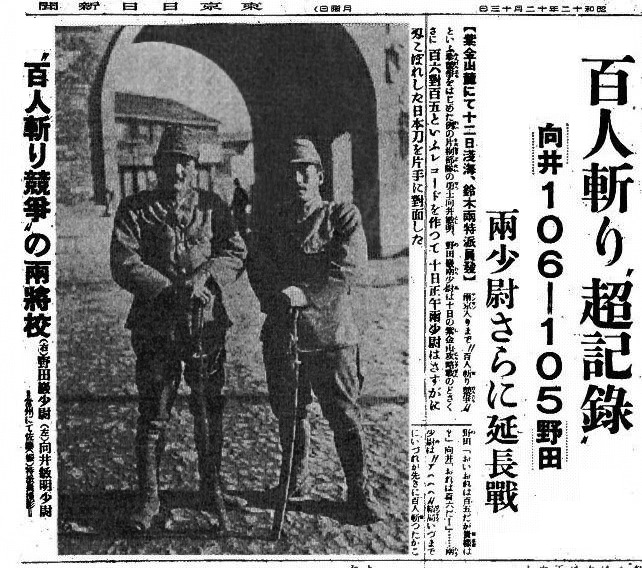
  Mukai and Noda posing for a news photo
  Notably, two officers from the Japanese 16th Division, Toshiaki Mukai and Tsuyoshi Noda, had a contest to become the first person to kill 100 people with a sword, with the competition being profiled in the Tokyo newspaper Nichi Shimbun and other papers covering the contest as it was a sporting event. The civilian population of Nanjing, counted at 1,019,667 in March, had fallen to 150,000 by the end of the year.
- The patent application for the first electric toothbrush, invented by Tomlinson Moseley, and sold as the "Motodent", was filed with the U.S. Patent Office. Patent 2,196,667 would be granted on April 9, 1940.
- The North American Regional Broadcasting Agreement (NABLA) was signed in Havana in Cuba by the U.S., Canada, Mexico, Cuba, the Dominican Republic and Haiti, allocating the radio broadcasting frequencies to be used by each nation, and adding the 10 AM radio frequencies in the range of 1510 to 1600 kilohertz.
- U.S. President Roosevelt demanded that Japan apologize for the Panay attack, render compensation and provide a guarantee that no such thing would happen again.
- In Rome, Pope Pius XI created five new cardinals, in his last appointments before his death, elevating the number of cardinals from 55 to 60, of whom more than half (39) were Italian.
- Former world heavyweight champion Max Schmeling of Germany defeated challenger Harry Thomas of the U.S. in the 8th round of a 15-round bout at Madison Square Garden in New York. Thomas would admit 13 months later that he had been paid $8,500 by gamblers to lose the fight.
- Born:
  - Alice K. Hartley, American computer scientist and expert in programming language; in Bridgeport, Connecticut (d.2017)
  - Ron Taylor, Canadian MLB pitcher and inductee to the Canadian Baseball Hall of Fame; in Toronto (d.2025)

== December 14, 1937 (Tuesday) ==
- The Provisional Government of the Republic of China was established by Japan as a puppet state with a capital at Beijing and former Chinese Finance Minister Wang Kemin (referred to in the Western press as "Wang K'e-ming") as its head of state. The boundaries of the "provisional republic" consisted of the Japanese-occupied provinces of Hebei, Shandong, Shanxi, Henan and Jiangsu. Wang would serve until March 30, 1940, and be tried for treason after the liberation of China in 1945.
- Local elections were held in the Philippines, marred by rioting around the country which killed three people. It was the first Philippine election in which women could vote.
- The drama film Mannequin starring Joan Crawford and Spencer Tracy. premiered in Westwood, Los Angeles.
- Died:
  - Yekaterina Vazem, 89, Russian prima ballerina
  - Kate Sturges Buckingham, 79, American art collector and philanthropist known for commissioning and donating the Buckingham Fountain in Chicago's Grant Park

== December 15, 1937 (Wednesday) ==
- The Greek Operation, a mass persecution of the Soviet Greek minority, was started by Directive No. 50215 of the NKVD, signed by the secret police agency's director, Nikolai Yezhov. On December 11, Yezhov declared that "on December 15 of this year, simultaneously in all republics, territories and regions, arrests are to be made of all Greeks suspected of espionage, sabotage, rebel and nationalist anti-Soviet work," based on an NKVD investigation that concluded that Greek operatives were "actively conducting espionage, sabotage, and rebellious work in the USSR, carrying out assignments from British, German, and Japanese intelligence." Over the next 13 years, Greek-language institutions were closed, mass arrests took place, and at least 15,000 were executed, with 20,000 deported to the Gulag prisons, while another author would estimate the number of deaths at more than 50,000.
- The Battle of Teruel, a turning point in the Spanish Civil War and one of its bloodiest clashes, began in Spain's Province of Teruel during one of the coldest winters in Spain's history. Although Francisco Franco's Nationalists would defeat the Spanish Republican Army by February 22, each side sustained nearly 60,000 casualties.
- An avalanche in Tirol, Austria killed 9 people.
- John Hanna Robb became the leader of the Northern Ireland Senate.
- Born: John Sladek, American science fiction author known for Roderick (1980) and its sequel, and for Tik-Tok (1983); in Waverly, Iowa (d. 2000)

== December 16, 1937 (Thursday) ==
- Theodore Cole and Ralph Roe took part in the second known escape attempt from Alcatraz Federal Penitentiary. Their remains were never found and their fate remains unknown.
- Nazi Germany restricted the issuing of passports to Jews to exceptional cases such as emigration, traveling in the economic interest of Germany, serious illness or death.
- The Imperial Japanese Army disregarded the demilitarized status of the Nanking Safety Zone, set up in the foreign section of the Chinese city, and invaded the refugee shelter at the Overseas Chinese Club, driving out more than 5,000 of the 7,500 Chinese refugees toward the Zhongshan Dock on the Yangtze River, and then shooting them to death.
- The Noel Gay musical Me and My Girl opened at the Victoria Palace Theatre on London's West End for the first of 1,646 performances.
- Born Mitsuo Kamata, Japanese footballer with 44 games for the Japanese national team; in Ibaraki, Ibaraki Prefecture

== December 17, 1937 (Friday) ==
- Six new sections of Germany's four-lane highway, the Autobahn, totaling 218 kilometres (135 mi) were opened.
- In the U.S., the Skyline Caverns, now a tourist attraction in Warren County, Virginia, near Front Royal, were discovered by retired geologist Walter S. Amos.
- The American film Daughter of Shanghai, starring Anna May Wong and Charles Bickford, and featuring Buster Crabbe, Anthony Quinn, Philip Ahn and J. Carrol Naish,
- Born:
  - Kerry Packer, Australian media tycoon, billionaire and sportsman, known for founding World Series Cricket and for owning a controlling interest in Australian television's Nine Network and the Australian Consolidated Press; in Sydney (d. 2005)
  - Joseph Reed, American diplomat and Chief of Protocol of the U.S. from 1989 to 1991; in New York City (d.2016)
  - Jacqueline Daane-van Rensburg, Afrikaner and anti-apartheid activist known for campaigns against South African racist policies; in Cape Town

== December 18, 1937 (Saturday) ==
- The Romanian pro-Fascist newspaper Țara Noastră ordered its readers to use every means to prevent Jews from voting in Monday's election. Jews were warned to stay away from the polls as their presence might provoke "reflex movements."
- Born:
  - Sami-ul-Haq, Pakistani Islamic scholar, founder of the Darul Uloom Haqqania seminary for the leaders of the Taliban; in Akora Khattak, North-West Frontier Province, British India, now in Pakistan (assassinated, 2018)
  - Karen DeCrow, American attorney and advocate equal women's rights, president of the National Organization for Women from 1974 to 1977; in Chicago (d.2014)
- Died: Robert Worth Bingham, 66, American newspaper publisher of The Courier-Journal of Louisville, and U.S. Ambassador to the United Kingdom from 1933 to 1937, died of complications from Hodgkin's lymphoma, less than one month after returning home.

== December 19, 1937 (Sunday) ==
- English author J. R. R. Tolkien wrote to C. A. Furth of Allen & Unwin, the firm which had published Tolkien's novel The Hobbit on September 21, saying, "I have written the first chapter of a new story about Hobbits - 'A long expected party'. A merry Christmas." This would become the first chapter of The Lord of the Rings.
- Japanese Ambassador Hiroshi Saito made a radio address to the American people saying that the Panay attack was a "shocking blunder", and that Japan would be "only too anxious" to make amends.
- Martha Graham's ballet Deep Song was given its first performance, premiering at the Guild Theatre in New York City
- Born:
  - G. B. Pattanaik, Chief Justice of India in 2002 and judge on the Supreme Court of India from 1995 to 2002; in Cuttack, Orissa Province, British India
  - Marlene Clark, African-American actress known for the horror film Ganja & Hess and the TV series Sanford and Son; in New York City (d.2023)
  - Albert Moses, Sri Lankan and British actor, known for the British ITV sitcom Mind Your Language; in Gampola, British Ceylon (d.2017)
- Died: Dmitry Shuvayev, 83, Soviet Russian military officer who served as the Ministry of War of the Russian Empire for the Tsar Nicholas II during World War One, was executed two weeks after his arrest by the NKVD.

== December 20, 1937 (Monday) ==
- A fire killed 81 schoolchildren and adults at the Minami Tomita Elementary School in Minami—Tomita (now part of Shirahama) in Wakayama Prefecture. According to reports, the fire broke out while 300 students and 150 adults were in the school auditorium to watch a film about the ongoing war between Japan in China.
- Elections for all 387 seats of Romania's Camera Deputaților. The Partidul Național Liberal (PNL) of Minister Secretary of State Dinu Brătianu lost 148 of its 300 seats and its majority, but retained a plurality with 152 seats, while the National Peasants' Party (Partidul Național Țărănesc or PNT) of former Prime Minister Iuliu Maniu was second, increasing its share from 29 seats to 86. Elections for the Romanian Senate were held on December 22, 28 and 30.
- Britain announced that Hughe Knatchbull-Hugessen would not return to his post as ambassador to China and that Archibald Clark Kerr, 1st Baron Inverchapel would take his place.
- Born:
  - Kuei Chih-Hung, Chinese Hong Kong film producer, known for the 1983 film The Boxer's Omen; in Guangzhou (d. 1999)
  - U.S. Marine Corps gunnery sergeant and recipient of the Medal of Honor for heroism in the Vietnam War; in Caledonia, Arkansas (d.2022)
- Died: Erich Ludendorff, 72, German general who led his army to victory at the Battle of Tannenberg and the Battle of Liège in 1914 and oversaw German strategy from 1916 to Germany's surrender in 1918 in World War One, died while recovering from surgery.

== December 21, 1937 (Tuesday) ==
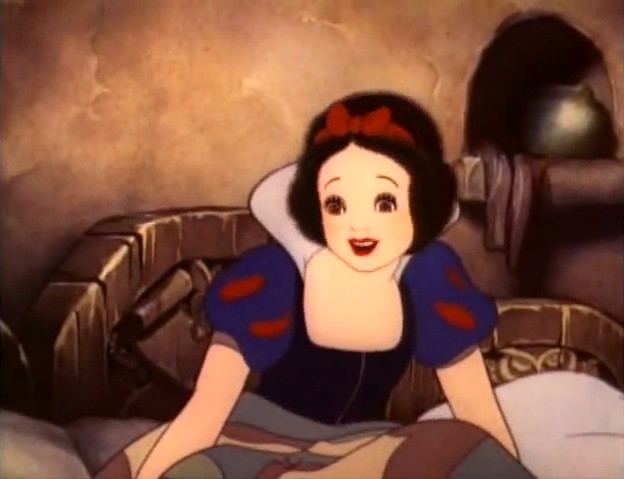
Disney's depiction of Snow White

- The Walt Disney animated film Snow White and the Seven Dwarfs, the first full-length animated feature film in the U.S., was shown for the first time, premiering at the Carthay Circle Theatre in Hollywood. It would become the highest-grossing film of 1938 upon its nationwide premiere on February 4.
- New York City's Lincoln Tunnel under the Hudson River and running between Weehawken, New Jersey and Manhattan, was dedicated and opened to the public.
- The Swiss Criminal Code was approved by the Federal Assembly of Switzerland, to go into effect starting on January 1, 1942, to provide a uniform criminal law for every canton in the nation.
- Prince Amedeo, Duke of Aosta became Italy's Governor-General of Italian East Africa, governing the former Empire of Ethiopia.
- The New York City Board of Aldermen, the 65-member unicameral legislature for New York City and its seven million residents, convened for the last time, and was replaced in 1938 by the 35-member New York City Council.
- Born:
  - Jane Fonda, American film actress, social activist and fitness instructor; to socialite Frances Ford Seymour and film actor Henry Fonda in New York City
  - Viktor Gerashchenko, Russian banker who directed the USSR State Bank from 1989 to 1991, and the Central Bank of Russia, 1992-1994 and 1998–2002; in Leningrad (now Saint Petersburg (d.2025)
- Died:
  - Frank B. Kellogg, 80, U.S. Secretary of State from 1925 to 1929 and Nobel Peace Prize laureate, known for the Kellogg–Briand Pact, died from pneumonia following a stroke.
  - Ted Healy, 41, American actor and comedian, known for creating The Three Stooges, died from toxic nephritis secondary to chronic alcoholism, hours after a fist fight at the Trocadero nightclub in Los Angeles.

== December 22, 1937 (Wednesday) ==
- Germany's Ambassador to Japan, Herbert von Dirksen, came to China and presented Japan's terms for a Chinese surrender to the Chinese-Japanese War, with a two-week deadline of January 5 for a reply by China's leader Chiang Kai-shek. The conditions were that China would pay war reparations to Japan, to acknowledge the loss of China's Manchurian territory that had become the puppet state of Manchukuo, to acknowledge Inner Mongolia's autonomy, and the withdrawal of troops from designated demilitarized zones in North China and inner Mongolia. Chiang let the January 5 deadline with no reply.

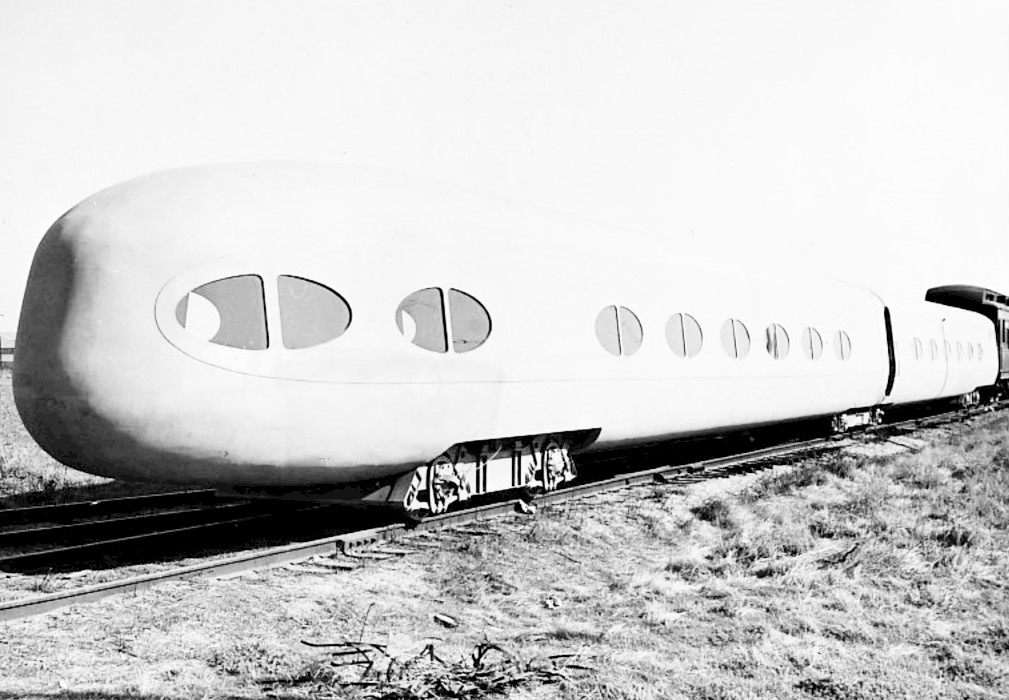
The PERC rail car

- The prototype of the first "pendulum car" for railroad travel was unveiled by the Pacific Railway Equipment Company (PERC) at its factory in Los Angeles. Testing scheduled of the car, designed to tilt while traveling on curves to begin on the Atchison, Topeka and Santa Fe Railway.
- The French Social Party was banned in France. François de La Rocque and other leaders of the party were ordered by court to pay fines for reconstituting a political league that was supposed to have been dissolved.

== December 23, 1937 (Thursday) ==
- The NBC Red Network banned the mention of Mae West's name on all of its stations to avoid any possible revival of the "Adam and Eve" controversy from the December 12 episode of The Chase and Sanborn Hour with risque dialogue between West and Charlie McCarthy (voiced by Edgar Bergen).
- The American Contract Bridge League, the largest organization in North America of players of the card game bridge, was created by a merger of the American Bridge League and the United States Bridge Association.
- Born:
  - Nelson Shanks, American artist; in Rochester, New York (d. 2015).
  - Karol J. Bobko, U.S. astronaut who served on three separate space shuttles, on Columbia (STS-6, 1983); Challenger (STS-51-D, 1985) and Discovery (STS-51-J, 1985); in Queens, New York City (d. 2023)
- Died: St. Michael Blagievsky, 63, Russian archpriest who would be canonized by the Russian Orthodox Church, was executed in prison after being convicted of "anti-Soviet counter-revolutionary activity".

== December 24, 1937 (Friday) ==
- The Japanese Army captured and occupied Hangzhou, capital of the Zhejiang province.
- The government of Japan acknowledged its responsibility for the December 12 sinking of the gunboat USS Panay and three American freighters and the Emperor Hirohito pledged that aggression by Japan against U.S. vessels would not happen again. In Tokyo, Foreign Minister Koki Hirota personally handed a diplomatic note to U.S. Ambassador Joseph C. Grew.

== December 25, 1937 (Saturday) ==
- The Panay incident was closed when the United States formally accepted Japan's apologies.
- Arturo Toscanini conducted the NBC Symphony Orchestra on the radio for the first time.
- George VI delivered his first Royal Christmas Message. At four minutes it was the shortest Message to date.
- Died:
  - Newton D. Baker, 66, U.S. Secretary of War from 1916 to 1921 during World War One
  - Hsiung Hsi-ling, 67, Premier of China for seven months from 1913 to 1914

== December 26, 1937 (Sunday) ==
- The Soviet Union began the deportation of its ethnic Chinese citizens, as NKVD Order No. 62833 was issued by Director Nikolai Yezhov. The Chairman of the NKVD's Far East department, Genrikh Lyushkov, had been selected to carry mass arrests. The day after the issuance of the order, Yezhov published the "Plan to Suppress Chinese Traitors and Spies" to outline the bases for arrests, executions and deportations. Over the next two years, an estimated 19,000 ethnic Chinese were forcibly relocated from the Russian SFSR to the Kazakh SSR and the Uzbek SSR.
- Romanian Prime Minister Gheorghe Tătărescu and his cabinet resigned after the disappointing performance in of the National Liberal Party in the December 20 elections.
- La Julia Rhea and William Franklin became the first black opera singers to star in the production of a major opera company, as they appeared together as Aida and Amonasro in the Chicago Civic Opera's presentation of Giuseppe Verdi's Aida. Chicago Tribune theatre critic Cecil Smith wrote the next day, " "A musical event without parallel in grand opera in America took place at the Civic Opera House last night..."
- Born:
  - John Horton Conway, English mathematician and writer, known for the "Doomsday rule" for calculating days of the week on a particular date, Conway's Game of Life and the Conway criterion; in Liverpool (d. 2020 from COVID-19)
  - Jean Van Leeuwen, American author of children's books, known for her Oliver and Amanda Pig and The Great Mouse Gang series of books; in Glen Ridge, New Jersey (d. 2025)

== December 27, 1937 (Monday) ==
- After crossing the Yellow River on December 23, the 10th Division of the Japan's Manchurian Area Army captured Jinan, capital of China's Shandong province. Despite being ordered by his superiors to defend Jinan to the last man, General Han Fuju and his Chinese Nationalist Army troops abandoned the city, after burning the provincial government offices and the Japanese consulate. General Han was subsequently arrested by the Nationalist Army Chief of Staff, General Hu Zongnan, and executed for disobeying orders.
- Yangmingshan, the first national park on the Japanese island of Formosa (now Taiwan island, the Republic of China) was created by the Japanese Governor-General, Seizō Kobayashi with the name "Daiton National Park", in an area around Datun Mountain.
- The Japanese Mongolia Garrison Army was raised, under the command of General Shigeru Hasunuma, and charged with the task of defending China's Inner Mongolia region from a possible attack from the neighboring Soviet Union, which was, at the time, not an enemy of Japan.
- African-American schoolteacher Harriet Brown achieved a major victory after her employer, the Calvert County Board of Education in the U.S. state of Maryland for racial discrimination, settled the case and agreed to equal pay for its employees, regardless of race. Before the suit, brought by future U.S. Supreme Court Justice Thurgood Marshall, led to a similar settlement by the Montgomery County Public Schools and, in 1939, the passage by the state legislature of the Maryland Teachers Pay Equalization Law.

== December 28, 1937 (Tuesday) ==
- King Carol II appointed Octavian Goga of the fascist National Christian Party (Partidul Național Creștin or PNC) as the new Prime Minister of Romania, although the PNC had won only 39 of the 387 seats on December 20.
- One month after the Italian Governor-General of Ethiopia had removed Abuna Qerellos IV from being the spiritual leader of the Ethiopian Orthodox Tewahedo Church, and directed Ethiopian clergymen to elect Abuna Abraham, the Holy Synod of the Coptic Orthodox Church met in Alexandria in Egypt. With the approval of the Holy Synod, Pope John XIX, declared the election invalid, and excommunicated Abraham.
- Born:
  - Ratan Tata, Indian businessman and billionaire who chaired the Tata Sons multinational corporation; in Bombay (now Mumbai) (d. 2024)
  - Bengt Ahlfors, Finland-born Swedish playwright and composer; in Helsinki.
- Died: Maurice Ravel, 62, French composer, pianist and conductor

== December 29, 1937 (Wednesday) ==
- The new Constitution of Ireland went into effect. The Irish Free State was abolished and the country was renamed, as Article 4 of the new Constitution stated simply "The name of the State is Éire, or, in the English language, Ireland. The designation of "Republic of Ireland" would not be made until 1949.
- A general strike by 120,000 public service workers began in France. The strike was settled after one day.
- Lou Thesz defeated Everett Marshall to win the vacant World Heavyweight Championship of the American Wrestling Association in a match in St. Louis., beginning a career where he would be the world champion of various organizations for a total of 10 years over more than 29 years, ending in 1968.
- Pierre Michelin, president of the Michelin tire company since 1933, was fatally injured in a car accident at Loiret département near Montargis, when he collided with a car driven by Louis Lagorgette, who was killed instantly, along his wife and son. Michelin died in a hospital the next day.
- Born:
  - Maumoon Abdul Gayoom, President of the Maldives from 1978 to 2008; in Malé, Maldives
  - Wayne Huizenga, American businessman and sports team owner who founded, the American trash collecting company Waste Management, Inc. (1968), the video rental company Blockbuster (1985), and the car retailer and rental company AutoNation (1996), and owned the Miami Dolphins NFL team, the Florida Panthers NHL team and the Miami Marlins MLB team; in Evergreen Park, Illinois (d.2018)
  - Dieter Thomas Heck (stage name for Carl-Dieter Heckscher), German television host of the ZDF program ZDF-Hitparade and actor in the West German film Das Millionspiel; in Flensburg(d. 2018)
  - Barbara Steele, English film actress; in Birkenhead, Cheshire

== December 30, 1937 (Thursday) ==
- King Farouk of Egypt dismissed the government of Prime Minister Mustafa el-Nahhas after the cabinet refused to appoint Aly Maher Pasha as chief of the royal cabinet. The King replaced Nahhas with Mohamed Mahmoud Pasha, along with and a cabinet that included several pro-Italian ministers. Rioting broke out in several districts of Cairo by demonstrators angry at the replacement.
- The Soviet Union's "Navy of the Red Army" was separated out as its own service of the Soviet Armed Forces, with only 24 warships (17 destroyers, 4 battleships and 3 battle cruisers) but 150 submarines.
- Tagalog was declared to be national language of the Philippines by Executive Order No. 134 from President Manuel Quezon.
- Born:
  - Gordon Banks, English footballer and goalkeeper with 73 caps for the England national team and 558 English League teams, primarily for Leicester City F.C. and Stoke City F.C. as well as being FIFA Goalkeeper of the Year six times; in Abbeydale, Sheffield (d. 2019)
  - John Hartford, American musician and songwriter, known for writing "Gentle on My Mind"; in New York City (d. 2001)
  - Jim Marshall, American NFL defensive end; in Wilsonville, Kentucky (d. 2025)
  - Paul Stookey, American singer and songwriter who was part of the group Peter, Paul and Mary; in Baltimore
  - Raquel Olmedo (stage name for Siomara Anicia Orama), Cuban-born Mexican singer and actress; in Caibarién
  - Boualem Rahal, 19, Algerian independence fighter noted for being executed by French Algerian authorities; in Algiers
- Died:
  - Alaksandar Ćvikievič, 49, who had served as the Soviet premier of the Byelorussian SSR (now the Republic of Belarus) from 1923 to 1925, was executed in Minsk, after having been accused of being a member of an organization called "the Union of Liberation of Belarus".
  - Frederick Nodder, 50, was hanged at Lincoln Prison for the January 5 murder of 10-year-old Mona Tinsley, after her body was discovered on June 6.
  - Hans Niels Andersen, 85, Danish shipping magnate and founder of the East Asiatic Company.

== December 31, 1937 (Friday) ==
- Octavian Goga addressed the Romanian people in a radio broadcast in which he outlined a series of antisemitic measures he intended to introduce against the country's Jews, whom he accused of having "exploited" Romania after entering "illegally" after the war.
- Born:
  - Avram Hershko, Hungarian-born Israeli biochemist and Nobel laureate; in Karcag
  - Sir Anthony Hopkins, actor; in Port Talbot, Wales
