= Kobozev =

Kobozev (Russian: Ко́бозев) is a Russian last name, a corruption of Kobuzev (Russian: Ко́бузев) from Kobuz (Kobus), a male personal name in the ancient Rus and Poland (from Proto-Slavic kobuz - 'hawk'):

- Eduard Kobozev (born 1979), Russian football player.
- Mikhail Ivanovich Kobozev (Michael Blagievsky, 1874–1937), Russian saint, new martyr.
- Nikolay Ivanovich Kobozev (1903–1974), Soviet physico-chemist
- Nikolay Stepanovich Kobozev (1793–1866), founder of Berdyansk, Ukraine
- Pyotr Alekseyevich Kobozev (1878–1941), Russian revolutionary
- Sergei Kobozev (1964–1995), Russian boxer
- Yevgeni Kobozev (born 1990), Russian football player.
- Yuri Nikolayevich Bogdanovich (alias Kobozev), Russian revolutionary, one of the organizer of Alexander II's assacination
