= Evans-Tibbs House =

Historic house in Washington, D.C., United States

- U.S. National Register of Historic Places
- U.S. Historic district – Contributing property
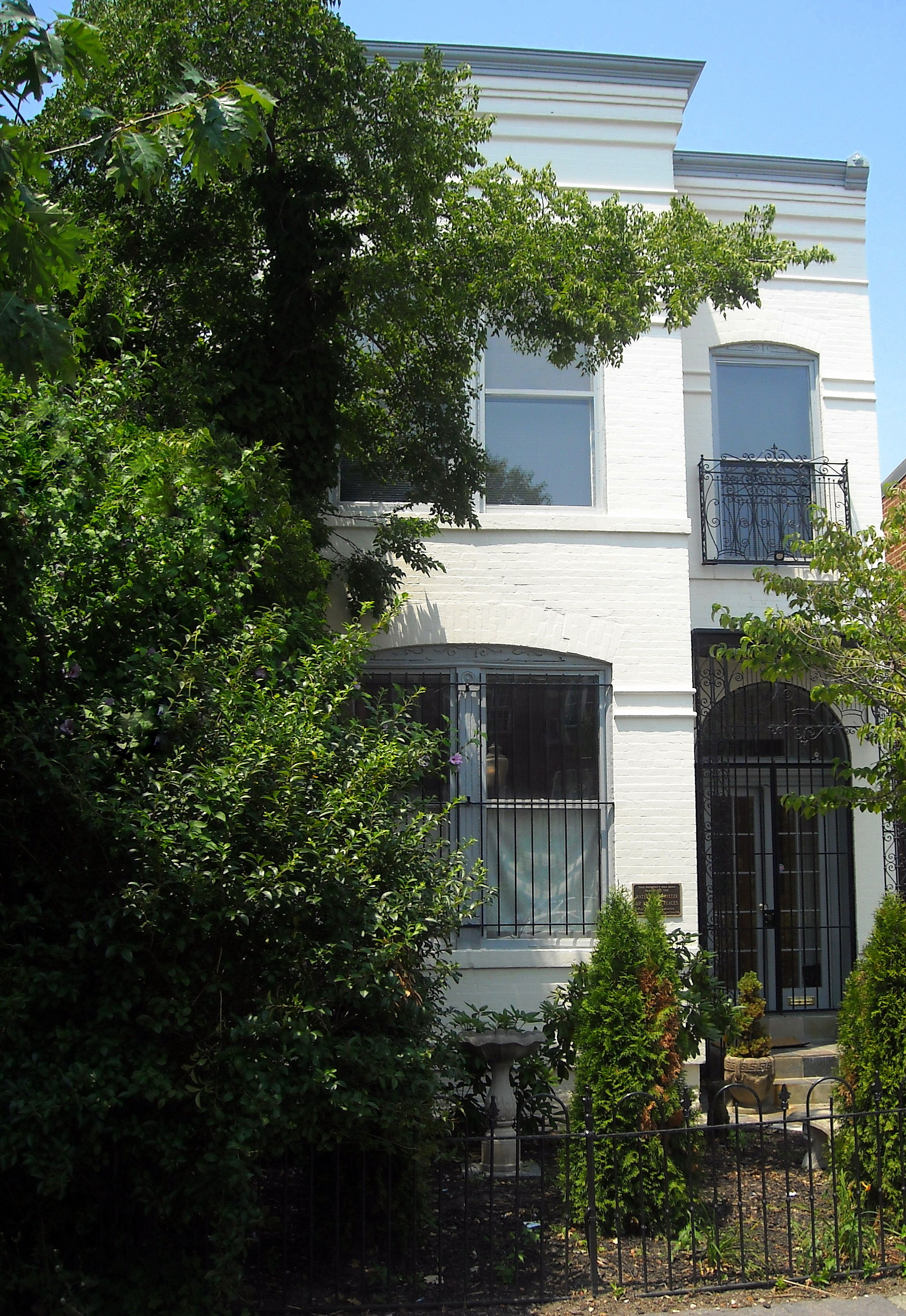

- Location within Washington, D.C. Location within the United States
- Location: 1910 Vermont Ave., NW; Washington, D.C.
- Coordinates: 38°54′57″N 77°1′35″W
- Built: 1894
- Architect: R.E. Crump
- Architectural style: Late Victorian
- Part of: Greater U Street Historic District (ID93001129)
- NRHP reference No.: 86003025
- Added to NRHP: September 8, 1987

The Evans-Tibbs House is an historic house in the Shaw neighborhood of Washington, D.C. It has been listed on the District of Columbia Inventory of Historic Sites since 1985 and it was listed on the National Register of Historic Places in 1987. It is a contributing property in the Greater U Street Historic District.

== Lillian Evans Tibbs ==
The house was the residence of Lillian Evans Tibbs from 1904 to 1967. Performing under the stage name Madame Lillian Evanti, she was one of the first internationally acclaimed African American opera singers. She was also the first African American to perform with an organized European opera company and she performed for Eleanor Roosevelt at the White House. Tibbs served as a Goodwill Ambassador to South America, and in 1942 she helped establish the National Negro Opera Company.

After Tibbs' death her grandson, Thurlow Evans Tibbs, Jr. lived in the house. He established and operated an art gallery called the Evans-Tibbs Collection. Upon his death in 1997 the art collection was bequeathed to the Corcoran Gallery of Art; at that institution's dismantling in 2014, the Tibbs collection of art and archives went to the National Gallery of Art.

== Architecture ==
The structure is a two-story brick rowhouse designed by architect R.E. Crump. It was built in 1894; the decorative iron railings with stylized harps were added to the house in a 1932 renovation.
