= William Franklin (singer) =

American opera singer

Background information
- Born: 1906; Shaw, Tennessee, U.S.
- Origin: Chicago, Illinois, U.S.
- Occupation: Opera singer

William Franklin (born 1906, date of death unknown) was a baritone opera singer who was considered to be a pioneering African American in the Chicago music scene. He has been described as the best baritone of his day, with some performances that "will long be remembered for [their] intensity of musical feeling." He was known for his leading roles in a revival of George Gershwin's Porgy and Bess in 1944, and in Gilbert and Sullivan's The Mikado.

== Biography ==
Franklin was born in a farm near Shaw, Tennessee, and raised in Chicago, Illinois. He went to the Wendell Phillips High School, where he was trained by Mildred Bryant-Jones, and played in various bands. He took up trombone and singing in jazz groups after completing high school. From 1925 to 1935, Franklin played with some of the great jazz names of the time, such as Clarence Jones, Dave Peyton, Stanley "Fess" Williams and Earl "Fatha" Hines.

After a traffic accident, he focused on singing and enrolled at the Chicago Conservatory of Music. He made his operatic debut as Amonastro in a 1937 production of Verdi's Aida at the Chicago Civic Opera, with La Julia Rhea. This role paved the way for many other opera and musical appearances. He often played with Mary Caldwell Dawson's National Negro Opera Company, and in the operetta performances of Gilbert and Sullivan works.
