= Mary Cardwell Dawson =

American opera singer

- Born: Mary Lucinda Cardwell; February 14, 1894; Madison, North Carolina, US
- Died: 1962 (aged 67–68); Washington, D.C., U.S.
- Education: New England Conservatory of Music; Chicago Musical College
- Occupations: Opera director, educator
- Spouse: Walter Dawson (m. 1927)

Mary Lucinda Cardwell Dawson (1894–1962) was an American opera singer and voice teacher. She was the founding director of the National Negro Opera Company (NNOC). In 1961, Dawson was appointed to the National Music Committee by President John F. Kennedy.

== Early life and education ==
Mary Lucinda Cardwell Dawson was born on February 14, 1894 in Madison, North Carolina to James Abraham "J.A." Cardwell and Elizabeth Webster Cardwell. She is the third of six children and spent the majority of her childhood and adolescence in Homestead, Pennsylvania which is a suburb of Pittsburgh.

Growing up in Homestead, Mary Lucinda attended Homestead Grammar School and was surrounded by music. She participated in the music ministry at her home church Park Place A.M.E. Church (formerly known as Gladden A.M.E. Church). And engaged in various musical endeavors around the Pittsburgh Area. by 1914, she began to teach music and voice lessons.

In 1920, Cardwell left home for Boston, Massachusetts where she studied music at the New England Conservatory of Music in Boston and Central Evening High School. She earned her high school diploma on April 11, 1924 and graduated from New England Conservatory of Music on June 23, 1925 with a teacher's diploma. She continued her studies at the Chicago Musical College and The Metropolitan Opera Studios in New York City.

== Cardwell School of Music ==
After graduating, Mary Lucinda Cardwell came back to Homestead and in 1925 she started the Cardwell School of Music at 6356 Frankstown Avenue in the East Liberty Neighborhood of Pittsburgh. The school was a success, routinely accumulated new staff, and moved twice; firstly to 6295 Frankstown Avenue in East Liberty and then, in 1933, to 7101 Apple St. in the Homewood neighborhood of Pittsburgh. This endeavor also yielded the Cardwell Dawson Choir.

== Marriage ==
In 1927, Madame Dawson married Walter Dawson, a master electrician.

== National Negro Opera Company ==
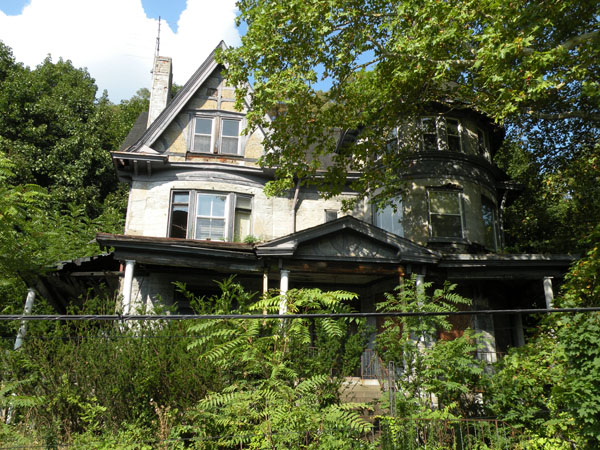
Mary Cardwell Dawson's House at 7101 Apple Street in the Homewood West neighborhood of Pittsburgh, Pennsylvania. This was the original home of the National Negro Opera Company.

After presenting the opera Aida at the National Association of Negro Musicians convention of 1941, Dawson launched her National Negro Opera Company (NNOC) later that same year with a performance at Pittsburgh's Syria Mosque. The star was La Julia Rhea, and other members included Minto Cato, Carol Brice, Robert McFerrin, and Lillian Evanti. NNOC mounted productions in Washington D.C., New York City, Chicago, and Pittsburgh.

Dawson was devoted to bringing opera to African American audiences. She organized opera guilds in Baltimore, Chicago, Cleveland, Detroit, Washington, D.C., Newark, and New York. She trained hundreds of African American youth to sing opera.

In 1961, Dawson was appointed to the National Music Committee by President John F. Kennedy.

== Death ==
Dawson died in 1962 in Washington, D.C. of a heart attack.

== The Passion of Mary Cardwell Dawson ==
The Passion of Mary Cardwell Dawson is a play that was commissioned and premiered at the Glimmerglass Festival in Cooperstown, New York in 2021. The play and text for music were written by Sandra Seaton with original music by Carlos Simon. The play tells the story of her founding of the National Negro Opera Company. Total run time is 70 minutes.

Cast and artistic team of premiere

Principals
Madame Mary Cardwell Dawson	Denyce Graves
Isabelle	Victoria Lawal
Phoebe	Mia Athey
Frank	Jonathan Pierce Rhodes
Music staff
Music director/pianist/principal coach	Kevin Miller
Production personnel
Director	Kimille Howard
Set designer	Peter Davison
Costume designer	Jessica Jahn
Lighting designer	Amith Chandrashaker
Sound designer	Andrew Harper
Hair and makeup designer	Cassie Williams
Production stage manager	Dustin Z West
Supertitles	Kelley Rourke
Assistant director	Ian Silverman
Assistant stage manager	Kayla Uribe
