= Valentin Kuptsov =

Russian politician (born 1937)

- Валентин Купцов
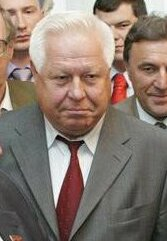
- Kuptsov in 2007

First Secretary of the Communist Party of the Russian SFSR
- In office 6 August 1991 – 14 February 1993
- Preceded by: Ivan Polozkov
- Succeeded by: Position abolished

Personal details
- Born: 4 December 1937 (age 88) Mindyukino, Cherepovetsky District, Vologda Oblast, RSFSR, Soviet Union
- Education: Leningrad Higher Party School

Valentin Aleksandrovich Kuptsov (Russian: Валентин Александрович Купцов; 4 December 1937) is a Russian statesman and politician. He was Secretary of the Central Committee of the CPSU (1990–1991), First Secretary of the Central Committee of the Communist Party of the RSFSR (August–November 1991; de facto until February 1993), Vice-Chairman from February 1993 and from 20 March 1993 to 3 July 2004, First Vice-Chairman of the Communist Party Central Committee, member of the Presidium of the Central Committee of the Communist Party in 1993–2008. Deputy of the State Duma of the Federal Assembly of the Russian Federation, 2nd–5th convocations (1995–2011), Vice-Chairman of the State Duma of the Federal Assembly of the Russian Federation, 4th convocation (2003–2007).

== Biography ==
=== Soviet period ===
Valentin Kuptsov was born on 4 December 1937, in the village of Mindyukino, Cherepovetsky District, Vologda Oblast. He began working in 1955 on a collective farm, then managed a reading room in a cottage in the Ulomsky District of Vologda Oblast.

From 1956 to 1958, he served in the army. From 1958 he worked at a metallurgical plant in Cherepovets. Simultaneously, he studied at the Northwestern Correspondence Polytechnic Institute, graduating in 1966 with a degree in metallurgical engineering. In 1988, he graduated from the Leningrad Higher Party School. At the Cherepovets Metallurgical Plant, he worked as a rolling mill operator, rolling mill foreman, secretary of the workshop party committee, and deputy secretary of the plant party committee.

He was a member of the CPSU from 1966. From 1974, he was a party member. From 1974 to 1979, he served as First Secretary of the Cherepovets Municipal Committee of the CPSU.

As Kuptsov himself recalled, he was "offered to Moscow three times," the first time in 1974, while still working at the plant, then in 1975, "when I was working as second secretary of the city committee in Cherepovets, they took me to the heavy industry department of the party's Central Committee." Kuptsov refused to be interviewed by Central Committee Secretary Vladimir Dolgikh. "The last instance was in 1985. They took me to Moscow as an inspector... this was the third instance, and it was impossible for me to refuse. I went through this process and was recommended as second secretary of the Central Committee of the Communist Party of Uzbekistan. And then, suddenly, the Politburo decided to release Anatoly Drygin... So they took me back to Vologda Oblast.”

From 1985 to 1989, he served as First Secretary of the Vologda Regional Committee of the CPSU. From 1986 to 1991, he was a member of the Central Committee of the Communist Party of the Soviet Union.

In the spring of 1989, he was elected a People's Deputy of the USSR. Velikoustyug territorial constituency of the Vologda Oblast.

1989–1990 — Member of the Russian Bureau of the Central Committee of the CPSU.

In 1990, he was elected a People's Deputy to the Vologda Regional Council of People's Deputies.

March–April 1990 — President of the Vologda Regional Council.

In April 1990, he was transferred to party work in Moscow: he served as Secretary of the Central Committee of the Communist Party of the Soviet Union, head of the Department for Social and Political Organizations of the Central Committee of the CPSU, and Chairman of the Standing Social and Political Commission of the CPSU Central Committee.

He participated in the founding of the Communist Party of the Russian Soviet Federative Socialist Republic. At the Plenum of the Central Committee of the Communist Party of the RSFSR on August 6, 1991, he was elected First Secretary of the Central Committee of the Communist Party of the RSFSR (replacing Ivan Polozkov).
