= Communist Party of the Russian SFSR =

The Communist Party of the Russian SFSR may refer to:

- A name associated with the Communist Party of the Soviet Union which was known as Russian Social Democratic Labour Party (Bolsheviks) (1912–1918) and Russian Communist Party (Bolsheviks) (1918–1925)
- Communist Party of the Russian Soviet Federative Socialist Republic (Russian SFSR) or Communist Party of the Russian SFSR established in 1990 as a Russian republican branch of Communist Party of the Soviet Union
