= Ron Taylor =

Ron Taylor may refer to:

- Ron Taylor (actor) (1952–2002), American actor
- Ron Taylor (baseball) (1937–2025), Canadian physician and earlier a professional baseball player
- Ron Taylor (diver) (1934–2012), Australian underwater diver, shark expert and film maker
- Ron Taylor (footballer) (1932–2015), VFL footballer and Olympic boxer
- Ron Taylor (singer), American singer
- Ron Taylor (rugby league) (1932–2023), Australian rugby league footballer
- Tiny Ron Taylor (1947–2019), American film actor and basketball player
- Ron Taylor (American football) (c. 1940–2014), American football coach and player
- Ron Taylor (bowls), Australian bowls international
- Ron Taylor (comedian), American comedian, actor and writer
- Ron Taylor (politician) (born 1964), American politician, member of the Idaho Senate
