= Wang Zihui =

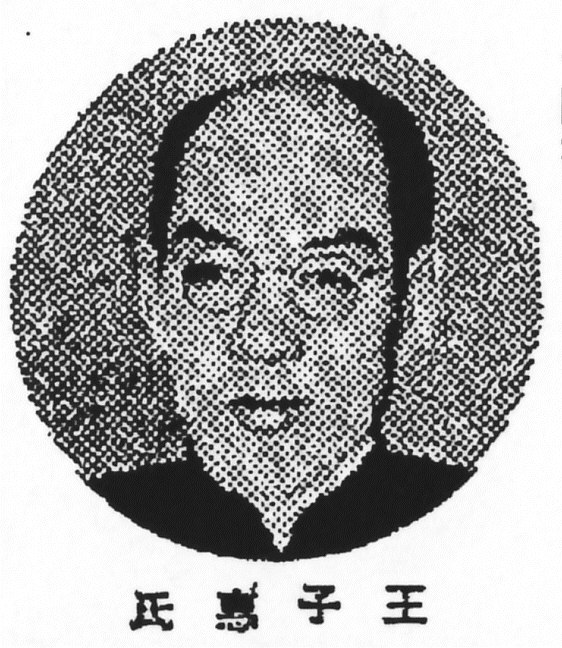
Wang Zihui

Wang Zihui (Chinese: 王子惠; pinyin: Wáng Zǐhuì; Wade–Giles: Wang Tsu-hui) (1892 - after 1957) was a politician, military officer, Japanese collaborator and journalist in the Republic of China. He was an important figure in the Reformed Government of the Republic of China. He was born in Xiamen.

== Biography ==
Wang Zihui went to Japan where he graduated from the Department of Law of Waseda University. After returning to China, he became a journalist. He successively held the positions Chief of the Office to Shanghai for the 2nd Army of Guominjun, Vice-Commander and Chief of the Political Bureau of the 20th Army of National Revolutionary Army, General Councilor of the National Government. He was a member of the China-Japan Economical Society.

In March 1938 Liang Hongzhi established the Reformed Government of the Republic of China which Wang Zihui participated in. He was appointed Minister for Business, but next June he suddenly resigned his post. Wang had already contacted H. H. Kung, Wang's resign was also suggested by Kung.

Later Wang Zihui worked for peace between China and Japan, in all likelihood at H. H. Kung's order. According to Kung's close adviser Jia Cunde(賈存德)'s memories, Wang had been good terms with General Shunroku Hata. And from April 1940 he contacted Lieutenant General Seishirō Itagaki.

In 1949 Wang Zihui went to Japan as the representative of the Republic of China. Next spring he retired from political circles and lived in Japan. On October 31, 1957, on charges of swindling, he was arrested by Japanese authorities. At the time, he made the false claim that he was Chiang Kai-shek's personal envoy.

Wang Zihui's life and whereabouts after this incident are unknown.

== Alma mater ==
Waseda University

== Footnotes ==
- Jia Cunde (賈存德) (1980). A Piece of Memory about the Connection between H. H. Kung and Japanese Bandit (孔祥熙與日寇勾結活動的片斷). Chinese Literature and History Press. from the Special Edition of Literary & Historical Materials Vol.29 (文史资料选辑 第29辑)
