= Nikolay Kobozev (scientist) =

Russian chemist (1903–1974)

Nikolay Ivanovich Kobozev
- Никола́й Ива́нович Ко́бозев
- Born: Nikolay Ivanovich Kobozev; 12 May 1903; Moscow, Russian Empire
- Died: 24 February 1974 (aged 70); Moscow, Soviet Union
- Education: Moscow State University
- Known for: Electrocatalysis
- Spouse: Esther (Ekaterina) Halbreich
- Children: 1
- Scientific career
- Fields: Physical chemistry
- Workplaces: Moscow State University
- Doctoral advisor: Evgeny Shpitalsky
- Other academic advisors: Nikolay Zelinsky

Nikolay Ivanovich Kobozev (Russian: Никола́й Ива́нович Ко́бозев; May 12, 1903, Moscow – February 24, 1974, Moscow) was a Soviet physico-chemist, one of the pioneers of electrocatalysis, founder of the Department of Catalysis and Gas Electrochemistry at Moscow State University.

== Background and personal life ==
Kobozev was born in a wealthy family of a Kharkov lawyer. His father, Ivan Josefovich Kobozev (1874, Kharkov – 1943, Moscow) graduated from Kharkov Imperial University. His mother, Sophia Adolfovna Feist (d. 1952) was a granddaughter of the German-born Taganrog watchmaker Franz Feist (1805–1888). Her family was Lutheran. Her father, Adolf Feist, was first a teacher of German; in 1891 he became a member of the board of Kharkov Land Bank. His mother's aunt, Maria Feist, was a sweetheart of Alexander Chekhov.

Nikolay's grandfather, Josef Alekseevich Kobozev (1846, Belgorod – July 18, 1901, Kharkov) moved to Kharkov in the 1860s where he got engaged in textile and flour trade. In 1889 he became a board member of the Second Kharkov Society of Mutual Credit. In 1892 he was elected to the Kharkov city duma.

According to independent researcher Igor Maslenkov, Kobozev's earliest ancestor was a serf peasant of a Belgorod boyar scion Artyom Pischyulin, settled at the village of Melehovo. His grandson, Dmitry Kosmin syn Kobyzev (1697–1752) became a merchant in Belgorod. His wife, Agrafena Fedotovna Maslova (1689–1770) was the daughter of a local poor nobleman. Their son, Stepan, was a merchant too; he was married to the daughter of another Belgorod merchant, Stephanida Rodionovna Dubinina. Stepan's brother, Ivan Dmitrievich Kobozev, was the salt head in Belgorod since 1778. Yakov Stepanovich Kobozev was a Belgorod merchant and ratman. The latter's son, Nikolay Yakovlevich (1781–1834), was a merchant too, but his son, Aleksey Nikolayevich (1804–?) left the merchant guild for the status of an ordinary burger in 1858.

In 1903 his father moved to Moscow, where he worked as a lawyer (prisjazhny poverenny) at the Administration of Moscow Vindavo-Rybinsk Railroad. After the October Revolution of 1917, he served as a lawyer at the Ministry of Transport.

Nikolay's brother, Vsevolod (1905–1939), was an engineer at the Soviet Ministry of Transport, the head of the electrification department. He was married to the daughter of Vissarion Karandeev, the professor of Moscow higher women's courses. For successful electrification of the Yaroslavl railways Stalin granted him with a golden watch. But in 1937 he was arrested and, in 1939, executed by shooting.

His other brother, Boris was a musician; he died in 1918 from Spanish flu. He also had a sister named Inna, who was seriously ill for most of her life.

Kobozev was married to Esther (Ekaterina in Russian Orthodoxy) Efimovna Halbreich of Jewish background. In 1946 they had a son named Aleksey (1946–2015), who had a daughter. His brother's lineage is continued in the male line.

Since early childhood, Kobozev was ill with poliomielitis. Since the 1920s, he had had a number of serious diseases, including complications of the polio. At some point in his life, he was wheelchaired and had to meet with his students at home. He had long periods of staying at hospitals or was down in bed recovering. In 1973 he was completely bed-bound. His wife had stayed loyal and supportive throughout his life.

== Scientific accomplishments ==
In 1924 Kobozev graduated from the Physics and Mathematics Department of Moscow State University (MSU). The same year he entered the post-graduate studies at the Scientific Research Institute of Chemistry under mentorship of professor Evgeny Shpitalsky. Since 1929 he was a lecturer at the Physical Chemistry Department of MSU. In 1935 he started to organize the laboratory of inorganic catalysis at Moscow State University. The same year he received the doctoral degree in chemical studies, the rank of professor and became an active member of MSU's Institute of Chemistry, without dissertation defense. Between 1925 and 1935 he promoted advanced scientific ideas at conferences, organized a special catalysis workshop at MSU's Physical Chemistry Department, and a catalysis sector at the State Institute of Nitrogen, attracting many students.

=== Theories ===
==== Catalysis ====
Kobozev's main focus was on catalysis and thermodynamics. The main problem in catalysis development has been the lack of a single generalized theory. Kobozev believed that the catalysis theories of his time were incapable of producing a common mechanism because they failed to explain the nature and structure of the active centers. He saw the main issue of the contemporary catalysis theories in the concept of crystalline nature of catalytic activity. In 1934 he introduced the term electrocatalysis.

In 1939, connecting the kinetic analysis method with the heterogenous catalysis, he introduced the theory of active ensembles which regarded how many atoms of metal catalyst can produce a catalytically active center.

In his research he had estimated the minimal number of catalytically active atoms in aggregates for some chemical reactions. He argued that the active centers were factored by energy rather than crystalline structures.

He called the minimal group of atoms showing catalytic activity active ensemble. However, he believed that the motion of such active ensembles was limited by special migration areas. Kobozev showcased how the number of atoms in an active ensemble and the average rate of a migration area could be determined by a change in specific activity I on the spread of a catalyst over the surface of a carrier. His study had revealed a connection between the typical heterogenous catalysis and the activity of complex enzymatic catalysts. In 1936 together with A. M. Dubrovskaya, Kobozev demonstrated that regular promoters on the surface of a catalyst are in larger concentration, than inside the phase, while in some cases promoter's presence on the surface brings about decline in catalytic activity.

It had been discovered that in heterogenous catalysis a solid body engages in the reaction not by the entire surface but by a small part of some active surface elements acting in the background of the large inactive crystalline mass of a catalyst. Kobozev had noticed that for some catalysts active surface was only 0.05%, therefore, he had supposed that such active centers were not crystalline but small groups of random atoms. Consequently, he had concluded that catalytic activity takes place not in the crystalline, but the amorphous, precrystalline, phase.

He had also noticed that the crystalline phase was made of a cellular, or mosaic, structure – an aggregate made of closed cells ('migration areas') surrounded by energetic and geometrical barriers impermeable to atoms of the surface, thus remaining isolated. Getting into migration area, as if hollows, atoms gather at the bottom, i.e. in place of maximum adsorbsion potential, creating ensembles. So formed ensembles of atoms of a certain composition, are active centers on an inactive catalytic carrier Kobozev had studied dissolution of active substance on an inert carrier and found out that increased dissolution resulted in rise in catalytic activity, while minimum of active substance brought about formation of maximally active catalysts. Kobozev had also proposed a formula calculating the number of atoms engaged in active centers.

Kobozev's research showed that the most active ensembles consisted of 2 or 3 atoms, which corresponded with Balandin's theory.

Kobozev and his students argued that activation of catalyst particles for the reaction has two factors: adsorbsion, i.e. interaction of an ion or atom with particles of a catalyst, and formation of an active center, i.e. interaction of catalyst's particles, which can, however, play separately.

Catalyst's activity can be significantly increased by including larger and thermadynamically unstable masses, which he named aggravation (1946) when increase of catalyst's activity is factored by complication of its molecule (increase of molecular mass). So he and his co-workers tried to explain superactivity of enzymes in catalysis.

Kobozev's theory of active ensembles contradicted the contemporary works on the relationship between activity and dispersion in catalysis which argued that catalytic activity of a solid body was higher with rise in the level of dispersion.

Further research of the relationship between dispersion and catalytic activity showed that crystalline structures, indeed, had catalystic activity, and his theory hadn't been accepted. Kobozev's catalysts had been proved to be of little production potential, while crystalline catalysts used in industry were fully accepted for their high output.

Kobozev's theory is believed to be practically implemented only if the amount of metal catalyst is small and the object has a block shape.

Kobozev expressed the idea of recuperation of energy that, held by the group of atoms connected to the active center, can partly activate molecules of a new substrate contacting the catalyst.

Kobozev took part in developments by professor Shpitalsky regarding the theory of intermediate products in the homogenous catalysis. Based on catalytic and enzymatic degradation of hydrogen peroxide, Kobozev showcased how studying the results of kinetic research can reveal the chemical composition and physical properties of those intermediate products that had before been only vaguely assumed in literature.

==== Thermodynamics ====
Kobozev actively studied thermodynamics and etropy. He believed that neither cells or molecules, nor atoms could factor reasoning. In order to explain it, he introduced the concept of special particles called psychons. In 1948 he also introduced the concept of vector-brownian motion aimed at finding out what in the nerve system rules living being's behavior. His work on the vector-brownian motion is believed to be the predecessor of cybernetics.

Kobozev had a specific concept of time in regards to life and death relationship. He classified time into translational (time of collective development) and dispersional (time of personal development). He believed that human's reasoning is tightly connected to the current time, while death is a person's disconnection from the 'knot' (klubok) of the current time. In 1954 he developed the concept of advanced complex (operezhayuschiy kompleks) in chemical kinetics and worked on the problem of time in quantum mechanics.

Regarding reasoning, Kobozev believed it cannot be evolved from information, and it is given to a human with birth. He also believed that every ethnicity (race) has had its own symbolic means of communication expressed in language from creation rather than developed it during evolution.

He introduced the terms of negative entropy, which he thought was essential part of logic, and anti-entropy, which blocked systemic thinking.

==== Applied studies ====
In the 1930s, Institute of Nitric Industry at Moscow State University was founded, and Kobozev was invited there to be the head of the department of catalysis. His work was focused on nitrogen oxidation, methane electro-cracking to acetylene, methane explosion conversion, as well as ozone synthesis and synthesis of peroxide from hydrogen in discharge. Together with his co-workers, Kobozev had developed the methods of studying kinetic reaction and introduced the energy catalysis theory explaining the mechanism of activation in the reaction in discharge, as well as the mechanism of reaction activating additives, such as mercury vapor in methane electro-cracking or nitrogen in ozone synthesis. The laboratory had managed to synthesize nitric acid, nitroleum and nitric anhydride. Kobozev initiated the first in the Soviet Union synthesis of acetylene from natural methane. Kobozev suggested using electric discharge to obtain active gases in hydrogen plasma, products of water dissociation, etc. Under Kobozev's mentoring, there were carried out experiments that resulted in the first generation of 100% ozone. In 1960 he initiated the first all-Soviet conference dedicated to ozone.

In 1947 he founded the Laboratory of Catalysis and Gas Electrochemistry aimed at secret research for the government. First, the laboratory was charged with tasks regarding rocket fuel, but later on professor Kobozev had managed to initiate fundamental research in catalysis, gas electrochemitry and thermodynamics. In 1950 the laboratory head and his staff were awarded with the state prize.

In total, Kobozev was the author of 12 concepts. Kobozev had published about 400 academic works. Out of his students, 12 received the doctoral degree.

== Criticism and support ==
For being a somewhat unconventional scientist he was severely criticized by some of his colleagues. In 1950, the Soviet chemist V. Goldansky published an article entitled "Pseudoscience of professor N. I. Kobozev", in which Kobozev's studies were called 'quasi-science', while he was compared with physical idealists. The author of the publication expressed concern that Kobozev's concepts could have negative impact on his students and colleagues averting them from 'real science'.

Amongst opponents of Kobozev was the electrochemist and academician Alexander Frumkin. The polemic between the two reflected the political and scientific schism between the Soviet academic scientists focused on inventing the nuclear bomb and the Moscow university scientists. Their conflict was summed up by attempts to prove the other wrong on fundamental points. However, it was A. Frumkin who suggested that Kobozev would get employed with the Karpov Institute of Physical Chemistry and abandon the Moscow University, which Kobozev declined.

In 1938 old and famed Russian scientists N. D. Zelinsky and N. S. Kurnakov recommended the 34-year-old Kobozev for the full membership in the Soviet Academy of Sciences, but he was rejected. There had been four or five attempts. According to Kobozev's wife, either Frumkin or Nesmeyanov said that since Kobozev was ill he wouldn't attend the meetings and his candidacy was never considered again.

In 1946 N. D. Zelinsky so said about Kobozev, "Soviet science can be proud of Kobozev's work ... as a great success. I personally recommend works of professor N. I. Kobozev for the Stalin prize in chemistry and believe that they deserve such a high award." Kobozev rejected the initiative himself; in his letter from March 23, 1954, he explained why his candidacy for the Stalin prize should be declined by that he had not submitted academic writings for 1953 and did not go through the assessment at the Academic Board of the Moscow University.

Kobozev had found himself in conflict with the famous physicist Lev Landau. At one of the conferences, Landau severely criticized the presentation of V.K. Semenchenko. Later Kobozev declared that he wouldn't give the speech if Landau failed to apologize. Landau followed Kobozev's demand, but the latter had since faced strong opposition from the Soviet society of physicists, which negatively affected his academic career.

== Kobozev and Solzhenitsyn ==
Alexander Solzhenitsyn met Kobozev in August 1960 through Natalia Reshetovskaya, former post-graduate student of Kobozev and the first wife of A. Solzhenitsyn. Reshetovskaya brought Solzhenitsyn's manuscript (later entitled "One day of Ivan Denisovich") to her former professor. Kobozev had developed much interest in Solzhenitsyn's ideas and asked his wife for an introduction. The family of Kobozev's executed brother kept all Solzhenitsyn's primary manuscripts between 1962 and 1969.

Due to Kobozev's severe health conditions, they met only at his apartment almost every evening until his death. Solzhenitsyn confessed in his account that Kobozev had had enormous impact on his views and "was the smartest man he had ever met". Solzhenitsyn made multiple attempts to help the professor with his health, including finding doctors and foreign medicines, but nothing ever helped.

In Solzhenitsyn's English-language memoir Invisible Allies, a profile of Kobozev and their friendship comprises Chapter 2.

== Bibliography ==
- Kobozev N. I. Studying thermodynamics of information and reasoning. Moscow State University, 1971.[Russian]
- Kobozev N. I. The Problems of Order and Disorder in Chemical Thermadynamics, 1961.[Russian]
- Kobozev N. I. On physico-chemical modeling of information and reasoning processes//the Journal of Physical Chemistry. # 2, 1996.[Russian]
- Kobozev N. I. Thinking paradox, 1971.[Russian]
- Kobozev N. I., Zubovich I.A. Problem of microdoses in chemistry and biology (growth substances as activators of catalytic systems//Biokhimiya, December, 1951.[Russian]
- Filipov Yu. V., Kobozev N.I. Electrical synthesis of ozone. Effect of electrode temperature on the formation of ozone//Russkij Zhurnal Phisiko-khimiji. #35, 1961.[Russian]
- Kobozev N. I. Catalyst and enzyme. Problem of superactivity of organic substances// Moscow State University Digest (Uchennye zapiski MGU). Inorganic and physical chemistry. #174, 1955, pp. 125–153.[Russian]
- Kobozev N. I. Selected works in 2 volumes. Moscow State University, 1978.[Russian]
- Kobozev N.I. Adsorbsion catalysts and theory of active centers//Sovremennye problemy fizicheskoy chimii. Moscow State University, 1968. Volume 3, pp. 3–60.
- Vigdorovich V.I., Tsygankova L.E., Vigdorovich M.V. Using the theory of active ensembles to explain the logic of hydrogen diffusion through a membrane//Vestnik TGU (Tomsk State University), Volume 7, Issue 3, 2002. pp. 329–335.
- Frumkin AN, Jofa ZA. Bagotsky VS (1952) N.I. Kobozev: adsorption theory of overvoltage// Zhurnal Fizicheskoy Khimii. 26:1854–1870 [In Russian]
