= Ron Taylor (comedian) =

American comedian, actor and writer

Ron Taylor is an American stand-up comedian, writer, and actor known for winning the first season of the Netflix comedy competition series Funny AF with Kevin Hart.

== Early life and education ==
Taylor was born and raised in Detroit, United States. His interest in comedy began during his high school years after classmates and teammates recognized his sense of humor. Taylor later studied engineering, robotics, and advanced mathematics, which he has said influenced his analytical approach to writing comedy.

== Career ==
Taylor began performing stand-up comedy in clubs and festivals across the United States. In 2017, he performed at LOL Live, a comedy showcase associated with Kevin Hart. In 2018, he was selected as a “New Face” at the Just for Laughs festival in Montreal. He later appeared on television programs including Apollo Live and Laughs, and was chosen by Bill Burr to perform on the Comedy Central stand-up series The Ringers. Taylor has also worked as an actor and writer. He appeared in the FX comedy series Oh Jerome, No and the film Old Dads.

From 2015 to 2023, Taylor lived in a van while pursuing comedy full-time.

=== Avalanche ===
In April 2024, Taylor released his debut stand-up comedy special, Avalanche, through Comedy Dynamics. The special was directed by Jay Chapman with executive producer Jay Siegan and distributed on platforms including Apple TV and Amazon Prime Video.

=== Funny AF with Kevin Hart ===
In 2026, Taylor competed in the Netflix stand-up comedy competition series Funny AF with Kevin Hart. He advanced to the finals alongside comedians Usama Siddiquee, Caitlin Peluffo, and Reg Thomas. Taylor won the competition after a public vote, receiving a Netflix comedy special and an appearance at The Roast of Kevin Hart. He said he "planned for everything except winning."

== Comedy style and influences ==
Taylor has named comedians such as Bernie Mac, Patrice O'Neal, Chris Rock, Dave Chappelle, Louis C.K., Paul Mooney, and Richard Pryor as influences on his work.

== Filmography ==
Television and film appearances
Year	Title	Role	Notes
2017	The Ringers	Himself / Stand-up comedian	Comedy Central stand-up showcase; selected by Bill Burr.
2019	Oh Jerome, No		Appeared in the FX comedy series directed by Alex Karpovsky.
2023	Old Dads		Appeared in the comedy film directed by Bill Burr.
2026	Funny AF with Kevin Hart	Contestant / Winner	Winner of Season 1; prize included a Netflix comedy special and an appearance at The Roast of Kevin Hart.

== Discography ==
Comedy specials
Title	Year	Notes
Avalanche	2024	Debut stand-up comedy special released through Comedy Dynamics.
