= National Negro Opera Company =

African-American opera company

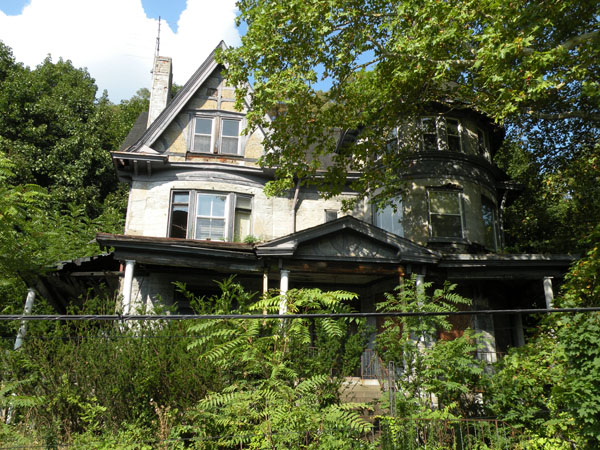
- The National Negro Opera Company House

- Location within Pittsburgh
- 40.4642°N 79.89571°W
- Location: 7101 Apple Street, Homewood West neighborhood of Pittsburgh, Pennsylvania

History
- Built: House: 1908; Company: 1941

Site notes
- Architectural style: Queen Anne style
- Governing body: Jonnet Solomon-Nowlin & Miriam White

The National Negro Opera Company (1941–1962) was established in Pittsburgh, Pennsylvania and became the most successful African-American opera company in the United States. Although often mistakenly called the first due to its enormous successes, other African-American opera companies (such as the Theodore Drury Opera Company) predate the NNOC.

== History ==
Organized in Pittsburgh, Pennsylvania, under the direction of Mary Cardwell Dawson, the company was launched with a performance at the local Syria Mosque. The star was La Julia Rhea, and other members included Minto Cato, Carol Brice, Robert McFerrin, and Lillian Evanti. During its 21-year run, NNOC also mounted productions in Washington D.C., New York City, and Chicago.

The company disbanded in 1962 upon Dawson's death.

Although the company toured nationally, its offices and studios were housed in a three-story Queen Anne-style house at 7101 Apple Street in Pittsburgh's Homewood neighborhood. Built as a private residence, it was purchased by William A. "Woogie" Harris (brother of the photographer Charles "Teenie" Harris) in the 1930s. The NNOC moved to Washington, D.C., in 1942, but the company continued to use the third floor as a local guild office and studios until the company disbanded.

After the Opera departed, the building transitioned into a social hub and boarding house known as Mystery Manor, often hosting visiting celebrities and athletes who were excluded from the local segregated hotels.

In 1994, the Pennsylvania Historical and Museum Commission designated the NNOC's house on Apple Street a historic structure; it became a Pittsburgh City Historic Landmark in 2008. In 2003 and again in 2013, the Young Preservationists of Pittsburgh included the building on their "Top 10" preservation opportunities.

Purchased in 2000 by Pittsburgh residents Jonnet Solomon and Miriam White, after years of plans to transform the historic building into a museum and arts center, it remains dilapidated.

In 2020, the National Trust for Historic Preservation added the building to its annual list of America’s 11 Most Endangered Historic Places.

Restoration work on the structure began in 2022, with a targeted completion date of 2024.
