= Alexei Voshchakin =

Soviet artist (1898–1937)

- Born: 1898; Dubovy Umyot, Samara Governorate, Russian Empire
- Died: 1937 (aged 38–39); Leningrad, RSFSR, Soviet Union

Alexei Vasilievich Voshchakin (1898–1937) was a Soviet artist who worked in Krasnoyarsk and Novosibirsk in the 1920s and 1930s.

== Biography ==
Alexei Voshchakin was born in 1898 in Dubovy Umyot, Samara Governorate. His father was a railroad worker. Since 1899, the future artist lived in Siberia.

From 1910 to 1913, he studied at the Krasnoyarsk Drawing School under Dmitri Karatanov and in 1913–1917 Voshchakin also attended Kazan Art School.

During the reign of Alexander Kolchak, he served in the public security squad.

In 1917 Voshchakin moved to Krasnoyarsk, where he worked as an instructor for the Yenisei Council of Cooperatives. In 1922–1925 he studied at Vkhutemas in Moscow. In 1925, he again worked in Krasnoyarsk in the Krasnoyarsky Rabochy newspaper and organized, together with Andrey Lekarenko a zincography shop.

In 1925, the painter moved to Novosobirsk and worked in local publishing houses. He was a founding member and chairman of the board of the "Novaya Sibir" Society of Artists (1926–1931), the initiator of the First Siberian Congress of Artists (1927) and the first chairman of the Novosibirsk branch of the Khudozhnik Cooperative Partnership (1931–1933). The artist wrote a number of articles on fine arts for the Siberian Soviet Encyclopedia. In the 1920s, Voshchakin worked at the Novosibirsk Museum of Local Lore.

On August 5, 1933, Voshchakin was sentenced by the OGPU to 10 years in labor camps and served his sentence in the Solovki prison. On November 25, 1937, the painter was sentenced to capital punishment and shot on December 8, 1937, in Leningrad. He was buried in the same city.

== Participation in art exhibitions ==
- Exhibition of works by Krasnoyarsk artists (1925)
- The first All-Siberian exhibition of painting, graphics, sculpture and architecture in Novosibirsk and Krasnoyarsk (1927)
- Exhibition of works by Krasnoyarsk artists (1928)
- The first West Siberian regional art exhibition in Novosibirsk (1933)

== Works ==
His works are kept in the Novosibirsk State Art Museum, the Novosibirsk State Museum of Local Lore and the Krasnoyarsk Art Museum named after V. I. Surikov.

=== Gallery ===
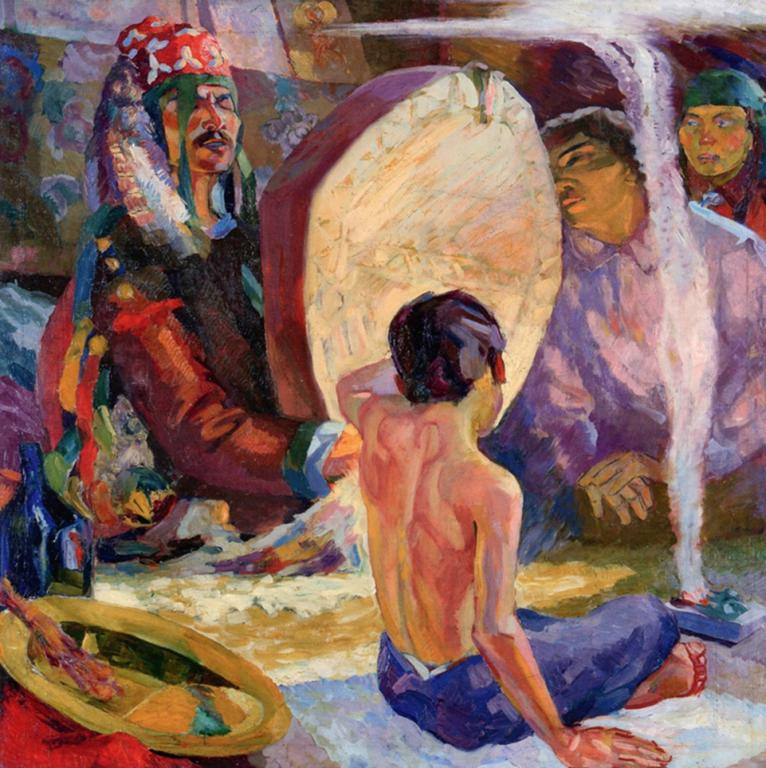
Shaman in a yurt, 1927

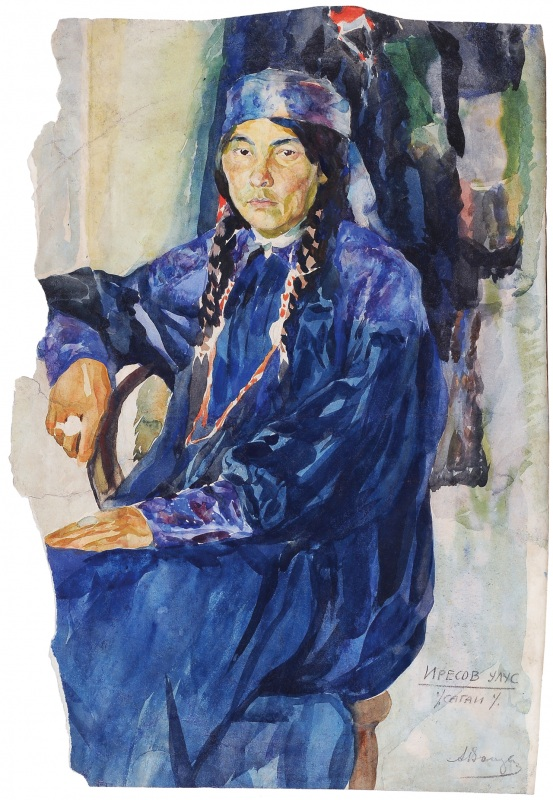
Khakassian woman from the Sagay tribe

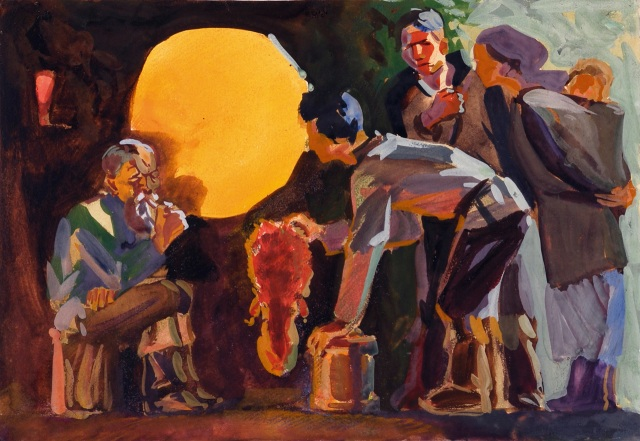
At the shaman's, 1933

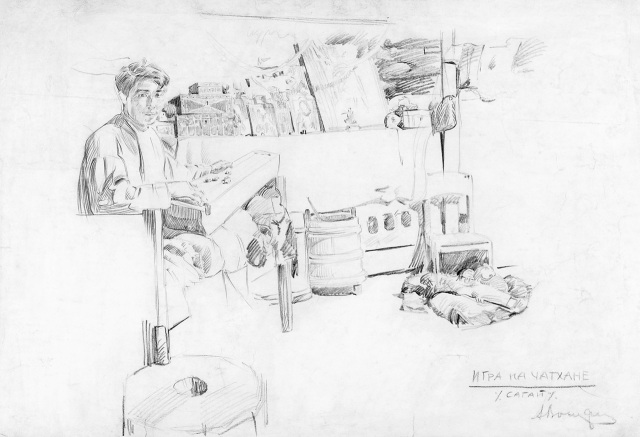
Chatkhan playing

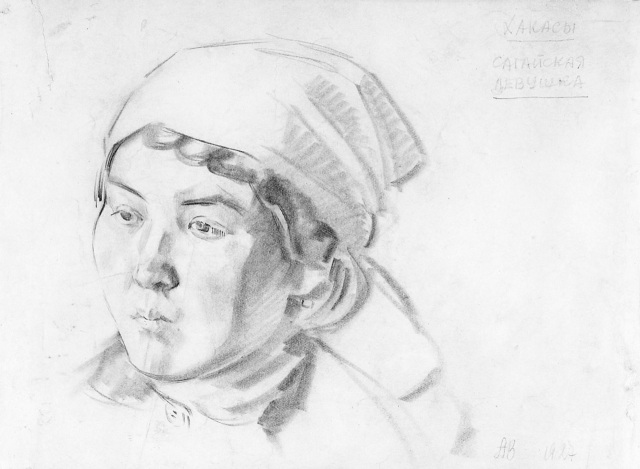
Sagay young woman
