= Lillian Evanti =

American opera singer

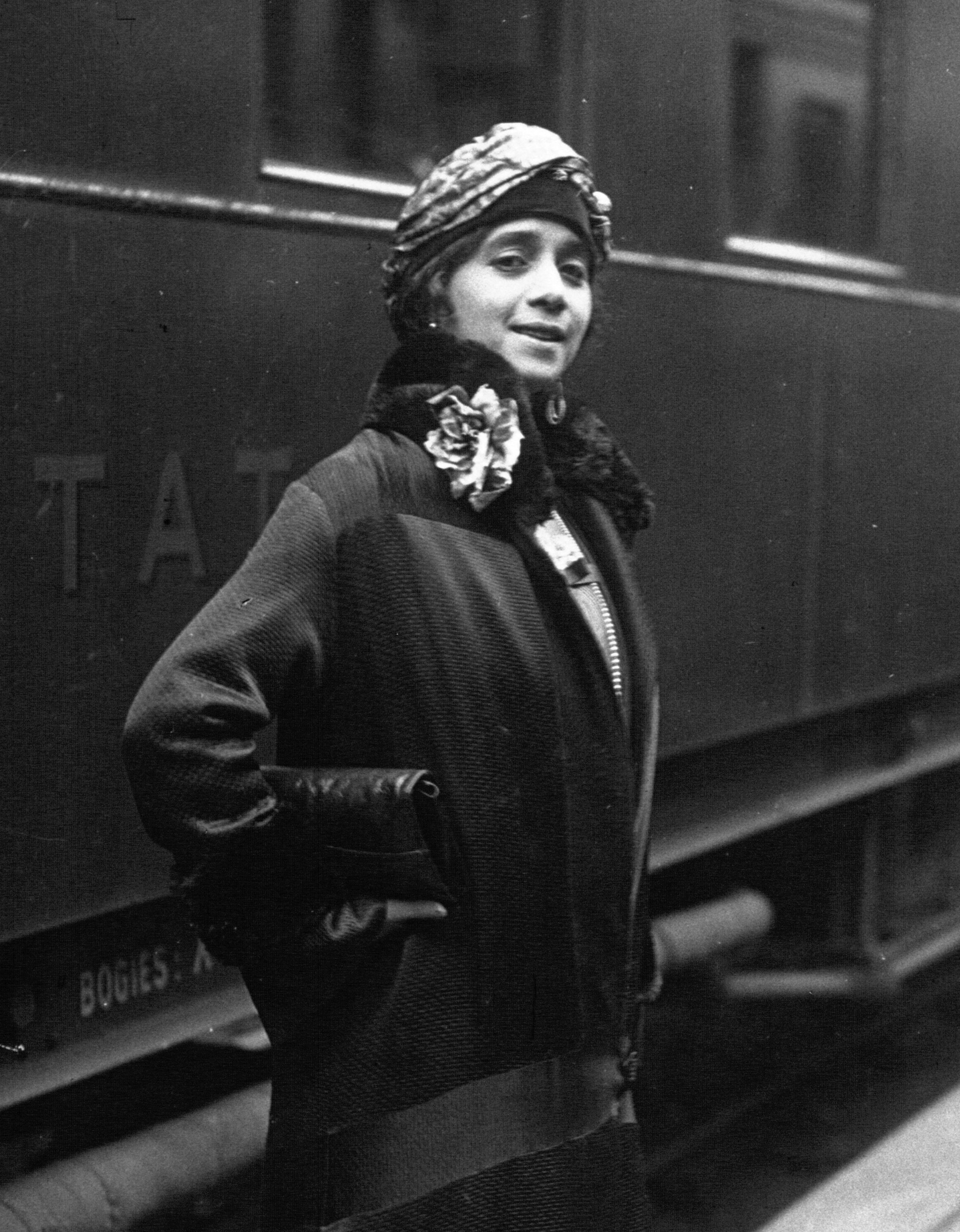
- Lillian Evanti in France in 1926

Background information
- Born: Annie Wilson Lillian Evans; August 12, 1890; Washington, D.C.
- Died: December 6, 1967 (aged 77)
- Occupation: Opera Singer
- Instrument: Soprano
- Years active: 1925–1945

Lillian Evanti (August 12, 1890 – December 6, 1967) was an American soprano, composer, and civil rights advocate who broke racial barriers in classical music. Excluded from opportunities in the racially segregated American opera scene, Evanti was the first African American to perform with a major European opera company, earning acclaim for her performances across France, Italy, and South America singing works by Delibes, Verdi, and Handel. Evanti was a prolific recitalist, an esteemed composer, and a trailblazer for Black artists in classical music, advocating for racial equality in the arts, performing for First Lady Eleanor Roosevelt at the White House, and marching alongside civil rights leaders in the 1963 March on Washington.

== Early life and education ==
Evanti was born in Washington, D.C., and graduated from Armstrong Manual Training School, where her father, W. Bruce Evans, was the first principal. Her paternal grandfather, Henry Evans, was born in North Carolina as a free black man and later moved to Oberlin, Ohio, where he helped with the Underground Railroad. Evanti's maternal grandfather, John H. Brooks, was elected to the House of Delegates in 1874 and defeated Frederick Douglas Jr. Although gifted in music, in 1908, Evanti entered Miner Teachers College (now University of the District of Columbia) for the education of black elementary school teachers. While there, Evanti met Georgia Douglas Johnson, a future poet and literary figure Evanti would later consult with in writing songs. Evanti graduated from Howard University with a bachelor's degree in music. At her commencement in May 1917, Evanti sang French, German, and English as well as American songs that brought her national attention by the black press, such as the New York Age (being a woman of color, Evanti was not discovered by white media for over a decade after this performance).

== Career ==
With the support from her husband, Evanti set sail for Paris in 1924 to begin her operatic journey. To sound more European, Evanti combined her maiden name "Evans" and her married name "Tibbs" to create her new stage name, Evanti. As an African American classical singer in America, she had little success outside of the black community. Evanti hoped that in France, she would finally find her voice. In Paris, Evanti studied voice with French soprano Gabrielle Ritter-Ciampi and, within the year, moved to Nice, where her instructor advised her to audition at the local opera houses. Evanti, a soprano, sang at the Belasco Theatre in 1926 with Marian Anderson. Evanti debuted in 1925 in Delibes's Lakmé at Nice, France. Although Evanti was receiving praise in Europe, only black newspapers were picking up her success in America. In an article by The Chicago Defender (national edition) on September 26, 1925, Evanti goes into detail about the unknown color prejudice she experienced in France after her debut. "Distinguished Parisians understand us," says Madame Evanti. "There is no such thing as color prejudice, especially among the upper classes." The article then goes into a story of her making her first public appearance in a joint recital with a violinist at the home of the distinguished Salmon family: "I feel that Mme. Salmon understands very thoroughly the race question in America. She has made a special study of it and is very much interested in the general progress of the Negro."

As Evanti's popularity grew, she sang opera at Toulon, Montpelier, and Monte Carlo, where, in 1926, she was a guest artist of the Monte-Carlo Philharmonic Orchestra. Finally, in 1927, Evanti was invited to sing in Paris. The Chicago Defender reviewed her singing the same role at the Trianon-Lyrique in Paris on Christmas Eve of 1927. "When the posters all over Paris announced that an American would interpret "Lakme" on Christmas Eve night, the theater-going public began to wonder. An American interpreting the leading role at the Trianon-Lyrique? That's one of the things which almost never happen. She was no longer an American singing in French, she was an artist of rare ability; she was all that Delibes himself could have desired in his heroine." During her time in Europe, Evanti would return home to Washington every summer and give concerts there. Along with spirituals, Evanti presented a broad repertoire, including works by Handel, Scarlatti, Bellini, and Rameau, which grabbed the attention of a few "white" papers. However, they neglected to identify her as a black singer.

As Evanti's reputation and demand grew, her marriage began to suffer. Her husband, Roy Tibbs, who was once enthusiastic about supporting her career, was now beginning to resent her success. In September 1925, while visiting her family, Evanti found that Roy had left their house and was ill. After nursing him back to health, Evanti returned to France only to come back again two years later to a cold and empty house. Evanti decided to sue Roy for separate maintenance. In an article by The New York Amsterdam News on August 22, 1927, "she sought to return to him and that he refused to see her, that when she went to see him, he left the house and that she and her son remained. Mrs. Tibbs stated that from 1924 to 1927, she did not receive more than $225 from her husband for her support and assistance maintenance. She says her husband after urging her to pursue her career has tried to make it appear that her ambition is the cause of their separation." The District of Columbia Court of Appeals granted Evanti's petition and ordered Roy Tibbs to pay monthly child support. After her divorce, Evanti continued to travel with her mother and son. Evanti toured throughout Europe and South America as an opera singer and concert artist.

In early 1932, Gatti-Casazza, the Metropolitan Opera Company general manager, invited her to audition at their house. Lillian left Europe at the height of her career to sing opera in her native country. Unfortunately, they refused to give her a contract. Evanti auditioned for them two more times, the last time in 1946 at the age of fifty-six. They never offered her a contract due to racial segregation. Nevertheless, Evanti continued to sing from 1932 to 1935 in the United States to praise and acclaim for the "tonal beauty of her voice", including a private recital at the White House for an audience of Eleanor Roosevelt and her friends.

In 1943, Evanti performed with the Watergate Theater barge on the Potomac River. In 1944, Evanti appeared at The Town Hall (New York City). Evanti received acclaim as Violetta in Verdi's La traviata as produced by the National Negro Opera Company in 1945. In an article by The Chicago Defender (National edition) on August 14, 1943 "Miss Evanti expressed a desire to see more of her race become interested in opera. She explained that "La Traviata" is offering her an opportunity to translate the role of Violetta in English, in order that a better understanding will be afforded those witnessing the performance."

Evanti continued to give concerts and recitals nationwide and, in the 1940s, began to spend more time composing. In 1942, Evanti visited notorious blues composer W.C Handy and thus began a musical relationship between composer and publisher. The Handy Brothers published Evanti's "The Mighty Rapture", "The Twenty-third Psalm", "Thank You Again and Again", "Speak to Him Thou", and "High Flight". Eventually, Evanti published her music as owner and founder of the Columbia Music Bureau in Washington.

In 1963, Evanti walked with her friend Alma Thomas in the March on Washington. Evanti was also a member of Zeta Phi Beta sorority.

In the post-World War II era, her life changed drastically when her husband, mother, and brother died within five years of each other. Her grief and the decline of professional demands gave Evanti a chance to grow closer with her son, his wife, and her two grandchildren. Although Evanti was no longer singing on grand opera stages, Evanti became involved in the music life within the D.C. community and brought her love and passion to the "Evanti Chorale". Evanti's prologue to her unpublished autobiography can be found at the Center for Black Music Research at Columbia College Chicago.

== Personal life ==
Evanti married Roy W. Tibbs, a former director of the Coleridge-Taylor Society, a Washington D. C. African-American chorus founded in honor of the composer Samuel Coleridge-Taylor. They lived at 1910 Vermont Avenue in the Shaw Neighborhood of Northwest, Washington, D.C., which is now known as the Evans-Tibbs House and is listed in the National Register of Historic Places. They had a grandson, Thurlow E. Tibbs, Jr, an art dealer, born in 1952.

== Sources ==
- Eileen Southern, The Music of Black Americans: A History. W. W. Norton & Company; 3rd edition. ISBN 0-393-97141-4
- Lillian Evans Tibbs Materials Collection, Center for Black Music Research, Columbia College Chicago
- Madame Lillian Evanti seated on train in Europe.
- Smith, Eric Ledell. "Lillian Evanti: Washington's African-American Diva". Washington History. 11 (Spring/Summer 1999): 24-43, accessed March 6, 2017.
