= Michael Blagievsky =

Saint Michael Blagievsky

New Hieromartyr
- Born: 4 February 1874; Spas-Leonovschina, Moscow Governorate
- Residence: Ranenburg
- Died: 23 December 1937; Ryazhsk
- Honored in: Eastern Orthodox Church
- Canonized: 16 July 2005 by Holy Synod of the Russian Orthodox Church
- Feast: 23 December

Michael Blagievsky (birth name: Michael Ioannovich Kobozev; Russian: Михаи́л Иоа́ннович Ко́бозев) (February 4, 1874, Spas-Leonovschina, Moscow Governorate – December 23, 1937, Ryazhsk, Ryazan Oblast) was a Russian archpriest executed by the Bolsheviks and canonized by the Russian Orthodox Church in 2005 as a new martyr.

== Biography ==
Michael Ioannovich Kobozev was born on 4 February 1874 in the village of Spas-Leonovschina, Egorievsky Uyezd, Moscow Governorate, to Ioann Lvovich Kobozev, the deacon of the Church of the Transfiguration and his mother. In 1892 he finished Skopin theological school with the qualifications to enter Ryazanian seminary. However, he went into teaching and worked as an intern tutor at the parochial school of the village of Dimovo, Skopin Uyezd. In 1894 he received a primary school teacher’s certificate and started work at the parochial school of the Murzinka village, Skopin Uyezd, Ryazan Governorate. In 1897 he got a certificate of a worship vocalist.

In 1898 he was ordained as a deacon and commissioned to the village of Blagie, Ranenburg Uyezd, Ryazan governorate. There he taught the Bible at the local parochial school.

In 1910 he was commissioned to the Church of the Ascension in Ranenburg. In 1913 he was appointed to teach the Bible at the Luchinskoe school. For his good teaching he was awarded with a silver medal. Soon after he was ordained as a priest. After the Revolution, in the building across the Church of the Ascension the Bolsheviks founded their office. Soon the church was closed down. In 1932 Fr. Kobozev was transferred to the village of Dmitrievsky Borovok, Novo-Derevensky district, and left the family in Ranenburg. In 1933 he was raised to the rank of protopope. In 1937 many priests of the district were arrested, with Fr. Kobozev being arrested on 26 October that year.

Michael Kobozev was accused of anti-Soviet counter-revolutionary activity. On 6 December 1937 Fr. Kobozev was sentenced to be executed by firing squad. He was executed on 23 December, 1937 at the prison of Ryazhsk. His actual burial place is unknown.

By the decision of the Presidium of the USSR Supreme Soviet, Michael Kobozev was exonerated on 6 January 1989.

== Canonization ==
Upon the initiative of the Ryazan Diocese, on July 16, 2005, Protopriest Michael Kobozev was canonized as a saint of the Russian Orthodox Church and added in the Synaxis of Russian new martyrs and confessors of the 20th century as Michael Blagievsky, after the name of the village where he once served.

In summer 2009, on the façade of the house where he lived in Ranenburg there was set a memorial plate.

His feast day is on 23 December, the day he was martyred.

== Family ==
His family avoided repressions. His elder son, Nikolay, as a teacher in the Red Army, had to be present during his father’s arrest. Due to emotional trauma he soon left the Red Army and often changed places of residence fearing repressions.

=== Siblings ===
1. Dmitry
2. Maria

=== Spouse ===
Sofia Nikolayevna (d. 1956)

=== Children ===
1. Nikolay (b. 1900, teacher, served in the Red Army)
2. Ivan (b. 1901, killed in action in the Battle of Stalingrad)
3. Vera (b. 1903, teacher)
4. Antonina (b. 1904, teacher)
5. Kapitalina (b. 1906)
6. Anna (b. 1910, nursery teacher)
7. Michael (b. 1915; a veteran of World War II, worked as a driver)
