= Minto Cato =

American opera singer

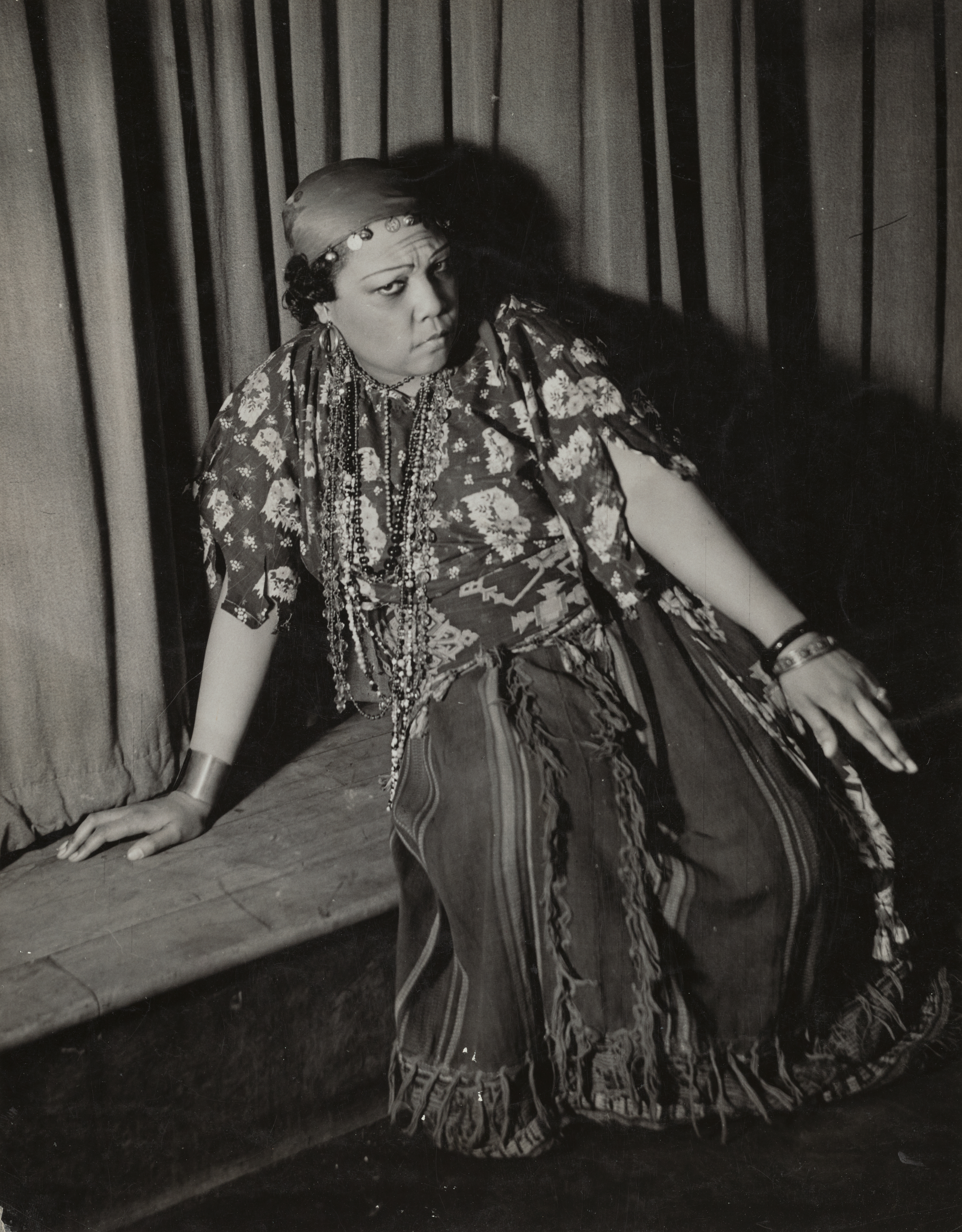
Minto Cato as Azucena in the Federal Music Project production of Il trovatore she staged at the Manhattan Theatre (1936)

Minto Cato (born La Minto Cato, August 23, 1900 – October 26, 1979) was a mezzo-soprano opera singer and show performer during the Harlem Renaissance from the 1920s to the late 1940s.

== Life and career ==
Minto Cato was born in Little Rock, Arkansas. She received her musical education at the Washington Conservatory of Music in Washington, D.C., and soon after began teaching piano in public schools in Arkansas and Georgia. In 1919, she opened a music studio in Detroit.

She started her career on B. F. Keith's vaudeville circuit in Detroit's Temple Theater in 1922. In 1923, Cato married the impresario Joe Sheftell. Around 1924, she gave birth to a daughter named Minto Cato Sheftell. Cato performed in many of Sheftell's shows during the 1920s, including the Creole Bronze Revue. Together they toured of Europe, Alaska, Canada, and Mexico in a show they called the Southland Revue.

In 1927, Cato separated from her husband and began working various venues. At Chicago's Regal Theater, she had a solo act in 1929.She also worked as a vaudeville producer in the United States and abroad. From 1920 until 1930, Cato sang with Louis Armstrong in the Blackbirds shows. She introduced the song "Memories of You" in Blackbirds of 1930.

From show business she went into opera, performing in Il trovatore in 1936, in Aida in New York, Show Boat and Gentlemen Unafraid in 1938, and La traviata in 1947. She returned to Europe, continuing to perform through the early 1950s. She died in New York City in 1979.
