= Mindyukino =

Mindyukino Миндюкино
- Village
- Location within Vologda Oblast Location within Russia
- Coordinates: 58°55′N 37°08′E
- Country: Russia
- Region: Vologda Oblast
- District: Cherepovetsky District
- Time zone: UTC+3:00

Mindyukino (Russian: Миндюкино) is a rural locality (a village) in Korotovskoye Rural Settlement, Cherepovetsky District, Vologda Oblast, Russia. The population was 29 as of 2002. There are 2 streets.

== Geography ==
Mindyukino is located 72 km (45 mi) southwest of Cherepovets (the district's administrative centre) by road. Vorotishino is the nearest rural locality.
