= Lambert (surname) =

Lambert is a surname, and may refer to:

== A ==
- Adam Lambert (born 1982), American recording artist, stage actor
- Adam Lambert (snowboarder) (born 1997), Australian snowboarder
- Adelaide Lambert (1907–1996), American swimmer
- Adrian Lambert (born 1972), English bassist and songwriter
- Adrien Lambert (1913–2003), Canadian politician
- Adrienne Lambert (born 1938/9), New Zealand lawn bowler
- Al Sherrod Lambert (born 1985), American music producer
- Alain Lambert (born 1946), French politician
- Albert Bond Lambert (1875–1946), American aviator
- Albert Edward Lambert (1870–1929), British architect
- Alex Lambert (born 1990), American singer-songwriter
- Alexander Lambert (1863–1929), Polish-American pianist
- Alexandre Lambert de Soyrier (1632–1706), Roman Catholic prelate
- Alice Elinor Lambert (1886–1981), American romance writer
- Alison Lambert (born 1977), British clarinettist
- Alix Lambert, American artist, filmmaker, author and television writer
- Allen Lambert (1911–2002), Canadian banker
- Almeda Lambert (1863–1921), American cookbook writer and businessperson
- Amraal Lambert (c. 1774–1864), Kaiǀkhauan Captain in German South West Africa
- Andreas Lambert (c. 1844–1894), Kaiǀkhauan Captain in German South West Africa
- Andreas Lambert (cricketer) (born 1981), Danish cricketer
- Andrew Lambert (born 1956), English historian
- Andy Lambert, American college football coach
- Angela Lambert (1940–2007), British journalist
- AJ Lambert (Angela Jennifer Lambert) (born 1974), American musician
- Ann Lambert (born 1957), Canadian playwright and author
- Anne-Louise Lambert (born 1955), Australian actress
- Anne-Marie Lambert (born 1945), Swedish gymnast
- Anne-Thérèse de Marguenat de Courcelles, Marquise de Lambert (1647–1733), French writer
- Annie Lambert (born 1946), British actress
- Anthony Lambert (1911–2007), British ambassador
- August Lambert (1916–1945), German Luftwaffe fighter ace
- Arsène Lambert (1834–1901), French general
- Aylmer Bourke Lambert (1761–1842), British botanist

== B ==
- Barbara Lambert, American politician from Connecticut
- Barrie Lambert (1871–1957), English nurse
- Barry Lambert (born 1981), Irish hurler
- Benjamin Lambert (1937–2014), American optometrist and politician
- Bill Lambert (politician) (1930–2019), New Zealand politician
- Bob Lambert (undercover police officer) (born 1952), English member of the Special Demonstration Squad
- Bob Lambert (cricketer) (1874–1956), Irish cricketer
- Bob Lambert (executive) (c. 1957–2012), American media executive with The Walt Disney Company
- Boris Lambert (born 2000), Belgian footballer
- Brad Lambert (American football) (born 1965), American football coach
- Brad Lambert (ice hockey) (born 2003), Finnish-Canadian ice hockey player
- Brian Lambert (Australian footballer) (1930–2017), Australian rules footballer
- Brian Lambert (footballer, born 1936) (1936–2007), English footballer
- Brian Lambert (politician) (1930–2019), New Zealand politician
- Brooke Lambert (1834–1901), English cleric and social reformer

== C ==
- Carlos José Lambert (c.1826–1888), Chilean mining entrepreneur and engineer
- Caroline Lambert (born 1995), French ice hockey player
- Cecil Lambert (1864–1928), British admiral
- Charles Lambert (Archdeacon of Hampstead) (1872–1954), British Anglican priest
- Charles Lambert (Archdeacon of Lancaster) (1894–1983), British Anglican priest
- Charles Lambert (author) (born 1953), English novelist and short-story writer
- Charles Lambert (water polo) (1932–1990), French water polo player
- Charles Lambert d'Outrepont (1746–1809), lawyer from the Austrian Netherlands and legislator in the French First Republic
- Charles Lambert de Sainte-Croix (1827–1889), French politician
- Charles Saint Lambert (1793–1876), Franco-Chilean mining engineer and businessman
- Charles Irwin Lambert (1877–1954), American psychiatrist
- Charles Joseph Lambert (engineer) (1804–1864), French explorer and engineer
- Charles Lucien Lambert (1828–1896), American composer
- Charles-Richard Lambert (1800–1862), American musician, conductor and music educator
- Charles de Lambert (aviator) (1865–1944), early French aviator
- Charles de Lambert (soldier) (1773–1843), Russian Major General during the Napoleonic Wars
- Chloé Lambert (born 1976), French actress
- Chris Lambert (baseball) (born 1983), American baseball pitcher
- Chris Lambert (footballer) (1920–2005), Australian rules footballer
- Chris Lambert (musician) (born 1988), American singer-songwriter
- Chris Lambert (racing driver) (died 1968), British racing driver
- Chris Lambert (sprinter) (born 1981), English sprinter
- Christiane Lambert (born 1961), French farmer and agricultural trade unionist
- Christina Lambert (born 1963), British judge
- Christophe Lambert (footballer) (born 1987), Swiss footballer
- Christophe Lambert (judoka) (born 1985), German judoka
- Christopher Lambert (born 1957), French actor
- Christopher Lambert (MP) (16th century), English politician
- Christopher James Lambert (born 1973), English footballer
- Chuck Lambert, American college football quarterback and coach
- Clara Lambert (1874–1969), British suffragette
- Claude Lambert (born 1969), Canadian boxer
- Clayton Lambert (born 1952), Guyanan cricketer
- Clayton Lambert (baseball) (1917–1981), American baseball pitcher
- Cliff Lambert (born 1930), English rugby league footballer
- Cody Lambert (born 1961), American rodeo rider
- Colin Lambert (born 1958), British educator and politician
- Constant Lambert (1905–1951), British composer
- Craig Lambert (born 1968), Australian rules footballer

== D ==
- Dan Lambert (born 1970), Canadian ice hockey player
- Daniel Lambert (1770–1809), British prison keeper and animal breeder
- Daniel Lambert (ice hockey) (born 1970), Canadian ice hockey player
- Daniel Lambert (rugby union) (1883–1915), English rugby union player
- Daryl Lambert (born 1946), Australian cricketer
- Dave Lambert (American jazz vocalist) (1917–1966), American jazz lyricist and singer
- Dave Lambert (English musician) (born 1949), songwriter, guitarist and singer
- Davey Lambert (1969–2017), English motorcycle racer
- David Lambert (actor) (born 1993), American actor
- David Lambert (director) (born 1974), Belgian film director and screenwriter
- David Lambert (footballer) (1939–2016), Welsh footballer
- David Lambert (trade unionist, born 1922) (1922–1967), Scottish trade union leader and novelist
- David Lambert (trade unionist, born 1933) (1933–2023), British clothing trades union leader
- David L. Lambert, English astronomer
- DaVonte Lambert (born 1994), American football player
- Debra H. Lambert, American lawyer and judge
- Declan Lambert (born 1998), Malaysian footballer
- Denis Lambert (born 1961), Canadian boxer
- Dennis Lambert (born 1947), American musician, songwriter and record producer
- Denny Lambert (born 1970), Canadian ice hockey player
- Denny Lambert (athletic director) (born c. 1929), American athletics coach and administrator
- Denny Lambert (rugby league) (born 1980), Australian rugby league footballer
- Derek Lambert (1929–2001), British journalist and thriller writer
- Diana Lambert (1931–1995), British actress
- Diane Lambert, American statistician
- Dion Lambert (born 1969), American football player
- Dominique Lambert (born 1960), Belgian philosopher and historian of science, and ethicist
- Donald Lambert (1904–1962), American jazz stride pianist
- Dorothea Lambert Chambers (1878–1960), British tennis player
- Doug Lambert (born 1946), Scottish lawn and indoor bowls player
- Douglas Lambert (1883–1915), English rugby union footballer

== E ==
- E. M. Lambert (1905–2000), American college football coach
- Eddie J. Lambert (born 1956), American attorney and politician from Louisiana
- Edie Lambert (born 1968), American television journalist in California
- Edmund Lambert (1666–1734), English lawyer and politician
- Édouard Lambert (1906–1963), French sports shooter
- Edward Lambert (born 1951), English composer
- Edward A. Lambert (1813–1885), American politician and Mayor of Brooklyn
- Edward H. Lambert (1915–2003), American neurophysiologist
- Edward M. Lambert Jr. (born 1958), American politician and government official
- Eleanor Lambert (1903–2003), American fashion publicist
- Eleanor Lambert (cricketer) (died 1994), South African cricket wicket-keeper
- Elizabeth Lambert, maiden name of Jane Shore (c. 1445–c. 1527), mistress of King Edward IV
- Elizabeth Lambert, pen name of American author Penelope Williamson
- Emmanuelle Lambert (born 1975), French writer
- Eric Lambert (author) (1918–1966), Australian author
- Eric Lambert (English footballer) (1920–1979), English footballer
- Ernest Casimir-Lambert (1897–1931), Belgian bobsledder
- Erwin Lambert (1909–1976), Nazi SS officer and Holocaust perpetrator
- Eugene Lambert (1928–2010), Irish puppeteer and actor
- Eugene Lambert (coach) (1905–2000), American football and basketball coach and college athletics administrator
- Ezekiel Roy Lambert (1925–2008), American politician from Georgia

== F ==
- Frances Lambert (needleworker) (1798–1880), British embroiderer, knitter and author
- Francis Lambert (c.1486–1530), French Protestant theologian
- Francis-Roland Lambert (1921–1997), American Roman Catholic bishop
- Francis E. Lambert (1860–1924), American politician and lawyer
- François-Michel Lambert (born 1966), French politician
- Franck Lambert (born 1960), French sprint canoer
- Frank Lambert (American football) (born 1943), American football player
- Frank Lambert (curator) (1884–1973), director of the Walker Art Gallery, Liverpool
- Frank Lambert (inventor) (1851−1937), French-American inventor
- Frank L. Lambert (1918–2018), American theoretical chemist and academic
- Franklin T. Lambert (born 1943), American historian
- Franz Lambert (born 1948), German composer and organist
- Fred B. Lambert (1873–1967), American educator and regional historian from West Virginia
- Frédérique Lambert (born 1992), Canadian racquetball player

== G ==
- Gabrielle Lambert (born 1993), Canadian soccer player
- Gary Lambert (born 1959), American chiropractor, rugby union and rugby league footballer and poker player
- Gary Lambert (politician) (born 1959), American politician from New Hampshire
- Garry Lambert, Australian politician
- Gavin Lambert (1924–2005), British-American screenwriter, novelist and biographer
- Geert Lambert (born 1967), Belgian lawyer and politician
- Gene Lambert (1921–2000), American baseball pitcher
- Geoffrey Lambert, Canadian political candidate
- George Lambert (American politician) (born 1968), American politician from New Hampshire
- George Lambert (Australian politician) (1879–1941), Australian politician in Western Australia
- George Lambert (baritone) (1900–1971), English baritone in Canada
- George Lambert (cricketer) (1919–1991), English cricketer
- George Lambert (English painter) (1700–1765), English landscape painter
- George Lambert (footballer) (1887–1938), Australian rules footballer
- George Lambert (pentathlete) (1928–2012), American modern pentathlete
- George Lambert (Royal Navy officer) (1795–1869), British admiral
- George Lambert (tennis) (1842–1915), British real tennis world champion
- George Lambert (VC) (1819–1860), Irish recipient of the Victoria Cross
- George Jackson Lambert (1794–1880), English organist and composer
- George Washington Lambert (1873–1930), Australian painter
- George Lambert, 1st Viscount Lambert (1866–1958), British Member of Parliament and peer
- George Lambert, 2nd Viscount Lambert (1909–1989), British Member of Parliament and peer, son of the 1st Viscount
- Gordon Lambert (1919–2005), Irish businessman, politician and art collector
- Gordon Lambert (American football) (born 1945), American football player
- Graham Lambert, member of the band Inspiral Carpets
- Grant Lambert (born 1977), Australian cricketer
- Greg Lambert (cricketer) (born 1980), English cricketer
- Greg Lambert (footballer) (born 1947), Australian rules footballer
- Gregg Lambert (born 1961), American philosopher and literary theorist
- Greyson Lambert (born 1994), American football quarterback and baseball pitcher
- Guillaume Lambert (born 1984), Canadian actor and filmmaker from Quebec
- Gustave Lambert (1824–1871), French hydrographer and navigator

== H ==
- Ham Lambert (1910–2006), Irish cricketer and rugby union footballer
- Hans Lambert (1928–2020), Austrian chess player
- Harold Lambert (footballer) (1922–2021), Australian rules footballer
- Harold Lambert (physician) (1926–2017), British medical doctor
- Harold E. Lambert (1893–1967), British linguist and anthropologist in Kenya
- Harry Lambert (sportsman) (1918–1995), Australian cricketer
- Harry Lambert (stylist) (born 1987), British fashion stylist
- Helen Grace Culverwell Marsh-Lambert (1888–1981), British writer and illustrator
- Henri Lambert (1862–1934), Belgian engineer and glass works owner
- Henri Lambert (explorer) (1828–1859), French explorer, diplomat and trader
- Henri François Lambert (1760–1796), French revolutionary army brigadier general
- Henry Lambert (died 1813), British Royal Navy officer
- Henry Lambert (MP) (1786–1861), Irish Member of Parliament
- Herb Lambert (1900–1984), New Zealand cricketer
- Herbert Lambert (1882–1936), British portrait photographer
- Hugh Lambert (1944–2005), Irish journalist
- Hugo Lambert (born 1993/4), French Polynesian swimmer
- Huntington D. Lambert, American academic administrator

== I ==
- Ian Lambert (born 1954/5), Australian army officer and Anglican bishop
- Isaac Cowley Lambert (1850–1909), British solicitor and Member of Parliament

== J ==
- Jack Lambert (American actor) (1920–2002), American actor
- Jack Lambert (American football) (born 1952), American football player
- Jack Lambert (British actor) (1899–1976), Scottish actor
- Jack Lambert (footballer, born 1902) (1902–1940), English footballer
- Jack Lambert (footballer, born 1999), English footballer
- Jack Walter Lambert (1917–1986), English arts journalist, editor and broadcaster
- Jacques Lambert (1891–1948), French architect
- Jaimee Lambert (born 1992), Australian rules footballer
- Jamie Lambert (born 1973), English footballer
- James Lambert (painter) (1725–1788), English painter and musician
- James Lambert (scholar) (1741–1823), English scholar
- James Lambert (ski jumper) (born 1965), British ski jumper
- James Staunton Lambert (1789–1867), Irish politician
- Jane Lambert, maiden name of Jane Shore (c.1445–c.1527), mistress of King Edward IV of England
- Jane Lambert, Australian diplomat
- Janet Lambert (1893–1973), American actress and young-adult fiction author
- Jason Lambert (born 1977), American mixed martial artist
- Jay Lambert (1925–2012), American boxer, doctor and surgeon
- Jean Lambert (born 1950), British politician
- Jean-Michel Lambert (1952–2017), French judge
- Jean Lambert-Rucki (1888–1967), Polish sculptor and graphic artist
- Jenna Lambert (born 1991), Canadian disabled swimmer
- Jerome Lambert (1971–2007), American basketball player
- Jérôme Lambert (born 1957), French politician
- Jerry Lambert (actor) (born 1957), American actor
- Jerry Lambert (jockey) (1940–2015), American jockey
- Jim Lambert (born 1966), American sportswriter
- Jimmy Lambert (born 1994). American baseball pitcher
- Joan A. Lambert (born 1946), American politician from Nevada
- Jodi Lambert (born 1970), Australian sprinter
- Johann Heinrich Lambert (1728–1777), Swiss polymath
- John Lambert of Creg Clare (c. 1610 – c. 1669), Irish Royalist soldier
- John Lambert (basketball) (born 1953), American basketball player
- John Lambert (British Army officer, born 1772) (1772–1847), British Army general and cricketer
- John Lambert (British Army officer, born 1817) (1817–1887), British Army officer and cricketer
- John Lambert (civil servant) (1815–1892), British civil servant
- John Lambert (composer) (1926–1995), British composer and teacher
- John Lambert (diplomat) (1921–2015), British ambassador
- John Lambert (general) (1619–1684), Parliamentary general in the English Civil War
- John Lambert (martyr) (died 1538), English Protestant martyr
- John Lambert (naval historian) (1937–2016), British naval illustrator and author
- John Lambert (politician) (1746–1823), American politician from New Jersey
- John Laurence Lambert (1936–2014), Australian educator and author
- John William Lambert (1860–1952), American automotive pioneer
- Sir John Lambert, 1st Baronet (1666–1723), French-born English merchant
- Johnny Woodly Lambert (born 1980), Costa Rican footballer
- Jonas Lambert-Wenman (c.1665–1732), Swedish pirate
- Jonathan Lambert (actor) (born 1973), French actor and comedian
- Jonathan Lambert (sailor) (1772–1812), American sailor
- Jordan Williams-Lambert (born 1994), American football player
- José Lambert (born 1941), Belgian comparatist and translation scholar
- Joseph Lambert (Haitian politician) (born 1961), Haitian politician
- Joseph Lambert (judge) (born 1948), American judge from Kentucky
- Joseph Charles Lambert, known as J. C. Lambert (c.1803–1875), English comic actor in Australia
- Joseph-François Lambert, (1824–1873), French adventurer and diplomat
- Joseph Hamilton Lambert (1825–1909), American orchardist
- Joseph B. Lambert (born 1940), American educator and chemist
- Joyce Lambert (1916–2005), English botanist and stratigrapher

== K ==
- Kane Lambert (born 1991), Australian rules football player
- Karel Lambert (born 1928), philosopher and logician
- Karl Lambert (1815–1865), Russian general
- Kate Lambert (born 1983), British-American model and fashion designer
- Katherine Lambert, American architect, educator and writer
- Kathy Lambert (born 1953), American educator and politician from Washington State
- KeAndre Lambert-Smith (born 2001), American football player
- Keenan Lambert (born 1992), American football player
- Keith Lambert (born 1947), British cyclist
- Ken Lambert (1928–2002), English footballer
- Kent Lambert, United States Air Force officer and politician from Colorado
- Kent Lambert (American football) (1891–1982), American football player, and college football and basketball coach
- Kent Lambert (rugby) (born 1952), New Zealand rugby union and rugby league footballer
- Kev Lambert (born 1992), Canadian writer from Quebec
- Kevon Lambert (born 1997), Jamaican footballer
- Kit Lambert (1935–1981), English record producer
- Kitty Lambert, American LGBT rights activist
- Kyle Lambert, British poster artist

== L ==
- Lane Lambert (born 1964), Canadian ice hockey player and coach
- Larry Lambert, American politician from Delaware
- Laura Lambert, alternate name of Russian spy Elena Miller
- Laurie Lambert (born 1960), Canadian field hockey player
- Leo Lambert (born 1955), American university president
- Léon Lambert (1928–1987), Belgian banker and art collector
- Leslaine Lambert (born 1958), Guyanese cricketer
- Lillian Lincoln Lambert (fl.1967–2001), American businesswoman
- Linda Lambert, American educator, academic and author
- Lisa Lambert (born 1962(), Canadian actress, writer and composer
- Lisa Lambert (politician), Canadian politician
- Lisa Michelle Lambert, American convicted murderer
- Lisa Schurer Lambert, American management academic
- Lloyd Lambert (1928–1995), American bassist and bandleader
- Loraine Lambert (born 1972), Australian golfer
- Lorraine Lambert (born 1972), British paralympic shooter
- Louis Lambert (politician) (1940–2025), American politician, lawyer and teacher from Louisiana
- Louis Lambert (footballer) (1931–2024), Belgian footballer
- Louis Lambert, pseudonym of the composer Patrick Gilmore (1829–1892)
- Louis A. Lambert, Irish-American cleric and newspaper publisher
- Louise Todd Lambert (1905–1991), American Communist Party activist, organizer and political candidate in California
- Lucien-Léon Guillaume Lambert (1858–1945), French pianist and composer
- Lucille Lambert (fl.1942), American beauty pageant contestant
- Luke Lambert (born 1981/2), American NASCAR crew chief

== M ==
- Madeleine Lambert (1892–1977), French stage, television and film actress
- Marcel Lambert (1919–2000), Canadian politician
- Marcel Lambert (footballer) (born 1876), French footballer
- Malet Lambert (priest) (1853–1931), English Anglican priest
- Marie Lambert (1935–1961), Swiss motorcycle racer
- Marie-Thérèse Join-Lambert (1936–2023), French government official
- Margaret Lambert (1906–1995), British historian
- Margaret Bergmann Lambert (1914–2017), German athlete
- Margot Lambert (born 1999), French badminton player
- Marianne Lambert, French crystallographer
- Marie Lambert (1935–1961), Swiss motorcycle racer
- Marion Lambert (1943–2016), Swiss art collector
- Marjorie F. Lambert (1908–2006), American anthropologist and archaeologist
- Mark Lambert (American actor) (born 1952), American musical theatre actor and singer
- Mark Lambert (Irish actor), Irish stage, film and television actor
- Mark Lambert (rugby union) (born 1985), English rugby union footballer
- Mark Baxter Lambert, American diplomat
- Mark T. Lambert (1895–1962), American businessman and politician from New York
- Martin Lambert (born 1965), English footballer
- Mary Lambert (director) (born 1951), American film and television director
- Mary Lambert (singer) (born 1989), American singer-songwriter
- Mary Lambert Jones, birth name of Mary Dominis (1803–1889), American settler in Hawaii
- Matilda Lambert, Nigerian actress and film producer
- Matt Lambert, American filmmaker and photographer
- Maurice Lambert (1901–1964), British sculptor
- Max Lambert (born 1955), Australian composer and musical director
- Mayer Lambert (1863–1930), French orientalist
- Megan Dowd Lambert, American author and academic
- Melanie Lambert and Fred Palascak (born 1974 and 1975 respectively), pair ice skating team
- Mercedes Lambert, pseudonym of Douglas Anne Munson (1948–2004), American attorney, teacher and writer
- Michael Lambert (snowboarder) (born 1986), Canadian snowboarder
- Michael Lambert (volleyball) (born 1974), American volleyball player
- Michael J. Lambert (born 1944), American psychologist and author
- Mick Lambert (born 1950), English footballer
- Michelle Lambert (born 1985), American pop singer
- Michel Lambert (1610–1696), French singing master, theorbist and composer
- Mick Lambert (born 1950), British football player
- Mieszko II Lambert (990–1034), king of Poland
- Miranda Lambert (born 1983), American country music singer
- Miriam Lambert (puppeteer), Irish puppeteer
- Moira Lambert, British singer and recording artist
- Mollie Lambert (born 1998), English footballer
- Molly Lambert, American journalist, podcaster and social activist
- Mooy Lambert (1550–1625), Dutch naval officer

== N ==
- Nadine Lambert (1926–2006), American psychologist and educator
- Nahum Melvin-Lambert (born 2002), English footballer
- Nathalie Lambert (born 1963), Canadian speed skater
- Nathan Lambert, Australian politician from Victoria
- Nathaniel Lambert (1811–1882), English mine-owner and politician
- Neal E. Lambert (born 1934), American scholar
- Neil Lambert, British theoretical physicist
- Nichole Lambert (born 1948), French illustrator and author
- Nicolas-Eustache Lambert Dumont (1767–1835), Canadian seigneur
- Nigel Lambert (1944–2024), British actor
- Noeleen Lambert (born 1982), Irish camogie player
- Noelle Lambert (born 1997), American paralympian athlete
- Norman Platt Lambert (1885–1965), Canadian politician

== O ==
- Olivier Lambert (born 1971), French fencer
- Oscar Lambert (1890–1970), American sportsman and chess player
- Ossie Lambert (1926–2009), Australian cricketer

== P ==
- Patrick Lambert (born 1963), American Cherokee Principal Chief
- Paul Lambert (born 1969), Scottish football player and manager
- Paul Lambert (actor) (1922–1997), American character actor
- Paul Lambert (basketball) (1934–1978), American college basketball player and coach
- Paul Lambert (bishop) (born 1950), Episcopal suffragan bishop of Dallas
- Paul Lambert (Canadian football) (born 1975), Canadian football player
- Paul Lambert (cooperator) (1912–1977), Belgian co-operator and economist
- Paul Lambert (journalist) (1958/9–2020), British media and television producer
- Paul Lambert (Nebraska politician) (born 1950), Nebraska state senator
- Paul Lambert (Royal Navy officer) (born 1954), Royal Navy admiral
- Paul Lambert (special effects artist), English visual effects supervisor
- Paul Lambert (TV personality) (born 1970), American children's television show figure and technology consultant
- Paul Lambert (water polo) (1908–1996), French water polo player
- Paul C. Lambert (born 1928), American diplomat
- Paula Lambert (born 1943), American cook and author
- Paula Lambert (puppeteer), Irish puppeteer
- Pee Wee Lambert (1924–1965), American mandolinist
- Percy E. Lambert (1881–1913), English car racer
- Peter Lambert (baseball) (born 1997), American baseball pitcher
- Peter Lambert (brigadier), Australian army officer and defence scientist
- Peter Lambert (Gaelic footballer) (fl.1991–2003), Irish sportsperson
- Peter Lambert (rosarian) (1859–1939), German rose breeder
- Peter Lambert (rower) (born 1986), British rower
- Peter J. Lambert, United States Air Force general
- Phil Lambert (1950–2021), Australian television figure
- Philippe Lambert (1930–2011), Belgian banker and art collector
- Phyllis Lambert (born 1927), Canadian architect and philanthropist
- Pierre Lambert (1920–2008), French trotskyist leader
- Pierre-Yves Lambert (born 1949), French linguist and Celtic studies scholar
- Pierre Lambert de la Motte (1624–1679), French Catholic bishop
- Piggy Lambert (1888–1958), American basketball coach

== R ==
- Rachel de Lambert (born 1961), New Zealand landscape architect and urban designer
- Rachel Lambert Mellon (1910–2014), American philanthropist and art collector
- Rae Lambert, 20th century British author
- Ralph Lambert (1667–1731), Irish Anglican priest
- Raoul Lambert (born 1944), Belgian football player
- Ray Lambert (1922–2009), Welsh football player
- Raymond Lambert (1914–1997), Swiss climber
- Reginald Lambert (1882–1968), English cricketer
- Rickie Lambert (born 1982), English football player
- Richard Lambert (born 1944), British businessman
- Richard Lambert (handballer) (born 1948), Canadian handball player
- Richard Cornthwaite Lambert (1868–1939), British barrister and politician
- Richard S. Lambert (1894–1981), English biographer, historian and broadcaster
- Raoul Lambert (born 1944), Belgian footballer
- Rhiannon Lambert (born 1989), English nutritionist and author
- Robert Lambert (academic) (1677–1735), English Anglican priest and academic
- Robert Lambert (Irish republican) (1896–1970), Irish republican fighter
- Robert Lambert (Royal Navy officer) (1771–1836), British admiral
- Robert Lambert (speedway rider) (born 1998), British speedway rider
- Robert-Hugues Lambert (1908–1945), French actor
- Rose Lambert (1878–1974), American missionary in the Ottoman Empire
- Rowley Lambert (1828–1880), Royal Navy officer
- Roy Lambert (footballer) (1933–2022), English footballer
- Roy Lambert (rugby league), Welsh rugby league footballer
- Royston Lambert (1932–1982), British educator, sociologist and historian
- Rudy Lambert (fl.1940s), American member of the California Communist Party
- Ryan Lambert (born 1998), Malaysian footballer

== S ==
- S. H. Lambert, pen name of British writer Stephen Southwold (1887–1964)
- Samantha Lambert, Irish Gaelic football player
- Samuel Lambert (1806–1875), Belgian banker
- Samuel M. Lambert (1914–1991), American labor leader and president of the National Education Association
- Sarah Lambert (born 1970), Australian actor, writer and producer
- Shaena Lambert (born 1959), Canadian novelist and short story writer
- Scrappy Lambert (1901–1987), American jazz band vocalist
- Sep Lambert (1876–1959), Irish cricketer
- Sheela Lambert (1956–2024), American civil rights activist
- Sheila Lambert (born 1980), American basketball player
- Sidney Lambert (c.1838–1905), African-American pianist, music educator and composer
- Simon Lambert (hurler) (born 1988), Irish hurler
- Simon Lambert (speedway rider) (born 1989), British speedway rider
- Stan Lambert (born 1952), American bank executive and politician from Texas
- Stephen Lambert (editor), American TV editor
- Stephen Lambert (field hockey) (born 1979), Australian field hockey goalkeeper
- Stephen Lambert (media executive) (born 1959), British media executive
- Steve Lambert (born 1976), American artist
- Sydney Lambert (1852–1916), New Zealand sportsman
- Suzanne Lambert, American comedian and internet personality

== T ==
- Tamar Lambert (born 1981), Jamaican cricketer
- Terence Lambert (born 1951), British wildlife painter
- Thom Lambert, American legal scholar
- Thomas Lambert (died 1604) (died 1604), English Member of Parliament
- Thomas Lambert (died 1621) (1558–1621), English Member of Parliament
- Thomas Lambert (died 1638) (1585–1638), English landowner and Member of Parliament
- Thomas Lambert (horticulturist) (1854–1944), New Zealand doctor, horticulturist and journalist
- Thomas Lambert (priest) (died 1694), English Anglican priest
- Thomas Lambert (skier) (born 1984), Swiss freestyle skier
- Thomas Drummond Lambert (1837–1911), English veterinary surgeon
- Thomas Eyre Lambert (1820–1919), Irish soldier and landlord
- Thomas Scott Lambert (1819–1897), American physician
- Thomas Stanton Lambert (1870/1–1921), British Army officer
- Tina Lambert, American politician from Idaho
- Tom Lambert (cricketer) (born 1981), English cricketer
- Tom Lambert (rugby union) (born 2000), Australian rugby union footballer
- Tony Lambert (born 1948), author on Christianity in China

== V ==
- Valérie Lambert (born 1988), Canadian speed skater
- Verity Lambert (1935–2007), British television producer

== W ==
- Wal Lambert (1916–1993), Australian rower
- Wallace Lambert (1922–2009), Canadian psychologist and academic
- Walter Davis Lambert (1879–1968), American geodesist
- Ward Lambert (1888–1958), American college basketball coach
- Wayne W. Lambert (born 1936), United States Air Force Brigadier General
- Wilfred G. Lambert (1926–2011), British archaeologist
- William Lambert (abolitionist) (1817–1890), African-American citizen and abolitionist
- William Lambert (Australian politician) (1881–1928), Australian politician
- William Lambert (cricketer, born 1779) (1779–1851), English cricketer
- William Lambert (journalist) (1920–1998), American journalist
- William Lambert (writer) (died 1834), engrosser of the United States Bill of Rights
- William Lambert (Middlesex cricketer) (1843–1927), English cricketer
- William Lambert (MP) (fl.1529), Member of the Parliament of England
- William Frederick Lambert (1834–1908), Irish-Australian industrialist and politician in Queensland
- William C. Lambert (1894–1982), American World War I flying ace
- William Jay Lambert III (born 1948), American bishop of the Episcopal Church

== Y ==
- Yumi Lambert (born 1995), Belgian fashion model
- Yves Lambert (1936–2021), French aerospace engineer
- Yvon Lambert (born 1950), Canadian ice hockey player
- Yvon Lambert (photographer) (born 1955), Luxembourgish photographer
- Yvonne Lambert, member of the band The Octopus Project

== See also ==
- Lamberti
- Lamberts
- Lambart
