= Paul Lambert (disambiguation) =

Paul Lambert (born 1969) is a Scottish football manager and former player.

Paul Lambert may also refer:

- Paul Lambert (water polo) (1908–1996), French water polo player
- Paul Lambert (actor) (1922–1997), American character actor
- Paul Lambert (basketball) (1934–1978), American college basketball coach
- Paul Lambert (cooperator) (1912–1977), Belgian co-operator and economist
- Paul Lambert (1876–?), Belgian Olympic equestrian, 1900
- Paul Lambert (journalist) (1958/59–2020), British media and television producer
- Paul Lambert (Nebraska politician) (born 1950), Nebraska state senator
- Paul Lambert (Royal Navy officer) (born 1954), Royal Navy admiral
- Paul Lambert (TV personality) (born 1970), best known as "Engineer Ed" in the children's television show Fun Junction Depot
- Paul Lambert (Canadian football) (born 1975), Canadian football offensive guard
- Paul Lambert (Emmerdale), a fictional character in the British soap opera Emmerdale
- Paul Lambert (bishop) (born 1950), suffragan bishop of Dallas
- Paul Lambert (special effects artist), visual effects supervisor at DNEG
- Paul C. Lambert (born 1928), United States Ambassador to Ecuador
- Lambert (pianist) (born 1983), masked neo-classical musician born Paul Lambert

== See also ==
- Lambert (name)
