= Thomas Lambert =

Thomas Lambert may refer to:

== Politicians ==
- Thomas Lambert (died 1604) (died 1604), MP for Wareham, England
- Thomas Lambert (died 1621) (1558–1621), English MP for Southampton
- Thomas Lambert (died 1638) (1585–1638), English politician, MP for Hindon

== Sports ==
- Thomas Lambert (skier) (born 1984), Swiss freestyle skier
- Tom Lambert (cricketer) (born 1981), English cricketer
- Tom Lambert (rugby union) (born 2000), Scottish rugby union player

== Others ==
- Thomas Eyre Lambert (1820–1919), Irish soldier and landlord
- Thomas Lambert (horticulturist) (1854–1944), New Zealand doctor, horticulturist, journalist, and writer
- Thomas Lambert (priest) (died 1694), English Anglican priest
- Thom Lambert, American legal scholar
- Thomas Drummond Lambert (1837–1911), English veterinary surgeon
- Thomas Scott Lambert (1819–1897), American physician
- Thomas Stanton Lambert, British Army officer
- Thomas Lambert House, in Rowley, Massachusetts
- Thomas Lambert of the Lambert baronets
