= Frank Lambert =

Frank Lambert may refer to:

- Frank L. Lambert (1918−2018), professor emeritus of chemistry at Occidental College, Los Angeles
- Franklin T. Lambert (fl.1990), professor of history at Purdue University
- Frank Lambert (curator), director of the Walker Art Gallery, Liverpool, 1933−1953
- Frank Lambert (inventor) (1851−1937), French American inventor
- Frank Lambert (American football) (born 1943), American football punter

== See also ==
- Francis Lambert (c. 1486–1530), French Protestant theologian
