= John Lambert =

John Lambert may refer to:

- John Lambert (martyr) (died 1538), English Protestant martyred during the reign of Henry VIII
- John Lambert (general) (1619–1684), Parliamentary general in the English Civil War
- John Lambert of Creg Clare (fl. c. 1645 – c. 1669), Irish soldier and Royalist
- Sir John Lambert, 1st Baronet (1666–1723), French-born English merchant
- John Lambert (politician) (1746–1823), U.S. senator from and Acting Governor of New Jersey
- John Lambert (British Army officer) (1772–1847), British Army general and cricketer
- John William Lambert (1860–1952), American automotive pioneer
- John Lambert (civil servant) (1815–1892), British civil servant
- John Lambert (composer) (1926–1995), British composer and teacher
- John Lambert (diplomat) (1921–2015), British ambassador
- John Laurence Lambert (1936–2014), Australian educator and author
- John Lambert (naval historian) (1937–2016), naval illustrator and author
- Jack Lambert (American football) (John Harold Lambert, born 1952), American football player
- John Lambert (basketball) (born 1953), American basketball player

== See also ==
- Jack Lambert (disambiguation)
