= Henry Lambert (disambiguation) =

Henry Lambert (died 1813) was an officer of the British Royal Navy.

Henry Lambert may also refer to:

- Henry Lambert (MP) (1786–1861), Irish member of parliament
- Sir Henry Lambert, 5th Baronet, High Sheriff of Oxfordshire
- Henry Lambert of the Lambert baronets
- Harry Lambert (sportsman) (1918–1995), Australian footballer and cricketer

== See also ==
- Harry Lambert (disambiguation)
