= Louis Lambert =

Louis Lambert may refer to:

- Louis Lambert (politician) (1940–2025), American politician, lawyer and teacher from Louisiana
- Louis Lambert (footballer) (1931–2024), Belgian footballer
- Louis A. Lambert, Irish-American cleric and newspaper publisher
- Patrick Gilmore (1829–1892), composer who worked under the pseudonym Louis Lambert
- Louis Lambert (novel), an 1832 novel by Honoré de Balzac
- St. Louis Lambert International Airport
