= Jonathan Lambert =

Jonathan Lambert may refer to:

- Jonathan Lambert (sailor) (1772–1812), American sailor
- Jonathan Lambert (actor) (born 1973), French actor and comedian
- Jonathan Lambert (illustrator), children's book illustrator including the pop-up classic Wide Mouthed Frog

== See also ==
- John Lambert (disambiguation)
