= Peter Lambert =

Peter Lambert may refer to:

- Peter Lambert (baseball) (born 1997), American baseball pitcher
- Peter Lambert (brigadier) (contemporary), Australian army officer and defence scientist
- Peter Lambert (Gaelic footballer) (fl. 1991–2003), retired Irish sportsperson
- Peter Lambert (rosarian) (1859–1939), German rosarian
- Peter Lambert (rower) (born 1986), British rower
- Peter J. Lambert, United States Air Force general

== See also ==
- Richard Lambert (Richard Peter Lambert, born 1944), British journalist and business executive
