= Jack Lambert =

Jack Lambert may refer to:

- Jack Lambert (British actor) (1899–1976), Scottish actor
- Jack Lambert (footballer, born 1902) (1902–1940), English footballer
- Jack Walter Lambert (1917–1986), English arts journalist, editor and broadcaster
- Jack Lambert (American actor) (1920–2002), American actor
- Jack Lambert (American football) (born 1952), American football player
- Jack Lambert (footballer, born 1999), English footballer

== See also ==
- John Lambert (disambiguation)
