= Eric Lambert =

Eric Lambert may refer to:

- Eric Lambert (author) (1918–1966), Australian author
- Eric Lambert (English footballer) (1920–1979), English footballer
- Eric Lambert, musician in the band Blessthefall
