= James Lambert =

James Lambert may refer to:

- James Lambert (painter) (1725–1788), English painter and musician
- James Lambert (scholar) (1741–1823), English scholar
- James Staunton Lambert (1789–1867), Irish politician
- James Lambert, Dublin lord mayor in 1859
- James Lambert (ski jumper) (born 1965), British ski jumper
- James Lambert (programmer), video game and homebrew software developer
- Jim Lambert (born 1966), American sportswriter
- Jamie Lambert (born 1973), English footballer
