= J. H. Lambert =

J. H. Lambert may refer to:

- Johann Heinrich Lambert (1728–1777), Swiss mathematician, physicist and astronomer
- Joseph Hamilton Lambert (1825–1909), American orchardist and developer of the Lambert cherry

== See also ==
- Lambert (surname)
