= Harry Lambert =

Harry Lambert may refer to:

- Harry Lambert (sportsman) (1918–1995), Australian cricketer and player of Australian rules football
- Harry Lambert (stylist) (born 1987), British editorial and celebrity fashion stylist

== See also ==
- Henry Lambert (disambiguation)
- Harold Lambert (disambiguation)
