= Brian Lambert =

Brian Lambert may refer to:

- Brian Lambert (politician) (1930–2019), New Zealand politician
- Brian Lambert (footballer, born 1936) (1936–2007), English footballer
- Brian Lambert (Australian footballer) (born 1930), Australian rules footballer
