= Anatomy of the Ship series =

The Anatomy of the Ship series of books are comprehensive treatments of the design and construction of individual ships. They have been published by Conway Maritime Press (now Conway Publishing) since the 1980s, and republished in the US by the Naval Institute Press.

== About the series ==
Each volume begins with a general history of the vessel, as preface to a set of detailed scale drawings showing every part of the interior and exterior, from keel to masthead. Black-and-white photographs and engravings, including of ship models for older types, round out the description. Since 1998, each volume has carried a large-scale plan on the reverse of the fold-off dust jacket.

According to its producers, the series ‘aims to provide the finest documentation of individual ships and ship types ever published. What makes the series unique is a complete set of superbly executed line drawings, both the conventional type of plan as well as explanatory views, with fully descriptive keys. These are supported by technical details and a record of the ship’s service.’

The ships chosen are a mix of famous vessels, such as HMS Victory and Yamato, and less-famous ships that are well-documented representatives of their class (HMS Bellona, Lawhill).

== Classification ==
The series is divided into two distinct – yet broadly encompassing – categories, identified by colour coding. Firstly, those presented in a yellow-and-silver themed dust jacket relate to ‘non-motor-propelled’ ships. This group tracks the development of ship design from The Ships of Christopher Columbus, through to the end of the age of sail (those designed or constructed approximately up until the 1860s), such as the HMS Beagle: Survey Ship Extraordinaire, 1820–70, by Karl Heinz Marquardt.

Ships thereafter, powered by steam and screw propulsion, are represented in silver-and-blue themed dust jackets. These include submarines, the Japanese World War II vessel, The Battleship Yamato, by Janusz Skulski, and The Aircraft Carrier Victorious, by Ross Watton.

== Index ==
Title	Author	Year	ISBN
The Flower Class Corvette Agassiz	John McKay and John Harland	1993	ISBN 0851779751
The Naval Cutter Alert, 1777	Peter Goodwin	2003 (Revised ed. 2004)	ISBN 0851779689
The Submarine Alliance	John Lambert, David Hill	1986	ISBN 085177380X
The Cruiser Bartolomeo Colleoni	Franco Gay, Gay Valerio	1987	ISBN 0851774539
HMS Beagle Survey Ship Extraordinary, 1820–1870	Karl Heinz Marquardt	1997	ISBN 0851777031
The Cruiser Belfast	Ross Watton	1985 (Reprinted 2003)	ISBN 0851779565
The 74-Gun Ship Bellona	Brian Lavery	1985 (Reprinted 2003)	ISBN 0851773680
The Schooner Bertha L. Downs	Basil Greenhill, Sam Manning	1995	ISBN 0851776159
The Battleship Bismarck	Jack Brower	2005	ISBN 0851779824
The Battleship Bismarck	Stefan Draminski	2018	ISBN 1472828887
The 20-Gun Ship Blandford	Peter Goodwin	1988	ISBN 0851774695
The Armed Transport Bounty	John McKay	1989 (Reprinted 2001)	ISBN 0851775020
The Destroyer Campbeltown	Al Ross	1990 (Reprinted 2004)	ISBN 0851779972
The Royal Yacht Caroline, 1749	Sergio Bellabarba, Giorgio Osculati	1989	ISBN 0851774962
The Ships of Christopher Columbus (Niña, Pinta, Santa María)	Xavier Pastor	1992	ISBN 1844860140
The 44-Gun Frigate USS Constitution	Karl Heinz Marquardt	2005	ISBN 1844860108
The Frigate Diana	David White	1987	ISBN 0851773567
The Battleship Dreadnought	John Roberts	1992 (Reprinted 2001)	ISBN 085177895X
Captain Cook's Endeavour	Karl Heinz Marquardt	1995 (Revised ed. 2003)	ISBN 0851778968
The Destroyer Escort England	Al Ross	1985	ISBN 0851773257
The 32-Gun Frigate Essex	Portia Takakjian	2005	ISBN 0851775411
The Fairmile D Motor Torpedo Boat	John Lambert	1985 (Revised ed. 2005)	ISBN 184486006X
The Battleship Fusō	Janusz Skulski	1998	ISBN 0851776655
The Escort Carrier Gambier Bay	Al Ross	1993	ISBN 1557502358
The Bomb Vessel Granado, 1742	Peter Goodwin	1989	ISBN 0851775225
The Battlecruiser Hood	John Roberts	1982 (Reprinted 1989, 2001)	ISBN 085177900X
The Aircraft Carrier Intrepid	John Roberts	1982	ISBN 0851779662
The Battleship USS Iowa	Stefan Draminski	2020	ISBN 1472827295
The Destroyer USS Kidd	Stefan Draminski	2024	ISBN 1472827414
The Four Masted Barque Lawhill	Kenneth Edwards, Roderick Anderson, Richard Cookson	1996	ISBN 0851776760
Tudor Warship Mary Rose	Douglas McElvogue	2020	ISBN 1472845730
The 24-Gun Frigate Pandora, 1779	John McKay & Ron Coleman	2003 (Revised ed.)	ISBN 0851778941
The Liner Queen Mary	Ross Watton	1989	ISBN 0851775292
The Battleship Scharnhorst	Stefan Draminski	2021	ISBN 1472840232
The Destroyer The Sullivans	Al Ross	1988	ISBN 0851774768
The Susan Constant, 1605	Brian Lavery	1989	ISBN 0870215833
The Heavy Cruiser Takao	Janusz Skulski	1994 (Reprinted 2004)	ISBN 1557503540
The Type VII U-boat	David Westwood	1984 (Reprinted 1986)	ISBN 0851773141
The Type XXI U-boat	Fritz Kohl, Eberhard Rossler	2002	ISBN 0851779220
The Aircraft Carrier Victorious	Ross Watton	1991 (Reprinted 2004)	ISBN 0851779964
The 100-Gun Ship Victory	John McKay	1987 (Reprinted 1995)	ISBN 0851777988
The Battleship Warspite	Ross Watton	1986 (Reprinted 2004)	ISBN 0851779212
The Battleship Yamato	Janusz Skulski	1988	ISBN 0851774903
