= Murder of Grégory Villemin =

Murder of a French child

- Victim Grégory Villemin
- Location: Near Docelles, Vosges, France
- Date: 16 October 1984; 42 years ago
- Attack type: kidnapping and child murder by drowning
- Victims: Grégory Villemin, aged 4
- Perpetrator: Unknown
- Motive: Revenge against Grégory's father for unclear reasons
- Charges: Christine Villemin: Murder (dropped due to lack of evidence)
- Litigation: Defamation lawsuit between two individuals (Note: Patrick Faivre and Murielle Bolle.) involved in the case.

Grégory Villemin (24 August 1980 – 16 October 1984) was a French boy from Lépanges-sur-Vologne, Vosges, who was abducted from his home and murdered at the age of four. His body was found four kilometres (2.5 mi) away in the River Vologne near Docelles. The case became known as the Grégory Case (French: l'Affaire Grégory) and for decades has received public interest and media coverage in France. The murder remains unsolved.

It is considered exceptional in French judicial history due to its longevity, its context, the victim’s profile, the enigmatic nature of the motive and circumstances of the crime, as well as the numerous twists and turns it has taken, including the 1985 murder of Bernard Laroche, one of the suspects, by little Grégory’s father, and the 2017 suicide of Jean-Michel Lambert, the first investigating judge, who had been heavily criticized for his handling of the case.

== Preceding events ==
From September 1981 to October 1984, Grégory's parents, Jean-Marie and Christine Villemin, and his paternal grandparents, Albert and Monique Villemin, received numerous anonymous letters and phone calls from a man threatening revenge against Jean-Marie for some unknown offence. The communications indicated he possessed detailed knowledge of the extended Villemin family.

== Murder ==
Shortly after 5:00 pm on 16 October 1984, Christine Villemin reported Grégory to police as missing after she noticed he was no longer playing in the Villemins' front yard. At 5:30 pm, Gregory's uncle Michel Villemin informed the family he had just been told by an anonymous caller that the boy had been taken and thrown into the River Vologne. At 9:00 pm, Grégory's body was found in the Vologne with his hands and feet bound with rope and a woollen hat pulled down over his face.

== Aftermath ==
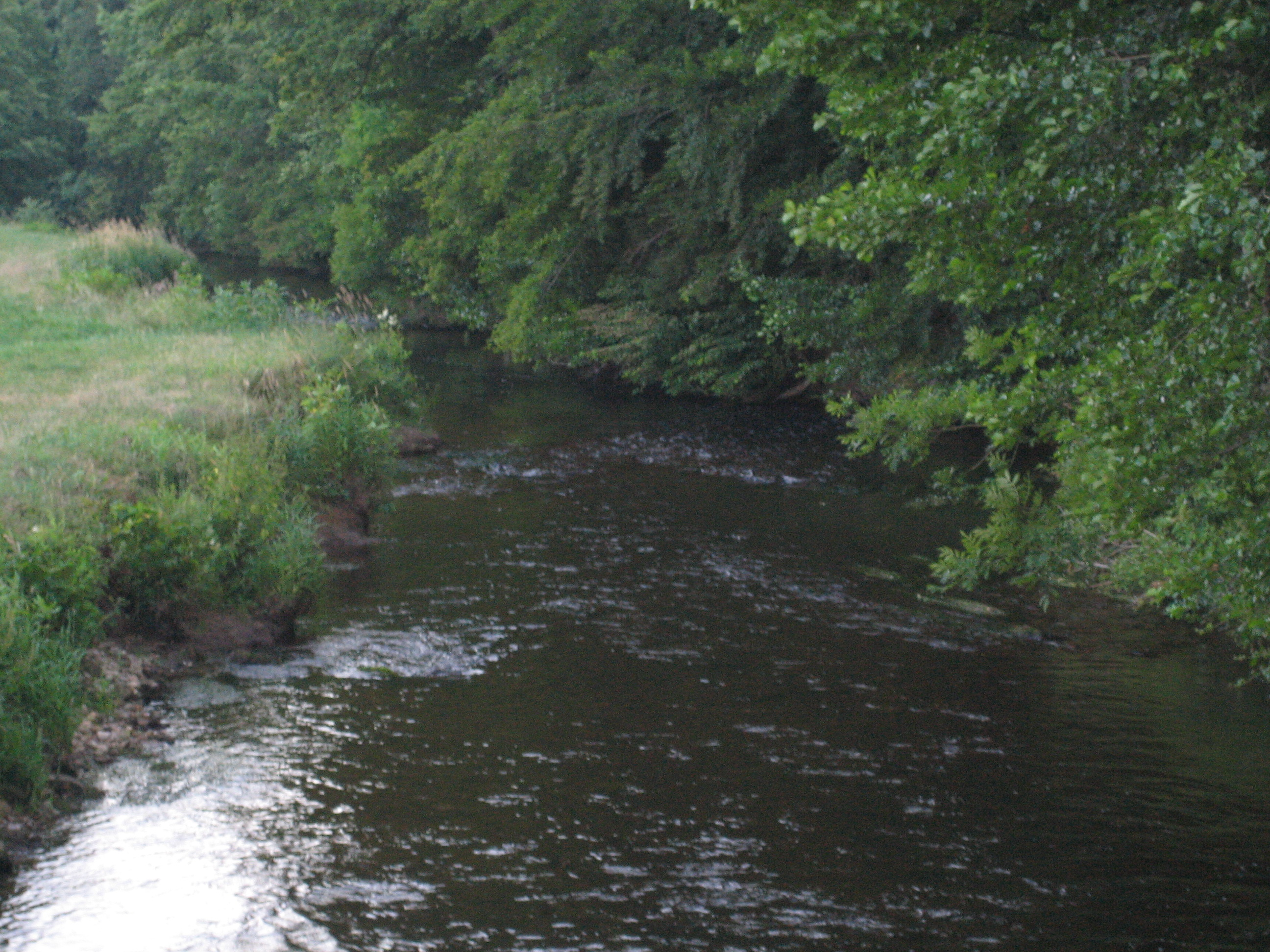
The Vologne, where Grégory Villemin's body was discovered

On 17 October, the Villemins received another anonymous letter that said, "I have taken vengeance". From then on, the unidentified author was referred to in the media as Le Corbeau ("The Raven"), French slang for an anonymous letter-writer, a term made popular by the 1943 film Le Corbeau.

Bernard Laroche, a cousin of Jean-Marie Villemin, was implicated in the murder by handwriting experts and by a statement from Laroche's sister-in-law Murielle Bolle. He was taken into custody on 5 November 1984. Bolle later recanted her testimony, saying it had been coerced by police. Laroche, who denied any part in the crime or being "the Raven", was released from custody on 4 February 1985. Jean-Marie vowed in front of reporters that he would kill Laroche.

On 25 March 1985, handwriting experts identified Grégory's mother Christine as the likely author of the anonymous letters. On 29 March Jean-Marie shot and killed Laroche as he was leaving for work. He was convicted of murder and sentenced to five years in prison. With credit for time served awaiting trial and a partial suspension of the sentence, he was released in December 1987 after having served two and a half years.

In July 1985, Christine was charged with murdering Grégory. Pregnant at the time, she launched a hunger strike that lasted eleven days. Christine was freed after an appeals court cited flimsy evidence and the absence of a coherent motive. She reportedly collapsed and miscarried, losing one of the twins she was carrying shortly after being questioned by authorities. She was cleared of the charges on 2 February 1993.

The case was reopened in 2000 to allow for DNA testing on a stamp used to send one of the anonymous letters, but the tests were inconclusive. In December 2008, following an application by the Villemins, a judge ordered the case reopened to allow DNA testing of the letters, the rope found on Grégory's body, and other evidence. This testing too proved inconclusive. Further DNA testing in April 2013 on Grégory's clothes and shoes was also inconclusive.

== Later events ==
On 14 June 2017, based on new evidence, three people were arrested: Grégory's great-aunt and great-uncle, as well as an aunt—the widow of Michel, who died in 2010. The aunt was released, while the great-aunt and great-uncle invoked their right to remain silent. Murielle Bolle was also arrested and held for thirty-six days before being released, as were the others who had been detained.

On 11 July 2017, the magistrate in charge of the first investigation, Jean-Michel Lambert, died by suicide. In a farewell letter to a local newspaper, Lambert cited the increasing pressure he felt as a result of the case being reopened as the reason for ending his life.

In 2018, Bolle authored a book on her involvement in the case, Breaking the Silence. In the book, she maintained her innocence and that of Laroche, and blamed police for coercing her into implicating him. In June 2017, Bolle's cousin Patrick Faivre told police that Bolle's family had physically abused her in 1984 in order to make her recant her initial testimony against Laroche. Bolle accused Faivre of lying about the reason why she recanted her initial statement. In June 2019, she was indicted for aggravated defamation after Faivre lodged a complaint with police. In January 2020, the Court of Appeal of Paris determined that Bolle's 1984 detention by police had been unconstitutional; the court ordered to remove from the investigative file the statements Bolle had made while in custody. However, the statements Bolle made while not in custody remain in the file, including the initial allegations against Laroche that she subsequently retracted.

Monique Villemin, Grégory's paternal grandmother, died from COVID-19 complications on 19 April 2020 at the age of 88. During the 2017 investigation, Monique was named by investigators as the author of a 1990 threatening letter sent to Judge Maurice Simon, who had succeeded Jean-Michel Lambert as investigating judge on the case in 1987.

In June 2025, Jacqueline Jacob, Grégory's octogenarian great-aunt, was questioned again with a view to indictment. News accounts indicated that police intended to use stylometry to determine whether Jacob can be connected to The Raven's writings.

== In popular culture ==
The murder and investigation have been the subject of several documentary series including The Curse of the Vologne (France 3 2018) and Who Killed Little Gregory? (Netflix 2019).

The 6-episode 2021 French mini-series Une affaire française (a.k.a. A French Case) dramatized the case, casting a harsh light on career-minded judicial investigators and a scapegoating, fact-free media. The writer Marguerite Duras (played by a chain-smoking Dominique Blanc) is depicted in a particularly damning light, as she insinuates herself into the investigation by accusing the mother of the crime, based on no evidence except her own fabricated psychological theories, helping to whip up a judicial witch-hunt.

== See also ==
- List of unsolved murders (1980–1999)
