= Bagger–Lambert–Gustavsson action =

In theoretical physics, in the context of M-theory, the action for the N=8 M2 branes in full is (with some indices hidden):

$$S = \int{ \left( -\frac{1}{2} D^\mu X_I D_\mu X_I +\frac{i}{2} \overline{\Psi} \Gamma^\mu D_\mu \Psi +\frac{i}{4} \overline{\Psi} \Gamma_{IJ} \left[ X^I, X^J, \Psi \right] - \frac{1}{12} \left[ X^I, X^J, X^K \right] \left[ X^I, X^J, X^K \right] + \frac{1}{2}\varepsilon^{abc}Tr(A_a\partial_b A_c + \frac{2}{3}A_a A_b A_c)\right) }d\sigma^3$$

where [, ] is a generalisation of a Lie bracket which gives the group constants.

The only known compatible solution however is:

$$\left[A,B,C\right]_\eta \equiv \varepsilon^{\mu\nu\tau\eta}A_\mu B_\nu C_\tau$$

using the Levi-Civita symbol which is invariant under SO(4) rotations. M5 branes can be introduced by using an infinite symmetry group.

The action is named after Jonathan Bagger, Neil Lambert, and Andreas Gustavsson.
