= Jonathan Bagger =

American theoretical physicist

Jonathan Anders Bagger (born August 7, 1955) is an American theoretical physicist, specializing in high energy physics and string theory and known for the Bagger–Lambert–Gustavsson action.

Bagger received his bachelor's degree in 1977 from Dartmouth College. He spent the academic year 1977–1978 at the University of Cambridge as a Churchill Scholar. In 1978 he became a graduate student in physics at Princeton University, where he received his PhD in 1983. His doctoral thesis Matter Couplings in Supergravity Theories was supervised by Edward Witten. He was a postdoc from 1983 to 1986 at the Stanford Linear Accelerator Center. He was from 1986 to 1989 an associate professor at Harvard University. At Johns Hopkins University he became in 1989 a full professor, holding a professorial chair there until 2014. In 2014 he was appointed director of TRIUMF, Canada's national laboratory for particle and nuclear physics.

Bagger's research deals with high-energy physics, supersymmetry, and string theory. He was at Princeton's Institute for Advanced Study for the academic year 1985–1986 and in 1998. He was elected in 1997 a Fellow of the American Physical Society and in 2008 a Fellow of the American Association for the Advancement of Science. He was an associate editor of Physical Review Letters from 1990 to 1993 and of Physical Review D from 1998 to 2007. He joined in 1997 the editorial board of the Journal of High Energy Physics and in 1998 the editorial board of Physics Reports.

== Publications ==
- Wess, Julius and Bagger, Jonathan (December 1983). Supersymmetry and Supergravity. Princeton Series in Physics. ISBN 0-691-08326-6 / 0-691-08556-0
- Wess, Julius and Bagger, Jonathan (March 1992). Supersymmetry and Supergravity: Revised and Expanded Edition. Princeton Series in Physics. ISBN 0-691-02530-4
- as editor: Bagger, Jonathan A. (1999). Supersymmetry, Supergravity and Supercolliders. Proceedings of the TASI 97. World Scientific. doi:10.1142/4050. ISBN 978-981-02-3816-2.
