= Lamberts =

Lamberts is a surname, and may refer to:

- Gerrit Lamberts (1776–1850), Dutch painter and curator
- Heath Lamberts (1941–2005), Canadian actor
- Koen Lamberts (born 1964), British-Belgian psychologist and academic
- Philippe Lamberts (born 1963), Belgian politician

== See also ==
- Lambert (surname)
