= Who Killed Little Gregory? =

2019 documentary television miniseries

- French: Grégory
- Genre: Documentary; Crime; Drama
- Country of origin: France
- Original language: French
- No. of seasons: 1
- No. of episodes: 5

Production
- Running time: 53–69 minutes

Original release
- Release: November 20, 2019

Who Killed Little Gregory? (French: Grégory) is a 2019 documentary television miniseries. The premise revolves around the murder of 4-year-old Grégory Villemin in 1984. The case became a media spectacle in France, and no killer has ever been identified.

== Cast ==
- Page Leong as Marie-Christine Chastant-Morano
- William Salyers as Etienne Sesmat
- James Simenc as Jean-Marie Villemin
- Peter James Smith as Gerard Welzer
- Jayne Taini as Edith Gaudin

== Release ==
Who Killed Little Gregory? was released on November 20, 2019, on Netflix.
