= Harold Lambert =

Harold Lambert may refer to:

- Harold Lambert (physician) (1926–2017), British medical doctor
- Harold Lambert (footballer) (1922–2021), former Australian rules footballer
- Harold E. Lambert (1893–1967), British linguist and anthropologist in Kenya

== See also ==
- Harry Lambert (disambiguation)
