= Lisa Schurer Lambert =

Professor of management

Academic background
- Education: University of North Carolina at Chapel Hill
- Thesis: Competing models of cognitive appraisal in psychological contract research (2004)

Lisa Schurer Lambert is an American management academic. She is the William S. Spears Chair of Business at Oklahoma State University–Stillwater, which is the flagship campus of the Oklahoma State University System. Her focus is management, business and she has authored papers specializing in employment relationship, leadership, psychological contracts, and person-environment fit theory. In 2022 Lambert was named co-editor of the journal Organizational Research Methods.

== Career ==
Lambert graduated from Northwestern University in 1981 with a B.S., and received an M.M. from the same institution in 1988. She earned her Ph.D. from the University of North Carolina at Chapel Hill in 2004. Following her Ph.D. she was a professor at Georgia State University from 2004 until 2018. In 2018 she moved to Oklahoma State University, and she was named the William S. Spears Chair of Business in 2021.

From 2016 to 2021, she was Associate Editor of Organizational Research Methods. Starting January 2022 Lambert was named the co-editor of the journal Organizational Research Methods which makes, and her co-editor Tine Köhler, the first female scholars to lead the journal, which is published on behalf of the Academy of Management.

From 2018 to 2023, she was president of the Southern Management Association, and she has been a fellow of the organization since 2016.

Lambert is known for her work on employee relations, with her research addressing how employees interact with their bosses and leadership styles of CEOs.

== Works ==
- Tepper, Bennett J.; Duffy, Michelle K.; Henle, Christine A.; Lambert, Lisa Schurer (2006). "Procedural Injustice, Victim Precipitation, and Abusive Supervision". Personnel Psychology. 59 (1): 101–123. doi:10.1111/j.1744-6570.2006.00725.x. ISSN 0031-5826.
- Lambert, Lisa Schurer; Edwards, Jeffrey R.; Cable, Daniel M. (2003). "Breach and Fulfillment of the Psychological Contract: A Comparison of Traditional and Expanded Views". Personnel Psychology. 56 (4): 895–934. doi:10.1111/j.1744-6570.2003.tb00244.x.
- Edwards, Jeffrey R.; Lambert, Lisa Schurer (2007). "Methods for integrating moderation and mediation: A general analytical framework using moderated path analysis". Psychological Methods. 12 (1): 1–22. doi:10.1037/1082-989x.12.1.1. ISSN 1939-1463. PMID 17402809.
- Lambert, Lisa Schurer; Tepper, Bennett J.; Carr, Jon C.; Holt, Daniel T.; Barelka, Alex J. (2012). "Forgotten but not gone: An examination of fit between leader consideration and initiating structure needed and received". Journal of Applied Psychology. 97 (5): 913–930. doi:10.1037/a0028970. ISSN 1939-1854. PMID 22708919.
- Lambert, Lisa Schurer (July 2011). "Promised and delivered inducements and contributions: An integrated view of psychological contract appraisal". Journal of Applied Psychology. 96 (4): 695–712. doi:10.1037/a0021692. ISSN 1939-1854. PMID 21142346.
- Shipp, Abbie J.; Gabriel, Allison S.; Lambert, Lisa Schurer (2021). "Profiles in Time: Understanding the Nature and Outcomes of Profiles of Temporal Focus". Journal of Applied Psychology. 107 (9): 1640–1654. doi:10.1037/apl0000950. ISSN 0021-9010. PMID 34618521. S2CID 238477342.

== Awards and honors ==
In 2013 Lambert received the Robert McDonald Advancement of Organizational Research Methodology Award for her 2007 paper published with Jeffrey Edwards.
