= Organizational Research Methods =

- Discipline: Industrial and organizational psychology, management studies, organizational studies
- Language: English
- Edited by: Paul D. Bliese

Publication details
- History: 1998-present
- Publisher: SAGE Publications on behalf of the Research Methods Division of the Academy of Management
- Frequency: Quarterly
- Impact factor: 9.5 (2022)

Standard abbreviations
- ISO 4: Organ. Res. Methods

Indexing
- ISSN: 1094-4281 (print); 1552-7425 (web)
- LCCN: 98657289
- OCLC no.: 37175211

Links
- Journal homepage; Online access; Online archive

Organizational Research Methods is a quarterly peer-reviewed academic journal published by SAGE Publications on behalf of the Research Methods Division of the Academy of Management. It covers research methods in organizational and management studies, including both qualitative and quantitative approaches. The editor-in-chief is Paul D. Bliese (University of South Carolina). The journal was established in 1998.

== Abstracting and indexing ==
The journal is abstracted and indexed in Scopus and the Social Sciences Citation Index. According to the Journal Citation Reports, it has a 2022 impact factor of 9.5.
