= Kent Lambert (American football) =

American football player and sports coach (1891–1982)

Biographical details
- Born: February 27, 1891; Deadwood, South Dakota, U.S.
- Died: December 13, 1982 (aged 91); San Antonio, Texas, U.S.

Playing career

Football
- 1909–1912: Wabash
- 1915: Fort Wayne Friars
- 1915: Canton Bulldogs
- 1916: Detroit Heralds
- 1916: Massillon Tigers
- Position: Quarterback

Coaching career (HC unless noted)

Football
- 1913–1914: Ripon

Basketball
- 1913–1915: Ripon

Administrative career (AD unless noted)
- 1913–1915: Ripon

Head coaching record
- Overall: 7–5–2 (football); 21–10 (basketball)

Kent Craig "Skeets" Lambert (February 27, 1891 – December 13, 1982) was an American football player and a college football and college basketball coach. He served as the head football coach (1913–1914) and basketball coach (1913–1915) at Ripon College in Ripon, Wisconsin.

Lambert was a graduate of Wabash College in Crawfordsville, Indiana, where he starred as a member of the football team. He was also a member of the basketball, baseball, and track teams at Wabash. Lambert played professionally for several teams in the Ohio League during the 1915 and 1916 seasons.

== Head coaching record ==
=== Football ===
Year	Team	Overall	Conference	Standing	Bowl/playoffs
Ripon Crimson (Independent) (1913–1914)
1913	Ripon	3–2–1			
1914	Ripon	4–3–1			
Ripon:		7–5–2			
Total:		7–5–2			
