= Linda Lambert =

American academic and author

Linda G. Lambert
- Born: Chicago, Illinois
- Occupations: Academic and an author

Academic background
- Education: B.A. M.A. Ed.D.
- Alma mater: Washburn University; University of San Francisco

Linda G. Lambert is an American academic and an author. She is a professor emeritus at California State University, East Bay.

Lambert is most known for her work connecting the domains of leadership and literature, with a primary emphasis on the concepts of constructivist leadership, leadership capacity, liberation and literature. Her authored works include The Constructivist Leader (1st and 2nd editions), which also received the National Book Award from the NCSD in 1997. Her works have been translated into Arabic, Chinese, Hebrew, Lithuanian, and Malay, and they have been published in academic journals, including the Journal of Educational Change and the Canadian Journal of Educational Administration and Policy.

== Education ==
Lambert earned her B.A. from Washburn University in 1966. In 1978, she completed her M.A. in Educational Administration. Later, in 1983, she obtained her Doctor of Education degree from the University of San Francisco in Organization and Leadership.

== Career ==
Between 1966 and 1975, she served as a secondary school teacher in junior and senior high schools. From 1962 to 1965, then again in 1968, she worked as a district court investigator and probation officer in Kansas and Colorado. From 1977 to 1980, she directed the Reform in Intermediate and Secondary Education project while concurrently acting as the curriculum coordinator in Castro Valley from 1978 to 1980. Following this, she assumed the position of principal at San Jose Middle School in Marin County, California. During a brief period from 1986 to 1987, she served as the director of professional development at the Marin County Office of Education. Subsequently, she transitioned to academia, serving as a professor in the Department of Education Leadership at California State University East Bay from 1987 to 1999. Throughout her tenure at the university, she held additional roles including department chair during two terms (1991–93 and 1995–97) and director of the Center for Educational Leadership from 1995 to 1998. She also served as the Staff Development Director sponsored by the U.S. State Department and Egyptian Ministry of Education from 1989 to 1991. Since 1992, she has served as a Consultant in leadership, alongside her position as professor emeritus at California State University East Bay, a title she has held since 1998.

== Works ==
In 1995, Lambert was the lead author of The Constructivist Leader. The book provides educational leaders with a framework for reciprocal, purposeful learning within a community, emphasizing constructivist leadership principles, updated theory, strategies for implementing standards-based reform and authentic assessment, and addressing issues of equity, diversity, and multiculturalism. Her 1997 book Who Will Save Our Schools?: Teachers as Constructivist Leaders offered a synthesis of teaching, learning, and leading principles, proposing innovative strategies for school reform. In 2002, a second edition of The Constructivist Leader was published.

While exploring the impact of leadership on student learning through stories of three schools of varying leadership capacities, her publication titled Building Leadership Capacity in Schools offered a new framework for building organizational and human capacities and improving educational outcomes. Moreover, in 2003, she co-authored a book titled Building Leadership Capacity for School Improvement with Alma Haris. Her books emphasized the importance of maximizing leadership capabilities at all levels within schools to sustain and enhance improvement efforts. In 2003, she wrote the book Lasting School Improvement.

Lambert's 2016 publication Liberating Leadership Capacity: Pathways to Educational Wisdom explored the evolution of leadership in education. The book also advocated for educators to become the primary designers of their own and their students' learning through constructivist principles. In her review of the book, Arthur L. Costa, said "In Liberating Leadership Capacity, a compelling driving concept is that 'leadership capacities are present in the room'. The authors describe organizational conditions that promote skillful dialogue, continual learning, building trust, and sharing a common vision among members. In such schools teachers become the leaders of learning and students become the leaders of the future". She also co-authored the book Women's Ways of Leading with Mary E. Gardner. The book explored a new paradigm of leadership based on values, self-awareness, and community, arguing for the importance of qualities traditionally associated with women in shaping a more enlightened and inclusive world. Moreover, she also authored The Cairo Codex, the first novel in the Justine Trilogy. The novel followed anthropologist Justine Jenner's journey through ancient and present-day Egypt as she uncovers an ancient codex that threatens to challenge the foundations of major world religions amidst political turmoil and personal discovery. The second novel in the trilogy, The Italian Letters, was set in Italy and the third novel, A Rapture of Ravens: Awakening in Taos was set in Taos, New Mexico.

== Research ==
Lambert's research explored and drew conclusions in multiple areas: teacher leadership in professional development schools; adult learning among policy makers, researchers and staff developers; high leadership capacity schools; shared leadership; and women in leadership. In related research, she discussed the transition from a traditional model of educational leadership with the principal as the sole instructional leader to a collaborative approach involving multiple educators, highlighting the untapped potential of teachers' talents and advocating for sustainable improvements in learning outcomes. In her 2003 paper, she advocated for redefining leadership in education to include teachers as leaders through the concept of constructivist leadership, promoting broad-based participation and skill development among teachers. She also conducted a study on schools with high leadership capacity and those in the process of developing it, analyzing their characteristics, relationships, and patterns contributing to lasting school improvement through effective leadership. Her more recent work has focused on promoting learning and engagement for both students and adults in schools, highlighting the role of effective leadership, collaborative decision-making processes, and district support in sustaining school improvement efforts.

== Personal life ==
Lambert was born in Chicago, Illinois, on June 19th,1939. In 1959 she married James L. Green and had three children with him. In 1981 she married Morgan Dale Lambert. She and her husband reside in Santa Rosa, California.

== Awards and honors ==
- 1996 – Helen Heffernan Award, California Association for Supervision and Curriculum Development
- 1997 – National Book of the Year Award for The Constructivist Leader, National Council on Staff Development
- 1998 – Professor of the Year, California State University, East Bay
- 2013 – Independent Publishers Bronze award for The Cairo Codex
- 2013 – The Nautilus Silver Award for The Cairo Codex
- 2013 – Best Books of America finalist for The Cairo Codex
- 2023 – Woman Icon in Leadership, San Diego, California

== Bibliography ==
=== Books ===
- The Constructivist Leader (1995) ISBN 9780807734629
- Who Will Save Our Schools?: Teachers as Constructivist Leaders (1996) ISBN 9780803964624
- Building Leadership Capacity in Schools (1998) ISBN 9780871203076
- The Constructivist Leader, 2nd edition (2002) ISBN 9780807742532
- Leadership Capacity for Lasting School Improvement (2003) ISBN 9780871207784
- Women's Ways of Leading (2009) ISBN 9781608441129
- The Cairo codex (2013) ISBN 9781933512464
- The Italian Letters (2014) ISBN 9781933512471
- A Rapture of Ravens: Awakening in Taos: A Novel (The Justine Trilogy) (2015) ISBN 9781933512501
- Liberating Leadership Capacity: Pathways to Educational Wisdom (2016) ISBN 9780807757512

=== Selected articles ===
- Lambert, L. (2000). Framing reform for the new millennium: Leadership capacity in schools and districts. Canadian Journal of Educational Administration and Policy, (14).
- Gonzales, S., & Lambert, L. (2001). Teacher leadership in professional development schools: Emerging conceptions, identities, and practices. Journal of School Leadership, 11(1), 6–24.
- Lambert, L. (2002). A framework for shared leadership. Educational leadership, 59(8), 37–40.
- Lambert, L. (2006, September). Lasting leadership: A study of high leadership capacity schools. In The Educational Forum (Vol. 70, No. 3, pp. 238–254). Taylor & Francis Group.
- Lambert, L. G. (2007). Lasting leadership: Toward sustainable school improvement. Journal of Educational Change, 8, 311–322.
- Lambert, L. (2018). How to build leadership capacity. In Thinking about schools (pp. 201–204). Routledge.
