= Stephen Lambert (editor) =

American television editor

Stephen Lambert is an American television editor.

Lambert worked for the series Ocean Mysteries with Jeff Corwin as a camera operator and associate producer. The series received a Daytime Emmy Award in the category Outstanding Travel Program in 2014.

In 2015, Lambert was nominated for a Daytime Emmy Award in the category Outstanding Single Camera Editing for his work on the series The Henry Ford's Innovation Nation with Mo Rocca.

He has worked in entertainment television since 2007.

== Personal life ==
Lambert attended Lewis-Palmer High School in Monument, Colorado.

Lambert majored in Film at the University of Colorado at Denver in Denver, Colorado. He also attended the Colorado Film School in Denver.
