= Boyton, Wiltshire =

Village in Wiltshire, England

Coordinates: 51.156°N 2.070°W

Boyton
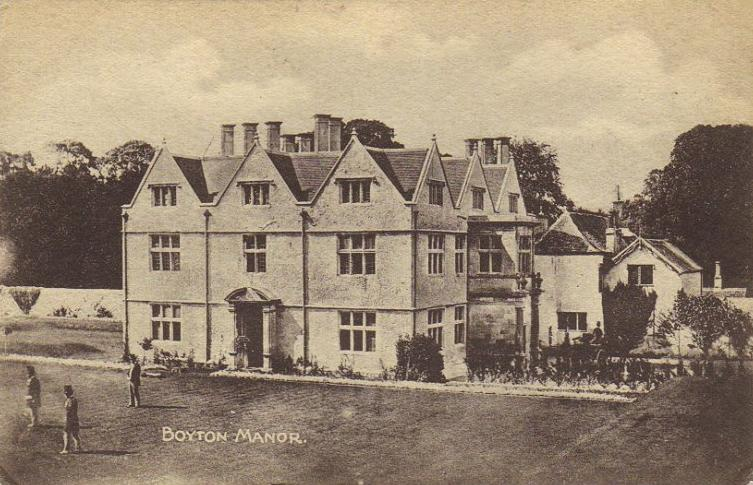
- Boyton Manor, c. 1910, briefly the country house of Prince Leopold, Duke of Albany

- Location within Wiltshire
- Population: 241 (in 2021)
- OS grid reference: ST952396
- Civil parish: Boyton
- Unitary authority: Wiltshire
- Ceremonial county: Wiltshire
- Region: South West
- Country: England
- Sovereign state: United Kingdom
- Post town: Warminster
- Postcode district: BA12
- Dialling code: 01985
- Police: Wiltshire
- Fire: Dorset and Wiltshire
- Ambulance: South Western
- UK Parliament: South West Wiltshire
- Website: Parish Council

Boyton is a village and civil parish in Wiltshire, England. It lies in the Wylye Valley within Salisbury Plain, about 6 miles (10 km) south-east of Warminster and 13 miles (21 km) north-west of Salisbury. The parish includes the village of Corton.

The A36 Salisbury-Warminster road passes 0.6 miles (1 km) north of the villages. The parish is on the right (south) bank of the Wylye, opposite Upton Lovell (near Corton) and Codford St Peter (near Boyton). Its area extends south-west to the higher ground of Corton Down, Boyton Down and Rowdean Hill. In the far south is the Great Ridge Wood, which lies mostly within Boyton and covers about a quarter of the parish.

== History ==
Prehistoric sites in the parish include Corton Long Barrow. The 1086 Domesday Book recorded 17 households at Boyton and six at Corton.

The name Boyton derives from the Old English Boiatūn meaning 'Boia's settlement', or 'settlement of the boy'.

In the thirteenth century, there was a castle in the village. An occupant of the castle was Hugh Giffard and his wife Sibyl, who was the daughter and co-heiress of Walter de Cormeilles. Hugh was father of the Walter Giffard who became Archbishop of York and Chancellor of England. Another son was Godfrey Giffard, Bishop of Worcester and himself also Chancellor of England.

Cortington Manor, near Corton on the Boyton road, dates from the late 17th century.

The 1841 census recorded a population of 305 at Corton and 55 at Boyton; after peaking at 410 in 1860, the population of the parish declined considerably.

The National Gazetteer of Great Britain and Ireland (1868) described Boyton as follows:

BOYTON, a parish in the hundred of Heytesbury, in the county of Wilts, 3 miles to the S.E. of Heytesbury, its post town, and 7 from Warminster. The Salisbury branch of the Great Western Railway passes near it. The parish is situated on the south side of the river Wylye, a branch of the Nadder, and contains the hamlet of Corton. The living is a rectory in the diocese of Salisbury, of the value of £549, in the patronage of the President and Fellows of Magdalen College, Oxford. The church, which is dedicated to St Mary, is a good specimen of early English architecture, and has been recently restored. It was erected in 1301, and contains a fine circular window and an ancient font. There are some small charitable endowments. Boyton House, the old seat of the Lamberts, was built in 1618. CORTON, (or Cortington), a township in the parish of Boyton, hundred of Heytesbury, in the county of Wilts, 1 mile S. of Heytesbury, and 1 N.W. of Boyton. It belongs to the Lambert family.

The Salisbury branch line was built through the Wylye valley, opening in 1856. Codford station was a short distance north of Boyton village; it closed to passengers in 1955 when local services were withdrawn, although the line continues in use as part of the Wessex Main Line.

== Religious sites ==
=== Parish church ===
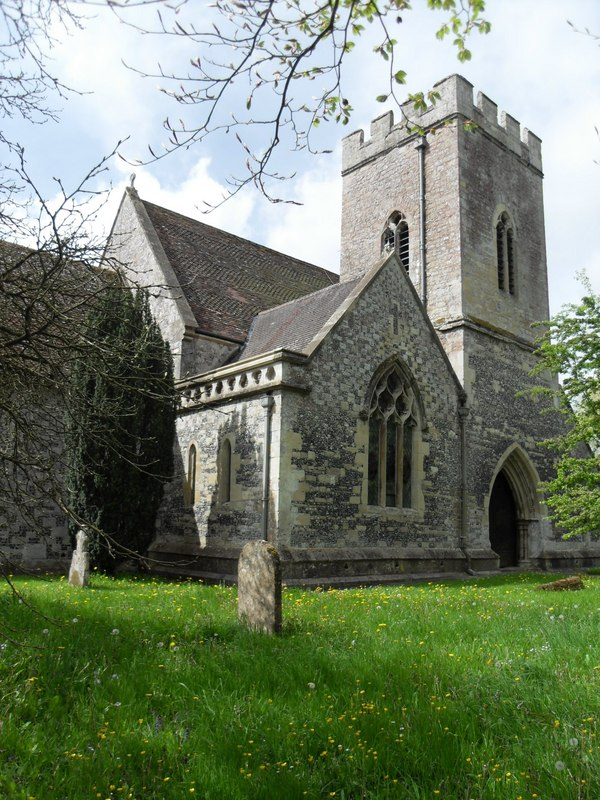
St Mary's Church

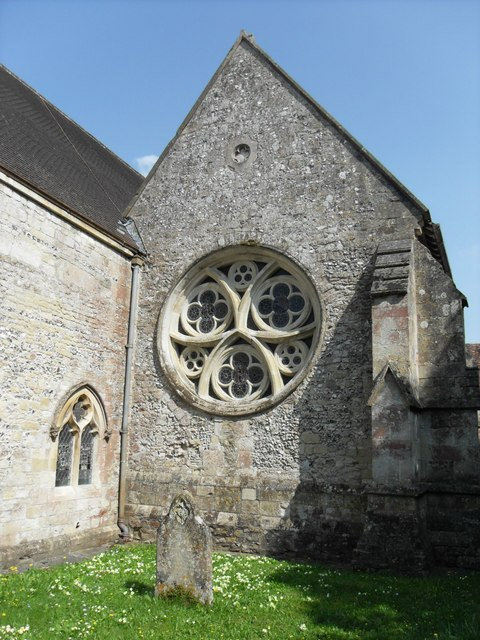
13th-century window, St Mary's, south chapel

The parish church of the Blessed Mary is a Grade I listed building, notable for two fine windows in its south chapel. It is built in flint and limestone, part chequered, and has a north tower.

There are records of a church at Boyton in the 12th century; the nave, chancel and south chapel are from the late 13th century. The north transept was added in the 14th century and the two-stage tower in the 15th; the entrance is under the tower, through a late 13th-century arch. The whole was thoroughly restored by diocesan architect T.H. Wyatt in 1860: the work included new roofs throughout, and some windows were replaced or moved. Further restoration was carried out in 1956–1960 under the auspices of the rector, Robert Richardson, and his wife (Linetta de Castelvecchio Richardson, professor of Italian) who engaged as architect Oswald Brakspear, son of Harold.

The south Giffard chapel has a fine three-light east window, and its oversized west wheel window is called a tour-de-force by Pevsner; Julian Orbach, expanding Pevsner's description, compares its tracery to the 1260 work in Salisbury Cathedral's cloisters, and notes the local connection to Walter Giffard, Archbishop of York. The glass in both windows was lost when the church fell into disrepair, and was replaced by pieces from elsewhere. The chapel also has a 13th-century sedilia and piscina.

The stone font is 13th-century. Monuments in the church include an effigy of a knight in armour, perhaps Alexander the third Giffard brother, who took part in the Seventh Crusade around 1250, although the design of his armour is c.1320. The organ was installed in 1877 by gift of Prince Leopold. Richardson brought in furnishings from elsewhere, and had many fragments of stained glass installed including some from Salisbury Cathedral. The elaborately carved wooden pulpit was installed in 1964. The tower has a ring of five bells, among them one dated 1681 and another dated 1737.

The benefice was united with Sherrington in 1909, although the parishes remained distinct. A team ministry was established for the area in 1979 and today the parish is part of the Upper Wylye Valley grouping, alongside nine others.

=== Others ===
Corton had a chapel of ease from the 13th to 16th centuries but its exact site is not known. Around 1877 a church named All Saints was built, although it was not consecrated until 1937 as ownership of the site was uncertain. At the consecration service the church was dedicated to 'The Holy Angels'. The church was declared redundant in 1980 and was later sold for residential use.

A baptist chapel was built at Corton in 1828, and enlarged in 1854 and 1914. It closed in 1965 and is now a private house.

The church at Rodden, Somerset (later dedicated to All Saints; some 11 miles (18 km) north-west of Boyton) was in the 13th century made a chapelry of Boyton by the Giffards, who included Rodden manor among their estates. The date this arrangement ended, and Rodden became a separate parish, is unclear. Rodden is described as a chapelry in a correction note to the 1811 Census but the 1831 Census Abstract states the separation occurred in 1784. John Collinson, published in 1791, has Rodden as a chapelry of Boyton. Another source gives the creation date of Rodden ecclesiastical parish as 1802.

== Boyton Manor ==
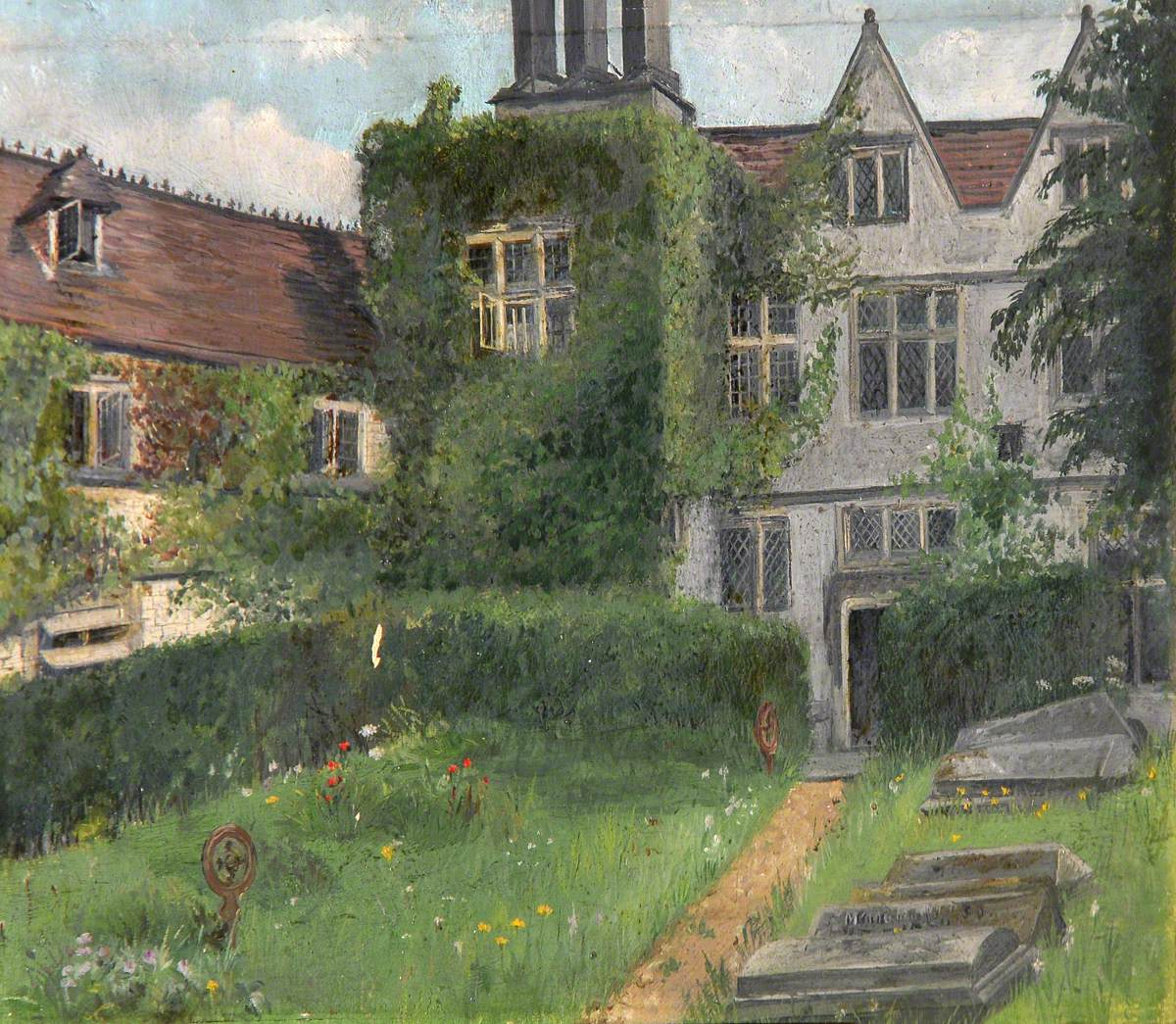
Boyton Manor seen from churchyard, c. 1890

A country house was built next to the church in 1618 for Thomas Lambert, a landowner who later sat briefly in Parliament. Pevsner describes it as "a fine square house, three by three gables". The two-storey central porch has Ionic columns and Corinthian pilasters; Orbach compares it to the porch at Keevil, another Lambert property. Inside are two central staircases, a richly plastered ceiling and some original 17th-century panelling. Staff accommodation, two storeys around a small courtyard, was added at the north-east corner in the 1930s. Ownership continued in the Lambert family until 1935. The house was designated as Grade I listed in 1968.

=== Owners ===
Hugh Giffard of Boyton (d.1246) was Constable of the Tower of London and guardian of the young Edward, son of Henry III. Hugh had two prominent sons: Walter (c.1225–1279) was Lord Chancellor England and Archbishop of York, and Godfrey (c.1235–1302) was Chancellor of the Exchequer, Lord Chancellor and Bishop of Worcester.

The Lambert family became landowners when a London alderman and grocer of that name bought the manor in 1572. His grandson, Thomas (1585–1638) inherited extensive landholdings in Norfolk, where the family originated, and in Wiltshire; he was briefly MP for Hindon. Thomas rebuilt Boyton manor house around 1618.

Edmund Lambert (c.1666–1734) sat in Parliament for Hindon and Salisbury. Lucy, a daughter of a later Edmund Lambert, married John Benett MP (1773–1852) of Pythouse. Their daughter, also Lucy, inherited Pythouse and Boyton, and married Rev. Arthur Fane, younger son of General Sir Henry Fane. Arthur (1809–1872) was later a zealous vicar of Warminster and is buried at Boyton. Their son Edmund Fane (1837–1900) was a diplomat, posted to various countries and knighted in 1899.

From 1876 to 1882, the house was let to Prince Leopold, Duke of Albany, the youngest son of Queen Victoria. When he married, he moved his establishment to Claremont, a house in Surrey, but he is commemorated locally in the name of the Prince Leopold Inn in the neighbouring village of Upton Lovell.

In 1935 Boyton Manor was bought by Sidney Herbert, a Conservative MP. He was created a Baronet, of Boyton, in 1936 but died only three years later.

In the 1950s, the house was bought by Henry Pelham-Clinton-Hope, 9th Duke of Newcastle, and became the family seat, his house at Clumber Park, Nottinghamshire, having been demolished in 1938 and its estate sold in 1946. The house and some of the estate were sold to Barbara, Countess de Brye after the Duke's 1959 divorce from his second wife, Diana, Duchess of Newcastle; Diana continued to live nearby at Cortington Manor until her death in 1997. The Countess (who was separated from her husband) also owned Hanzell Vineyards in California, and on her death in 1991 the properties were inherited by her son Alexander, then aged 17.

== Governance ==
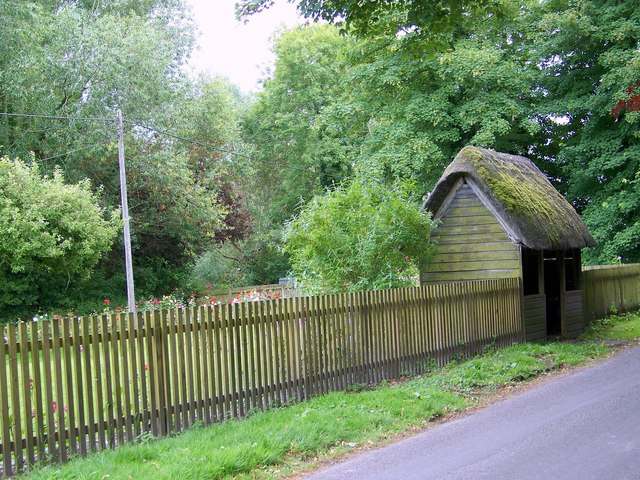
Thatched bus shelter at Boyton

Local government services are provided by Wiltshire Council, based in Trowbridge, some 15 miles to the north. Boyton (with Corton) has its own elected parish council of five members.

The village is represented in Parliament by the MP for South West Wiltshire, Andrew Murrison, and its representative in Wiltshire Council is Christopher Newbury.

== Amenities ==
There is no school in the parish; the nearest primary school is at Codford. A National School was built in 1874 and closed in 1932.

There is a pub at Corton: The Dove Inn.
