= Neil Lambert =

British professor

- Education: University of Toronto; University of Cambridge
- Known for: Bagger–Lambert–Gustavsson action
- Scientific career
- Fields: Theoretical physics
- Workplaces: King's College London

Neil Lambert is a Professor in theoretical physics at King's College London. His research is primarily concerned with supersymmetry, string theory and M-theory.

Lambert graduated from University of Toronto with BSc in mathematics and physics in 1992. He did his graduate studies at Cambridge University.

He was also a staff physicist at CERN from 2010 to 2013.

== Education ==
BSc, University of Toronto (Graduated in 1992).

PhD, Cambridge University (Advisor: Paul Townsend. Graduated in 1996).

== Career ==
From 2000 to 2005, he held a PPARC Advanced Fellowship at King's College London, and later was given a lectureship and later a chair in 2009. He has also held post-doctoral positions at École normale supérieure (Paris) and Rutgers University. From 2010 to 2013, he was a staff physicist at CERN.

== Selected publications ==
- Bagger J, Lambert N. Gauge symmetry and supersymmetry of multiple M2-branes. Physical Review D. 2008 Mar 7;77(6):065008. According to Google Scholar, it has been cited 1307 times.
- Bagger J, Lambert N. Modeling multiple M2-branes. Physical Review D. 2007 Feb 26;75(4):045020. According to Google Scholar, this article has been cited 975 times
- Bagger J, Lambert N. Comments on multiple M2-branes. Journal of High Energy Physics. 2008 Feb 28;2008(02):105.
- Bagger J, Lambert N. Three-algebras and N= 6 Chern-Simons gauge theories. Physical Review D. 2009 Jan 7;79(2):025002.*
- Lambert N, Papageorgakis C, Schmidt-Sommerfeld M. M5-branes, D4-branes and quantum 5D super-Yang-Mills. Journal of High Energy Physics. 2011 Jan 1;2011(1):83.
