= Nicole Lambert =

French illustrator and author (born 1948)

Nichole Lambert
- Born: 8 September 1948 (age 77); France
- Citizenship: French
- Occupations: Illustrator, author
- Years active: 1983–present
- Employer: Madame Figaro
- Known for: Les Triples
- Notable work: Les Triples

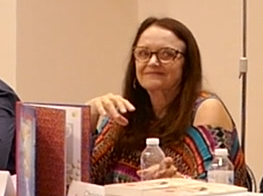

Nichole Lambert (born 8 September 1948) is a French illustrator and author. She is known for the comic strip Les Triples running since 1983 in Madame Figaro.
