= Francis E. Lambert =

American politician and lawyer (1860–1924)

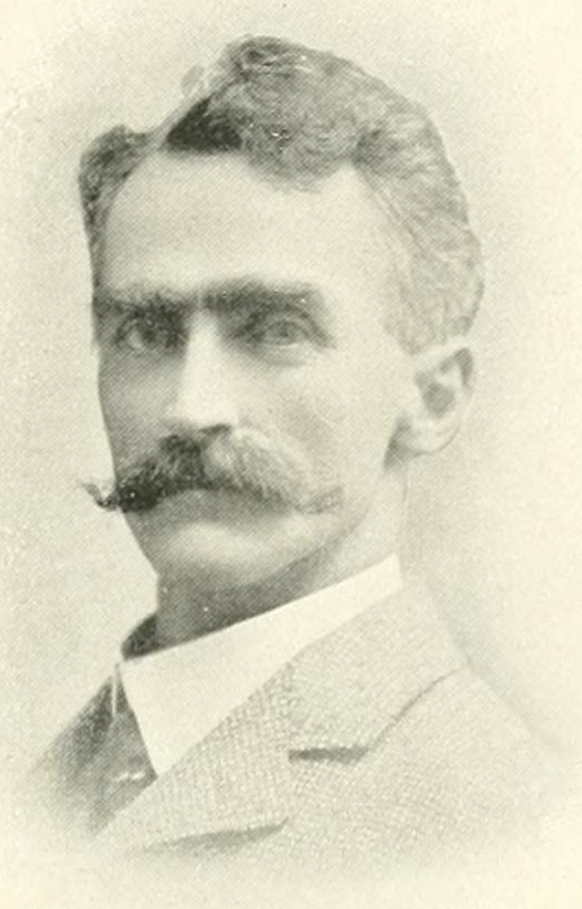
- Lambert in 1901 publication

Member of the Indiana House of Representatives
- In office 1895–1898

Personal details
- Born: June 4, 1860 Warren Township, St. Joseph County, Indiana, U.S.
- Died: June 19, 1924 (aged 64) South Bend, Indiana, U.S.
- Resting place: Riverview Cemetery; South Bend, Indiana, U.S.
- Party: Republican
- Spouse(s): Mary E. Moomaw Blanche Gee (m. 1904)
- Children: 1
- Education: Valparaiso University School of Law
- Occupation: Politician; lawyer; educator

Francis E. Lambert (June 4, 1860 – June 19, 1924) was a politician, lawyer and educator from Indiana. He was a member of the Indiana House of Representatives from 1895 to 1898.

== Early life ==
Francis E. Lambert was born on June 4, 1860, in Warren Township, St. Joseph County, Indiana, to Ellen (née McMullen) and Olver C. Lambert. His father was a farmer and opened a cooper shop in South Bend. His father died in 1872, when Lambert was twelve years old. He attended public schools. He attended the law department at Commercial College at South Bend and was principal of the business department from 1887 to 1891. He attended Valparaiso University School of Law for four years. He also taught school while attending Valparaiso. He was admitted to the bar in 1891.

== Career ==
After graduating, Lambert practiced law with Lytel Jones at Valparaiso for a year. He then practiced law in South Bend. He initially practiced law with F. M. Jackson. He later had a partnership with L. W. Hammond. His partnership with Hammond ended in 1923. He then practiced law alone.

Lambert was a Republican. In 1895, Lambert was elected to the Indiana House of Representatives. He was re-elected in 1897. Lambert introduced the bill that made St. Joseph County a circuit. In October 1898, Lambert was appointed as the referee for bankruptcy in the thirteenth district by Judge John H. Baker. He served in that role for fourteen years.

In 1905, Lambert was the nominee for Mayor of South Bend, but lost to Edward J. Fogarty. Lambert served as republican member of the Board of Works in South Bend under Mayor Charles L. Goetz from 1910 to 1914.

== Personal life ==
Lambert married Mary E. Moomaw of South Bend. They had one daughter, Mildred. He married Blanche Gee on February 24, 1904.

Lambert died of pneumonia following influenza on June 19, 1924, at his home on West Marion Street in South Bend. He was buried at Riverview Cemetery in South Bend.
