= Joan A. Lambert =

American politician

Joan A. Lambert (born July 13, 1946) is an American politician. She was elected as a Republican to the Nevada State Assembly in 1985 and served in seven regular and one special session until 1997, representing part of Washoe County. Lambert also served on the Nevada Tax Commission and resigned in 2016.

She was born in Santa Rosa, California where she received her elementary and high school education. She attended the University of California, Davis, where she received a B.A. in Economics.

Joan is married and they have two sons.
