= Jean-Michel Lambert =

French magistrate and writer

- Born: 1952; France
- Died: July 11, 2017 (aged 64–65); Le Mans, France
- Occupations: Magistrate, writer
- Known for: First investigating judge in the Murder of Grégory Villemin

Jean-Michel Lambert (1952 – 11 July 2017) was a French judge best known as the first investigating magistrate in the high-profile Murder of Grégory Villemin, one of France's most infamous unsolved child murders.

== Death ==
Jean-Michel Lambert was found dead at his home in Le Mans on 11 July 2017, reportedly by suicide. His death occurred shortly after renewed investigative activity in the reopened Villemin case, including modern DNA testing.

== See also ==
- Murder of Grégory Villemin
- Judiciary of France
