= William Lambert (Middlesex cricketer) =

English cricketer (1843–1927)

William Lambert (19 April 1843 – 4 March 1927) was an English first-class cricketer active 1874–98 who played for Middlesex and Glamorgan. He was born in Hatfield, Hertfordshire; died in St Fagans, Cardiff.
