= Jenna Lambert =

Canadian swimmer

Personal information
- Born: February 15, 1991 (age 35) Kingston, Ontario, Canada

Sport
- Sport: Swimming

Jenna Lambert (born February 15, 1991) is a Canadian long-distance swimmer. She became the first female with a physical disability to swim across Lake Ontario when she was fifteen. On 18 July 2006, she entered Lake Ontario in Baird Point, New York and swam 34 kilometres to Lake Ontario Park in Kingston, Ontario and completed her feat on 19 July in 32 hours and 18 minutes.

== Biography ==
Jenna lives in Harrowsmith, Ontario, with her parents Ron and Christine Lambert, and her sister Natalie Lambert, who also is a marathon swimmer, on a hobby farm.

The swim, which was predicted to take 24 hours, was extended when Jenna faced strong winds, and waves that pushed directly against her for the majority of the swim. She accomplished this feat despite not being able to use her legs due to cerebral palsy. She did it to raise money to build a new swimming pool for disabled persons in her native Kingston, Ontario.

Jenna Lambert also won Athlete of the year in 2007. In 2009, Jenna also completed a one-woman ultra-triathlon in an effort to raise further awareness for the Y Knot Abilities Programs. This was a 270 km journey which took her from Belleville to Ottawa in 48 hours and 17 mins. Divided into three parts, the adventure was 1 part swim (30 km) 1 part hand-cycle (230 km) and 1 part wheel in a manual wheelchair (10 km).

Jenna is now focusing on her competitive aspirations and is swimming as a part of Team Canada. Jenna attended Wilfrid Laurier University and she competed at the 2011 Parapan American Games in Guadalajara, Mexico where she finished in eighth position in 100m breaststroke, 100m freestyle and 100m backstroke.
