= Fred B. Lambert =

American historian (1873–1967)

Fred Bussey Lambert
- Born: May 16, 1873; Crown City, Ohio, U.S.
- Died: June 3, 1967; Huntington, West Virginia, U.S.
- Resting place: White Chapel Memorial Gardens, Barboursville, West Virginia
- Education: Morris Harvey College, Marshall University, West Virginia University
- Occupations: Educator, Historian
- Spouse: Nannie Peyton Lambert
- Writing career
- Period: 1840-1940
- Notable work: The Llorrac

Fred Bussey Lambert (May 16, 1873 – June 3, 1967) was a West Virginia educator and regional historian. He is best known for his role in establishing Guyan Valley High School, his production of The Llorrac, and the Fred B. Lambert Collection, an assemblage of regional history housed at Marshall University.

== Early life and education ==
Born in Crown City, Gallia County, Ohio, Lambert was the son of Henry Lambert and the former Sarah Maria Swartwood. He lived in Lawrence County, Ohio in 1880. He was educated at Morris Harvey College in Barboursville, West Virginia, Marshall University at Huntington, West Virginia, and West Virginia University at Morgantown, West Virginia.

== Career ==
=== Teaching ===
Lambert organized several high schools, including Guyan Valley High School, at Pleasant View, West Virginia, in the 1920s. He served for forty-two years as a principal at Guyan Valley High School and Hamlin High School, both in Lincoln County, and at Milton High School in Cabell County. He was superintendent of the former Ceredo-Kenova Independent School District before institution of the countywide school system.

=== Regional historian ===
Lambert, best known for his compilation, The Llorrac (1926), devoted at least sixty years of his life to collecting history, centering his research on the Guyandotte and Mud river sections of southwestern West Virginia, particularly focusing upon Cabell, Wayne, and Lincoln counties. The historical range of his 500 notebook collection, which is housed at James E. Morrow Library at Marshall University, is 1840s to 1940s. The notebooks include genealogical and historical material, interview notes, and photographs.

Lambert's The Llorrac (1926) is the second history compiled about Lincoln County, West Virginia.

== Civic life ==
Lambert was a Mason for over fifty years. He taught the Men's Bible class at Barboursville Methodist Church for many years. He was a member of the Hebron Baptist Church on Tom's Creek, near Barboursville, West Virginia.

== Personal life ==
On March 25, 1896, Lambert married Nannie Peyton in Cabell County, West Virginia. They had eleven children: Don W. Lambert of Dayton, Kentucky; Homer F. Lambert of Huntington, West Virginia; Henry E. Lambert of Wayne, West Virginia; Lt. Col. Charles E. Lambert of Washington, DC; Estelle Hanger of Huntington, West Virginia; Ruth L. Pierson of Huntington, West Virginia; Myrtle Drummond of Huntington, West Virginia; Dolly Byrne of Huntington West Virginia; Pearle L. Hoek of Chicago, Illinois; Dexter Harrington of Wheeling, West Virginia; and Gladys Dorr of Columbus, Ohio. The Lambert family lived in Cabell County in 1910.

In 1918, Lambert lived at Glen White in Raleigh County, West Virginia, where he was employed as a schoolteacher. In a draft registration card for that year, Lambert was described as medium height and medium build, with blue eyes ("weak eyes") and dark brown hair. The Lambert family resettled in Cabell County by 1920.

== Death ==
Lambert died of pneumonia on June 3, 1967, in Huntington, West Virginia. He is interred at White Chapel Memorial Gardens in Barboursville.
