= Thomas Lambert (priest) =

English Anglican priest

Thomas Lambert, D.D. (died 1694) was an English Anglican priest.

He was the second son of Thomas Lambert (1585–1638) of Boyton, Wiltshire, a landowner who sat briefly as an MP.

Lambert was educated at Trinity College, Oxford. He held livings at Sherrington, also in Wiltshire, and at Boyton, and was Archdeacon of Salisbury from 12 June 1674 until his death on 29 December 1694.
