= Ken Lambert =

English footballer

Personal information
- Full name: Kenneth Lambert
- Date of birth: 7 June 1928
- Place of birth: Sheffield, England
- Date of death: 29 June 2002 (aged 74)
- Place of death: Sheffield, England
- Position: Wing half

Youth career
- ?–1950: Ecclesfield

Senior career*
Years	Team	Apps	(Gls)
1950–1952	Barnsley	11	(2)
1952–1953	Gillingham	37	(10)
1953–1954	Swindon Town	30	(5)
1954–1955	Bradford City	19	(4)
1955–?	Matlock Town		
- * Club domestic league appearances and goals

Kenneth Lambert (7 June 1928 – 29 June 2002) was an English professional footballer from Sheffield. His clubs included Barnsley, Swindon Town, Gillingham and Bradford City. He made 97 Football League appearances.
