= Herb Lambert =

New Zealand cricketer

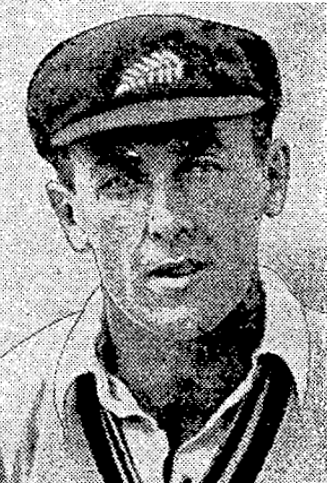
- Lambert in 1932

Personal information
- Full name: Herbert Norman Lambert
- Born: 29 January 1900; Wellington, New Zealand
- Died: 19 July 1984 (aged 84); New Plymouth, New Zealand
- Batting: Right-handed
- Bowling: Right-arm off-spin

Domestic team information
- Years: Team
- 1917/18–1932/33: Wellington

Career statistics
Competition	First-class
Matches	39
Runs scored	1,455
Batting average	22.04
100s/50s	1/6
Top score	107
Balls bowled	3,311
Wickets	70
Bowling average	29.04
5 wickets in innings	1
10 wickets in match	0
Best bowling	6/102
Catches/stumpings	33/–
- Source: CricketArchive, 2 February 2017

Herbert Norman Lambert (29 January 1900 – 19 July 1984) was a New Zealand cricketer who played first-class cricket for Wellington from 1917 to 1933. He appeared twice for the New Zealand cricket team, in the days before New Zealand played Test cricket.

== Cricket career ==
Lambert was an all-rounder, a batsman who could open the batting or bat in the middle order, and a bowler of off-spin. His highest first-class score was 107, the only century in a low-scoring match that Wellington won to clinch the Plunket Shield in 1931-32. His best bowling figures were 6 for 102 in Wellington's 19-run victory over Canterbury in 1929-30.

Lambert's first-class cricket career was interrupted by periods of living outside Wellington. However, in 1922-23, while living in Taranaki, he showed such good form for a combined Taranaki and Wanganui team against the touring MCC team – scoring 66 (in 52 minutes) and 63 in the two-day match when nobody else in the team exceeded 37 – that he was selected to play in the last two of New Zealand's three matches against the MCC. He scored 114 runs in the two matches at an average of 38.00 to lead New Zealand's batting averages. However, his only subsequent appearance for New Zealand was as twelfth man in the Second Test against South Africa in 1931–32. He was the leading scorer in Wellington senior club cricket that season, with 716 runs at an average of 65.09, as well as 35 wickets at 20.51.

In late 1932 Lambert was engaged by the Hastings sub-association of the Hawke's Bay Cricket Association as a coach. He remained there for several seasons, playing occasionally for the Hawke's Bay representative team, which he captained and managed for a Hawke Cup challenge in 1936-37.

== Personal life ==
Lambert married Gladys Muriel Dawe in Wellington in 1920. They separated in 1925, after he was declared bankrupt. He remarried, but his second wife, Fay, died in 1936. He died in New Plymouth in July 1984, aged 84.
