= Sydney Lambert =

New Zealand cricketer

Personal information
- Full name: Sydney Chowne Lambert
- Born: 11 October 1852; At sea
- Died: 30 October 1916 (aged 64); Wellington, New Zealand
- Bowling: Right-arm fast

Domestic team information
- Years: Team
- 1873/74–1874/75: Otago
- Source: ESPNcricinfo, 15 May 2016

Sydney Chowne Lambert (11 October 1852 – 10 October 1916) was a New Zealand sportsman. He played three first-class cricket matches for Otago in the 1873–74 and 1874–75 seasons and umpired cricket in the Wellington area.

Lambert was born at sea in 1852 and was educated at Otago Boys' High School in Dunedin and Christ's College in Christchurch. He played three first-class matches for Otago, two in the 1873–74 season and one the following season. Primarily a bowler, he took three first-class wickets, all of them in a January 1874 fixture against Canterbury for the cost of four runs.

Lambert worked as a government clerk in Wellington, at the time of this death working in the Land and Income Tax Department. He was a prominent lawn bowler in later life. He died suddenly at Wellington in 1916 at the age of 63.
