= John Lambert of Creg Clare =

Irish soldier and Royalist

John Lambert of Creg Clare (fl. c.1610 – c.1669) was an Irish soldier and Royalist.

== Life ==
A native of County Galway a Hiberno-Norman, Lambert is described as "an officer in Lord Clanricarde's Regiment in the Duke of Ormonde's Army in Ireland 1645. Had a lease of Creg Clare from the Earl of Clanricarde in 1669." (O'Regan, p. 40)

According to Patrick Melvin (p. 53), the original Lambert residence, Creg Clare, is north-east of Ardrahan, close to Castle Taylor, Tullira and Roxborough, homes of the Taylor, Martyn and Persse families by the early 18th-century.

Donovan O'Sullivan more fully describes him as the secretary of Ulick Burke, 1st Marquess of Clanricarde in November 1651. In that month, Clanricarde "dispatched his secretary, John Lambert, to Galway to find out exactly the real state of feeling in the town. Lambert's instructions were to put the inhabitants fully au courant with the situation in the kingdom. Having done this, he was to inform them that, since the Jamestown meeting had not been possible, the Lord Deputy now proposed that a Council of prelates, nobility and gentry should be held at Galway or some place near it to review the whole position, consider the possibility of foreign aids, and decide whether Clanricarde could be of any further use to the country;" (pp. 314–315). Donovan O'Sullivan reports that "The mayor and Council of Galway seem to have been impressed with Lambert's statement."

== Family ==
He married twice; firstly in 1649 to Redish, daughter of Thomas Lynch, Mayor of Galway by whom he had;

- Mary Lambert, who married Robert French of Rahasane, Co. Galway.
- Joseph Lambert, whose descendants settled in County Mayo.

Redish Lynch died in the 1650s. Lambert married secondly, on 23 June 1659, Mary Ffrench, who may have been brother to Robert Ffrench of Rahasane, and daughter of Marcus Ffrench of Cahir Dangin and wife Catherine D'arcy. Redish and John Lambert had a son;

- Charles Lambert, ancestor of subsequent Lambert families of County Galway, born c.1660, killed at the Siege of Derry, 1689.

== Disputed ancestry ==
John Lambert has been associated with Major-General John Lambert (1619–1684), claiming descent from his father, Josias of Carlton, Yorkshire (born 1554). However, there is in fact nothing to demonstrate any relationship between the two, beyond the accident of sharing a name. He may instead have been a kinsman of Charles Lambart, 1st Earl of Cavan.

Writing in 1820, James Hardiman included the Lamberts among the "many other families, who ... were equally ancient and respectable, as well from length of residence in the town, as through alliance with the other inhabitants, by whom they were gradually affiliated, and finally considered, without any distinction, as members of the same body" (p. 20) as the Tribes of Galway, the premier families of Galway town in the early 1600s.

== Descendants ==
Melvin remarks that Lambert's "original seat in the county was Cregclare near Ardrahan. Further branches of the family became established at Castle Ellen and Castle Lambert" (located some four miles west and north of Athenry, respectively) "on property acquired from the Blakes and Brownes. The earlier name of Castle Lambert was Aghrim and it was part of the estate of the Blakes of Corbally, which was the original name of Castle Daly."

Notable descendants of John Lambert include:

- Charles Lambert of Creg Clare, Jacobite, killed at the 1689 siege of Derry
- Sarah Lambert, Lady Clanmorris, wife of Charles Barry Bingham, 2nd Baron Clanmorris (married 1816)
- John Walter Henry Lambert of Aggard, Craughwell, J.P., High Sheriff of County Galway, 1855 (1811–99)
- Captain Thomas Eyre Lambert, landlord and assassin target (1819–1920)
- Isabella Lambert Carson (born 1823)
- James Staunton Lambert of Creg Clare, M.P. for Galway (1826–33)
- Ada Constance Lambert, wife of Sir George Moyers, Lord Mayor of Dublin, 1881.
- Nannie Lambert Power O'Donoghue, equestrian, journalist and novelist (1843–1940)
- Edward Carson PC, Pc (Ire), Kt., QC, (1854–1935)
- Edward Martyn, co-founder of The Abbey Theatre, (1859–1924)
- Walter Peter Lambert, Lt. Col., M.C. (born 1891)
- Douglas Martin Hogg, 3rd Viscount Hailsham PC, KC (born 1945)

== Family tree (abbreviated) ==
                  John Lambert of Creg Clare, fl. 1610 – after 1669.
  =Redish Lynch, daughter of Thomas Lynch, Mayor of Galway     =Mary Ffrench, dau of Marcus Ffrench of Cahir Dangin
  |                                                            |
  |_________________________________                           |
  |                                |                           |
  |                                |                           |
  Joseph of Kilmaine, c.1652-90+   Mary Charles Lambert of Creg Clare, k. Derry, 1689.
 =unknown                         =Robert French of Rashane    =Janet Taylor of Ballymacragh (Castle Taylor)
  |                                                            |
  |_____________________                                       |
  |                    |                                 Walter Lambert of Creg Clare
  |                    |                        =Miss Hamilton =Sibella Martyn of Tullira 
  Joseph, fl. 1754.    Francis, alive 1722.     |              |
 =Anne Ruttledge                                |              |__________________________________________
  |                                             |              |      |               |        |         |
  |__________                                   |              |      |               |        |         |
  |         |                                   Charles John Peter, d. 1836. Thomas Belinda Ms. Lambert
  |         |                                                         =Miss Carrol of Ardagh                                  
  William Francis                                                   |
   d.s.p.   =Mercy Ormsby=Rebecca Lindsay     ________________________|__________________
            (issue) (issue)            |                                         |
                                              |                                         |
                                              Walter Peter Lambert of Castle Ellen.     Sabina Lambert
                                              =Ellen Tubbs                              =Thomas Mahon of Belleville, Co. Galway.
                                              |
                       _______________________|______________________________
                       |                                                    | 
                       |                                                    |
                       Peter, 1785–1844.                                    Charles, b. 1804.
                    =Eleanor Seymour     =Maria Louisa Caroll               =Jane Catherine Irwin of Oakfield, County Sligo.
                    |                    |                     |             |
                    |                    |               Stubbs|Lambert.
Lambert.            |
                    Isabella Louisa Maria, 1837–1904 Nannie Lambert Power O'Donoghue, 1843–1940                         
                    =Edward Henry Carson =Henry Jenkins Stavely Bowdler     =William Power O'Donoghue
                    |       
                    |
                    Edward Carson

== See also ==
- Hiberno-Normans
