= Thomas Eyre Lambert =

Thomas Eyre Lambert (25 April 1820 – 1919) was an Irish soldier and landlord.

== Overview ==
Lambert was the son of Walter Lambert and Anne Eyre. He married Sarah Trousdell in August 1850, but died without issue. Lambert gained the rank of captain in the service of the 38th Foot. He was at one time a justice of the peace (J.P.) in County Galway. He was a descendant of John Lambert of Creg Clare. Between 1869 and 1871 he was one of the principals in an attempted murder case which gained national and international attention.

== Eviction of the Barrett family ==
Captain Lambert inherited his father's estate in 1867, at Castle Lambert, a few miles northwest of Athenry. In 1869 he evicted the Barrett family from their farm at Moorepark, close to Castle Lambert. Folklore in the Athenry area relates that during a hunt, a rider asked if Barrett's house was that of Lambert's brother, Thomas. On being told that it was actually the home of a peasant, the hunt members laughed. Shortly after this, the Barretts were evicted, moving to Swangate in Athenry. News reached Peter Barrett, one of the family's older children, who was at the time working as a postman in London.

== The shooting ==
On Sunday evening between 9pm and 10pm, 11 July 1869, Captain Lambert was walking up the avenue of Castle Lambert, returning from dinner at his brother's home in Moorepark. He encountered a man wearing a bowler hat in the shadow of lime trees. When Lambert asked the man to identify himself, the man remained silent, leading Lambert to set his small dog on him. At this the man faced Lambert, pointed a revolver and shot five bullets from no more than twelve yards. He then ran off through a group of trees called "The Rookery". Lambert had been shot twice in the stomach with another bullet in his forehead. If not for his hard hat, the bullet would have likely impacted his brain and killed him. Lambert rose, staggered towards his house and raised the alarm, with the local Royal Irish Constabulary (RIC), sealing off the Athenry area.

Shortly before 10pm, Peter Barrett appeared at Athenry railway station, where he bought a ticket for London. He then proceeded across the road to the Railway Hotel, drawing attention by several requests to members of staff as to what time it was, despite the hotel clock being plainly visible. He was noted as wearing a tall hat. He stepped on the train bound for Dublin. Few policemen were in Athenry, as many had been relocated to Northern Ireland to deal with the usual 12 July disturbances, but sub-constable Hayden was alerted in time to board the train where he noticed Barrett. As he fitted the description given by Captain Lambert, he was arrested and taken off at Woodlawn station, between Athenry and Ballinasloe. The following morning he was identified by Captain Lambert as his attacker.

== Trial of Barrett ==
The trial of Regina versus Barrett was held in Galway in September 1869. Barrett was defended by Isaac Butt, who proceeded to attack the prosecution case. Barrett had been searched but no sign of the revolver. Butt uncovered inconsistencies in Lambert's evidence, and scored a major victory when he determined that Lambert (a magistrate) had suppressed some crucial facts. His efforts were successful in undermining Lambert's credibility. The jury was unable to deliver a verdict, leading to a second trial being held in Dublin. By this stage, the media had given events detailed coverage and made the case front-page news, becoming a high-profile example of the Irish question, concerning both tenant's rights and Home Rule. For a second time, the jury could not give a unanimous verdict, leading to all charges against Barrett been dismissed.

== Other shootings ==
In the mid-to-late 1800s, County Galway had an especially bad reputation concerning land disputes. Some incidents of the times included:

- James Connors, shot March 1881.
- Peter Dempsey, shot May 1881.
- Maumtrasna murders of 1882, in which nine members of the Joyce family were shot to death.
- John Henry Blake, shot June 1882.
