= James Lambert (ski jumper) =

British former ski jumper (born 1965)

James Lambert (born 21 July 1965) is a British former ski jumper who works for UK Channel 4 TV program The Jump. Lambert had most success in masters competitions. His longest jump was at the Masters World Championships in Switzerland in 2009 - only four athletes representing Great Britain have jumped further. He is one of the few British ski jumpers to win an international event - he was first in the age 45-49 Classification contest in Roznov, Czechia on 29 September 2012.

== Early life and education ==
Lambert was born in Rochdale, United Kingdom in 1965. He learned to ski at 18 years old, when he left UK in 1984 and moved to Garmisch-Partenkirchen, Germany. He worked as a mountain guide and ski teacher, and discovered ski jumping. He trained at the Garmish Partenkirchen Olympic Stadium until reaching the level to qualify for international competition.

== Skiing career ==
Lambert competed for Britain throughout the 1990s to 2011. He was five times British Champion and represented Great Britain in the FIS Nordic World Ski Championships 2011 held in Oslo at the age of 46. He competed in the Nordic combined and jumped 57m, putting him in last place ahead of the 10 km ski race and several minutes behind all the other competitors and he was given a DNF (did not finish) classification.

He ended his competitive ski jumping career in 2012.

Lambert was President for the Masters Ski Jumping (IMC - International Masters World Championships) from 2009 until 2012.

== Television career ==
Lambert started his television career at the World Championships in Oslo in 2011 where he commentated live for Swedish Eurosport. In 2014, he joined the Channel 4 team as ski jumping instructor for The Jump a British television series that follows celebrities as they try to master various winter sports.
