= Paul Lambert (water polo) =

French water polo player (1908–1996)

Personal information
- Nationality: French
- Born: 8 January 1908
- Died: 28 October 1996 (aged 88)

Sport
- Sport: Water polo
National team
- Years: Team
- –: France

Paul Lambert (8 January 1908 – 28 October 1996) was a French water polo player who competed in the 1936 Summer Olympics. He was part of the French team which finished fourth in the 1936 tournament. He played all seven matches.
