= Frank Lambert (curator) =

British art gallery curator (1884–1973)

Frank Lambert, CBE FBA (1884 – 13 January 1973) was a museum and art gallery curator. After appointments in London, Stoke-on-Trent and Leeds he was director of the Walker Art Gallery, Liverpool for twenty years, from 1932.

== Life and career ==
Lambert was born in London and educated at St Olave's Grammar School and Christ's College, Cambridge. He studied Greek and Roman art under Sir Charles Walton, Slade Professor of Fine Art.

His first professional appointment (1908–1924) was assistant curator to the Guildhall Museum, London. This appointment was interrupted by his wartime service in the army. From 1924 to 1927 he was curator of the Stoke-on-Trent Art Gallery, and from 1927 to 1931 he was director of the Leeds City Art Gallery. During his time at Leeds 166 works were added to the collection, and Lambert edited and published an illustrated catalogue of the permanent collection.

In 1931 Lambert was appointed director of the Walker Art Gallery, Liverpool in succession to A. G. Quigley. His tenure in Liverpool coincided with the acquisition, through several bequests, of a large extension to the existing exhibition space, giving the gallery six new rooms and bringing it to a size comparable with that of the Royal Academy in London. During the Second World War, Lambert arranged for the gallery to host lunchtime concerts on the lines pioneered by Myra Hess at the National Gallery in London.

At the Walker, Lambert instituted a vigorous campaign of acquisitions. Until his time the gallery had owned few pre-Victorian paintings, and under him it acquired works by Gainsborough, Stubbs, Allan Ramsay and Zoffany, as well as works by twentieth-century artists including Sickert, Augustus John, Harold Gilman and Wilson Steer.

Lambert was well known as a lecturer, first at London University (1920–24) and from 1927 to 1931 at Leeds University. In 1937–38 he was Sydney Jones Lecturer in Art at Liverpool University. He defended modern art against attacks by anti-modernists, maintaining, "There is no norm in contemporary art because there is no norm in the art and the science of living."

Lambert served as president of the Museums Association from 1946 to 1948, in which year he was appointed CBE. He retired in 1952 and died at the age of 88.
