= Peter Lambert (brigadier) =

Australian public servant and military officer

- Occupations: Soldier and Public Servant
- Known for: Head of Capability Systems, Chief of Research Services Division

Brigadier Peter Lambert is an Australian public servant and former senior officer in the Australian Army.

Lambert had a lengthy career with the Australian Defence Force, where he rose to the rank of brigadier, and later worked with the Defence Materiel Organisation (DMO). In January 2013 he joined the Defence Science and Technology Organisation (DSTO) where he was Deputy Chief Defence Scientist (Corporate) and CIO. Following restructures and name changes, he became Chief of Research Services Division of the Defence Science and Technology Group.
