= Jack Walter Lambert =

Jack Walter Lambert CBE (1917–1986) was an English arts journalist, editor and broadcaster.

== Selected publications ==
- Cornwall. Penguin, 1939.
- New English Dramatists 3. Penguin, 1960. (Editor)
- New English Dramatists 3. Penguin, 1961. (Editor)
- New English Dramatists 4. Penguin, 1962. (Editor)
- The Bodley Head Saki. Bodley Head, London, 1963. (Editor)
- Drama in Britain, 1964-73. 1974.
- The Bodley Head, 1887-1987. The Bodley Head, London, 1987. (completed by Michael Ratcliffe)
