= Brian Lambert (Australian footballer) =

Australian rules footballer

Personal information
- Full name: Brian Francis Lambert
- Born: 10 October 1930
- Died: 26 December 2017 (aged 87)
- Original team: Dandenong
- Height: 166 cm (5 ft 5 in)
- Weight: 66 kg (146 lb)

Playing career^{1}
Years	Club	Games (Goals)
1949	Hawthorn	5 (5)
- ^{1} Playing statistics correct to the end of 1949.

Brian Lambert (10 October 1930 – 26 December 2017) was an Australian rules footballer who played with Hawthorn in the Victorian Football League (VFL).
