= Eric Lambert (English footballer) =

English footballer (1920–1979)

Personal information
- Full name: Eric Victor Lambert
- Date of birth: 4 August 1920
- Place of birth: Derby, England
- Date of death: 1979 (aged 58–59)
- Place of death: Derby, England
- Position: Full back

Senior career*
Years	Team	Apps	(Gls)
–1944	Nottingham Forest	0	(0)
1944–1946	Derby County	0	(0)
1946	Hartlepools United	16	(0)
- * Club domestic league appearances and goals

Eric Victor Lambert (4 August 1920 – 1979) was an English professional footballer who played in the Football League for Hartlepools United as a full back.

== Career statistics ==
Appearances and goals by club, season and competition
Club	Season	League			FA Cup		Total	
Club	Season	Division	Apps	Goals	Apps	Goals	Apps	Goals
Hartlepools United	1946–47	Third Division North	16	0	2	0	18	0
Career total			16	0	2	0	18	0
