= Franklin T. Lambert =

American historian and former footballer

Franklin T. Lambert (born April 17, 1943) is a professor of history at Purdue University, Indiana, United States. He received his PhD from Northwestern University, Illinois, in 1990 and has special interests in American Colonial and Revolutionary Era history. Before earning his PhD he was also a punter for the Pittsburgh Steelers from 1965 to 1966.

== Football career ==
Frank Lambert
No. 46
- Position: Punter

Personal information
- Born: April 17, 1943 (age 83); Hattiesburg, Mississippi, U.S.
- Listed height: 6 ft 3 in (1.91 m)
- Listed weight: 200 lb (91 kg)

Career information
- High school: Hattiesburg (MS)
- College: Mississippi
- NFL draft: 1965: 5th round, 62nd overall pick
- AFL draft: 1965: 10th round, 76 (by the New York Jets)th overall pick

Career history
- Pittsburgh Steelers (1965–1966)

Awards and highlights
- Sugar Bowl champion (1962)

Career NFL statistics
- Punts: 156
- Punting yards: 6,802
- Stats at Pro Football Reference

Lambert was a professional football punter who played two seasons with the Pittsburgh Steelers of the National Football League (NFL). He had played college football at the University of Mississippi for the Ole Miss Rebels.

== Bibliography ==
=== Books ===
- Frank Lambert (1994). "Pedlar in Divinity": George Whitefield and the Transatlantic Revivals, 1737-1770. Princeton University Press. ISBN 978-0-691-03296-2.
- Frank Lambert (1999). Inventing the Great Awakening. Princeton University Press. ISBN 978-0-691-04379-1.
- Frank Lambert (2005). James Habersham: Loyalty, Politics, And Commerce in Colonial Georgia. University of Georgia Press. ISBN 978-0-8203-2539-2.
- Frank Lambert (2005). The Barbary Wars: American Independence in the Atlantic World. Macmillan. ISBN 978-0-8090-9533-9.
- Frank Lambert (2006). The Founding Fathers and the Place of Religion in America. Princeton University Press. ISBN 978-0-691-12602-9.
- Frank Lambert (2008). Religion in American Politics. Princeton Univ. ISBN 978-0-691-12833-7.
- Frank Lambert (2009). The Battle of Ole Miss: Civil Rights v. States' Rights. Oxford University Press. ISBN 978-0-19-538042-2.
- Frank Lambert (2014). Separation of Church and State: Founding Principle of Religious Liberty. Mercer University Press. ISBN 978-0-881-46477-1.

=== Book chapters and journal articles ===
- Lambert, Frank (January 2002). "'I saw the book talk': slave readings of the first Great Awakening". The Journal of African American History. 87: 12–25. doi:10.1086/JAAHv87n1p12. S2CID 142221704.
- Frank Lambert (2004). "Evangelical Revivals as Commicative Spheres in Colonial Era". In Norbert Finzsch; Ursula Lehmkuhl (eds.). Atlantic communications: the media in American and German history from the seventeenth to the twentieth century. Berg. ISBN 978-1-85973-679-1.
- Franklin T. Lambert (2011). ""Virginia's Religious Revolution: From Established Monopoly to Free Marketplace". In Joseph War (ed.). Britain and the American South. Univ. Press of Mississippi. ISBN 978-1-60473-600-7.

=== Encyclopedia articles ===
- The Great Awakening, in Encyclopedia of the Enlightenment, 4 vols. Oxford University Press, 2003. ed. by Alan Charles Kors.
