= Sir John Lambert, 1st Baronet =

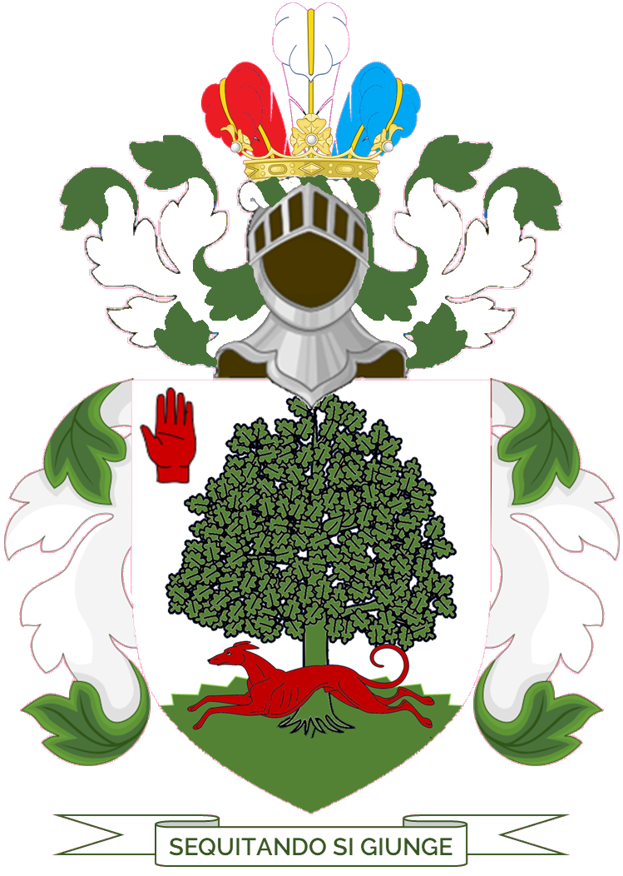
- Crest: Out of a ducal coronet Or three ostrich feathers the dexter feather Gules the centre Argent and the sinister Azure
- Shield: Argent on a mount an oak-tree Vert and a greyhound courant Gules.
- Motto: Sequitando Si Giunge (By Pursuing One Attains)

Sir John Lambert, 1st Baronet (1666 – 4 February 1723) of London, was a French-born English merchant.

== Life ==
He was the eldest son of Jean Lambert (d. 1702), a merchant of Saint-Martin-de-Ré, Île de Ré, Aunis, France, by Marie Le Fevre. A Protestant, he was educated in England at Camberwell and became wealthy through trade. He was one of the directors of the South Sea Company. He was knighted in or after September 1710, when he had advanced £400,000 or more to the British Government.

On the recommendation of Robert Harley, Chancellor of the Exchequer, he was created a baronet on 16 February 1711.

== Family and succession ==
He married, in or before 1690, Madeleine, daughter of Benjamin Bruzelin, who was a merchant in Rouen. Their first son, also called John, was born on 22 March 1690.

The first baronet died on 4 February 1723, and he was succeeded by his eldest son, John. Madeleine died in Clarges Street, Piccadilly, in April 1737, aged about 70. The second baronet married Anne Holmes, whose father Tempest Holmes was a Commissioner of the Victualling Office. The second baronet died aged 82 on 4 September 1772, and was in turn succeeded by his eldest son John (11 October 1728 – 21 May 1799), the third of the Lambert baronets of that name.

Baronetage of Great Britain
| New creation | Baronet (of London); 1711–1723 | Succeeded by John Lambert |
