= Paul Lambert (journalist) =

British television producer (died 2020)

Paul Lambert (1958/59 – 8 April 2020), nicknamed "Gobby", was a British television journalist, producer and communications director.

== Biography ==
Lambert started work as an electrician. He then moved into broadcasting and became a BBC field producer for news and politics programmes. He became well known among journalists and politicians for shouting pointed questions at government ministers and others in Downing Street, often heard in the background of news broadcasts. He said "The point really is to fill in the pieces of the TV bulletin piece that you haven't got pictures to fill in. You know someone isn't going to say anything. You just need something to happen."

His House of Commons pass was removed after he filmed a protester attacking Rupert Murdoch with shaving foam within the Parliament building in 2011, in contravention of their rules. The ban led to protests by journalists.

Lambert left the BBC in 2014 and became communications director for the UK Independence Party.

He died in 2020, aged 61. His daughter said that he had taken his own life.
