= Thomas Scott Lambert =

American physician (1819–1897)

- Born: May 22, 1819; Wakefield, Massachusetts, U.S.
- Died: March 31, 1897 (aged 77)
- Other names: T S Lambert; T.S. Lambert
- Education: Castleton, Vermont
- Occupations: Physician and author

Thomas Scott Lambert (May 22, 1819 - March 31, 1897) was an American physician. Lambert was born

in Wakefield, Massachusetts and was educated in medicine at Castleton, Vermont, where he took his M. D. in 1845. He lectured extensively on medical and educational themes and wrote a number of books. Dr. Lambert died from pneumonia in 1897, aged 78.

== Works (selected) ==
- Hygienic Physiology (1852, Sanborn and Carter)
- Systematic Human Physiology, Anatomy and Hygiene: Second Edition
- On Alcohol: A Course of Six Cantor Lectures Delivered Before the Society of Arts (with Sir Benjamin Ward Richardson)
- Human Anatomy, Physiology And Hygiene
- A Description of the Newly-Invented Elastic Tourniquet, for the Use of Armies and Employment in Civil Life: Its Uses and Applications, With Remarks on ... Gunshot and Other Wounds
- Sources of longevity : its indications and practical applications : part I, part II. 1869
- Longevity, Part 2 (with John Hoskins Griscom)
- Bathing and the Bath, Simple and Medicated: Its History, Effect and Mode of Application, with a Particular Description of the Patent Toilet Bath
