= Paul Lambert (TV personality) =

Paul Anthony Lambert
- Born: March 9, 1970 (age 55); Birmingham, Alabama
- Occupation: Technology Consultant
- Spouse(s): Tracy Lambert (née Sanders), born July 27, 1972, couple married April 4th, 1991
- Website: www.VoteLambert.org

Paul Anthony Lambert (born March 9, 1970), an Alabama native, is best known as "Engineer Ed" in the children's television show, "Fun Junction Depot". Currently, he works as technology consultant and small business owner, specializing in mobile television production.

Lambert, who resides in Maylene, AL, is married to Tracy Sanders Lambert, of Birmingham, Alabama, and is the father of 14 children.

Lambert announced plans to run in the 2010 election cycle for Alabama's 6th congressional district, US House of Representatives, against incumbent Spencer Bachus.

== Personal life ==
Born and raised in Birmingham, Alabama, Lambert is the oldest child of Phillip Lambert and Opal Blackmon Lambert. He has one sibling, a younger brother, Dennis Lambert.

== Political aspirations ==
In April 2009, Lambert announced his candidacy to run as a Republican for Alabama's Sixth Congressional District seat in the United States House of Representatives against nine-term incumbent Republican Spencer Bachus.
