= Louis Lambert (footballer) =

Belgian footballer (1931–2024)

Personal information
- Full name: Ludovicus Lambert
- Date of birth: 13 December 1931
- Place of birth: Brasschaat, Belgium
- Date of death: 2 February 2024 (aged 92)
- Positions: Forward; defender

Senior career*
Years	Team	Apps	(Gls)
1950–1961	Royal Antwerp	144	(6)
Total		144	(6)

International career
1957	Belgium	0	(0)
- * Club domestic league appearances and goals

Ludovicus "Louis" Lambert (13 December 1931 – 2 February 2024) was a Belgian footballer. He spent his career with Royal Antwerp F.C., with whom he won a Belgian First Division championship. He started his career as a forward before switching to defender.

== Biography ==
Born in Brasschaat on 13 December 1931, Lambert attended school in Antwerp before joining Royal Antwerp in 1950. He played in his first match at the age of 19 on 11 March 1951 against Liège. With his team's prolific attack, he struggled to establish himself and rarely played in his first three years in the First Division. He received more playing time in the 1953–54 season, appearing in 17 matches and scoring three goals. He then mainly watched from the sidelines as his team won the 1955 Belgian Cup. He played in every match when the team won the 1956–57 Belgian First Division and played in the 1958 European Cup round of 16 game, a loss to two-time defending champion Real Madrid.

In December 1957, Lambert was called up to the Belgian national team, a friendly match against Turkey, but he stayed on the substitutes' bench the entire contest. He left Royal Antwerp after the 1961 season and joined RAEC Mons, which had just been promoted to the Belgian Third Division. He then played for several clubs in lower divisions and the Belgian Provincial Leagues.

Lambert died on 2 February 2024, at the age of 92.
