= Thomas Lambert (died 1638) =

English landowner

Thomas Lambert (1585–1638) was an English landowner who briefly sat in the House of Commons from 1625 to 1626.

Lambert was the son of Edward Lambert (d.1609) of Boyton, Wiltshire. He matriculated at Queen's College, Oxford on 19 October 1604, aged 17. In 1625, Lambert was elected as one of the two members of parliament for Hindon, and was re-elected for Hindon in 1626.

In or before 1613 he married Anne (d.1649), daughter of Walter Dunch, a barrister of Gray's Inn and Avebury. They had five sons and two daughters. The second son, also Thomas (d.1694) took holy orders and became Archdeacon of Salisbury.

Lambert had already rebuilt the manor house at Boyton by the time he took ownership on his mother's death in 1619, his elder brother having predeceased him. In 1621 his brother-in-law William Dunch conveyed Avebury manor to him.

Lambert died at Boyton on 30 August 1638 and was buried in the parish church. At the time of his death he held six manors as well as other properties, in Wiltshire and Norfolk.

Parliament of England
Preceded by Lawrence Hyde; Matthew Davies	Member of Parliament for Hindon; 1626; With: Sir Thomas Thynne	Succeeded by Sir Thomas Thynne; Lawrence Hyde
