= Paul Lambert (bishop) =

American bishop (born 1950)

Paul Emil Lambert (born May 19, 1950) is a retired suffragan bishop of the Episcopal Diocese of Dallas. He was consecrated on July 12, 2008, and retired in May 2016.

== See also ==
- List of Episcopal bishops of the United States
- List of bishops of the Episcopal Church in the United States of America
