= Lambert baronets =

Title in the Baronetage of Great Britain

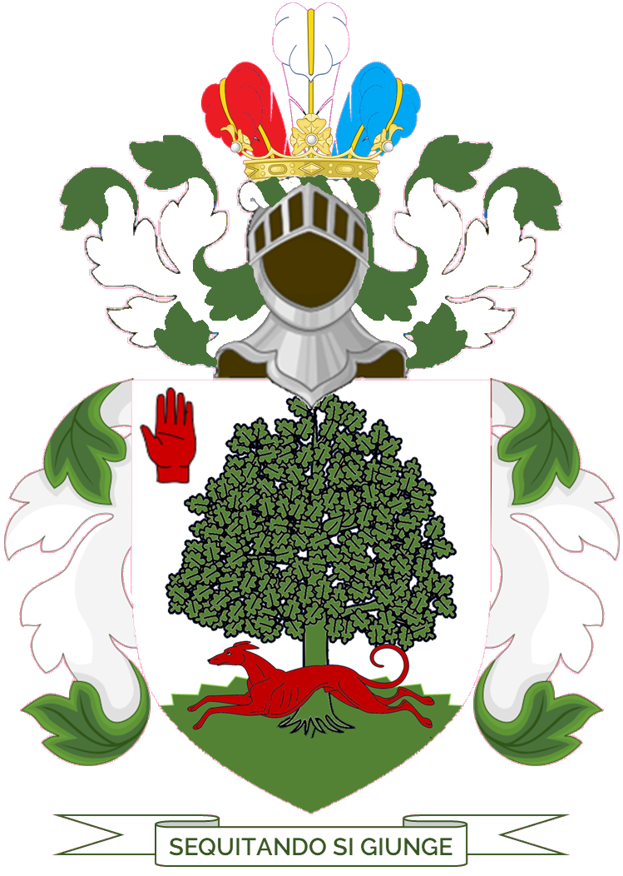
- Crest: Out of a ducal coronet Or three ostrich feathers the dexter feather Gules the centre Argent and the sinister Azure
- Shield: Argent on a mount an oak-tree Vert and a greyhound courant Gules.
- Motto: Sequitando Si Giunge (By Pursuing One Attains)

The Lambert baronetcy, of London, is a title in the Baronetage of Great Britain. It was created on 16 February 1711 for John Lambert, a French-born merchant who had settled in England. He was a Director of the South Sea Company and was created a Baronet for supplying the Treasury with loans.

The 7th Baronet, who served as High Sheriff of Worcestershire in 1901, assumed in 1905 by Royal licence the surname of Grey for himself and issue in lieu of his patronymic. This surname was also borne by the 8th Baronet. As of 2026 the title is marked "dormant" by the Official Roll.

== Lambert baronets, of London (1711) ==
- Sir John Lambert, 1st Baronet (1666–1723)
- Sir John Lambert, 2nd Baronet (1690–1772)
- Sir John Lambert, 3rd Baronet (1728–1799)
- Sir Henry Lambert, 4th Baronet (c.1756–1803)
- Sir Henry John Lambert, 5th Baronet (1792–1858)
- Sir Henry Edward Francis Lambert, 6th Baronet (1822–1872)
- Sir Henry Foley Grey, 7th Baronet (1861–1914)
- Sir John Foley Grey, 8th Baronet (1893–1938)
- Sir Greville Foley Lambert, 9th Baronet (1900–1988)
- Peter John Biddulph Lambert, presumed 10th Baronet (born 1952)

The heir apparent is Thomas John Lambert (born 1999).

Baronetage of Great Britain
Preceded by Brown baronets	Lambert baronets of London; 16 February 1711	Succeeded by Lake baronets
