= Paul C. Lambert =

American diplomat (1928–2026)

Paul C. Lambert (March 14, 1928 – January 2, 2026) was an American diplomat who was the United States Ambassador to Ecuador from 1990 to 1992. He submitted his resignation in December 1991 saying Ecuador is “a country plagued by corruption and excessive bureaucracy.”

== Background ==
Lambert was born in New York City on March 14, 1928. He graduated from Yale University (A.B., 1950) before continuing his education at Harvard Law School (J.D. 1953). He served in the US Army (G-2) after graduating from law school (from 1953 to 1955). Lambert began working as a lawyer in 1955 with the law firm of Milbank, Tweed, Hadley and McCloy in New York City. From 1966 to 1990, Lambert was a partner of Breed, Abbott & Morgan leaving when he became a United States Ambassador.

He joined the law firm McLaughlin & Stern as a partner in early 2004, focusing on estate planning, estate and trust administration, and Surrogate's Court litigation. During his legal career, Lambert “has been involved in some of the most significant estate and trust litigations of the last several decades, including Matter of Rothko, Estate of J. Seward Johnson, Matter of Stillman and Matter of Rockefeller.”

Long active in New York State politics, Lambert was a member of the Executive Committee of the New York State Republican Party from 1983 to 1990, and served on the Steering Committee and Finance Committee for the 1988 George Bush for President election campaign. He served as a member New York Delegation to the Republican National Conventions in 1984, 1988, and 1992.

Lambert was an active supporter of Yale. He contributed in many ways including serving as Chairman of the Board of Governors of the Association of Yale Alumni, as a Director of the Yale Alumni Fund, and as a member of the Yale Development Board, the Honorary Degree Committee, and the University Council. Because of his efforts, he was awarded the Yale Medal in 1988.

Lambert died in New York City on January 2, 2026, at the age of 97.
