= John Lambert (naval historian) =

British naval illustrator and historian (1937–2016)

John Lambert (1937 – January 11, 2016) was a British naval illustrator and historian. He specialised in naval boats up to destroyer size. The information he presented, and his detailed drawings of warships and their weapons systems, were referenced from official naval and shipbuilder sources.

He has written over 350 magazine articles for Model Boats, Airfix Magazine, Scale Models, Model Shipwright, Interavia and Marine Modelling International.

== Books ==
Allied Coastal Forces of World War II - by John Lambert and Al Ross

- Volume I : Fairmile designs and US Submarine Chasers, 1990, ISBN 978-0-85177-519-7
- Volume II : Vosper designs and US Elcos, 1993, ISBN 0-85177-602-7
- Volume III : British Power Boat Company, Camper and Nicholson designs (yet to be completed).

The Fairmile D Motor Torpedo Boat (Anatomy of the Ship series) by John Lambert, 1985, ISBN 0-85177-321-4

The Submarine Alliance (Anatomy of the Ship series) by John Lambert and David Hill, 1986, ISBN 0-85177-380-X

Flower Class Corvettes in World War II (Warship Perspective series) by John Lambert and Alan Raven, 2000

== See also ==
(Topics John Lambert has written extensively on)

- Fairmile Marine
- Vosper & Company
- Submarine chaser
- Electric Launch Company
- British Power Boat Company
- Fairmile D motor torpedo boat
- Flower-class corvette
- British Coastal Forces of World War Two
