= Harry Lambert (sportsman) =

Australian rules footballer and cricketer

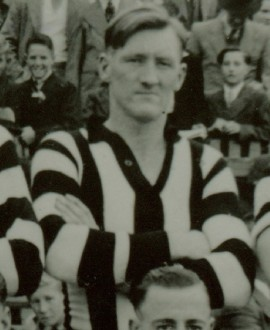
- Lambert during his Collingwood career

Personal information
- Full name: Henry Francis Lambert
- Born: 8 July 1918; Bairnsdale, Victoria, Australia
- Died: 19 June 1995 (aged 76); Grange, South Australia
- Batting: Right-handed
- Bowling: Left-arm fast-medium
- Role: Bowler

Domestic team information
- Years: Team
- 1946/47–1953/54: Victoria

Career statistics
Competition	First-class
Matches	33
Runs scored	577
Batting average	15.18
100s/50s	0/2
Top score	59
Balls bowled	5,454
Wickets	76
Bowling average	28.72
5 wickets in innings	2
10 wickets in match	0
Best bowling	6/55
Catches/stumpings	15/–
- Source: CricketArchive, 8 October 2022

Henry Francis Lambert (8 July 1918 – 19 June 1995) was an Australian first-class cricket player who represented Victoria in the Sheffield Shield and the Commonwealth XI from 1946 to 1954. He also played Australian rules football during the 1940s with Collingwood in the Victorian Football League (VFL).

== Career ==
=== Football ===
Lambert was initially a footballer and, in only his second VFL game, kicked six goals against Hawthorn at Victoria Park. Recruited from Abbotsford, he kicked another four the following weekend and finished the 1941 season with 19 goals from seven games. After only five appearances over the next four years, the forward played 11 games in 1946. He had a productive finals campaign, kicking three goals in Collingwood's drawn semi-final against Essendon and two in the preliminary final loss to the Melbourne. Lambert ended his career in 1947 with 27 games and 48 goals for Collingwood.

=== Cricket ===
After a couple of first-class fixtures against Tasmania in December 1946, Lambert made his Sheffield Shield debut in the 1947–48 competition. The following season, he took 17 wickets at 22.88 with his left-arm fast-medium bowling, which earned him a spot in the Commonwealth XI team to tour India, Pakistan, and Ceylon. He bowled well in India, taking 25 wickets at 32.24, including eight in four matches against the national team.

Lambert spent the 1949 English summer playing as a professional with Ramsbottom in the Lancashire League.

In 1953–54, his last first-class season, Lambert achieved career-best figures of 6 for 55 against New South Wales, dismissing Jim Burke and Keith Miller. He also batted well in that match after being promoted to the top order, scoring 29 and 43. His batting improved over the years, and in his final first-class match, against New Zealand at the Melbourne Cricket Ground, Lambert opened the batting and scored 50. The only other half-century of his career was an innings of 59 in 1950, when he batted in the lower order for the Commonwealth XI against Bombay.
