= Industrialisation =

Period of social and economic change from agrarian to industrial society

According to the Maddison Project, Italy (green line) was the most productive region of Europe in 1500 (GDP per capita) and Britain (black line) the leader by 1800 but it was the 19th century that experienced a historically unprecedented explosion of productivity.

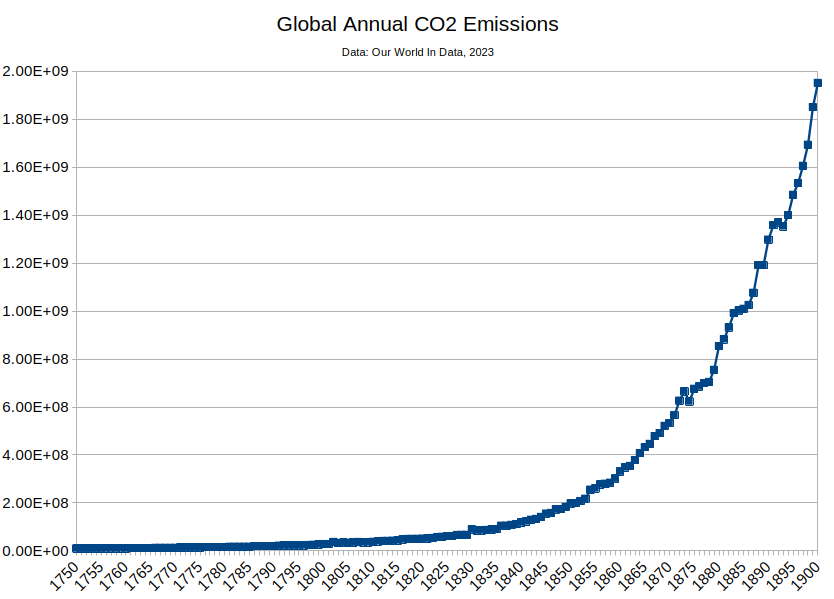
The effect of industrialisation is also shown by rising levels of CO2 emissions.

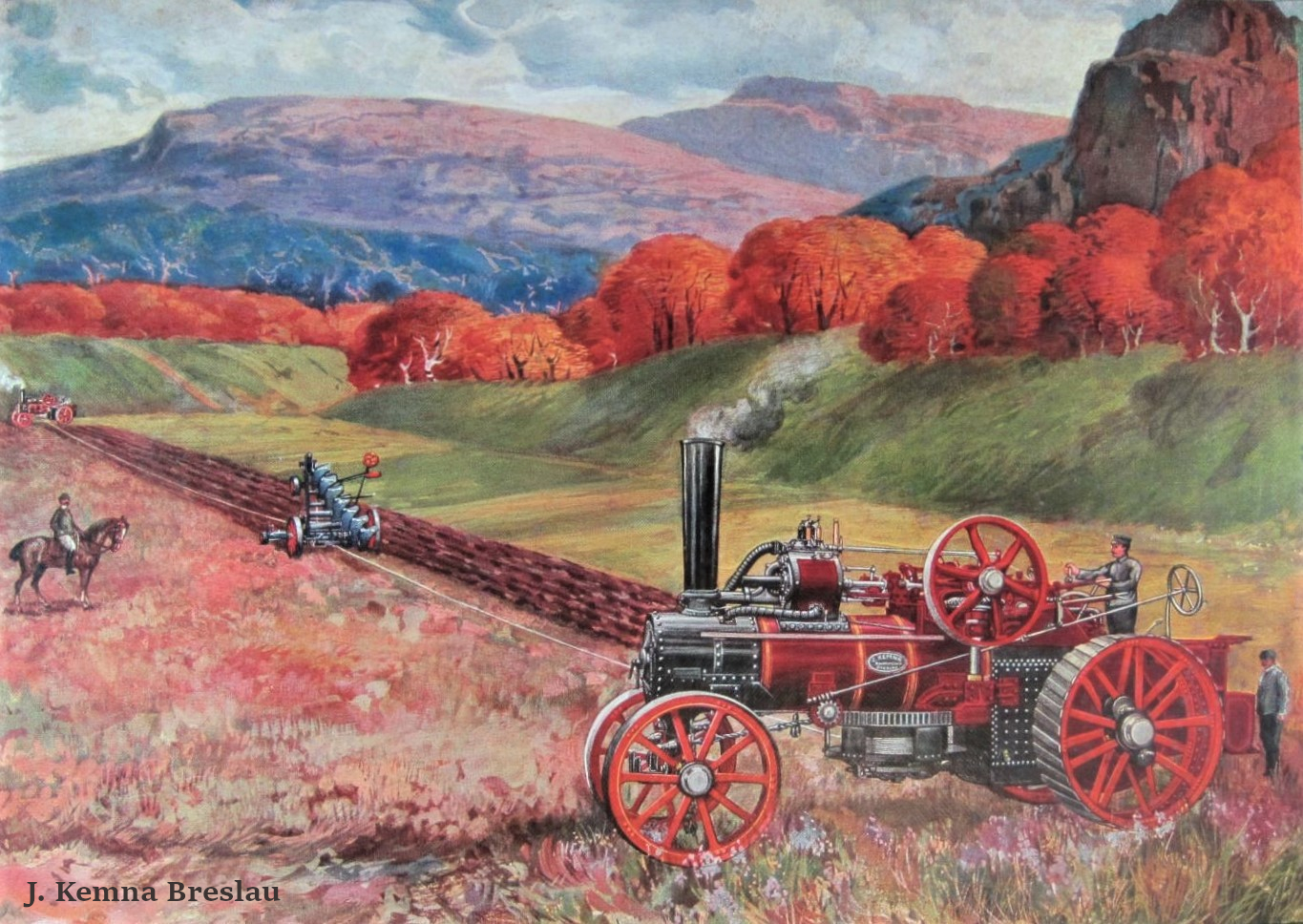
Industrialisation also means the mechanisation of traditionally manual economic sectors such as agriculture.

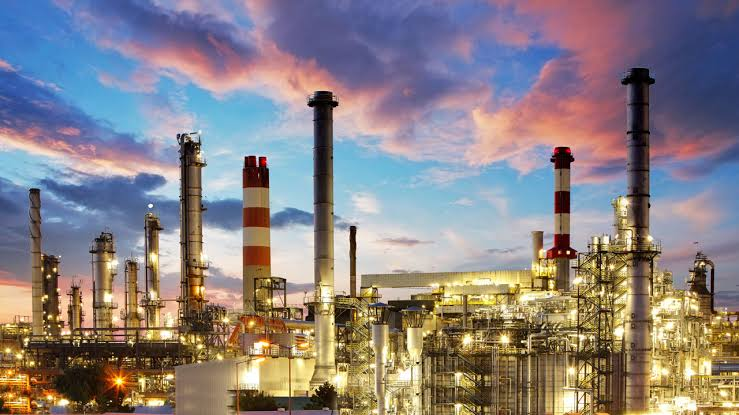
Factories, refineries, mines, and agribusiness are all elements of industrialisation.

Industrialisation (UK) or industrialization (US) is "the period of social and economic change that transforms a human group from an agrarian and feudal society into an industrial society. This involves an extensive reorganisation of an economy for the purpose of manufacturing." Industrialisation is associated with an increase in polluting industries heavily dependent on fossil fuels. With the increasing focus on sustainable development and green industrial policy practices, industrialisation increasingly includes technological leapfrogging, with direct investment in more advanced, cleaner technologies.

The reorganisation of the economy has many unintended consequences both economically and socially. As industrial workers' incomes rise, markets for consumer goods and services of all kinds tend to expand and provide a further stimulus to industrial investment and economic growth. Moreover, family structures tend to shift as extended families tend to no longer live together in one household, location or place.

== Background ==
The first transformation from an agricultural to an industrial economy is known as the Industrial Revolution and took place from the mid-18th to the early 19th century. It began in Great Britain, spreading to Belgium, Switzerland, Germany, and France and eventually to other areas in Europe and North America. Characteristics of this early industrialisation were technological progress, a shift from rural work to industrial labour, and financial investments in new industrial structures. Later commentators have called this the First Industrial Revolution.

The "Second Industrial Revolution" labels the later changes that came about in the mid-19th century after the refinement of the steam engine, the invention of the internal combustion engine, the harnessing of electricity and the construction of canals, railways, and electric-power lines. The invention of the assembly line gave this phase a boost. Coal mines, steelworks, and textile factories replaced homes as the place of work.

By the end of the 20th century, East Asia had become one of the most recently industrialised regions of the world.

There is considerable literature on the factors facilitating industrial modernisation and enterprise development.

== Social consequences ==
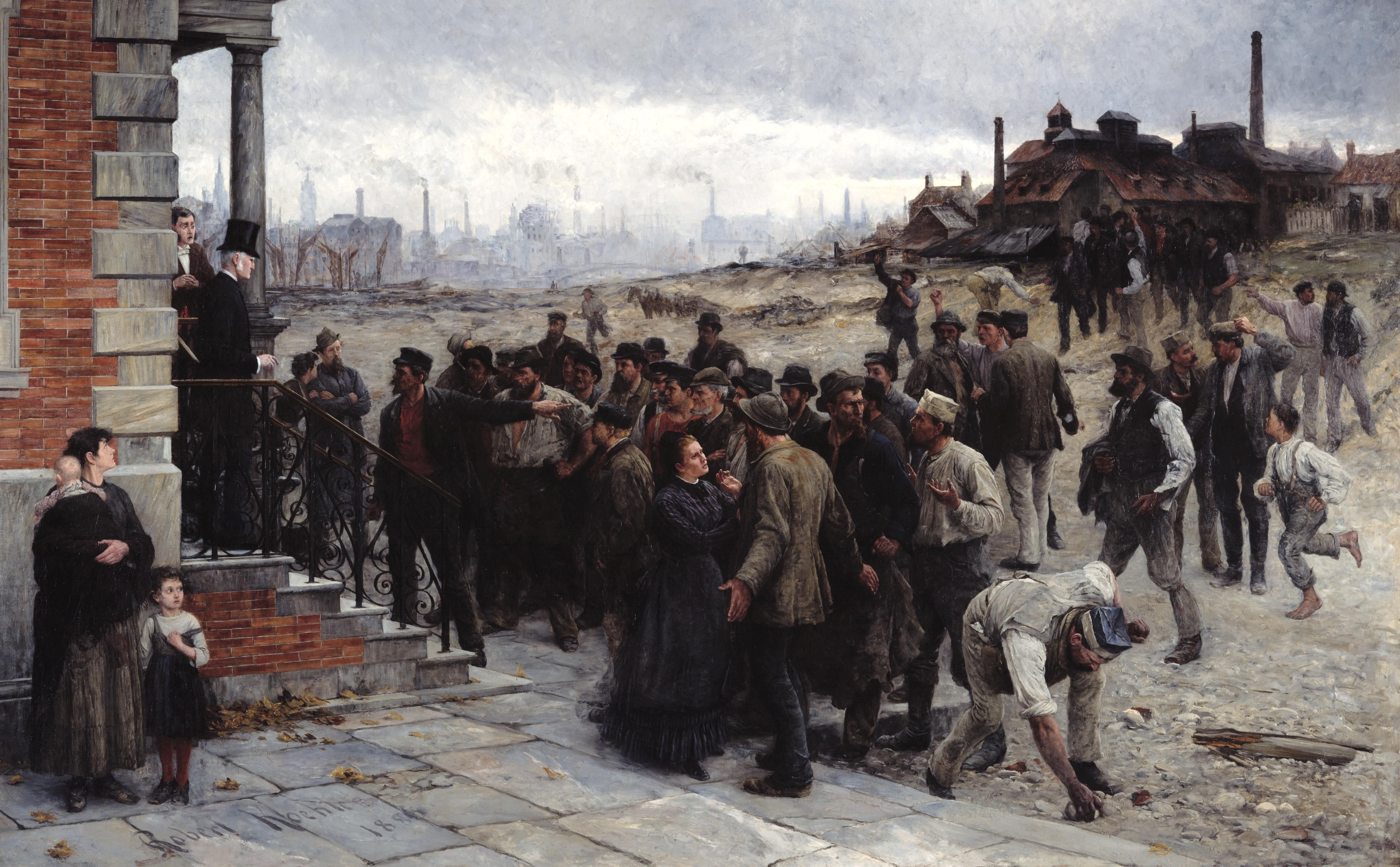
An 1886 portrait by Robert Koehler depicting agitated workers facing a factory owner in a strike

The Industrial Revolution was accompanied by significant changes in the social structure, the main change being a transition from farm work to factory-related activities. This has resulted in the concept of Social class, i.e., hierarchical social status defined by an individual's economic power. It has changed the family system as most people moved into cities, with extended family living apart becoming more common. The movement into more dense urban areas from less dense agricultural areas has consequently increased the transmission of diseases. Overcrowded housing, poor sanitation, and limited access to clean water created ideal conditions for illnesses such as cholera, typhoid, and tuberculosis to spread rapidly. The place of women in society has shifted from primary caregivers to breadwinners, thus reducing the number of children per household. Furthermore, industrialisation contributed to increased cases of child labour and thereafter education systems.

=== Urbanisation ===
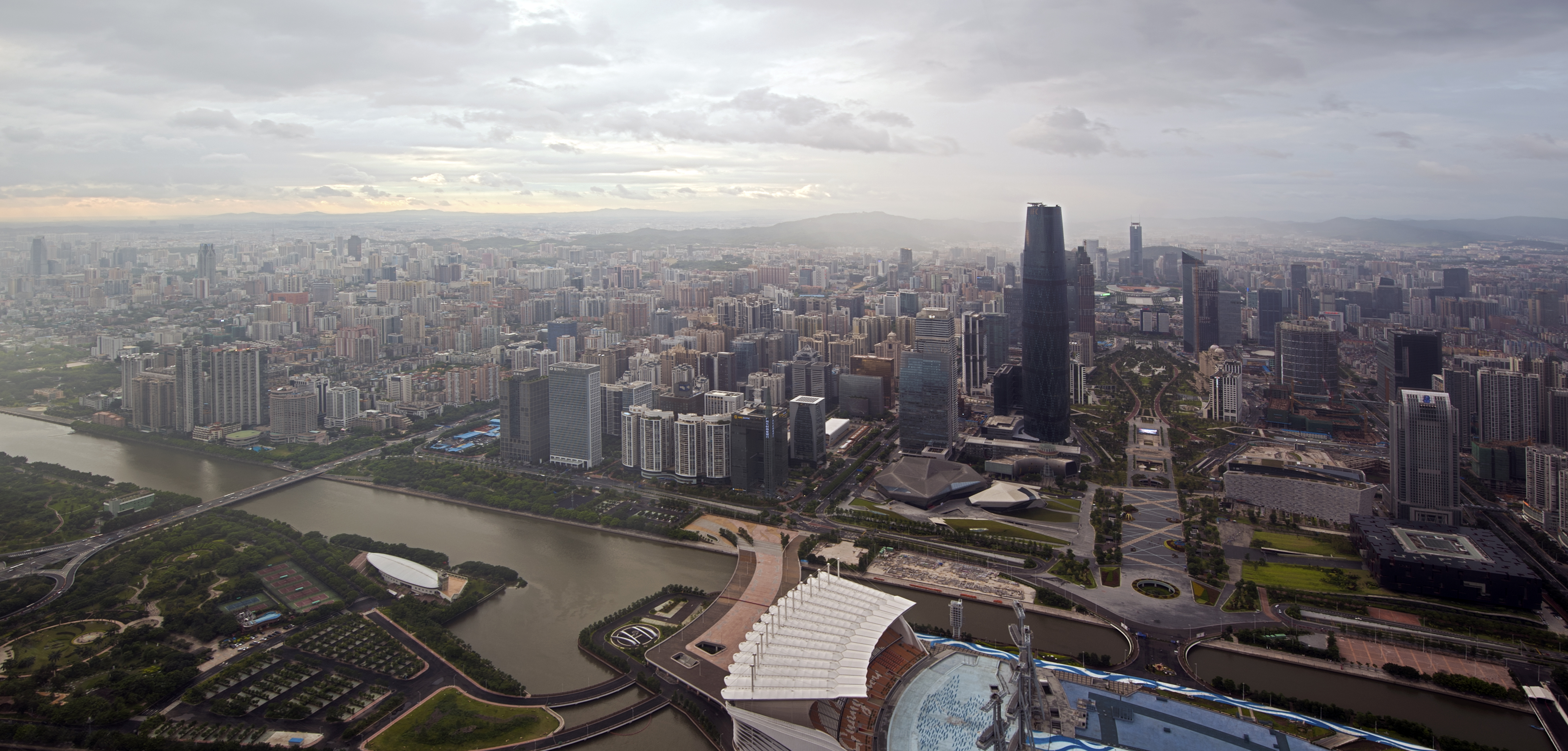
A panorama of Guangzhou at dusk

As the Industrial Revolution was a shift from an agrarian society, people migrated from villages in search of jobs to places where factories were established. This shifting of rural people led to urbanisation and an increase in the population of towns. The concentration of labour in factories has increased urbanisation and the size of settlements to serve and house factory workers.

=== Nuclear family ===
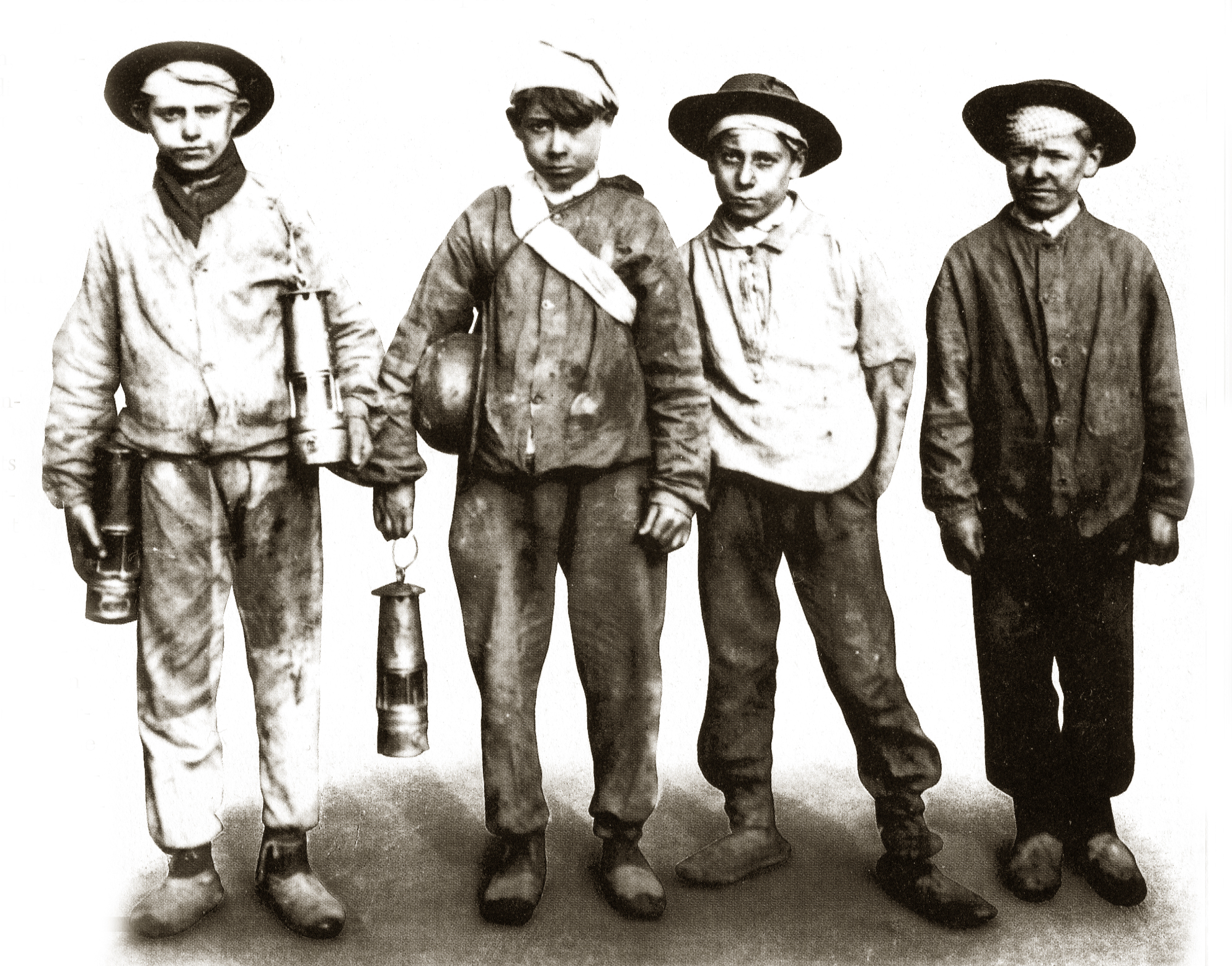
Child coal miners in Prussia, late 19th century

Talcott Parsons’ theory that industrialisation created the nuclear family is widely contested by historians who argue that reverses the history. Historian Peter Laslett’s empirical research indicates that most households in pre-industrial England were already nuclear while the anthropologist Alan Macfarlane contends that a pre-existing nuclear family structure, and the individualism it tended to create, were deeply rooted cultural patterns and were a cause, rather than a product, of the Industrial Revolution. Their work suggests that the "mobile nuclear family" was not a modern invention of the factory age but a long-standing cultural foundation for it and also directly contradicts the idea that industrialisation destroyed the extended family, suggesting instead that the family was already small and mobile long before industrial-era urban migration began.

== By region ==
=== Chile ===
Industrialization in Chile was spearheaded by Charles Saint Lambert who by 1840 had established modern reverberatory furnaces for copper smelting in Fundición Lambert, La Serena. Through his contacts in he and his son continuously imported the latest smelting technologies from Swansea. Considering the enterprizes of Saint Lambert an outlier the onset of Chilean industrialization has often been dated to the end of the 19th century. The 1870s saw of industries like sugar refineries, confectioneries and shoe and textile factories emerge. Since the 1980s some scholars have argued that Chile was en route to becoming a full-fledged industrialized nation before 1914, yet economist Ducoing claims no industrialization took place, but rather a modernization process.

=== East Asia ===
Between the early 1960s and 1990s, the Four Asian Tigers (Hong Kong, Singapore, South Korea, and Taiwan) underwent rapid industrialisation and maintained exceptionally high growth rates.

== Current situation ==
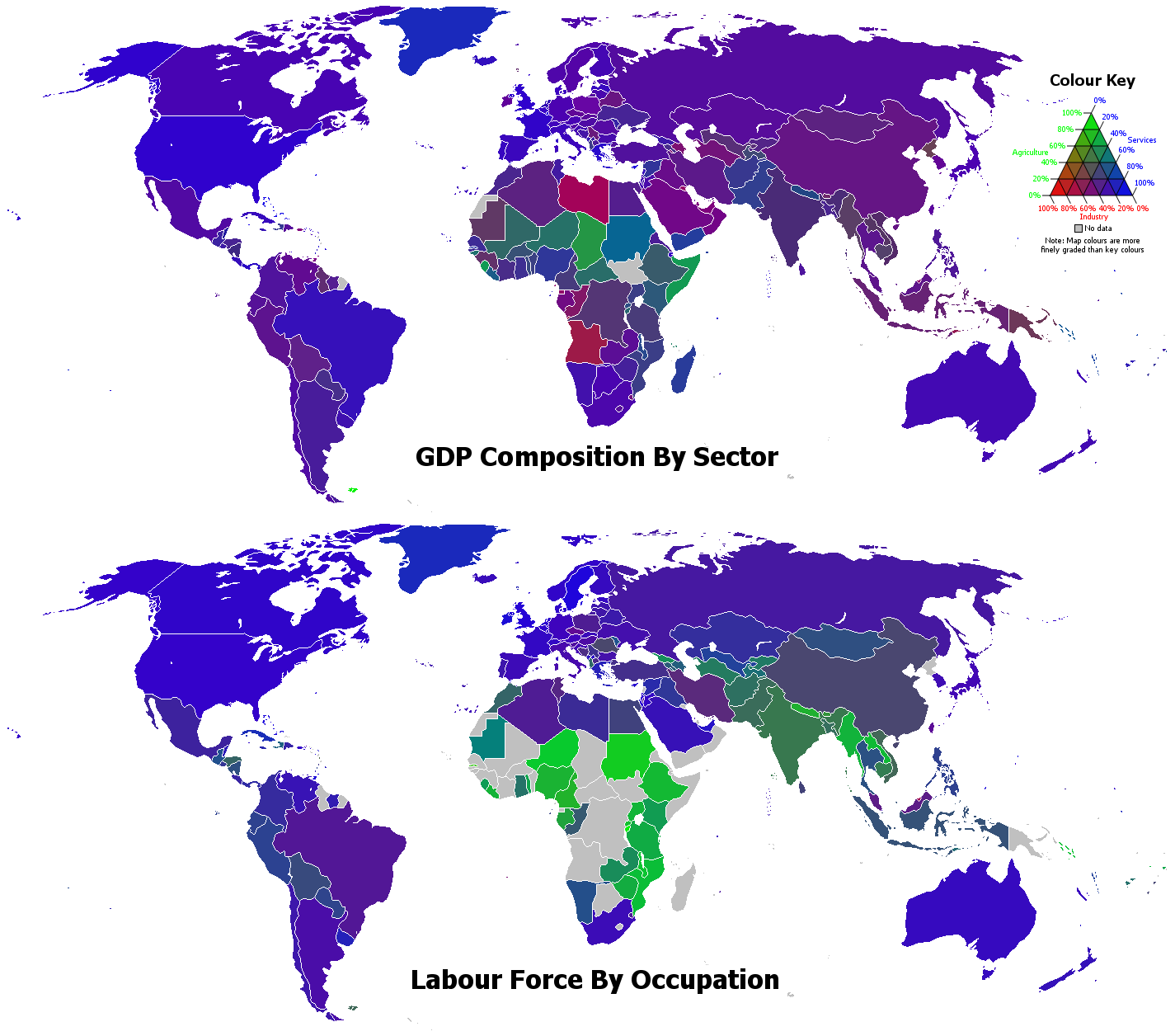
2006 GDP by sector and labour force by occupation with the green, red, and blue components of the colours of the countries representing the percentages for the agriculture, industry, and services sectors, respectively

As of 2018 the international development community (World Bank, Organisation for Economic Co-operation and Development (OECD), many United Nations departments, FAO WHO ILO and UNESCO, endorses development policies like water purification or primary education and co-operation amongst third world communities. Some members of the economic communities do not consider contemporary industrialisation policies as being adequate to the global south (Third World countries) or beneficial in the longer term, with the perception that they may only create inefficient local industries unable to compete in the free-trade dominated political order which industrialisation has fostered. Environmentalism and Green politics may represent more visceral reactions to industrial growth. Nevertheless, repeated examples in history of apparently successful industrialisation (Britain, Soviet Union, South Korea, China, etc.) may make conventional industrialisation seem like an attractive or even natural path forward, especially as populations grow, consumerist expectations rise and agricultural opportunities diminish.

The relationships among economic growth, employment, and poverty reduction are complex, and higher productivity can sometimes lead to static or even lower employment (see jobless recovery). There are differences across sectors, whereby manufacturing is less able than the tertiary sector to accommodate both increased productivity and employment opportunities; more than 40% of the world's employees are "working poor", whose incomes fail to keep themselves and their families above the $2-a-day poverty line. There is also a phenomenon of deindustrialisation, as in the former USSR countries' transition to market economies, and the agriculture sector is often the key sector in absorbing the resultant unemployment.

== See also ==
- Automation – Use of various control systems for operating equipment
- Deindustrialisation – Process of reduction of industrial activity
- Division of labour – Separation of tasks in any system so that participants may specialise
- Great Divergence – West's economic growth vs other advanced regions
- Idea of Progress
- Mass production – High volume production of standardized products
- Mechanisation – Process of changing from working by hand or with animals to work with machinery
- Newly industrialised country – Socioeconomic classification
- Reindustrialization – Economic, social, and political process
- Scientific Revolution – Emergence of modern science (1572–1687)
