= Lockwood Morris & Co =

Lockwood, Morris & Co was one of the first Swansea copper smelters.

Richard Lockwood of London, Edward Gibbon of Putney, Edward Monington of London and Robert Morris of Swansea in 1727 (who became their manager) took over the Llangevelach Copper Works at Landore, established in 1717 by Dr John Lane, following his 1726 bankruptcy. The works had a smelting house, a s-storey chamber with three open-sided square smelting cupolas. In addition there were a battering-mill for making copper sheet and a copper rod mill.

The works remained in the hands of the firm for many years. Initially the firm had coal from Thomas Popkins of Forest, but by the 1760s opened their won coalmines. John Morris had a railway with iron rails in 1776.

== See also ==
- Fundición Lambert
