= Rue de Tournon =

Street in the 6th arrondissement of Paris, France

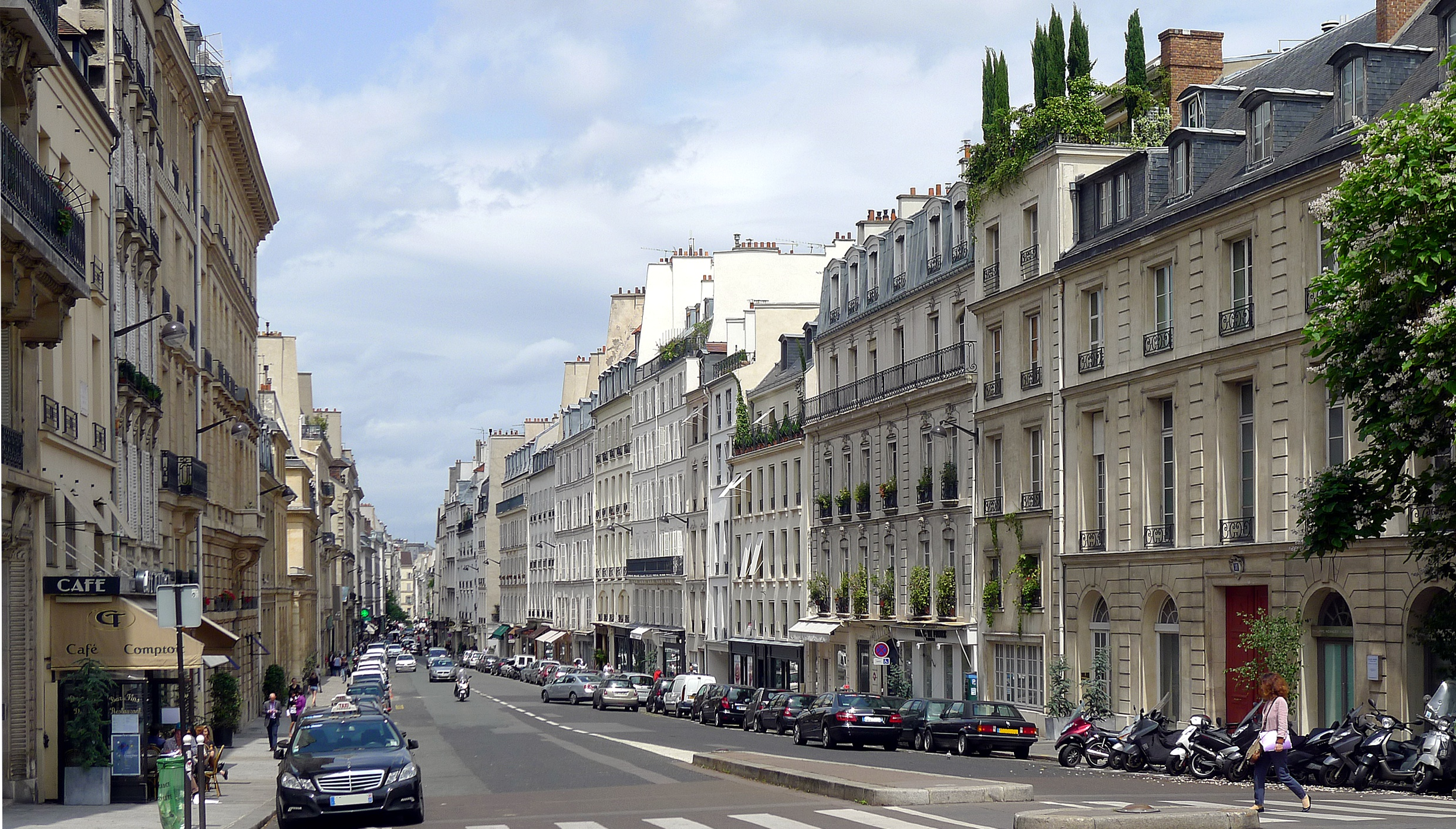
- The Rue de Tournon seen from the Rue de Vaugirard
- Interactive map of Rue de Tournon
- Former name(s): Ruelle Saint-Sulpice, Ruelle du Champ de Foire, Rue du Marché aux Chevaux, Rue du Sénat
- Length: 233 m (764 ft)
- Width: 13.70 m
- Location: 6th arrondissement of Paris, France
- Arrondissement: 6th
- Quarter: Odéon district
- Coordinates: 48.8504397°N 2.3371895°E
- From: 19, Rue Saint-Sulpice
- To: 24, Rue de Vaugirard

Construction
- Commissioned: 1541

The Rue de Tournon is a street in the 6th arrondissement of Paris, France. To the south, it offers a view of the Senate façade. At its northern end, it continues into the Rue de Seine, which leads to the Seine River. The street is located near the Jardin du Luxembourg.

== Location and access ==
The Rue de Tournon begins at nos. 19 and 21 Rue Saint-Sulpice and ends at nos. 22bis and 24 Rue de Vaugirard. Aligned roughly north-south with the Palais du Luxembourg, it is one of Paris's most prestigious streets. The street widens toward the south near the Rue de Vaugirard, creating a visual perspective toward the Senate. To the north, it extends into the Rue de Seine, reaching the Quai Malaquais.

Historically, the street was lined with antiquarian bookshops, some of which remain, though many have been replaced by clothing stores and hair salons.

The street is close to the Musée du Luxembourg, located in a building adjacent to the Senate.

Nearby metro stations include:

- Saint-Sulpice on Line 4;
- Mabillon on Line 10;
- Odéon on Lines 4 and 10;
- Luxembourg on RER B.

== Origin of the name ==
The street is named after Cardinal François de Tournon (1489–1562), born in Tournon-sur-Rhône, who served as abbot of Saint-Germain-des-Prés and a key advisor to Francis I.

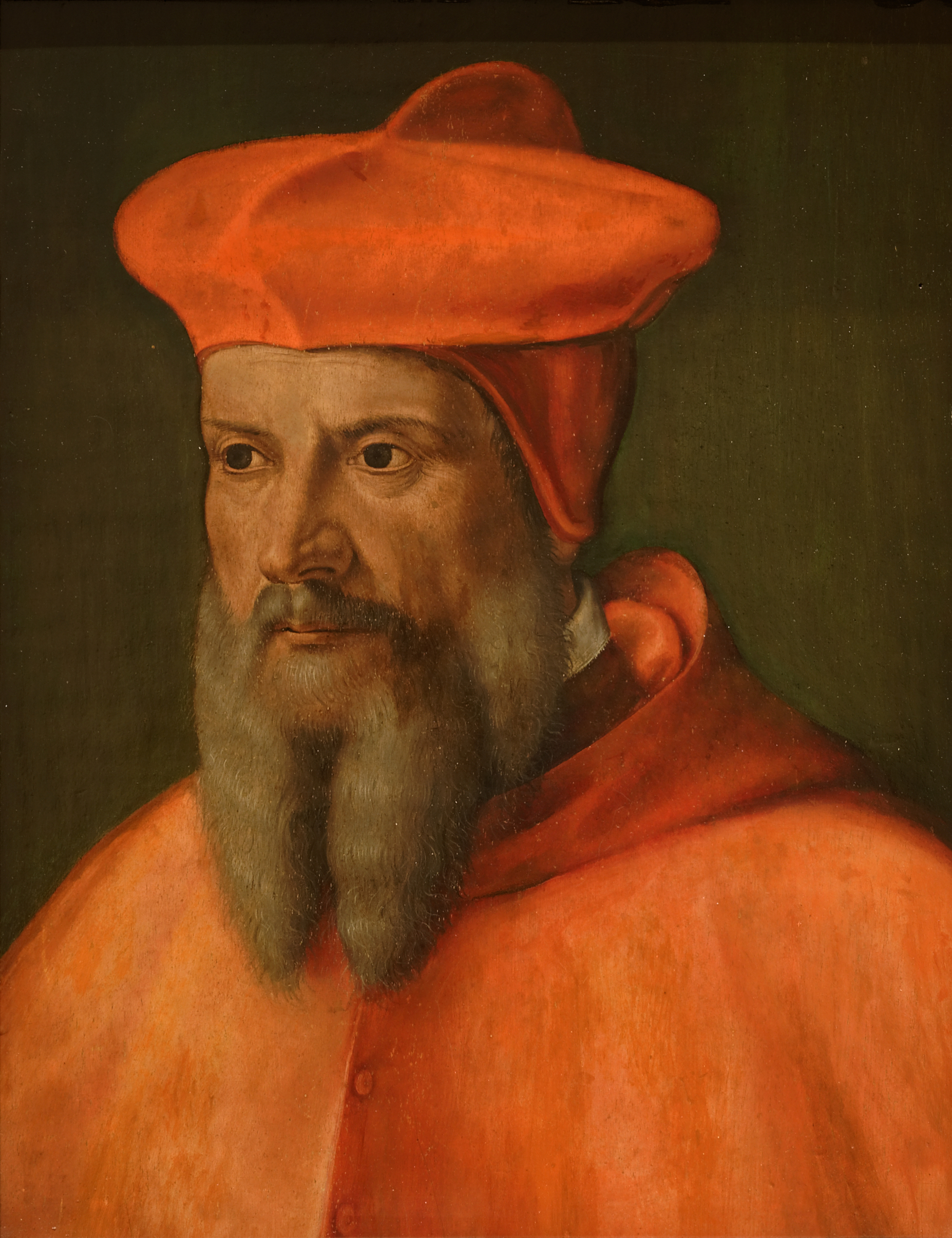
Portrait of Cardinal François de Tournon

Coat of arms of Cardinal François de Tournon

== History ==
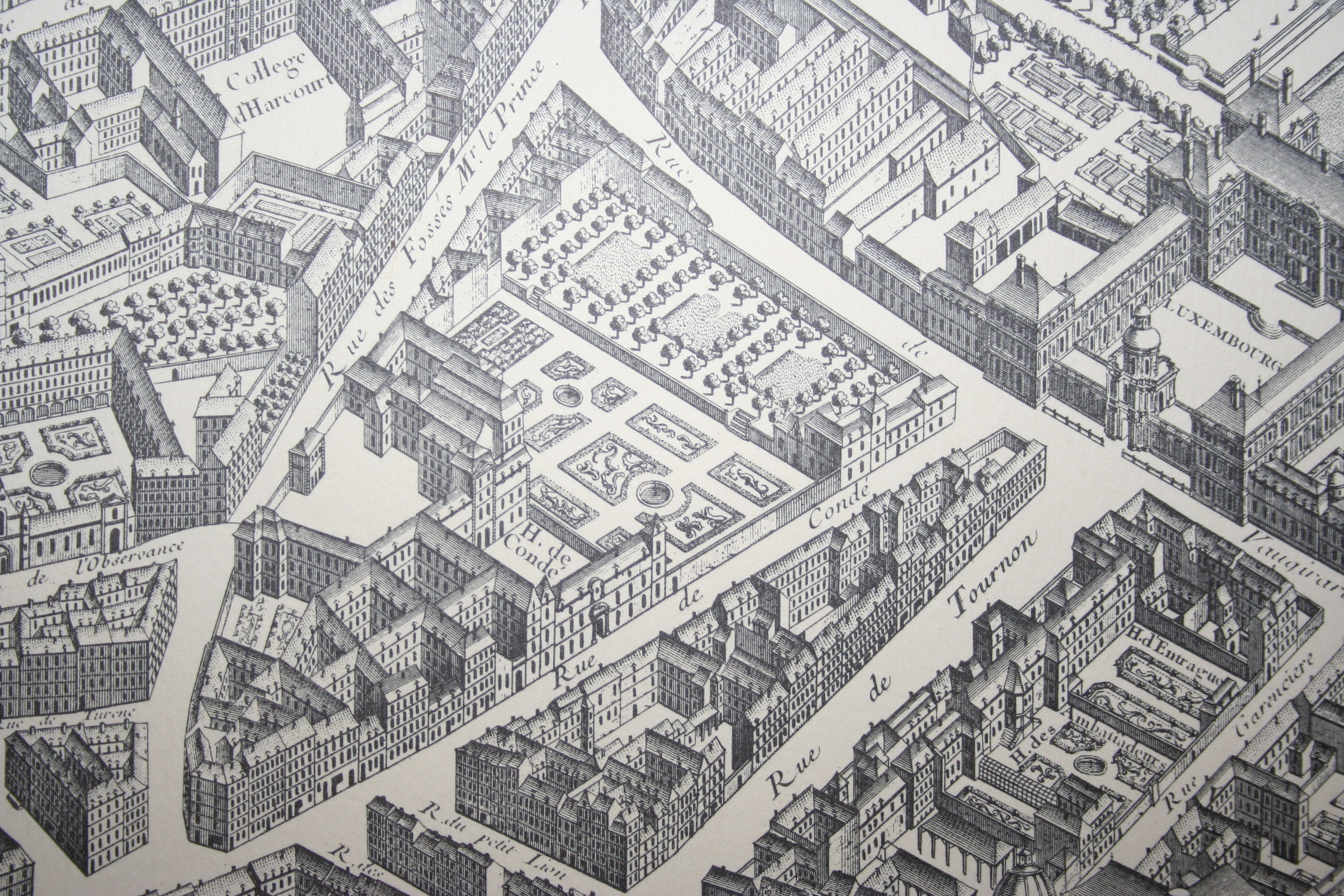
The Rue de Tournon on the Turgot map, 1736

The land on which the street lies was originally marshy terrain owned by the Abbey of Saint-Germain-des-Prés, as documented in the abbey's records. The abbey sold portions of the land, requiring buyers to construct buildings along the street, which was known in 1517 as the "Ruelle de Saint-Sulpice", later as the "Ruelle du Champ de Foire" due to the Saint-Germain fair, and also as the "Rue du Marché aux Chevaux".

By 1541, it was officially named the "Rue de Tournon". The 1549 tax records indicate few houses existed at the time. The street was mentioned as the "Rue de Tournon" in a 1636 manuscript. It also appears on the 1789 Paris road map, which shows a landscaped garden at no. 4.

On 26 February 1867, a prefectural decree renamed part of the street the "Rue du Sénat" due to the small plaza formed where it widens near the Rue de Vaugirard, facing the Senate. It was also called "le Pré-Crotté" (the Muddy Meadow) because of the refuse dumped there. Later, a market was established, and Cardinal de Tournon leased the land to his valet, Jean Gautier, for building houses. This small plaza still exists.

In early Messidor Year IV (July 1796) of the French Republic, the Section de Mucius Scævola (Luxembourg district) initiated "civic banquets" on 11–13 May 1793, held in the streets and in front of houses. The practice spread across Paris, with the Rue de Tournon residents notable for their organization of these events. A report from the Committee of Public Safety on 18 Messidor Year II (6 July 1794) references these banquets. The Commune later halted these gatherings due to excessive drinking and public disorder.

A decree from the Consulate on 18 Vendémiaire Year XI (10 October 1802) extended the street to the Rue de Buci (via the Rue de Seine). A ministerial decision on 3 Nivôse Year X (24 December 1801), signed by Jean-Antoine Chaptal, and a decree by President Louis-Napoléon Bonaparte on 17 January 1849, set the street's width between 13.5 and 26.7 meters. Properties at nos. 11, 33, and all even-numbered buildings were exempt from realignment.

In October 1896, during his visit to France, Russian Tsar Nicholas II traveled along the Rue de Tournon to reach the Palais du Luxembourg.

== Notable buildings and places of interest ==
- No. 1: The site where architect Jean-François Chalgrin proposed installing a standard meter engraved in marble, one of fifteen planned in Paris. It was instead placed nearby at 36 Rue de Vaugirard.
- No. 2: Location of the former Hôtel du Petit-Bourbon, also known as the Hôtel de Châtillon, the Hôtel de France, or the Hôtel de Montmorency (nos. 2–4), built in the 17th century by Louis de Bourbon, Duke of Montpensier. Part of the former Hôtel de Savoie, it belonged to Marguerite de France, aunt of Charles IX, during his reign (1560–1574). There, the widow of the Duke of Montpensier learned of the 1588 assassination of her brothers, the Cardinal de Guise and the Duke of Guise. By the 19th century, only an underground stable remained, predating the 18th-century façades. Residents included François de Béthune (1600–1678), Jean de Dunois, controller general of the king’s buildings, and Balzac (1827–1830). A plaque commemorates Antoine Augustin Cournot, mathematician and philosopher, who lived and died there in 1877. The building is listed as a historic monument.
- No. 4: Hôtel de Palaiseau under Louis XIV, owned by Claude de Harville, Marquis de Palaiseau, and later by his descendants. Classified as a historic monument, it includes the monumental street entrance, courtyard and garden façades, grand staircase, and select private apartments. Notable residents included Lamartine and Ledru-Rollin in 1848, and Jacques Chirac, who died there in 2019.
- No. 5: Home of Marie-Anne Lenormand, a famous fortune-teller, who died there in 1843. Charles Cros, poet and scientist, also died there in 1888; a plaque honors him.
- No. 6: Hôtel de Montpensier, built in 1540 by Louis de Bourbon. Later known as the Hôtel de Brancas or the Hôtel de Terrat, it was designed by Pierre Bullet for Jean-Baptiste Terrat. Classified as a historic monument, it housed the Académie Royale of equestrian arts (1733–1742). Notable residents included Pierre-Simon Laplace in 1808.
- No. 7: Known as the Hôtel du Sénat, it was home to Charles Baudelaire (1846–1848), Léon Gambetta (1858–1861), and Alphonse Daudet in 1857. A plaque commemorates Gambetta.
- No. 8: A listed historic monument, it was home to Raoul Marcel, a French Resistance fighter killed during the Liberation of Paris.
- No. 10: Formerly part of the Hôtel Garancière, known as the Hôtel de Nivernais or the Hôtel des Ambassadeurs, built in 1543. It became a Garde Républicaine barracks in 1821, classified as a historic monument in 1926.
- No. 12: Grand Hôtel d'Entragues, a listed historic monument, built in 1777. It was home to Sophie Lalive de Bellegarde, friend of Jean-Jacques Rousseau, who died there in 1813.
- No. 18: Hôtel de la Poste, where Joseph Roth lived from 1937, hosting literary figures like Stefan Zweig. A plaque commemorates him.
- No. 19: Former residence of John Paul Jones, who died there in 1792. A plaque honors him.
- No. 20: Built in 1900 by architect Georges Debrie, who lived there until 1909. Part of the building is managed by the Senate.
- No. 21: Home of Gabriel Marcel (1933–1973) and the first Saint Laurent Rive Gauche boutique opened by Yves Saint Laurent in 1966.
- No. 23: Site of the Hôtel Helvétia, frequented by Joseph Roth in the 1930s.
- No. 29: A listed historic monument, home to Jules Vallès before the Paris Commune and Charles Joseph Lambert, who died there in 1864.
Commemorative plaques

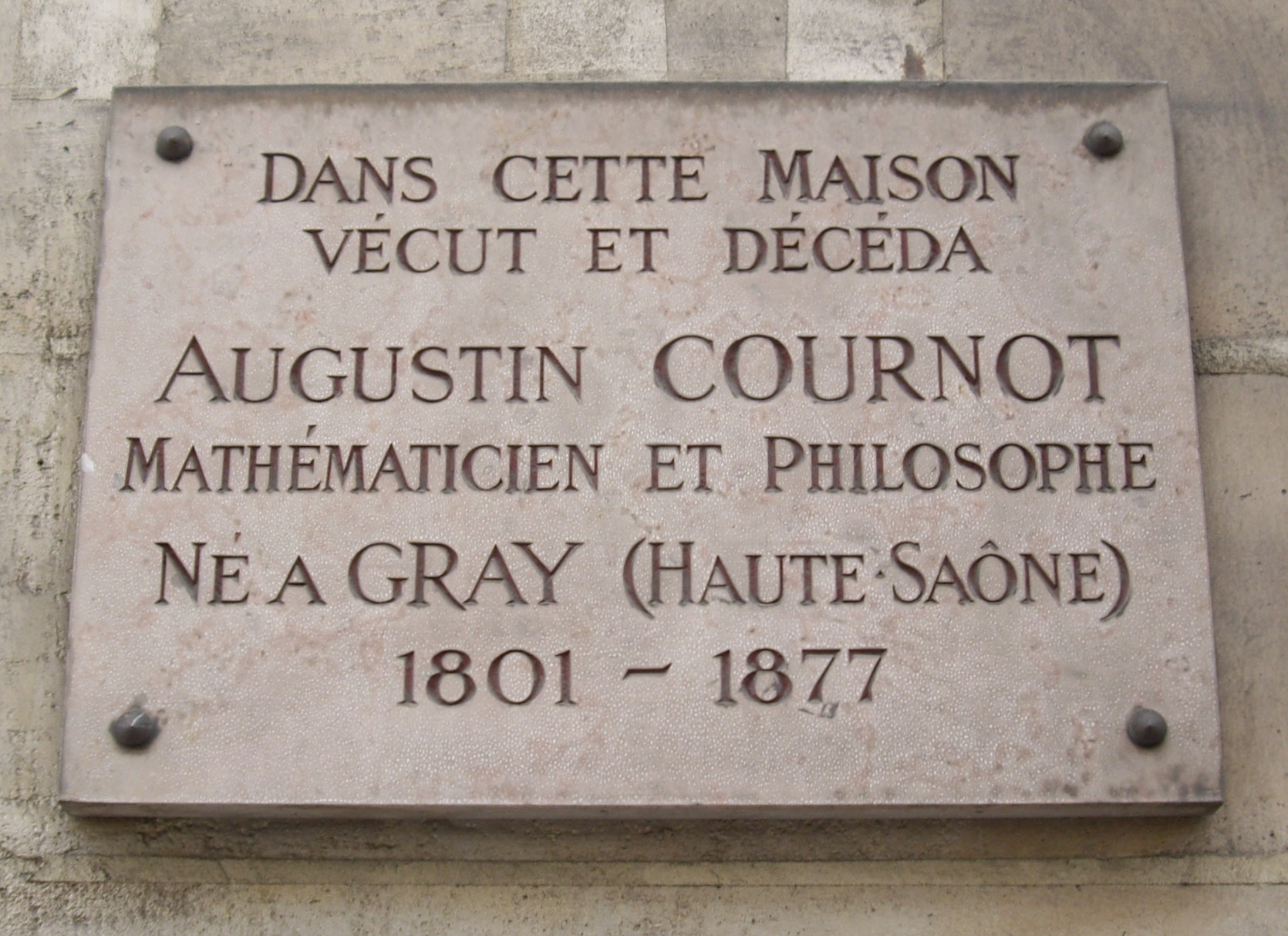
Plaque at no. 2 for Augustin Cournot

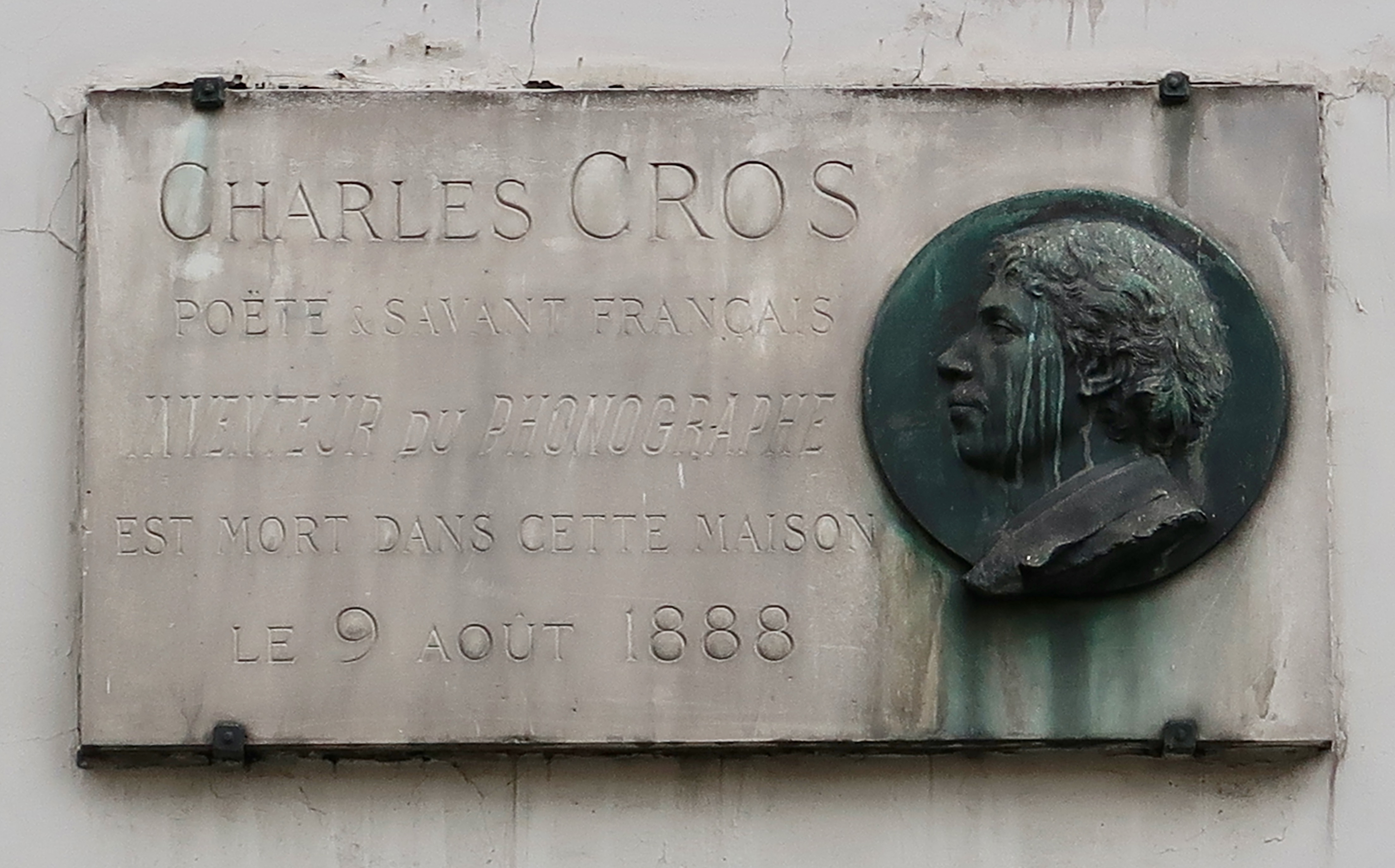
Plaque at no. 5 for Charles Cros

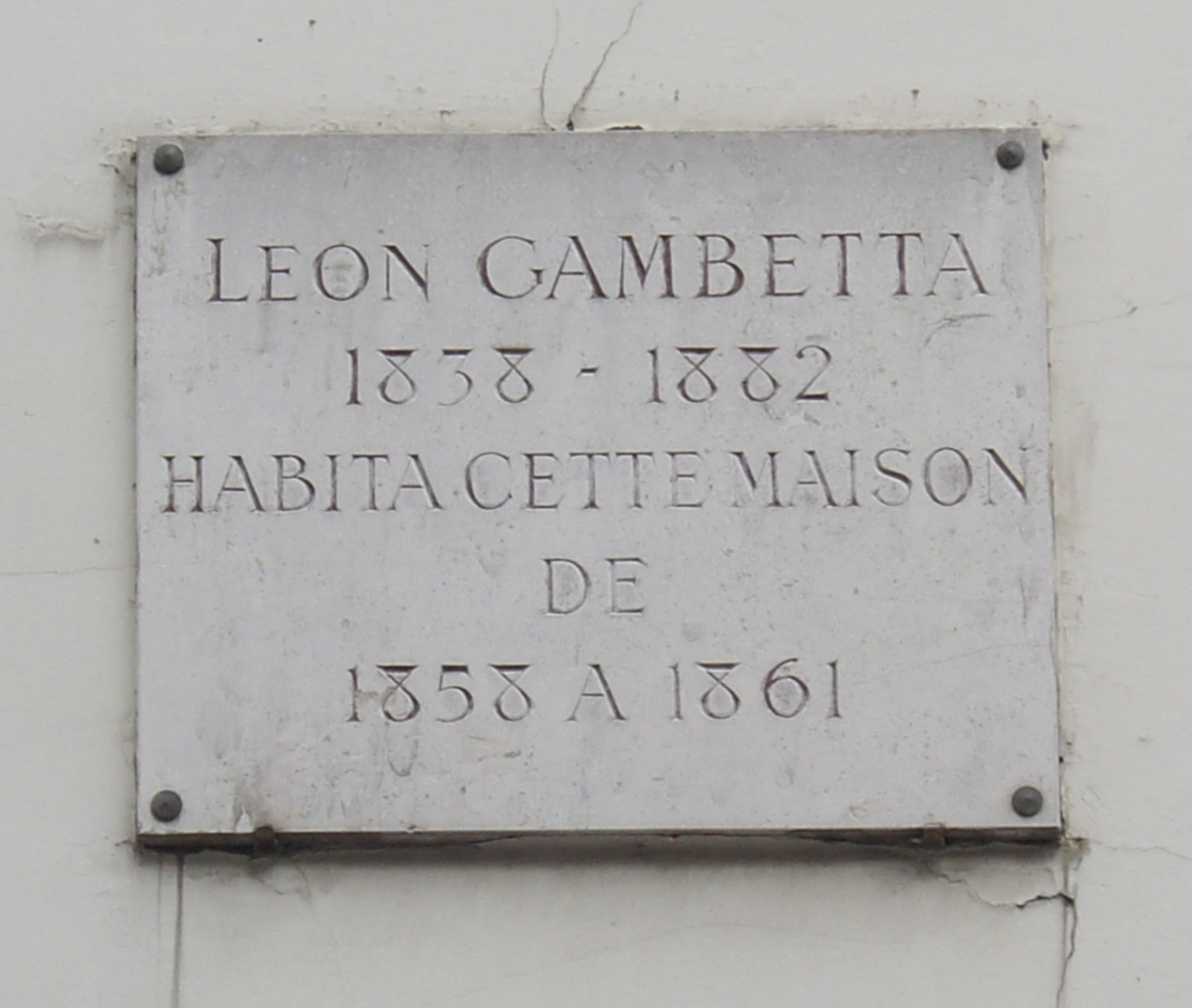
Plaque at no. 7 for Léon Gambetta

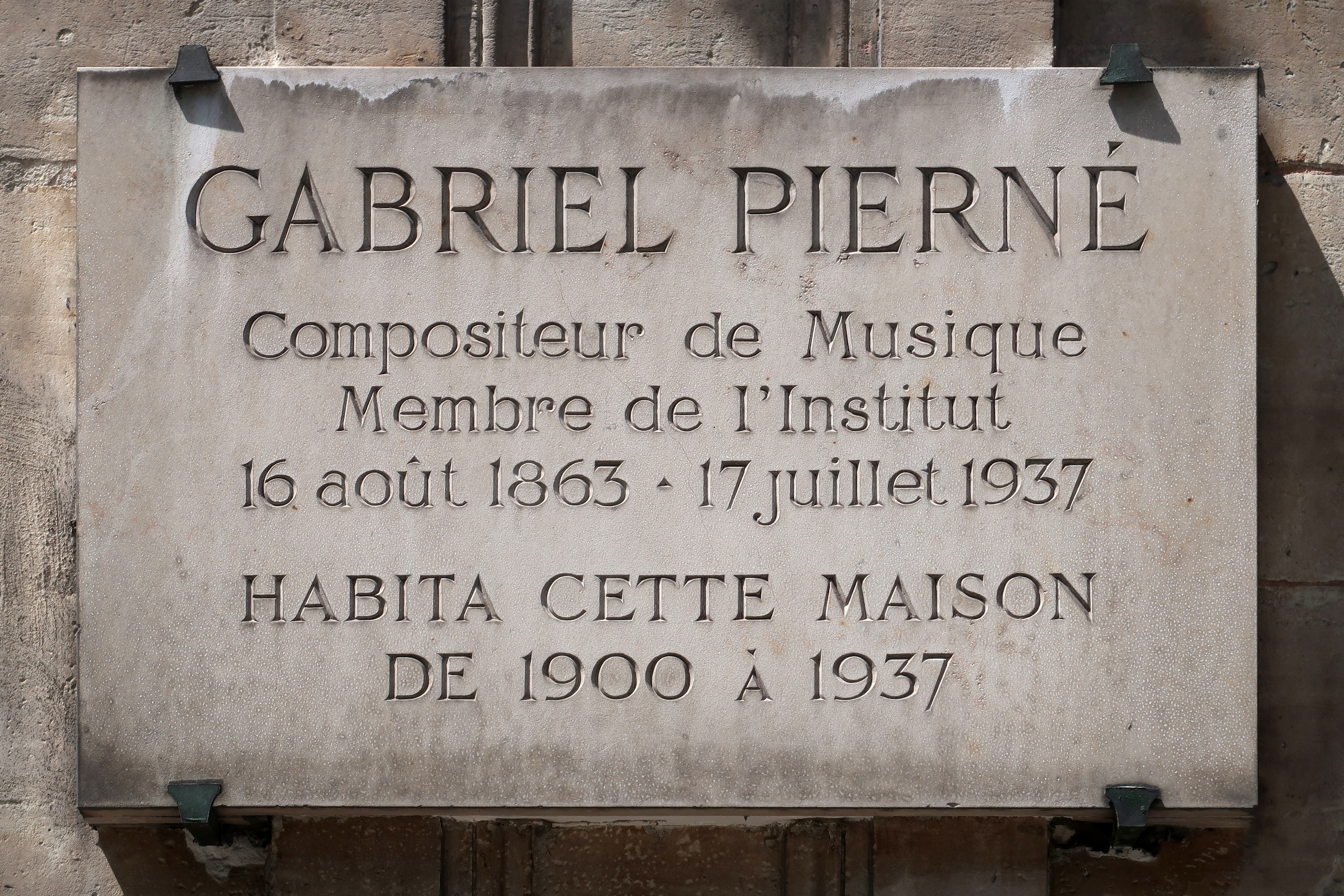
Plaque at no. 8 for Gabriel Pierné

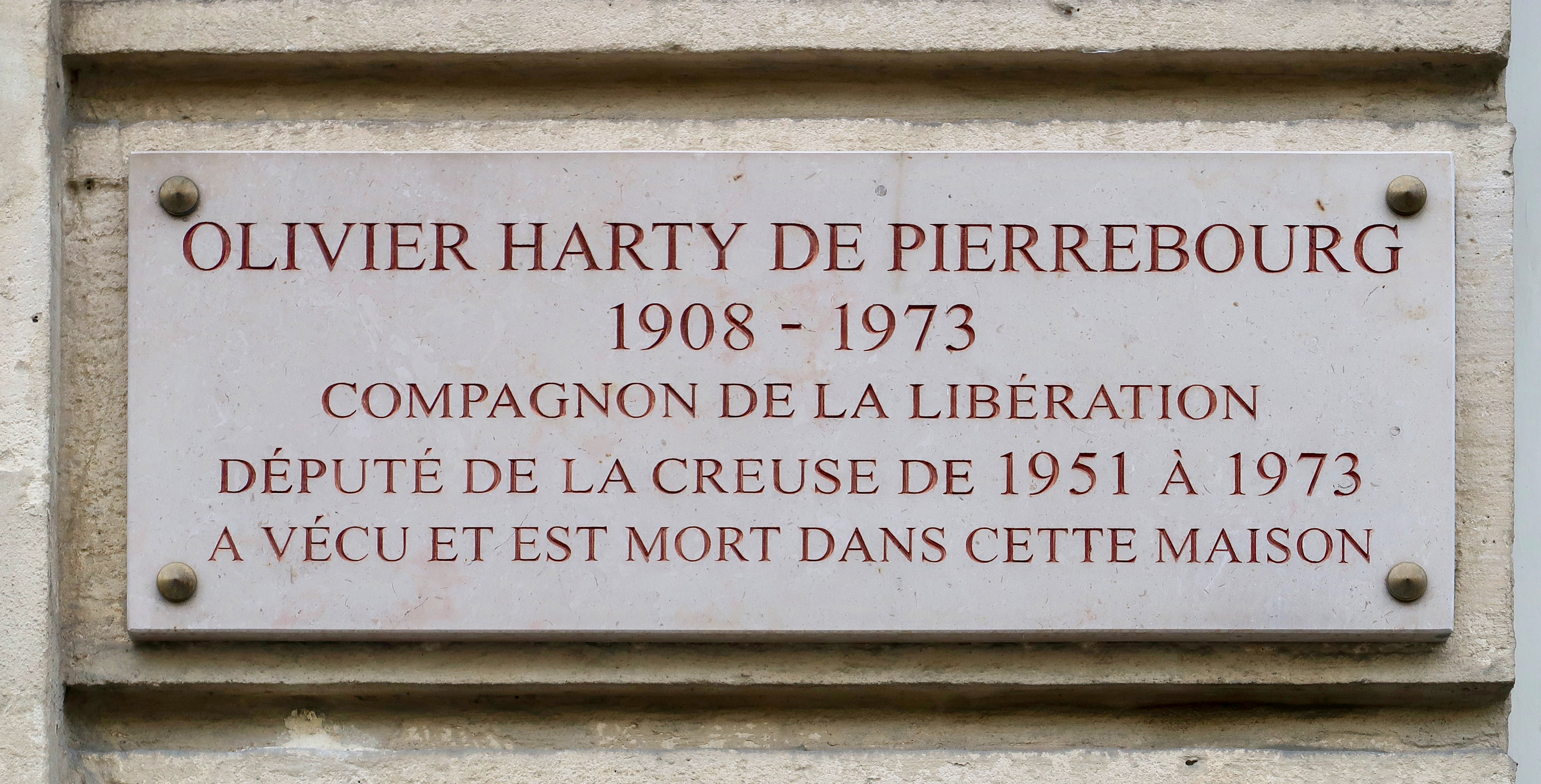
Plaque at no. 14 for Olivier de Pierrebourg

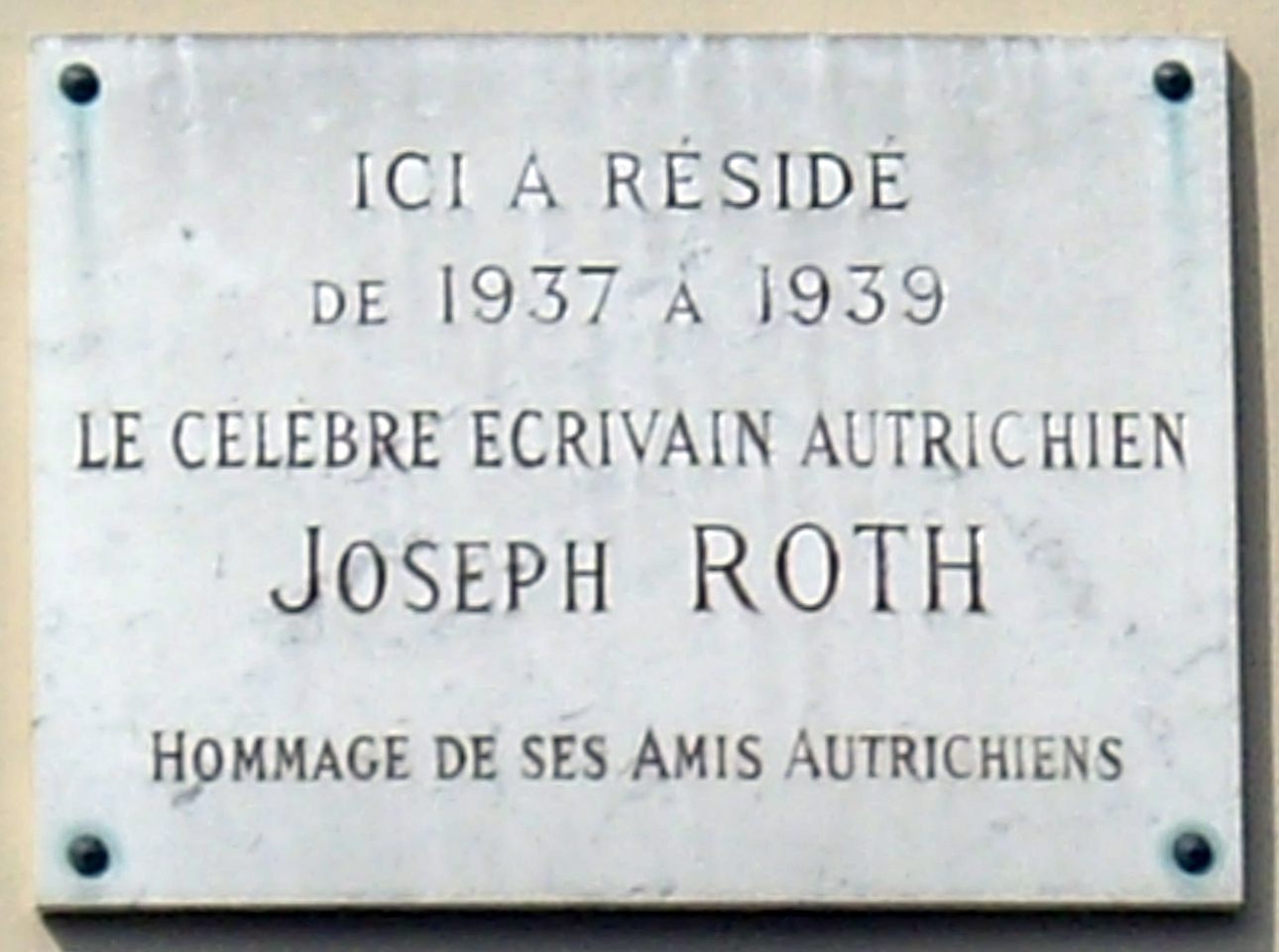
Plaque at no. 18 for Joseph Roth

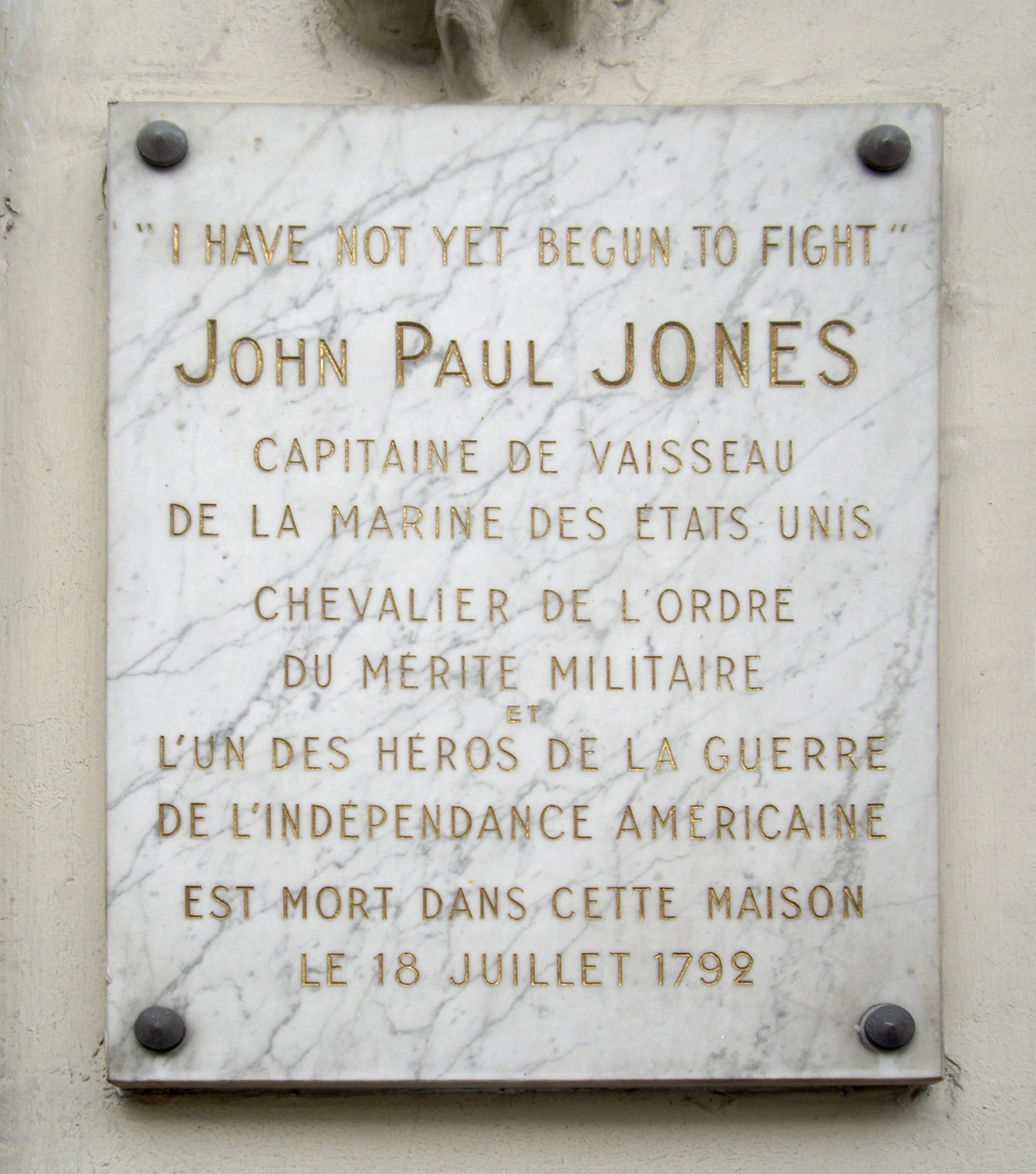
Plaque at no. 19 for John Paul Jones

== In art ==
- Maurice Asselin (1882–1947), La Rue de Tournon à Paris, displayed at the Musée Albert-André, Bagnols-sur-Cèze.

== See also ==
- Palais du Luxembourg
- Jardin du Luxembourg
- François de Tournon
- Saint-Germain-des-Prés
- French Resistance
- Paris Commune
