= John Lane (metallurgist) =

John Lane (c. October 1678 – 1741) was an 18th-century medical doctor and metallurgist, who is said to have experimented with making metallic zinc, probably without result.

He studied at Exeter College, Oxford, and medicine at Leiden in 1702. He married Elizabeth Pollard, heiress of Marsh Baldon, Oxfordshire in 1713, who survived him, only dying in 1771 at the age of 83.

In 1694, Lane and John Pollard (possibly his step father-in-law) became partners of Thomas Collins in copper works at Neath Abbey, but the partnership was dissolved in 1716. In 1717 Lane and Pollard established the Llangyfelach copper works at Landore near Swansea, but became bankrupt in 1726, a victim of the South Sea Bubble. His works "near Swansea", held for a long term of years, were advertised for sale in May 1727. The Llangefelach Works were subsequently used by Lockwood Morris & Co.

In addition, at some stage he had a stamping mill at Kidwelly, on the site later used for Kidwelly Tinplate Works. His partner had copper mines in Cornwall.

Lane seems to have lived at Bristol, where he was practising medicine by 1702. He participated in commercial life there, for example investing in a privateering venture from there in 1708 and in 1714 in the proposed navigation to Bath, for which see River Avon (Bristol). Despite his bankruptcy, he was able to lease a house in College Green, Bristol in 1728 and continued to practise medicine with a good reputation.
