= Lirquén =

- Town
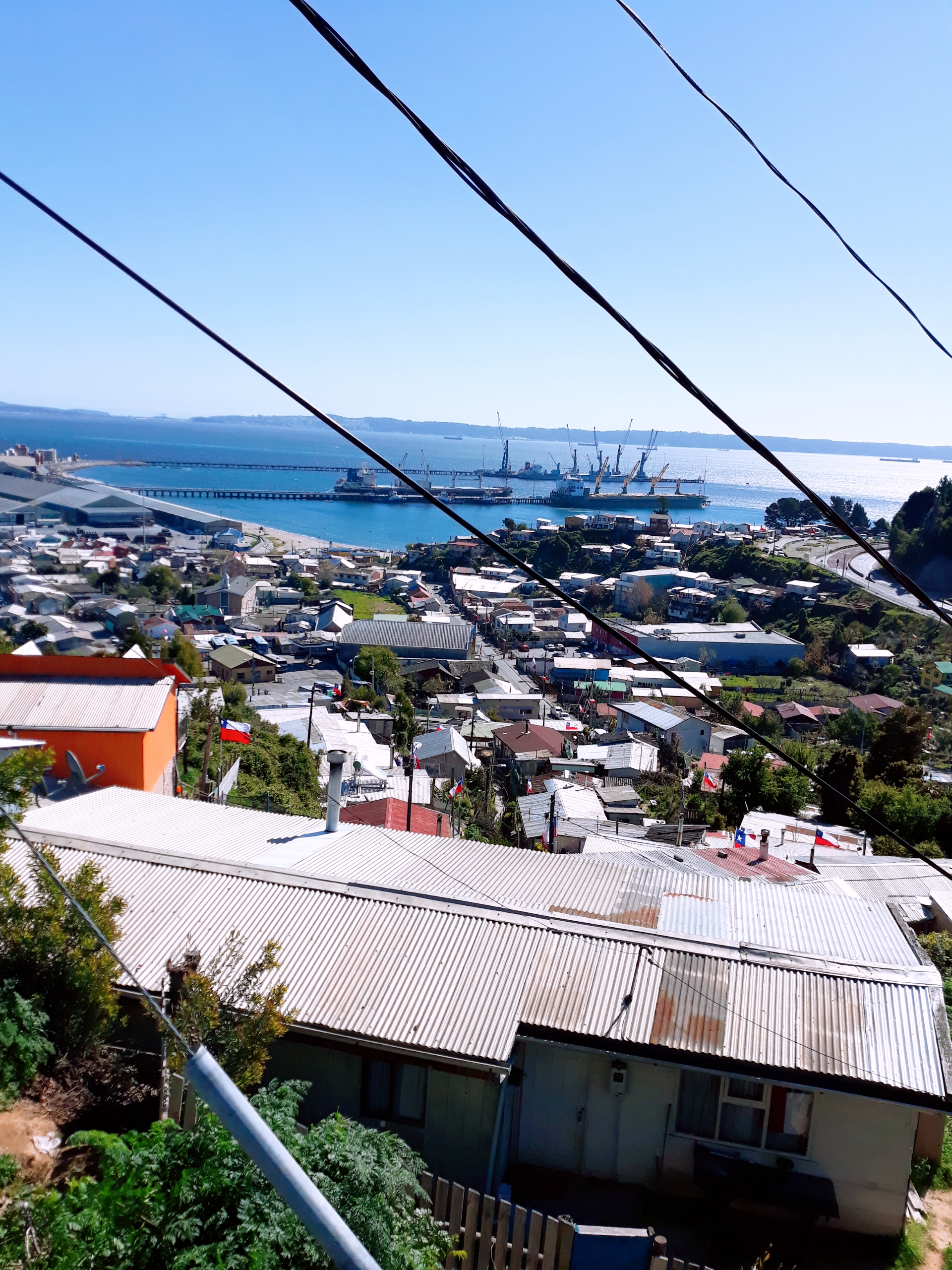
- Lirquén from Cerro Rahue

- Location within Chile
- Coordinates: 36°42′46″S 72°58′36″W
- Country: Chile
- Region: Biobío Region
- Province: Concepción
- Commune: Penco
- Established: 1850

Area
  - Total: 107.6 km^{2} (41.5 sq mi)
- Elevation: 11 m (36 ft)

Population
  - Total: 20,000
  - Density: 190/km^{2} (480/sq mi)
- Time zone: UTC−4 (CLT)
  - Summer (DST): UTC−3 (CLST)
- Area code: 56 + 41
- Climate: Dfc

Lirquén is a town located in the Biobío Region of central Chile. It is located along the Pacific Ocean and its economy is partly based on fishing. The town has a population of around 20,000 people.

Due to its location on the coast, Lirquén serves as a major cargo port for shipping traffic to Chile, with its main cargo terminal capable of handling 3 million tons of material per year.

== History ==
During the 19th and 20th centuries, Lirquén was a center for coal mining, a resource which was common around the region. The first mine was opened in 1843 by an English immigrant, alongside several copper smelting factories. The mines closed in 1958. In 1846 it was estimated that Fundición Lambert in La Serena and Joaquín Edwards' copper smelter in Lirquén produced together one third of the copper bars in Chile.

Lirquén suffered extensive damage during the 2026 Chilean wildfires, one of which originated in the town, resulting in around 80% of Lirquén being destroyed. The Chilean government ordered the evacuation of Lirquén during the emergency.
