= Fundición Lambert =

19th century copper smelter in La Serena

Coordinates: 29.889167°S 71.228889°W

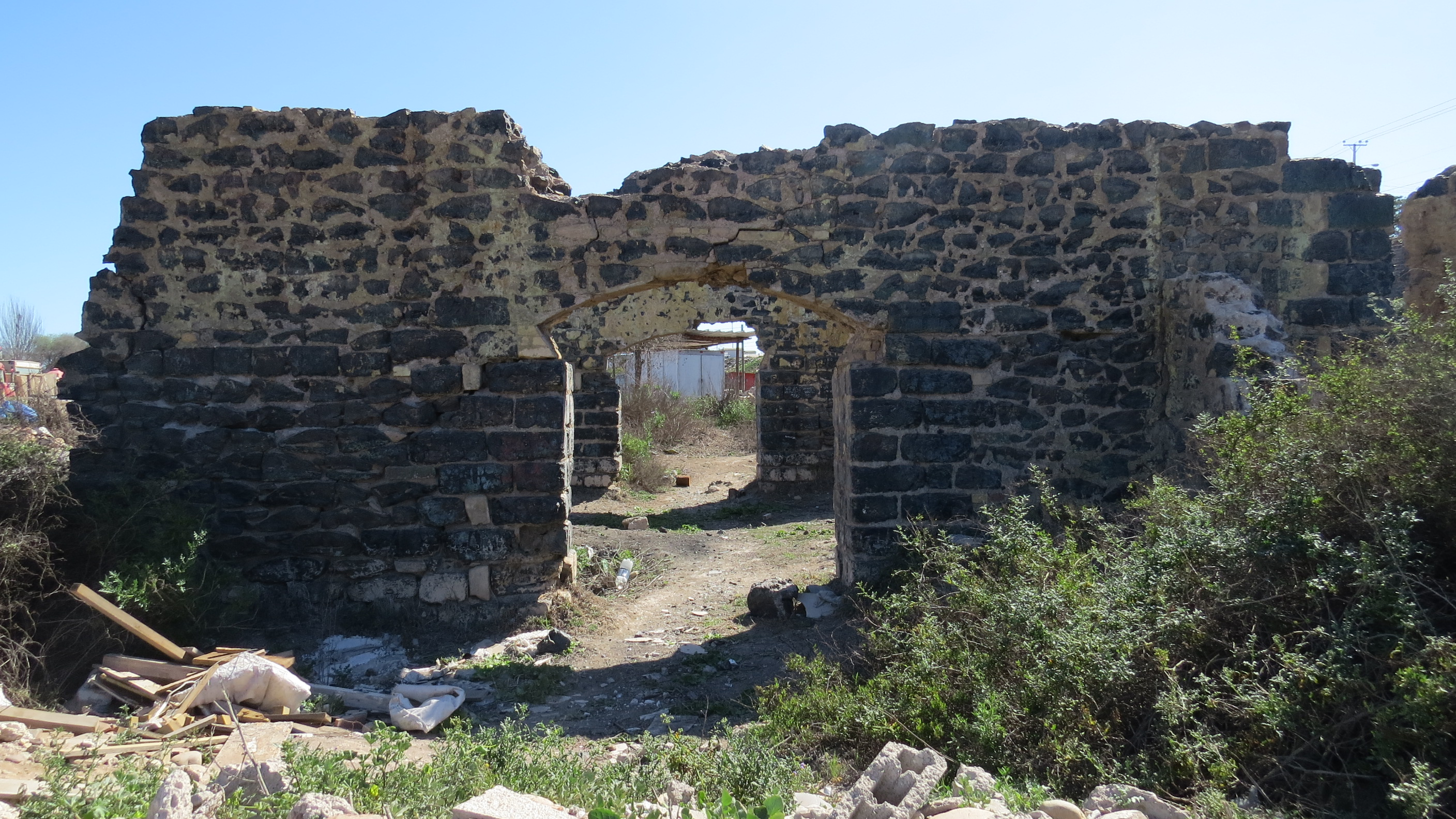
Ruins of Fundición Lambert as 2014.

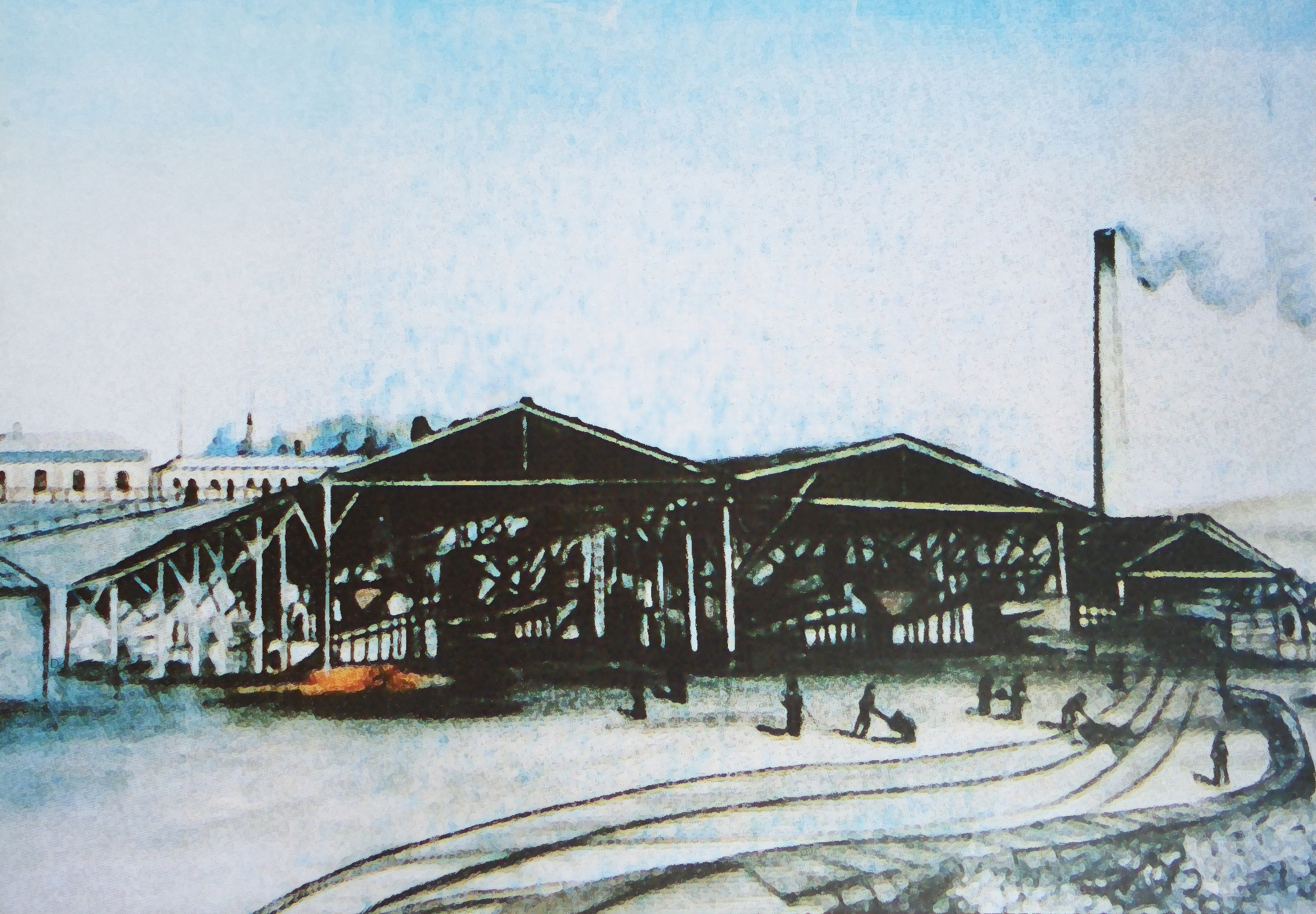
Drawing of Fundición Lambert.

Fundición Lambert also known as Ex-Fundición Lambert, Establecimiento de Fundición de La Compañía and El Escorial was a 19th century copper smelter in La Serena, Chile owned by Charles Saint Lambert. The smelter was built around 1840 and was arguably the first expression of the Industrial Revolution in Chile. From 1845 to 1847 the number of reverberatory furnaces at Fundición Lambert increased from five to nine. In 1846 it was estimated that Fundición Lambert and Joaquín Edwards' smelter at Lirquén produced together one third of the copper bars in Chile.

== See also ==
- Copper mining in Chile
- History of mining in Chile
- List of copper smelters in Chile
