= Charles Saint Lambert =

Franco-Chilean mining engineer and businessman

Charles Saint Lambert Carlos Santiago Lambert
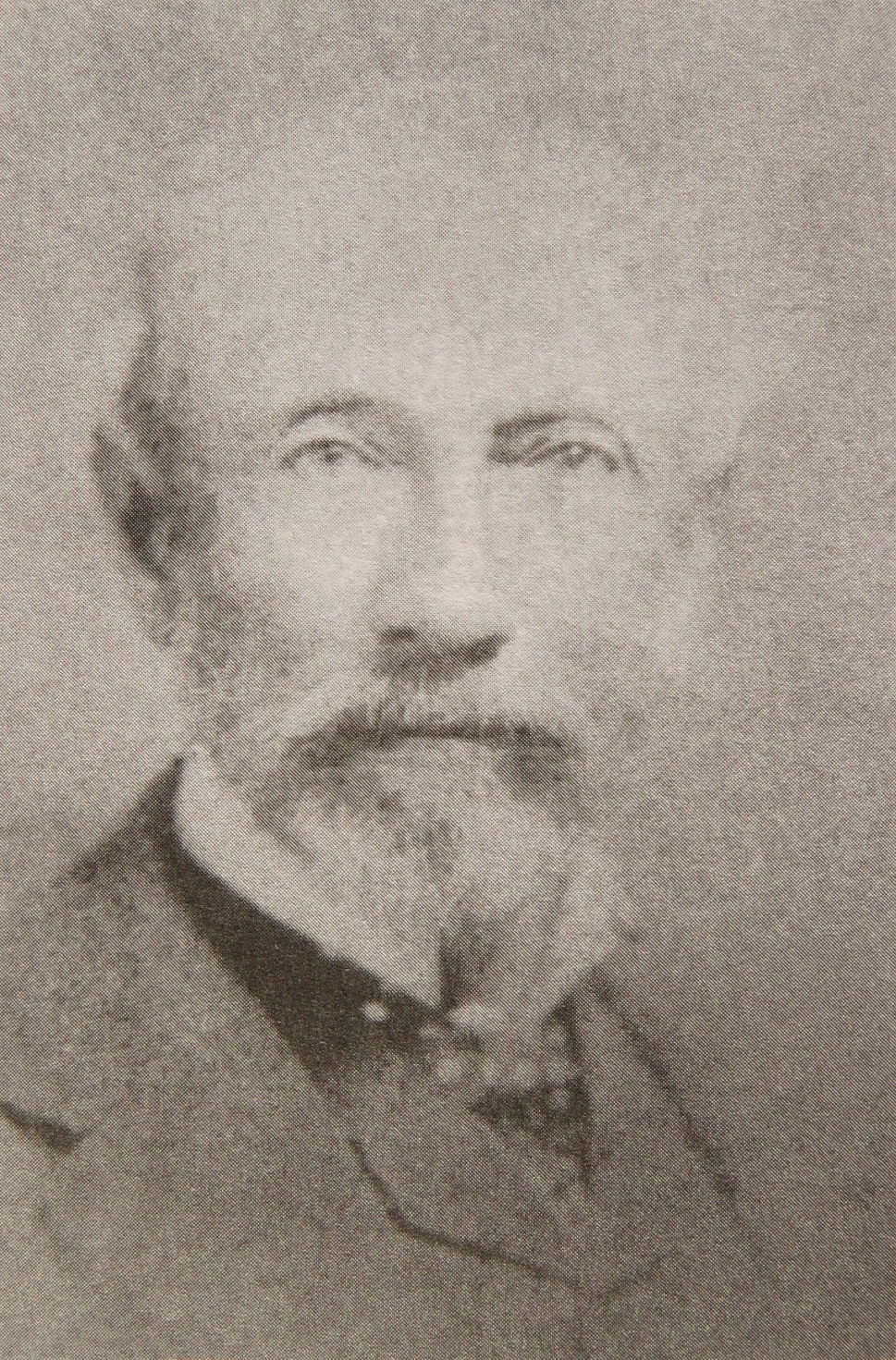
- Carlos Lambert
- Born: Charles Joseph Emile Lambert; 11 December 1793; Bruchsal, Prince-Bishopric of Speyer, Germany
- Died: 4 August 1876 (aged 82); Alltyferin (Pont-ar-Gothi), Carmarthenshire, Wales
- Education: École Polytechnique, Paris
- Occupations: Mining engineer and entrepreneur
- Spouse: Janet Spears (1801–1859)
- Children: Carlos José Lambert (1826–1888); Margaret Lambert/Bath (1827–1902); Robert Lambert (1829–1854); Eugenie Lambert/Bath (1831-1896); Hélène Elisabeth Lambert/Mark/Saulez (1834–1927): and others
- Parent(s): Joseph Mattieu Lambert (1759–1822); Charlotte Joachim

Charles Saint Lambert (identified in Spanish-language sources as Carlos Santiago Lambert: 31 December 1793 – 4 August 1876) was a Franco-Chilean mining engineer and businessman. He explored the mineral deposits in northern Chile and introduced the reverberatory furnace which transformed the Chilean copper mining industry by making it practical to exploit previously discarded aggregations of relatively low-grade copper slag. Copper production increased six-fold in just thirty years. Fundición Lambert, a copper smelter in La Serena built by Charles around 1840, was arguably the first expression of the Industrial Revolution in Chile.

Lambert was also the man who talent spotted and recruited the remarkable Polish-born scholar-mineralogist Ignacy Domeyko to take a post as Professor of Chemistry and Mineralogy at the Liceo Gregorio Cordovez (college) at La Serena (Coquimbo). Domeyko, who was living as a political exile in Alsace when Lambert communicated the job offer on behalf of the Chilean government, subsequently made a substantial contribution to science, scholarship and, more indirectly, social welfare in the nascent Chilean state.

== Life ==
=== Provenance and early years ===
On 31 December 1793 Charles Saint Lambert was born in Bruchsal, a small town near Lauterbourg where the family had been based since at least as far back as 1735. (Note: After he went abroad he took to telling people that he came from the better known city of Strasbourg, a short distance to the south.) He was the elder of his parents' two recorded sons. His father, Joseph Matthieu Lambert, was a physician who during the French Revolution became a member of the National Convention, France's revolutionary government, based in Paris. On 30 October 1810, still aged only 17, and after a measure of calm had returned to French streets, he himself attended another revolutionary institution, the prestigious École Polytechnique (Polytechnical college) in Paris, studying Metallurgy and Geology. During the latter part of Napoleon's time in power, Lambert worked for the army staff as an engineer. Immediately following the restoration he continued to work in France, mastering his trade as a mining engineer and acquiring the skills on which he would later build his fortune. He travelled to Chile for the first time in 1817, settling in Coquimbo the following year. In July 1818 Lambert obtained a permit by patriot authorities to put eight royalist prisoners of war into work.

=== Chilean mining pioneer and entrepreneur ===
The port of Coquimbo constituted a naturally formed export hub for the minerals mined in the region. Lambert worked as an agent for an English company that was keen to exploit the copper deposits. With his contract concluded, in 1820 he returned to Europe. On 12 February 1824 Charles Joseph Emile Lambert married Janet Spears. He was from Alsace and she was from Scotland. They married in London. The couple had met on 16 July 1824 during a stay in France and, according to Lambert, shared their first kiss on 15 August. Later during 1825 he returned to Chile with a contract from the newly incorporated "Chilean Mining Association" company to take charge of the Cerro Brillador copper mine. The "Chilean Mining Association" company soon collapsed, and Lambert continued to run the rapidly expanding copper mining operation, but now as its owner.

In 1825 he gave large loan to the Chilean government allowing the government to finance the invasion of Chiloé Archipelago, a Chilean territory still held by royalists.

He now introduced several important new technologies, notably the reverberatory furnace which transformed the Chilean copper mining industry by making it practical to exploit previously discarded aggregations of relatively low-grade copper slag. He installed a new copper foundry at "La Compañía", a large production site in La Serena, where he set up the first factory for manufacturing sulphuric acid and the first facility for laminating copper. It was also on this site that he constructed "Constitución", the first navy ship to be manufactured entirely in Chile. At least one source identifies "La Compañía" as the first company of the Chilean industrial revolution.

Through his combination of vision, skill and energy, by the middle of the nineteenth century Lambert had become one of South America's richest men.

=== Networking and family matters ===
In 1840 he met the copper entrepreneur and (of at least equal significance) ship owner Henry Bath while visiting Swansea: possibly the two men had by this time already worked with one another from their respective continents. Swansea, thanks to abundant local availability of coal with a high combustion temperature and — relatively — low levels of smoke emission, had been established since the early eighteenth century as the world's principal centre for copper smelting, but the supplies of copper ore from Cornwall on which the Swansea smelting business had grown up in the eighteenth century were not expected to last for ever. (Since, subje3ct to the quality of the ore, copper smelting required approximately three times as much copper ore as coal, it had been established that it was more efficient to transport the copper ore to smelting facilities with local coal availability than to transport three times its weight in coal in the other direction. It was from Swansea that Henry Bath ran his profitable shipping business which transported copper to Swansea. The two men immediately set about creating a series of family alliances. Charles Saint Lambert's elder son, Charles Joseph Lambert married Henry Bath's daughter Susan in 1847. Two of Lambert's daughters married sons of Henry Bath in 1846 and 1848. Despite his Chilean citizenship Lambert appears increasingly to have divided his time between Chile and Britain during the 1840s.

=== Chilean citizen ===
During the 1840s, having taken Chilean citizenship, Carlos Lambert emerged as a significant figure in Coquimbo province. He had held public office as regional intendent and as police commissioner in La Serena. Serious problems arose for him in connection with the La Serena uprising during the final months of 1851, however. He antagonised the leaders of the revolt by refusing to lend them his modern steam ship, "Fire Fly". The revolutionaries nevertheless confiscated "Fire Fly" which was a far more capable vessel than anything the Chilean navy could deploy. The rebels temporarily enjoyed mastery of the seas at a time when the Chilean rail infrastructure was still in its infancy. The seas were Chile's only effective long-distance communications channel. However, "Fire Fly" carried a British flag. Both for this reason and since most of Lambert's well rewarded investors were British, confiscation of "Fire Fly" brought the wrath of the British navy down on the rebels. The British paddle-sloop HMS Gorgon engaged in a succession of actions which were followed by the defeat of the revolt (and the recovery, for Carlos Lambert, of his steam ship). The longer term outcome of the uprising involved difficulties for many of the leading citizens of La Serena, most of whom had backed the local rebels in their confrontation with the authoritarian government from far away Santiago to the south. Carlos Lambert's presence was no longer welcome: there were also tempting opportunities in Europe. Lambert handed over control of his Chilean business interests to his eldest son and in late 1851 and/or early 1852 relocated to Swansea, still the world capital of the copper industry and home to his friend and business partner (and by now co-father in law to six of their married children), Henry Bath.

=== South Wales ===
Although, through his son, his family and commercial ties with Chile remained very strong, Charles Saint Lambert himself never returned to that country. In Swansea he purchased a large plot of land on the foreshore to the east of the city at Port Tennant, and overlooked by the Kilvey Hill. During or before 1852 this site became home to a copper smelting works, supplied with ore from Lambert's facilities in Chile and using (jealously guarded) smelting techniques that Lambert had honed during his years in Coquimbo. The business would later be taken forward by his son, Charles Joseph Lambert in partnership with his son-in-law, Edward Bath. It eventually employed (and provided housing for) 350 workers. That business ended in failure during the 1920s, however. The coal-burning reverberatory furnaces which Lambert had introduced to Chile quickly became commonplace in the country's copper belt. In the five years following 1842 copper smelting in South America increased five times over. By 1872 there were one hundred "smelting works" in Chile. Although Chile was a major copper producer (and by 2017 had become the world's largest), other countries under Britain's commercial influence, notably Australia, followed Chile's example. Their gain was Swansea's loss. In that sense, Lambert's formidable success in modernising the Chilean copper industry during the second quarter of the nineteenth century sowed the seeds for the later demise of his own copper smelting business (among others) in his adopted home-city of Swansea.

Charles Saint Lambert died and was buried during the summer of 1876 at Alltyferin (Pont-ar-Gothi), the Bath family estate, some 40 miles / 65 kilometers inland from Swansea, and the home of his recently widowed daughter, Margaret Bath. He was 82. According to a local newspaper obituary of his eldest son (who also died on the family estate, just twelve years later), the elder Charles Lambert "left behind him the reputation of having been a millionaire". His wife Janet had predeceased him in 1859.

== Trivia ==
Charles Lambert was an intensely secretive man, both about the techniques he applied to copper smelting and about his personal life. Family sources nevertheless focus on certain perceived eccentricities. A favourite dish was "cabbage sprinkled with sulphur".
