= Carlos José Lambert =

Chilean-born mining entrepreneur and engineer

Charles Joseph Lambert
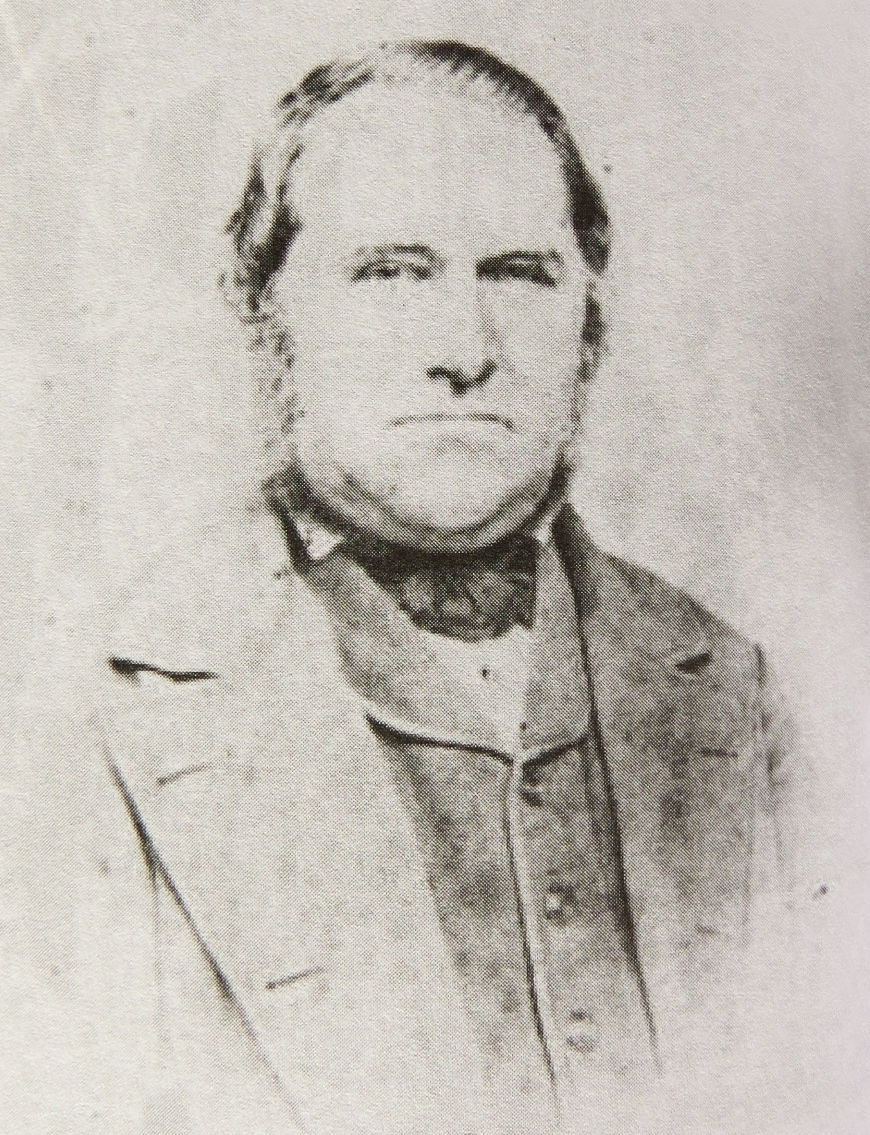
- Born: Carlos José Lambert c. 1826; La Serena, Chile
- Died: 11 July 1888; Cowes, Isle of Wight, England
- Occupations: Mining engineer Mining entrepreneur
- Spouse: Susan Bath 1829–1898
- Children: 1. Catherine Susan Lambert/Clutterbuck; 1849–1915: 2. Charles L. Lambert; 1851–1874: 3. Janet Spears Lambert/Black; 1852–?: 4. Henry Bath Lambert; 1853–1892: 5. Margaret Lambert; 1856–1892: 6. Robert Spears Lambert; 1858–1902: 7. Helen Mark Lambert/Levett; 1864–?: 8. Beatrice Kate Lambert; ?–?: 9. George Maximiano Lambert; 1868–1891: 10. William Stanley Lambert; 1869–1907
- Parent(s): Charles Saint Lambert 1793–1876 Janet Spears 1801–1859

Charles Joseph Lambert or Carlos José Lambert (c. 1826–1888) was a Chilean-born mining entrepreneur and engineer.

== Life ==
=== Family provenance and early years ===
Carlos José Lambert is believed to have been born in or near La Serena. However, surviving records of his birth and baptism have not been identified. (In the 1820s members of the European expatriate community frequently attended to baptismal formalities not in Roman Catholic churches onshore, but on British ships moored offshore.)

His father Charles Saint Lambert (1793–1876), was a prominent, and increasingly prosperous, mining entrepreneur who had been born near Strasbourg and emigrated to Chile in 1817. He established contacts in England, acquired British nationality and returned to Chile in 1823 as a representative of a British company called the "Chilean Mining Association", which later went bankrupt. The career of Charles Saint Lambert (the father) continued to prosper, however. Little is known of his mother, who is frequently described as "English", although at least one source indicates that she was born further north, in Scotland.

Charles Joseph Lambert spent much of his childhood in Britain. Around 1840 his father relocated the family base to Swansea which was becoming the principal smelting centre for industrial scale copper (and other) ores from Chile, following the exhaustion of principal mines closer to hand in Cornwall. In Swansea he was involved in regular commercial negotiations with Edward Bath, scion of a major industrial family in the area (and subsequently his brother-in-law twice over). In practice, he appears to have divided his time between Chile and South Wales throughout his working life.

=== Activities in Chile ===
As a mining engineer he exploited new copper-smelting technology employing "coal-using reverbatory furnaces" which his father had introduced to Chile during or before the 1830s and which at this stage gave an important competitive advantage. He was also active as a farmer, with an extensive property in the valley of the Rapel River, centred on a Welsh style farmhouse. This farm also included silver deposits which he exploited.

He actively promoted the construction of the railway connecting La Serena with the port of Coquimbo, taking a significant shareholding in the project, which also linked up two of the family's smelting locations. He promoted the exploitation of sheep imported from England and Australia, as well as raising sheep himself. In La Serena he also backed the drainage project, proposing the construction of a canal to divert water from the Elqui River to an outlet near the port which would drain the coastal area of the Bay of Coquimbo.

At the start of the Pacific War in 1879 he is identified as the originator of fortifications along the Bay of Coquimbo. This involved (at least) three gun emplacements covering the bay. There were good strategic reasons to protect the port in order to avoid the interruption of the transport of ores from the Lambert mines to the industrial processing plants in Swansea and to prevent an attack on the domestic smelting works at "La Compañía", a couple of kilometers inland from the bay. It was thought likely that Peruvian forces would attempt to paralyse the mining industry in the region which was seen as vital to sustaining the economy in wartime.

=== Philanthropy ===
Lambert was an active philanthropist, funding the construction and operation of hospitals in La Serena and Vicuña. He funded the health commission to combat cholera and smallpox. At Christmas he was in the habit of appearing on the city streets accompanied by his family loaded with parcels for distribution to the poor families of La Serena.

=== Round the world in 713 days ===
On 5 May 1880, embarking from Cowes on the Isle of Wight (England), Charles Joseph Lambert set sail aboard the company yacht for a round the world trip, accompanied by his wife, their four youngest children, a governess, a nurse, a maid, a valet, a footman, a minister of the church and an artist called Robert Prichett. Their boat, "The Wanderer", was coal powered, also capable of sail propulsion when the wind blew appropriately. Lambert kept a detailed record of the adventure in which he recorded that 12651/2 (British) tons were consumed by the voyage. The ship was operated by 8 officers and 35 crewmen (not necessarily all at once) and the staff also included 7 ships' stewards. It may have been this voyage that inspired William Stanley Lambert, the couple's youngest son, who celebrated his eleventh and twelfth birthdays during the voyage, regarding his subsequent decision to join the British navy, which he did in 1885.

During the voyage the family were able to visit Hawaii to pay their respects to their dead son Carlos who had drowned there on 20 November 1870 while serving in the navy. The family had already erected a memorial to their dead son back home at "La Compañía" outside La Serena, and now they were able to erect another "cenotaph" with a cross near the site of his death.

=== Death ===
Charles Joseph Lambert himself died on 11 July 1888. He suffered "an epidemic of ‘choleric diarrhoea’" and booked a passage on a steamship to Liverpool where he spent his final months staying in an hotel beside the Royal Yacht Club. The actual death took place not in Liverpool, however, but at Cowes on the Isle of Wight.
