= Reverberatory furnace =

Metallurgical furnace

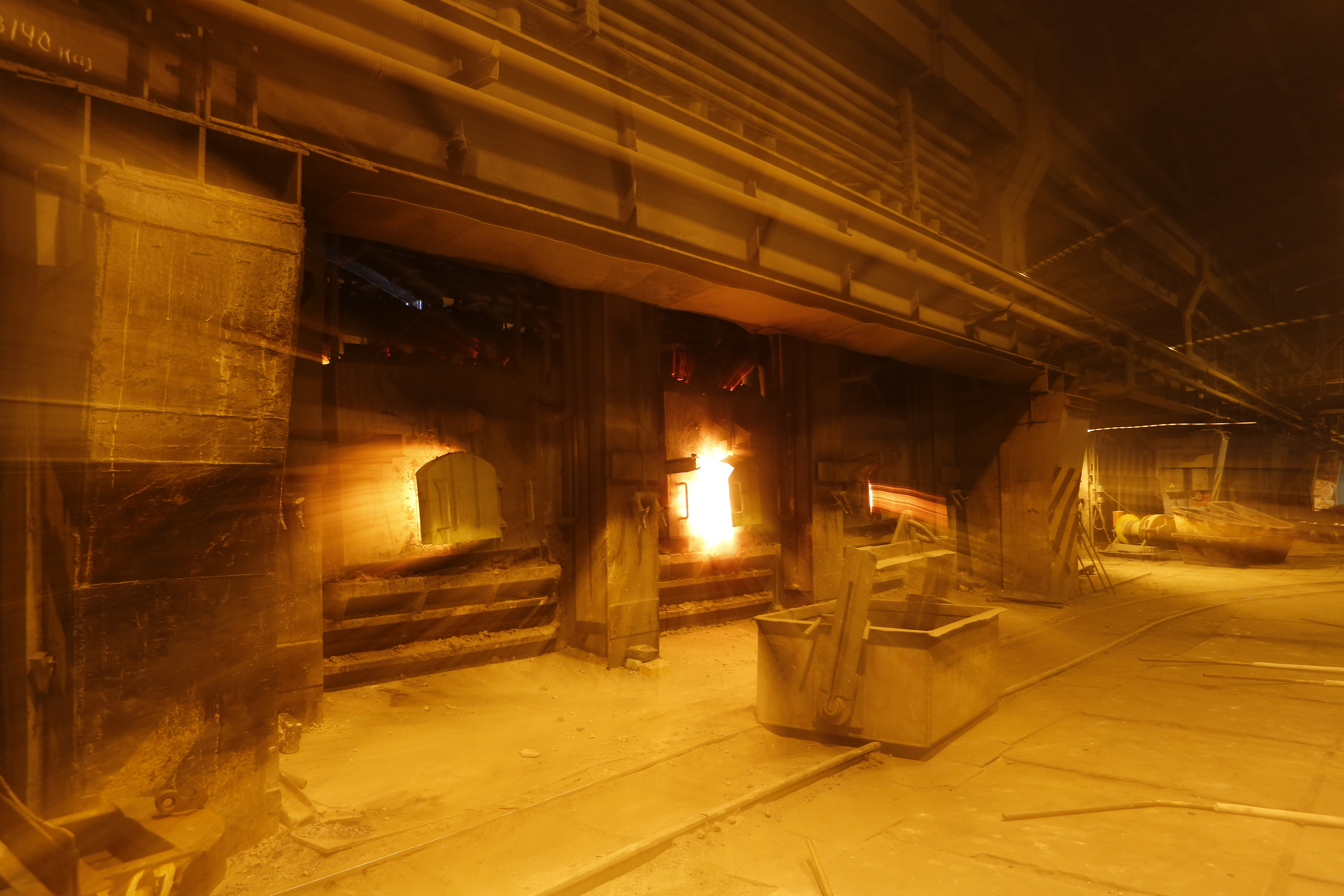
Reverberatory furnace for copper at Ural Mining and Metallurgical Company's factory in Russia

A reverberatory furnace is a metallurgical or process furnace that isolates the material being processed from contact with the fuel, but not from contact with combustion gases. The term reverberation is used here in a generic sense of rebounding or reflecting, not in the acoustic sense of echoing.

== Operation ==
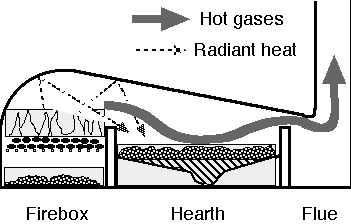
Reverberatory furnace

Chemistry determines the optimum relationship between the fuel and the material, among other variables. The reverberatory furnace can be contrasted with the blast furnace, in which fuel and material are mixed in a single chamber, and with crucible, muffling, or retort furnaces, in which the subject material is isolated from the fuel and all of the products of combustion including gases and flying ash. There are, however, a great many furnace designs, and the terminology of metallurgy has not been very consistently defined, so it is difficult to categorically contradict other views.

The applications of these devices fall into two general categories: metallurgical melting furnaces, and lower temperature processing furnaces typically used for metallic ores and other minerals.

A reverberatory furnace is at a disadvantage from the standpoint of efficiency compared to a blast furnace due to the separation of the burning fuel and the subject material, and it is necessary to effectively utilize both reflected radiant heat and direct contact with the exhaust gases (convection) to maximize heat transfer. Historically these furnaces have used solid fuel, and bituminous coal has proven to be the best choice. The brightly visible flames, due to the substantial volatile component, give more radiant heat transfer than anthracite coal or charcoal.

Contact with the products of combustion, which may add undesirable elements to the subject material, is used to advantage in some processes. Control of the fuel/air balance can alter the exhaust gas chemistry toward either an oxidizing or a reducing mixture, and thus alter the chemistry of the material being processed. For example, cast iron can be puddled in an oxidizing atmosphere to convert it to the lower-carbon mild steel or bar iron. The Siemens-Martin oven in open hearth steelmaking is also a reverberatory furnace.

Reverberatory furnaces (in this context, usually called air furnaces) were formerly also used for melting brass, bronze, and pig iron for foundry work. They were also, for the first 75 years of the 20th century, the dominant smelting furnace used in copper production, treating either roasted calcine or raw copper sulfide concentrate. While they have been supplanted in this role, first by flash furnaces and more recently also by the Ausmelt and ISASMELT furnaces, they are very effective at producing slags with low copper losses.

== History ==
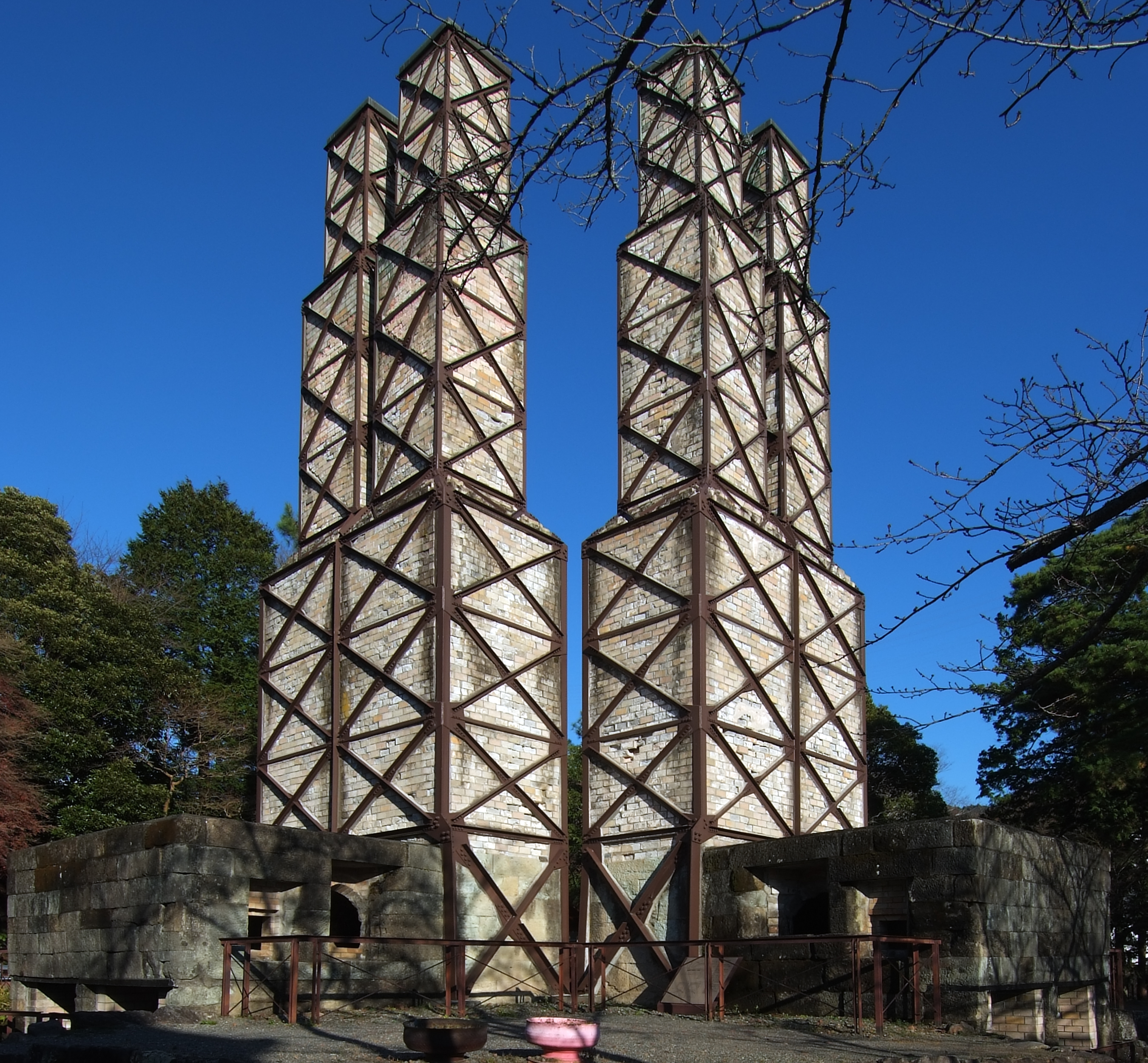
A reverberatory furnace in Izunokuni, Japan

The first reverberatory furnaces were perhaps in the medieval period, and were used for melting bronze for casting bells. The earliest known detailed description was provided by Biringuccio. They were first applied to smelting metals in the late 17th century. Sir Clement Clerke and his son Talbot built cupolas or reverberatory furnaces in the Avon Gorge below Bristol in about 1678. In 1687, while obstructed from smelting lead (by litigation), they moved on to copper. In the following decades, reverberatory furnaces were widely adopted for smelting these metals and also tin. They had the advantage over older methods that the fuel was mineral coal, not charcoal or 'white coal' (chopped dried wood).

In the 1690s, they (or associates) applied the reverberatory furnace (in this case known as an air furnace) to melting pig iron for foundry purposes. This was used at Coalbrookdale and various other places, but became obsolete at the end of the 18th century with the introduction of the foundry cupola furnace, which was a kind of small blast furnace, and a quite different species from the reverberatory furnace.

The puddling furnace, introduced by Henry Cort in the 1780s to replace the older finery process, was also a variety of reverberatory furnace.

Reverberatory furnaces were introduced to Chile around 1830 by Charles Saint Lambert. This revolutionized Chilean copper mining to such degree that the country came to supply 19% of the copper produced worldwide in the 19th century. The use of mineral coal instead charcoal in reverberatory furnances introduced by Saint Lambert also meant there was not longer a dependency on the scarce firewood to be found on Atacama Desert and its surrounding semi-arid areas as was the case with earlier smelting technology. By 1872 there were one hundred "smelting works" in Chile. Competition stemming from new processing techniques pushed Chilean copper production in the late 19th century back to represent 6% of the worldwide production, reaching a low of 4.3% in 1914.

== Aluminium melting ==
Reverberatory furnaces are widely used to melt secondary aluminium scrap for eventual use by die-casting industries.

The simplest reverberatory furnace is nothing more than a steel box lined with alumina refractory brick with a flue at one end and a vertically lifting door at the other. Conventional oil or gas burners are placed usually on either side of the furnace to heat the brick and the eventual bath of molten metal is then poured into a casting machine to produce ingots.

== See also ==
- Open-hearth furnace
- Puddling furnace
