= Lambart =

Lambart is a surname. Notable people with the surname include:

- Charles Lambart, 1st Earl of Cavan PC (Ire) (1600–1660), MP for the rotten borough of Bossiney and a military commander
- Charles Lambart, 3rd Earl of Cavan (1649–1702), inherited the Earldom of Cavan in 1690 from Richard Lambart, 2nd Earl of Cavan
- Evelyn Lambart (1914–1999), Canadian animator and technical director with the National Film Board of Canada
- Ford Lambart, 5th Earl of Cavan (1718–1772), Irish peer and freemason
- Rudolph Lambart, 10th Earl of Cavan, KP, GCB, GCMG, GCVO, GBE (1865–1946), British Army commander during WWI
- Frederick Lambart, 8th Earl of Cavan (born 1815), hereditary peer
- Frederick Lambart, 9th Earl of Cavan KP, PC (1839–1900), Irish peer who served in the Royal Navy and as a Liberal politician
- Horace Lambart, 11th Earl of Cavan (1878–1950), soldier and priest
- Michael Lambart, 12th Earl of Cavan (1911–1988), hereditary peer
- Oliver Lambart, 1st Baron Lambart (died 1618), military commander and an MP in the Irish House of Commons
- Richard Lambart, 2nd Earl of Cavan (1628–1691), Member of Parliament for Kilbeggan between 1647 and 1649
- Richard Lambart, 4th Earl of Cavan PC (I) (died 1742), inherited the Earldom of Cavan in 1702 from Charles Lambart, 3rd Earl of Cavan
- Richard Lambart, 6th Earl of Cavan (died 1778), Anglo-Irish peer and soldier
- Richard Lambart, 7th Earl of Cavan (1763–1837), military commander throughout the Napoleonic era and beyond
