= Richard Lambart =

Richard Lambart may refer to:

- Richard Lambart, 2nd Earl of Cavan (1628–1691), Member of Parliament for Kilbeggan
- Richard Lambart, 4th Earl of Cavan (died 1742), Irish peer
- Richard Lambart, 6th Earl of Cavan (died 1778), Anglo-Irish peer and soldier
- Richard Lambart, 7th Earl of Cavan (1763 – 1837), British military commander throughout the Napoleonic era and beyond

== See also ==
- Richard Lambert (disambiguation)
