= Lady Edith Foxwell =

British socialite and eccentric (1918-1996)

- Born: Edith Sybil Lambart; 11 June 1918
- Died: 31 March 1996 (aged 77)
- Other names: The Queen of London; Disco Dowager
- Spouse: Ivan Foxwell (m. 1940; div. 1976)
- Children: 2
- Relatives: Frederick Lambart, 9th Earl of Cavan (paternal grandfather); Horace Lambart, 11th Earl of Cavan (paternal uncle)

Lady Edith Foxwell (born Edith Sybil Lambart; 11 June 1918 – 31 March 1996) was a British socialite and eccentric known as "The Queen of London Cafe Society" and as the "Disco Dowager", in the 1970s and early 1980s. In 1981, she became an investor in London's Embassy Club, where celebrities mixed with the aristocracy.

== Life ==
She was born Edith Sybil Lambart on 11 June 1918, the daughter of Captain Hon. Lionel John Olive Lambart, son of the 9th Earl of Cavan, and Adelaide Douglas Randolph. In 1940 she married the film producer Ivan Foxwell, among whose movies was The Colditz Story (1955). After her uncle, Horace Lambart, inherited the earldom of Cavan, she was granted the rank of a daughter of an earl by Royal Warrant of Precedence in 1947.

In her role as a producer's wife she began meeting many celebrities and showed the forcefulness of her personality when she locked the Welsh poet Dylan Thomas in a room for five days, forcing him to remain sober long enough to complete a film script that her husband was producing. She also used to lunch regularly with Noël Coward when he was in London.

She was one of the few members of London society who remained close friends with Margaret, Duchess of Argyll after the "headless man" scandal which, combined with the Profumo affair involving Christine Keeler, threatened to topple the Government of the day.

In the 1970s she began running the Embassy Club in Mayfair, which was London's first modern New York City–style nightclub and which attracted many celebrities, including Marvin Gaye, who became a frequent guest at Lady Edith's estate at Sherston, Wiltshire. The Sherston house became notorious for its sex and drugs parties attended by a mixture of show business celebrities and members of the aristocracy.

It was reported, in the April 2004 issue of GQ magazine, that Lady Foxwell and Marvin Gaye had an affair. The report quoted writer/composer Bernard J. Taylor as saying he was told by Foxwell that she and Gaye had discussed marriage before his death.

Lady Edith divorced Ivan Foxwell in 1976, after the couple had two daughters, Zia and Atalanta. The latter married Prince Stefano Massimo of Roccasecca (b.1955, son of actress Dawn Addams).

== The Embassy Club ==
Lady Edith Foxwell was an investor in a consortium that bought the club in 1981, which was headed by Stephen Hayter, the manager of the club under its previous owner. The Embassy had been revived spectacularly by Jeremy Norman, opening in 1978 at almost the same time as the dance film Saturday Night Fever premiered. The Club opened with a star-studded fashion show by Ossie Clark, where guests included Lady Diana Cooper and Margaret Campbell, Duchess of Argyll. Norman employed Michael Fish, the men's fashion designer and society darling, as his "greeter". The club was an instant success and its heyday lasted for about two years until the fashion for Disco faded in 1980. During the period of Norman's ownership, the Embassy played host to nearly all the prominent names in the entertainment, fashion and young society worlds – a melting pot and crossroads of many cultures. As at New York's Studio 54, everyone came out to party, young and old, including many who had never come out on the scene before.
