= Frederick Lambart =

Frederick Lambart may refer to:

- Frederick Lambart, 8th Earl of Cavan (1815–1887)
- Frederick Lambart, 9th Earl of Cavan (1839–1900), Irish soldier and politician
- Rudolph Lambart, 10th Earl of Cavan (Frederick Rudolph Lambart, 1865–1946), British Army officer
