= Dawn Addams =

English actress (1930–1985)

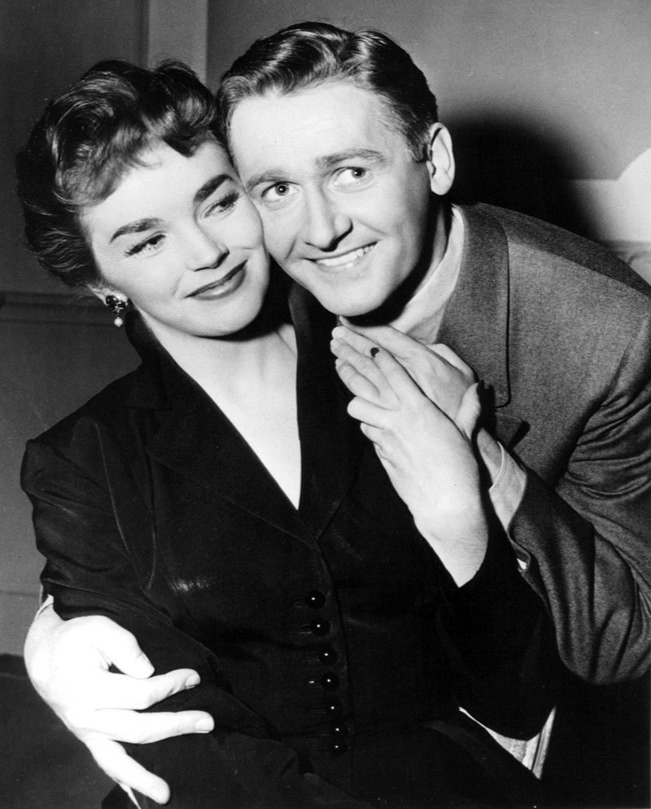
- Addams with Alan Young in the television show The Alan Young Show, 1953.
- Born: Victoria Dawn Addams; 21 September 1930; Felixstowe, Suffolk, England
- Died: 7 May 1985 (aged 54); London, England
- Occupation: Actress
- Years active: 1951–83
- Title: Princess of Roccasecca dei Volsci
- Spouses: Vittorio Emanuele Massimo (m. 1954; div. 1971) Jimmy White (m. 1974)
- Children: 2
- Relatives: Lady Edith Foxwell (sister-in-law)
- Family: Massimo (via marriage)

Victoria Dawn Addams (21 September 1930 – 7 May 1985) was an English actress. She worked steadily in American films during the 1950s, and was later a regular on British television. She married into the noble Italian Massimo family in 1954, and held the title Princess of Roccasecca dei Volsci.

== Early years ==
Addams was the daughter of James Ramage Addams (1904-1990) and his Irish wife Ethel Mary Hickie (1903-1936), born in Suffolk on 21 September 1930. Her father was a Flight-Lieutenant in the RAF, and son of artists Clifford Isaac Addams and Inez Eleanor Bate, and after Ethel's death he married the actress Arline Judge. Dawn's mother was a native of Cork and was married to Arthur Thistlethwaite until they divorced in 1927; she died in April 1936 when Dawn was just five years old.

== Career ==
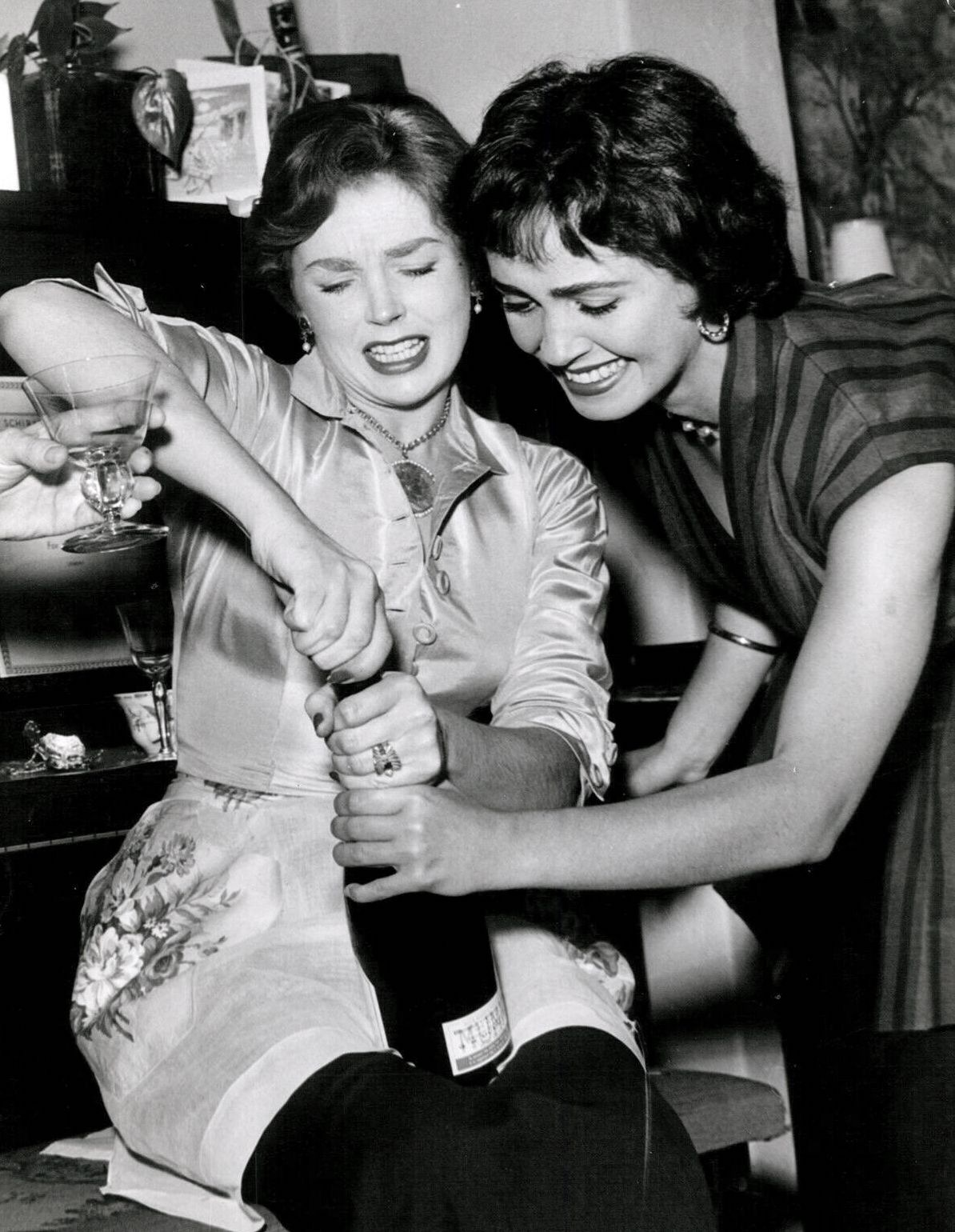
Dawn Addams and Susan Cabot, 1953

Addams' face and physique attracted the attention of talent agents. In December 1950, she signed a seven-year contract with Metro-Goldwyn-Mayer studios. Her film career began with a role in Night into Morning (1951), and her subsequent MGM films included Singin' in the Rain (1952), Plymouth Adventure (1952), Young Bess (1953) and the female lead opposite Peter Lawford in The Hour of 13 (1952). She played David Niven's daughter in The Moon Is Blue (1953). She also embarked on a USO tour the same year to help entertain troops in Korea. She worked steadily in films during the remainder of the 1950s, including a heavily publicised role as Richard Carlson's model girlfriend in the science fiction film Riders to the Stars (1954) and the female lead opposite actor-director-filmmaker legend Charlie Chaplin in his final comedy to star himself, A King in New York (1957). During the 1960s and 1970s, she appeared mainly in British TV shows and French films.

She was a semi-regular on the instructional series En France (1962) and the leading lady in several episodes of The Saint (1962–69), which starred Roger Moore as Simon Templar. In 1968 she guest starred in the episode Handicap Dead of the classic spy-fi series Department S.

Among her last film credits were two British horror films, The Vampire Lovers (1970) and The Vault of Horror (1973), and she was also a regular in the British sitcom Father, Dear Father (1971–1973). One of her last television roles was in the science fiction serial Star Maidens (1977). Addams retired in the early 1980s, dividing her remaining years between Europe and the United States.

== Personal life ==
She married Italian nobleman Don Vittorio Emanuele Massimo, Prince of Roccasecca dei Volsci, in 1954; the wedding was the subject of a cover story in Life magazine. Their son, Prince Stefano, married Atalanta Foxwell, daughter of film producer Ivan Foxwell and Lady Edith (Lambart), granddaughter of the 9th Earl of Cavan.

=== Death ===
Addams died in 1985 in a London hospital at age 54 from lung cancer.

== Legacy ==
A biography of Addams edited by James Pepper, based on an interview of Addams by John Francis Lane, was published in May 2024 as Dawn Addams - My Life As Chaplin's Leading Lady.

== Filmography ==
=== Film ===
Year	Title	Role	Notes
1951	Night into Morning	Dotty Phelps	
1951	The Unknown Man	Ellie Fansworth	
1952	Singin' in the Rain	Teresa	Uncredited
1952	The Hour of 13	Jane Frensham	
1952	Plymouth Adventure	Priscilla Mullins	
1953	Young Bess	Kate Howard	
1953	The Moon Is Blue	Cynthia Slater	
1953	Die Jungfrau auf dem Dach	Cynthia Slater	
1953	The Robe	Junia	
1954	Riders to the Stars	Susan Manners	
1954	Mizar	Mizar	
1954	The Bed	Janet	
1954	Return to Treasure Island	Jamesina 'Jamie' Hawkins	
1954	Khyber Patrol	Diana Rivington	
1954	The Count of Bragelonne	Hélène de Winter	
1955	Rommel's Treasure	Sofia	
1955	I quattro del getto tonante	Moglie di Rovi	
1956	The House of Intrigue	Mary	
1957	A King in New York	Ann Kay	
1958	The Silent Enemy	Third Officer Jill Masters, W.R.N.S.	
1959	The Scarlet Baroness	Szaga de Bor	
1959	Temptation Island	Victoria	
1959	Pensione Edelweiss	Nadia Rakesy	
1959	Prisoner of the Volga	Irina Tatyana	
1959	The Treasure of San Teresa	Hedi von Hartmann	
1959	The Black Chapel	Tilla Turner	
1959	Secret professionnel	Dr. Catherine Langeac	
1959	Come Dance with Me	Anita Florès	
1960	Die zornigen jungen Männer	Irene	
1960	The Two Faces of Dr. Jekyll	Kitty Jekyll	
1960	The Thousand Eyes of Dr. Mabuse	Marion Menil	
1961	House of Sin / The Liars	Norma O'Brien	
1961	Follow That Man	Janet Clark	
1962	Sentimental Education	Catherine Dambreuse	
1963	Come Fly with Me	Katie Rinard	
1964	The Black Tulip	Marquise Catherine de Vigogne	
1965	Ballad in Blue	Gina Graham	
1966	Where the Bullets Fly	Felicity 'Fiz' Moonlight	
1969	Zeta One	Zeta	
1970	The Vampire Lovers	The Countess	
1971	Sapho ou la Fureur d'aimer	Marianne	
1973	The Vault of Horror	Inez	

=== Television ===
Year	Title	Role	Notes
1950	The Alan Young Show	Kay Prindall	Sketch comedy
1953	Racket Squad	Betty Grant	Episode: "The Case of Lady Luck"
1955	Sherlock Holmes	Doreen Meredith	Episode: "The Case of the Careless Suffragette"
1956	I Tre moschettieri	Alvina - Countess of Aragon	Episode: "The Hapsburg Hare"
1959	Sunday Night Theatre	Epifania Fitzfassenden	Episode: "The Millionairess"
1959	The Third Man	Eva	Episode: "Barcelona Passage"
1959	ITV Play of the Week	Jane Lockridge	Episode: "Sweet Poison"
1962	Edgar Wallace Mysteries	Maxine Hagen	Episode: "The £20,000 Kiss"
1963-66	The Saint	Magda Vamoff, Countess Audrey Morova, Queen Adana	Episode: "The Fellow Traveller", "The Lawless Lady", "The Queen's Ransom"
1964	Danger Man	Martine/Gerdi	Episodes: "The Battle Of The Cameras" and "Fish on the Hook"
1967	Emergency Ward 10	Diane Parker	Episode: "Second Sight"
1969	Department S	Dianne Lynne	Episode: "Handicap Dead"
1969	Playhouse	Alma Rostalba	Episode: "Romans and Friends"
1970	Armchair Theatre	Margo	Episode: "A Room in Town"
1970	Ryan International	Francoise Albert	Episode: "Evidence of Murder"
1971	Armchair Theatre	Cynthia Fenton	Episode: "The Bargain Hunters"
1971-73	Father, Dear Father	Georgie Thompson	Series regular
1972	The Troubleshooters	Lady Diana	Episode: "Whatever Became of the Year 2000?"
1972	Crime of Passion	Therese	Episode: "Therese"
1972	Sez Les		1 episode
1973	The Adventurer	Lady Anne Benson	Episode: "The Case of the Poisoned Pawn"
1974	Dial M for Murder	Sybil Willis	Episode: "Murder on Demand"
1976	Star Maidens	Clara	5 episodes
1977	Crossroads	Katherine Lambert	1 episode
1983	Triangle	Mrs. Landers	Recurring role
