= Lambart baronets =

Extinct baronetcy in the Baronetage of the United Kingdom

The Lambart baronetcy, of Beau Parc in the County of Meath, was a title in the Baronetage of the United Kingdom. It was created on 13 July 1911 for Gustavus Lambart, the former Comptroller and Chamberlain to the Lord-Lieutenant of Ireland. The title became extinct on the death of his son, the 2nd Baronet, in 1986.

== Lambart baronets, of Beau Parc (1911) ==
- Sir Gustavus Francis Lambart, 1st Baronet (1848–1926)
- Oliver Francis Lambart, 2nd Baronet (1913–1986), left no heir.

== Extended family ==
Beau Parc House, 2007 photograph

The 1st Baronet was a descendant of the Hon. Oliver Lambart, member of the Irish House of Commons for Kilbeggan, a younger son of Charles Lambart, 1st Earl of Cavan. Oliver's great-grandson Charles Lambart (1746–1785) was member of the Irish Parliament for Kilbeggan, and grandfather of Gustavus William Lambart (1814–1886), State Steward to the Lord-Lieutenant of Ireland. He married Lady Frances Caroline Maria Conyngham, daughter of Francis Conyngham, 2nd Marquess Conyngham and Lady Jane Paget (daughter of Henry Paget, 1st Marquess of Anglesey) and father of the 1st Baronet. The house at Beau Park or Beauparc was built in 1755 for Gustavus Lambart (died 1782), father of Charles, to a design attributed to Nathaniel Clements; Charles Lambart made additions c.1778 in collaboration with Daniel Augustus Beaufort.

== See also ==
- Earl of Cavan

Baronetage of the United Kingdom
Preceded by Younger baronets	Lambart baronets of Beau Parc; 13 July 1911	Succeeded by Redwood baronets
