= Crusaid =

UK health charity

CRUSAID was a British charity that provided financial assistance during the AIDS epidemic to institutions and to people suffering from HIV/AIDS. In 1996, the charity had close to £11 million in assets.

Founded in Chelsea in 1986, CRUSAID was absorbed into the Terrence Higgins Trust in 2011.

CRUSAID supporters included the Princess Alexandra, the Duchess of York, Princess Margaret and Diana, Princess of Wales. CRUSAID managed many performance events in London like "Dance for Life" that included prominent actors, musicians, dancers and theatre producers. CRUSAID also started charitable walks and other events throughout the country for the general population.

== Description ==
From the outset, a major element of CRUSAID's financial giving centred around the Individual Hardship Fund. This Fund made individual grants to AIDS sufferers. Requests included being rehoused, buying a washing machine to help manage night sweats or diarrhoea, receiving a travel grant to assist with a hospice stay. The CRUSAID grants were tailored to the needs of the individual. Recommendations for patient requests were required from a social worker, doctor or nurse and grant requests were received from all over the country. In time the Individual Hardship Fund was consolidated with a similar fund operated by the Terrence Higgins Trust to be managed by CRUSAID. The Fund later received annual contributions from the Elton John AIDS Foundation and the Sainsbury Trust. Using their management of events, CRUSAID built a database of donors that reached 25,000 names by 1986. They used this large database to pioneer the use of direct mail solicitations for charity in the United Kingdom. The success of this approach was very much in evidence when CRUSAID launched a campaign to co-fund an HIV research centre. The appeal set up a regular donor base that CRUSAID used for many years.

== History ==
In December 1985, a group of friends, Entrepreneur Jeremy Norman, Geoffrey Henning and David MacFarlane were dining together.A topic of discussion was a recent fundraising event to buy a dishwasher for the HIV ward at St Stephen's Hospital in Chelsea. The purpose was to replace paper plates and plastic knives and forks with proper crockery and utensils. The staff were afraid of cross-contamination with HIV. The friends were also discussing the awakening community response in the United States to the epidemic. Later, in 1986, one of the attendees revealed that he had tested positive for HIV and challenged his friends to do something.

In June 1986, CRUSAID was launched by its first Chairman, Jeremy Norman, at a reception at Leighton House in London with over 200 people attending. In his speech, Jeremy Norman warned that the "gay plague" happening in America would soon come to our shores; in consequence a large percentage of those present would be dead within a few years. Many accused him of being alarmist however, sadly, events proved him correct.

In 1987 CRUSAID obtained a grant for three years of funding from The Monument Trust to employ a staff member and rent an office. In 1988, Etonian and Hotelier Major Michael Watson was appointed Chairman, a post he would hold for almost eight years. Soon after this, he appointed Henning as Director. The Board included prominent Gay men like the Jewish lawyer Andrew Stone partner of Lord Etherton. The initial CRUSAID mailing, with an invitation to the reception and announcing the launch, met with a very sympathetic response, and income in the first year exceeded £100,000. Freddie Kobler attended the launch and generously offered £500,000 if a suitable project could be found.

Discussions were initiated with several UK hospitals. The Kensington and Chelsea Hospital offered to initiate the first day-care centre in the United Kingdom for the treatment of HIV; CRUSAID funded it. Derek Frost offered his services as interior designer pro-bono. He invited the artists, Howard Hodgkin and Patrick Proctor to design the windows. The Kobler Center was opened by Diana, Princess of Wales.

In 1990, CRUSAID started its annual Walk for Life, with thousands of people walking through London. In 1991 walks were held in London, Birmingham, Manchester, Glasgow and Windsor, with proceeds going to local AIDS projects. Gilbert and George sold 25 paintings at the Anthony d’Offay Gallery and donated over £500,000 for HIV-related projects. Support from West End theatre producers led to the selling of tickets for sold-out shows to people happy to match the ticket price (paid to the theatre) with a donation to the charity. Watson retired as chair after eight years and was succeeded by Lord Eatwell. Henning retired as director in December 1996 and was followed by James Deutsch, who was in the post for about five years.

The CRUSAID board soon decided that the organisation could not handle the cost of organising more events. They decided to forgo them unless a sponsor could be found. However, this move did lower the public profile of CRUSAID. Some said that it also slowed public discussion of HIV/AIDS.

By 2007, advances in medicine meant fewer demands on the individual hardship fund, and research was being prioritised and commercialised. The role for niche fundraising was diminishing. In 2011, the CRUSAID board voted to merge the charity with the Terrence Higgins Trust.
