= Soho Gyms =

Former gym chain in London, England

- Company type: Private Company
- Industry: Health Clubs
- Founded: 1994
- Founder: Jeremy Norman
- Defunct: 2018
- Number of locations: 10 clubs
- Area served: London, United Kingdom
- Website: www.sohogyms.com

Soho Gyms was a British chain of gyms spread out across central London.

According to filings at Companies House, Soho Gyms’ holding company Ovalhouse made a pre-tax profit of £611,000 in 2014, on sales of £8.02m. In 2017 it was reported that profits were falling due, in part, to increased local competition.

== History ==
After visiting New York, entrepreneur Jeremy Norman was inspired to open his first gym, Power Station in Chelsea, in 1983. Following on from this and using his experience in the nightclub world Jeremy opened the Soho Athletic Club in Covent Garden in 1994. Together with fellow founding directors Derek Frost and Richard Taylor, Jeremy rebranded to Soho Gyms and then expanded to include Earl's Court, Camden and Clapham. The Managing Director, Michael Crockett joined the business in January 2003, the group has now grown to 10 gyms including Waterloo, Borough, Bow Wharf, Lewisham, Farringdon and Tower Hill.

Soho Gyms was acquired by Pure Gym Ltd. in June 2018 and the brand ceased to exist on 16 November 2018.

== Soho Academy ==
The Soho Academy was established in 2009, and was created as a means to set a new standard in fitness training.

== Charity ==
Soho Gyms designated AIDS Ark as their official charity. The AIDS Ark Founder Trustees were directors of Soho Gyms, Jeremy Norman and Derek Frost, while Soho Gym staff and members raised money through a variety of campaigns.

They also made annual contributions to provide treatment and medical support for individuals with HIV/AIDs.
