= Richard Lambert (disambiguation) =

Sir Richard Lambert (born 1944) is the former Director-General of the Confederation of British Industry.

Richard Lambert may also refer to:

- Richard Cornthwaite Lambert (1868–1939), British Liberal MP
- Richard S. Lambert (1894–1981), British writer and broadcaster
- Richard Lambert (handballer) (born 1948), Canadian handball player
- Rickie Lambert (born 1982), English footballer

== See also ==
- Richard Lambart (disambiguation)
