= Michael Lambart, 12th Earl of Cavan =

British peer (1911-1988)

The Right Honourable The Earl of Cavan TD DL
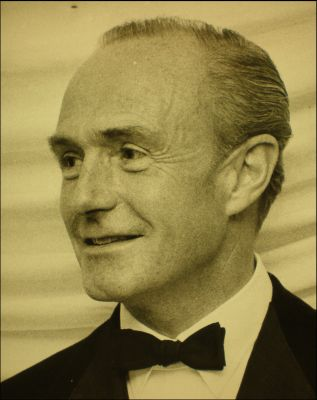
- Michael Lambart, 12th Earl of Cavan

Earl of Cavan
- In office 1950–1988
- Preceded by: Horace Lambart
- Succeeded by: Roger Lambart

Personal details
- Born: 29 October 1911
- Died: 17 November 1988 (aged 77)
- Spouse: Essex Lucy Cholmondeley (m. 1947)
- Parent: Horace Lambart, 11th Earl of Cavan
- Military career
- Allegiance: United Kingdom
- Branch: British Army
- Service years: 1955–1958
- Unit: Shropshire Yeomanry

Michael Edward Oliver Lambart, 12th Earl of Cavan, TD, DL (29 October 1911 – 17 November 1988) was a hereditary peer. He succeeded his father in 1950.

Lord Cavan was educated at Radley College, a public school for boys in Oxfordshire.

He was commanding officer of the Shropshire Yeomanry between 1955 and 1958.

He married Essex Lucy Cholmondeley, daughter of Henry Arthur Cholmondeley and Helen Mary Wrigley, on 10 April 1947.

As he had no sons, the title passed from him to a distant cousin, Roger Cavan Lambart, a descendant of the 7th Earl.

Peerage of Ireland
Preceded by Horace Lambart	Earl of Cavan; 1950–1988	Succeeded by Roger Lambart
