= Jeremy Norman =

British Journalist & Author (born 1947)

Jeremy Gordon Norman
- Born: May 18, 1947 (age 79); London, United Kingdom
- Occupations: Entrepreneur, author, television presenter, and journalist
- Known for: Managing Burke's Peerage and the gay 'ultradisco' Heaven nightclub
- Spouse: Derek Frost (m. 2006)

Jeremy Norman (born 18 May 1947) is a British entrepreneur, whose ventures have included Burke's Peerage, Mayfair's Embassy nightclub, the gay 'ultradisco' Heaven, the clubs Embargo and Leopard Lounge on Fulham Broadway, the Power Station gym in Chelsea, in partnership with Richard Branson, and Soho Gyms. He is also an author, television presenter, and journalist, and has had many charitable commitments.

== Early life and education ==
Jeremy Gordon Norman was born in Marylebone, Greater London, in 1947. His parents were Wing Commander Roland Frank Holdway Norman and Muriel Johnson, known as Peggy, daughter of Percy Johnson. They were living together in Marylebone in 1939 and were married in 1944. His father died in 1958, aged 62.

Norman was educated at Harrow School and Pembroke College, Cambridge, where he read archaeology and anthropology. He graduated BA in 1972 and MA by seniority in 1975. After Cambridge, he became a self-employed entrepreneur.

== Career ==
In 1974 Norman went into the wine business with his brother, under the name of La Reserve. The same year, he became Chairman of Burke's Peerage, a publisher of genealogical reference works, of which his old school friend Hugh Montgomery-Massingberd was editor at the time. He continued in this role until 1983, his fellow directors including Patrick, Lord Lichfield, and John Brooke-Little, Richmond Herald of Arms. Under his chairmanship new volumes were published on royal families, Irish genealogy, and country houses of the British Isles. Norman’s stake in the business continued for ten years. In 1984, the Burke's Peerage titles were separated and sold: Burke’s Peerage itself was acquired by Frederik Jan Gustav Floris, Baron van Pallandt (1934–94), while Burke's Landed Gentry and other titles were sold to other buyers.

Norman's first nightclub, established in 1978, was the Embassy Club in Old Bond Street, which has been called "London's first modern New York-style nightclub". Other directors were the fashion designer Michael Fish and Derek Johns, a picture dealer and director of Sotheby's. Norman sold the Embassy to Lady Edith Foxwell. In 1979, he created an entirely new form of club, the ultradisco Heaven, near Charing Cross, which "quickly established itself as the centre of London gay nightlife" and became Europe's largest and "the world's most famous gay nightclub". Norman's partner, Derek Frost, designed the "original hi-tech interior". Heaven introduced a new music style, Hi-NRG. After four years, Norman sold the club to Richard Branson of Virgin.

In 1983 Norman and Richard Branson became partners in Norman's first gym, Power Station in Chelsea (1983–1989). In 1994 he was founding Chairman of Ovalhouse Ltd., trading as Soho Gyms, a chain of ten gyms mainly in central London, a company sold to Pure Gym in 2018. He also owns two property investment companies, Blakenhall & Co. Ltd. and Citychance Ltd.

Norman originated two other successful clubs: Embargo (1990–94), and Leopard Lounge on Fulham Broadway (1989–92). His other businesses included Pasta Pasta, a manufacturer and retailer of fresh pasta and sauces, with Derek Johns launched in 1984.

== Writer and television presenter ==
In 2006, Norman described many encounters and experiences from his life in his autobiography No Make-up: Straight Tales from a Queer Life (2006). Matthew Parris wrote about this in The Times, calling it "A marvellous book. Startlingly candid, unblushingly funny about wealth, privilege. and the pursuit of fun. Mr. Norman … paints an unforgettable picture of gay life in an age of official prohibition."

Norman has also written books about his adventures with Derek Frost aboard a private yacht, from their perspective as "Two Men in a Boat". The first, Two Men in a Boat: Chasing Spring, was inspired by a quotation, "Spring travels up through Britain at the pace of a walking man." This struck Norman as a romantic notion, and he and Frost set out to test the theory, which led them on a journey, chasing the arrival of spring up the west coast of Great Britain. The follow-up, Two Men in a Boat: Illyrian Shores, is a "story of a romantic voyage in the wake of the Venetians... from Cofu to Venice."

Norman's "Two Men in a Boat" books developed into a 25-part Out TV television series, under the same title, which documented their odysseys and is narrated by the two men and their expert guests speaking about the history, archaeology, art, natural history, and landscape of the many places they visit.

Norman entered the field of journalism with pieces in The Sunday Times, The Spectator and The Times of Malta. His articles are about food, politics, gay life, and his wide travels with Frost.

== Voluntary work ==
Norman's pro bono and charity appointments have focused on HIV/AIDS. He was the founding chairman of Crusaid in 1985, Trustee of the National AIDS Trust in 1986, a founding Trustee of Aids Ark, and a Trustee of the University Pitt Club, Cambridge, from 1994 to 2009.

Appointments:

- Hon. Treasurer and Trustee University Pitt Club, Cambridge 1989–2009
- Founder chairman Crusaid (national fundraising charity for AIDS)
- Trustee National AIDS Trust
- Founder Trustee of Aids Ark 2002–2017

== Personal life ==
Norman has been in a relationship with Derek Frost since 1978. They became civil partners on 21 December 2005, the first day the law of the United Kingdom made this possible. They currently reside in Malta.

== Books and publications ==
- No Make-Up, Straight Tales from a Queer Life, Elliott & Thompson Limited (6 Oct 2006) ISBN 978-1904027508
- Two Men in a Boat – Chasing Spring
- Two men in a Boat – Illyrian Shores

== Films and Documentaries ==
- Two Men in a Boat – Chasing Spring
- Two men in a Boat – Illyrian Shores
