= Saint-Romans =

- Commune
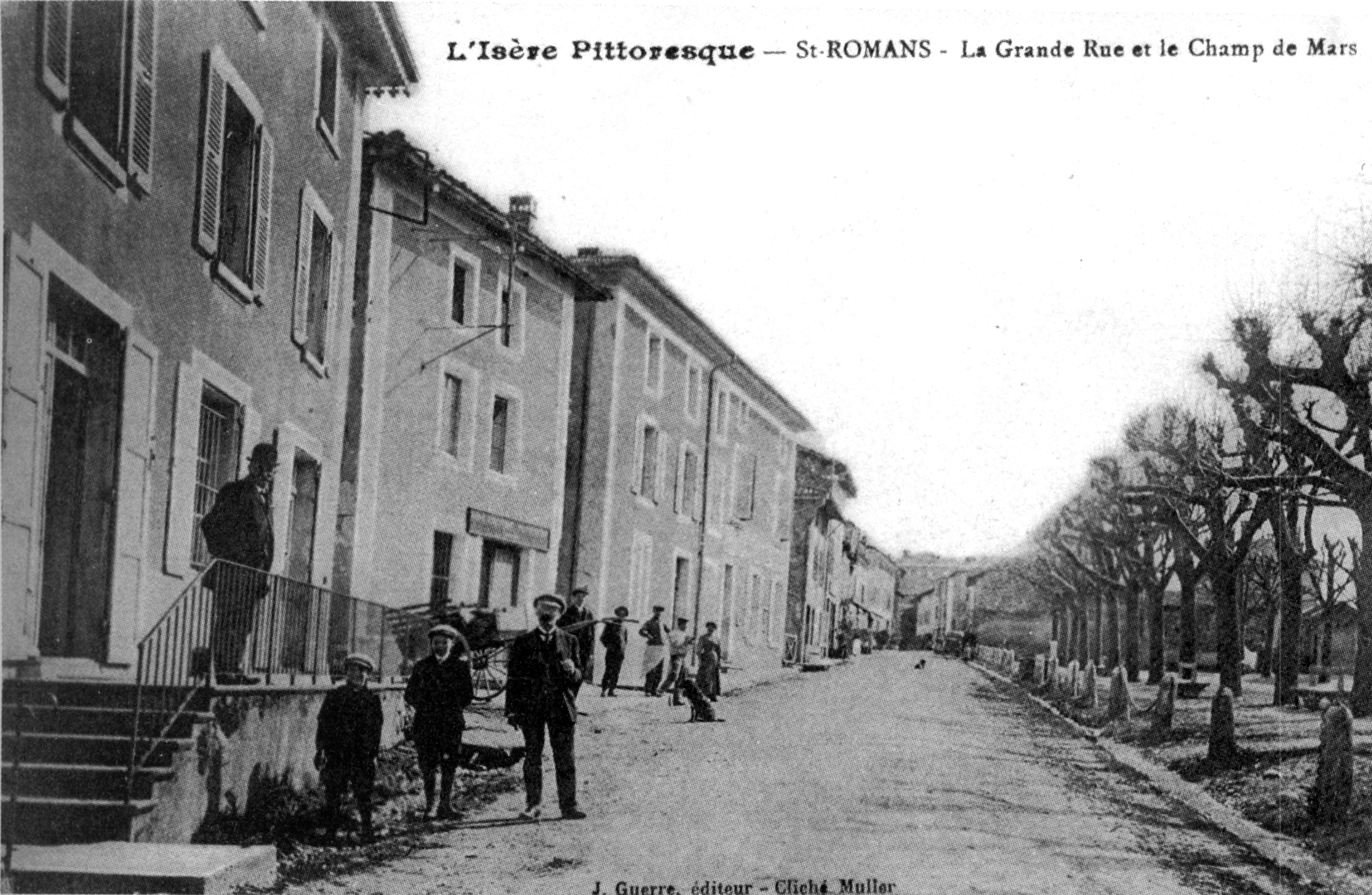
- Saint-Romans in 1910

- Coat of arms
- Location of Saint-Romans
- Location within France Location within Auvergne-Rhône-Alpes
- Coordinates: 45°07′00″N 5°19′39″E
- Country: France
- Region: Auvergne-Rhône-Alpes
- Department: Isère
- Arrondissement: Grenoble
- Canton: Le Sud Grésivaudan

Government
  - Mayor (2020–2026): Yvan Créach
- Area^{1}: 17.04 km^{2} (6.58 sq mi)
- Elevation: 218 m (715 ft)
- Highest elevation: 863 m (2,831 ft)
- Lowest elevation: 160 m (520 ft)
- Population (2023): 1,897
  - Density: 111.3/km^{2} (288.3/sq mi)
- Time zone: UTC+01:00 (CET)
  - Summer (DST): UTC+02:00 (CEST)
- INSEE/Postal code: 38453 /38160
- ^{1} French Land Register data, which excludes lakes, ponds, glaciers > 1 km^{2} (0.386 sq mi or 247 acres) and river estuaries.

Saint-Romans (French pronunciation: [sɛ̃ ʁɔmɑ̃]) is a commune in the Isère department in southeastern France.

== Population ==
Historical population
Year	Pop.	±% p.a.
1968	1,001	—
1975	1,129	+1.73%
1982	1,306	+2.10%
1990	1,367	+0.57%
1999	1,410	+0.34%
2007	1,686	+2.26%
2012	1,745	+0.69%
2017	1,778	+0.38%
2023	1,897	+1.09%
Source: INSEE

== Twin towns ==
Saint-Romans is twinned with:

- Roccasecca dei Volsci, Italy, since 2003

== See also ==
- Communes of the Isère department
- Parc naturel régional du Vercors
