= Ford Lambart, 5th Earl of Cavan =

Irish peer

Ford Lambart, 5th Earl of Cavan (1718–1772) was an Irish peer and freemason.

He was born in 1718 in Maryborough, son of the 4th Earl and Margaret Trant. Lambart was elected Grand Master of the Grand Lodge of Ireland in 1767, a post he held for the next two years.

He had no son, and at his death, his titles passed to a cousin, Richard Lambart, a grandson of the 3rd Earl.

Masonic offices
| Preceded by The Earl of Westmeath | Grandmaster of the Grand Lodge of Ireland; 1767–1769 | Succeeded by The Earl of Kingston |
Peerage of Ireland
| Preceded by Richard Lambart | Earl of Cavan; 1742–1772 | Succeeded by Richard Lambart |
