= Earl of Cavan =

Title in the Peerage of Ireland

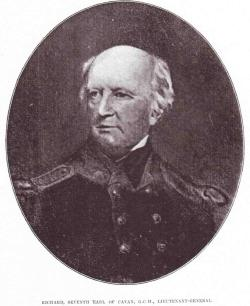
General The 7th Earl of Cavan

Earl of Cavan is a title in the Peerage of Ireland. It was created in 1647 for Charles Lambart, 2nd Baron Lambart. He was made Viscount Kilcoursie, in the King's County, at the same time, also in the Peerage of Ireland. Lord Cavan was the son of Oliver Lambart, who had been elevated to the Peerage of Ireland as Lord Lambart, Baron of Cavan in the County of Cavan, in 1618.

The 2nd Earl of Cavan was insane for much of his adult life. The 7th Earl of Cavan was a general during the Napoleonic Wars, he was succeeded by his grandson the 8th Earl. The 10th Earl was an army commander during the First World War and later a British Field Marshal and Chief of the Imperial General Staff. As he died without male issue, he was succeeded by his youngest brother the 11th Earl. When the 12th Earl died, the title presumably passed to Roger Cavan Lambart, a descendant of the 7th Earl.

As of 18 June 2024, Roger Cavan Lambart has not yet established his right to the peerage.

== Barons Lambart (1618) ==
- Oliver Lambart, 1st Baron Lambart (died 1618)
- Charles Lambart, 2nd Baron Lambart (created Earl of Cavan and Viscount Kilcoursie in 1647)

== Earls of Cavan (1647) ==
- Charles Lambart, 1st Earl of Cavan, 1st Viscount Kilcoursie, 2nd Baron Lambart (1600–1660)
- Richard Lambart, 2nd Earl of Cavan, 2nd Viscount Kilcoursie, 3rd Baron Lambart (died 1690)
- Charles Lambart, 3rd Earl of Cavan, 3rd Viscount Kilcoursie, 4th Baron Lambart (1649–1702)
  - Charles Lambart, Lord Lambart (died c. 1689)
- Richard Lambart, 4th Earl of Cavan, 4th Viscount Kilcoursie, 5th Baron Lambart (died 1742)
  - Gilbert Lambart, Lord Lambart (died before 1742)
- Ford Lambart, 5th Earl of Cavan, 5th Viscount Kilcoursie, 6th Baron Lambart (1718–1772)
- Richard Lambart, 6th Earl of Cavan, 6th Viscount Kilcoursie, 7th Baron Lambart (died 1778)
- Richard Ford William Lambart, 7th Earl of Cavan, 7th Viscount Kilcoursie, 8th Baron Lambart (1763–1837)
  - Richard Henry Robert Gilbert Lambart, Viscount Kilcoursie (1783–1785)
  - Richard Henry Lambart, Viscount Kilcoursie (1788–1788)
  - George Frederick Augustus Lambart, Viscount Kilcoursie (1789–1828)
- Frederick John William Lambart, 8th Earl of Cavan, 8th Viscount Kilcoursie, 9th Baron Lambart (1815–1887)
- Frederick Edward Gould Lambart, 9th Earl of Cavan, 9th Viscount Kilcoursie, 10th Baron Lambart (1839–1900)
- Frederick Rudolph Lambart, 10th Earl of Cavan, 10th Viscount Kilcoursie, 11th Baron Lambart (1865–1946) (Irish representative peer from 1915)
- Horace Edward Samuel Lambart, 11th Earl of Cavan, 11th Viscount Kilcoursie, 12th Baron Lambart (1878–1950)
- Michael Edward Oliver Lambart, 12th Earl of Cavan, 12th Viscount Kilcoursie, 13th Baron Lambart (1911–1988)

== Present peer (presumed) ==
- Roger Cavan Lambart, presumed 13th Earl of Cavan, 13th Viscount Kilcoursie, 14th Baron Lambart (born 1944)

The heir presumptive is Cavan C.E. Lambart (born 1957, see below line of succession), an eighth cousin once removed.

Line of succession, simplified)
- Charles Lambart, 1st Earl of Cavan (1600–1660)
  - Richard Lambart, 2nd Earl of Cavan (1628–1690)
    - Charles Lambart, 3rd Earl of Cavan (1649–1702)
      - Hon. Henry Lambart
        - Richard Lambart, 6th Earl of Cavan (d. 1778)
          - Richard Lambart, 7th Earl of Cavan (1763–1837)
            - Hon. Oliver William Matthew Lambart (1822–1863)
              - Frederick Richard Henry Lambart (1850–1888)
                - Charles Edward Kilcoursie Lambart (1877–1916)
                  - Frederick Cavan Lambart (1902–1963)
                    - Roger Lambart, 13th Earl of Cavan (born 1944)
  - Hon. Oliver Lambart (d. 1700)
    - Charles Lambart (d. 1753)
      - Gustavus Lambart
        - Charles Lambart
          - Gustavus Lambart (1772–1850)
            - Gustavus William (1814–1886)
              - Sir Gustavus Francis William Lambart, 1st Baronet (1848–1926)
                - Lambart baronets
              - Cyril Henry Edward Lambart (born 1866)
                - Terence Edward William Lambart (1903–1965)
                  - (1). Cavan Cyril Ernest Lambart (born 1957)
                    - (2). Julian Stuart Lambart (born 1993)

There are further heirs in line descended from Cyril Lambart.

== See also ==
- Lambart baronets
