= Richard Lambart, 6th Earl of Cavan =

Anglo-Irish peer and British general

Lieutenant-General Richard Lambart, 6th Earl of Cavan (died 2 November 1778) was an Anglo-Irish peer and soldier.

He was the son of Henry and Dorothea Lambart and succeeded his cousin Ford Lambart, 5th Earl of Cavan, to the earldom in 1772. His father was a younger son of the 3rd Earl of Cavan.

He joined the Army and became a Major-General in 1772 and a Lieutenant-General in 1777. He was appointed Colonel of the 55th Foot on 3 August 1774, transferring as Colonel to the 15th Foot on 7 September 1775, an appointment he held until his death.

He was elected to the Parliament of Ireland in 1773.

He died in 1778 and was buried in St. Patrick's Cathedral, Dublin. He married twice: firstly his cousin Sophia, daughter of Oliver Lambart (a younger son of Charles Lambart, 3rd Earl of Cavan); and secondly Elizabeth, the daughter and coheiress of William Davies (Commissioner of the Navy), with whom he had a son and a daughter. Furthermore, he was succeeded by his son Richard Lambart, 7th Earl of Cavan.

== Published Works ==
In 1776 Lambert published A New System of Military Discipline, Founded Upon Principle.

Military offices
Preceded by William Gansell	Colonel of the 55th Regiment of Foot; 1774–1775	Succeeded by Robert Pigot
Preceded by Sir Charles Hotham, Bt	Colonel of the 15th Regiment of Foot; 1775–1778	Succeeded by Sir William Fawcett
Peerage of Ireland
Preceded by Ford Lambart	Earl of Cavan; 1772–1778	Succeeded by Richard Lambart
