= Charles Lambart, 3rd Earl of Cavan =

Irish peer

Charles Lambart, 3rd Earl of Cavan (7 September 1649 – 5 December 1702) was an Irish peer.

He was the eldest son of Richard Lambart, 2nd Earl of Cavan and Rose Ware, daughter of the historian Sir James Ware and Elizabeth Newman. He inherited the Earldom of Cavan in 1690 from his father, who had long been insane. His mother apparently died giving birth to him.

He married Castilina, daughter of Henry Gilbert of Kilminchy, County Laois and Gertrude St Leger and sister of St Leger Gilbert, MP for Maryborough, and had four sons, including Charles, Lord Lambart, who predeceased him, Richard Lambart, 4th Earl of Cavan, Oliver, who married Frances Stewart, and Henry, father of the 6th Earl. He died in December 1702 and was buried in St. Patrick's Cathedral, Dublin. Castilina died at a great age in 1742.

Peerage of Ireland
Preceded by Richard Lambart	Earl of Cavan; 1690–1702	Succeeded by Richard Lambart
