= Frederick Lambart, 8th Earl of Cavan =

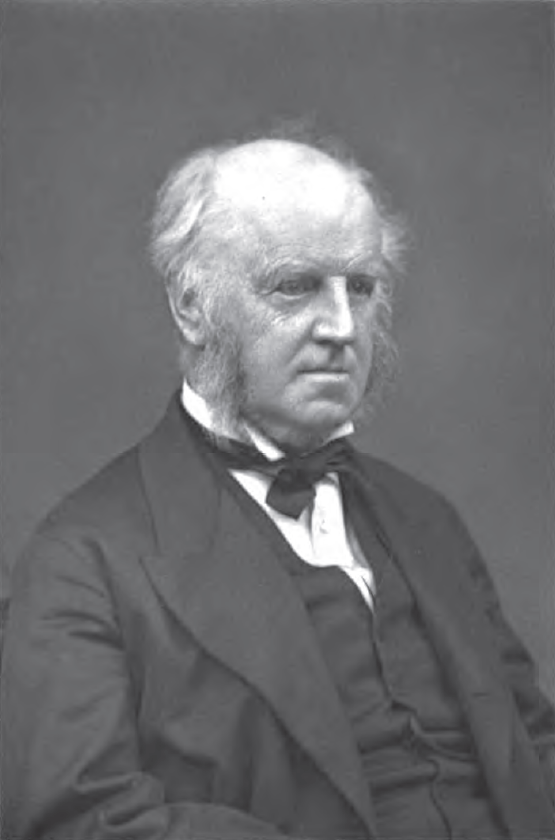
Frederick Lambart, 8th Earl of Cavan

Frederick John William Lambart, 8th Earl of the County of Cavan (30 December 1815 – 16 December 1887) was a British aristocrat. He was the son of George Frederick Augustus Lambart, Viscount Kilcoursie and Sarah Coppin.

His father, while with the Coldstream Guards, was severely wounded during the Peninsular War in the battle of Talavera and remained lame for the rest of his life until his death in 1828 at the age of 39. Frederick was left an orphan. He was sent to Eton from 1829 until 1833, where he was known, without his title, simply as Lambart. The Rev. Dr Hawtrey was the then-headmaster and gave encouraging influence, which helped him succeed in his education.

He was born on 30 December 1815 at his parents' home of Ower Cottage, Fawley, Hampshire, England.

== Career ==
At age 17, he was placed in the 7th Dragoon Guards, joining the regiment in Cork under Colonel Clarke. In 1835, his quarters were changed from Carlow to Dublin. In the autumn of 1836, he was posted to Walsall, Staffordshire.

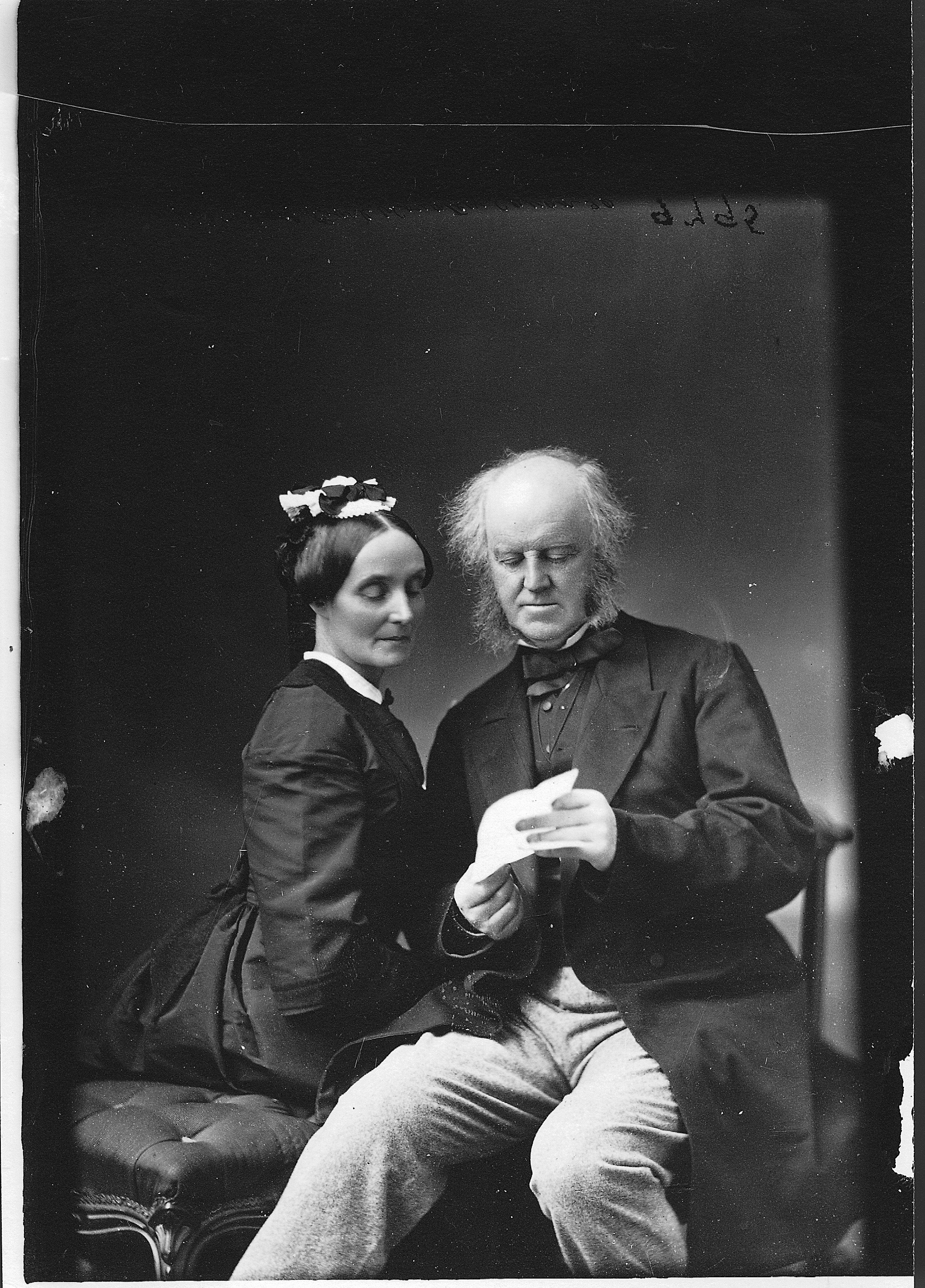
Picture taken of Frederick Lambart and wife by William Notman in his studio in Montreal in 1874.

== Marriage ==
He married Caroline Augusta Littleton, daughter of Edward John Littleton, 1st Baron Hatherton, and Hyacinthe Mary Wellesley, on 24 July 1838 at St George's Church, Hanover Square, London. It was about this time, after the death of his grandfather, that he succeeded to the title and impaired estates. They remained married for 49 years and 5 months, and had five children:

- Lady Mary Hyacinthe Lambart (died 22 August 1933)
- Lady Sarah Sophia Lambart (died 8 July 1914)
- Sir Frederick Edward Gould Lambart, 9th Earl of the County of Cavan (21 October 1839 – 14 July 1900)
- Hon. Octavus Henry Lambart (10 January 1855 – 24 January 1919), married in 1878 Hannah Sarah Howard, daughter of Hiram Edward Howard, of Buffalo, New York
- Major Hon. Arthur Lambart (11 August 1858 – 3 April 1937)

== Religious faith ==
After 1839 they went to Frankfurt am Main, then Bad Ems, followed by two years in Munich. It was here that his deeper biblical studies began. Upon securing a Bible in Dublin in 1835, religion began to play a part in his life. After 1844 he was, until his death, a member of the Open Plymouth Brethren. In 1846 Cavan went to Torquay and played a part in the formation of the Evangelical Alliance with Sir Culling Eardley. Among his special interests was biblical prophecy. He often preached on Christ's expected second advent.

In 1866, Lord Cavan invited Granville Waldegrave, 3rd Baron Radstock to come to Weston-super-Mare for evangelistic meetings. Dr Friedrich Wilhelm Baedeker, cousin of Karl Baedeker, the famous travel guides editor, attended one of these meetings and experienced a religious conversion.

== Death ==
He died on 16 December 1887, aged 71, at Ashcombe Lodge, Weston-super-Mare, Somerset, England. His last words were, 'We need no more doctors; the Lord standeth at the door!' He was buried on 22 December 1887, when 500 attended the funeral. Thomas Newberry preached at the grave-side. His will, dated 19 February 1887, was probated at over £10,000.

Peerage of Ireland
Preceded by Richard Lambart	Earl of Cavan; 1837–1887	Succeeded by Frederick Lambart
