= Richard Lambart, 2nd Earl of Cavan =

Irish politician

Richard Lambart, 2nd Earl of the County of Cavan (1628–1690) was Member of Parliament for Kilbeggan between 1647 and 1649.

The title Earl of Cavan was created in the Peerage of Ireland in 1647 for Charles Lambart, 2nd Baron Lambart. Richard was his eldest son by Jane Robartes, daughter of Richard, 1st Baron Robartes and Frances Hender, and sister of John Robartes, 1st Earl of Radnor.

He married Rose Ware, daughter of Sir James Ware and Elizabeth Newman and had issue Charles Lambart, 3rd Earl of Cavan. Rose apparently died in childbirth.

In 1670 Lambart was declared insane, having suffered from a "deep melancholy" for many years. This was attributed by his acquaintances to brooding on the wrongs done to him by his brother Oliver, who had persuaded their father to give him much of Richard's inheritance.

Peerage of Ireland
Preceded by Charles Lambart	Earl of Cavan; 1660–1690	Succeeded by Charles Lambart
