= Oliver Lambart, 1st Baron Lambart =

Oliver Lambart, 1st Lord Lambart, Baron of Cavan (died June 1618) was a military commander and an MP in the Irish House of Commons. He was Governor of Connaught in 1601. He was invested as a Privy Counsellor (Ireland) in 1603. He was also an English MP, for Southampton 1597. He is buried in Westminster Abbey.

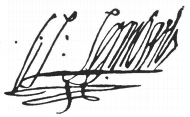
Signature of Oliver Lambart

== Biography ==
=== Military ===
Fighting the Spanish, Lambart took part in the Dutch campaign under his commander Francis Vere: he was wounded in the assault on Steenwijk which led to its capture in 1592. On 20 June 1596, Essex and Effingham sacked the harbour of Cádiz. The Spanish scuttled their Indies fleet including a cargo of 12 million ducats. The force occupied the city until 5 July. Lambart was knighted for his part in the looting.

During the Nine Years' War (1594–1603) Lambart served in Essex's Irish campaign of 1599. He commanded the 200 Foot at Enniscorthy, County Wexford.

On 6 January 1615, he retook Dunyvaig Castle, Islay, with the assistance of Sir John Campbell of Calder.

=== Politics ===
He was in 1613 elected one of two MPs for County Cavan, sitting from 1613 to 1615. He was created 1st Lord Lambart, Baron of Cavan, County Cavan shortly before his death.

=== Family ===
His son was Charles Lambart, 1st Earl of Cavan.

Peerage of Ireland
New creation	Baron Lambart; 1618	Succeeded by Charles Lambart
