= Charles Lambart, 1st Earl of Cavan =

Anglo-Irish Royalist soldier and peer

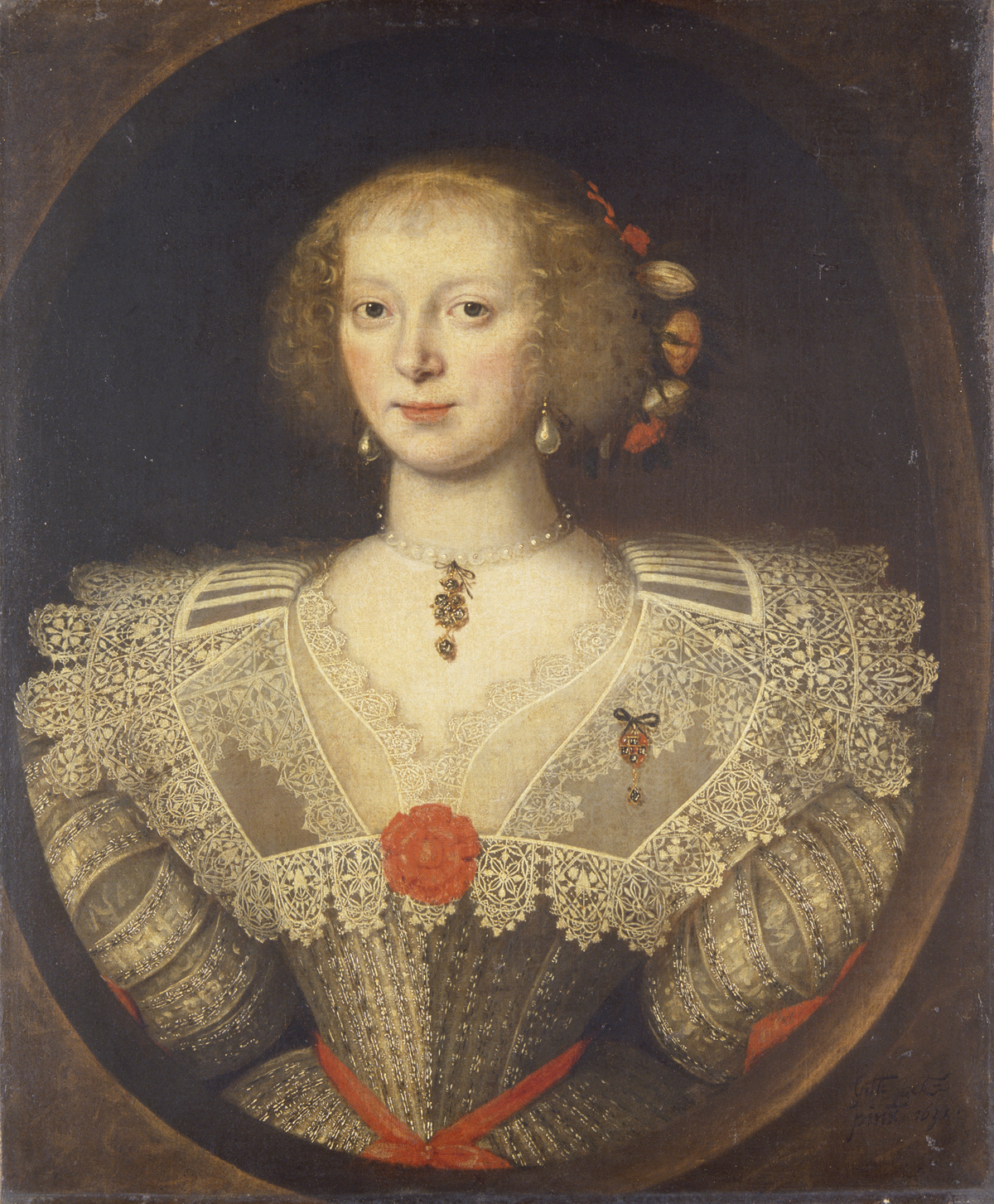
Charles Lambart married Jane Robartes (pictured), with whom he had three children.

Charles Lambart, 1st Earl of Cavan (c. March 1600 – 25 June 1660) was an Anglo-Irish Royalist soldier and peer.

Lambart was the son of Oliver Lambart, 1st Baron Lambart and Hester Fleetwood. He served as the Member of Parliament for Bossiney in Cornwall in 1626, and again between 1628 and 1629. He had succeeded to his father's barony on 10 June 1618 but as this was a title in the Peerage of Ireland, he was not secluded from sitting in the House of Commons of England. Lambart was Seneschal of Cavan and of Kells in 1627 and made a member of the Privy Council of Ireland.

Following the Irish Rebellion of 1641, he raised a regiment of 1,000 foot guards against the Roman Catholic rebels. He was subsequently the commander of the forces guarding Dublin on behalf of Charles I in 1642. On 15 April 1647, Lambart was created Earl of Cavan and Viscount Kilcoursie in the Peerage of Ireland, in recognition of his loyalty to the Royalist cause.

== Family ==
Lambart married Hon. Jane Robartes, the daughter of Richard Robartes, 1st Baron Robartes and his wife Frances Hender, and sister of John Robartes, 1st Earl of Radnor, in 1625. Together they had four children, Richard, Oliver, Rose and Hester. He was succeeded in his titles by his eldest son, Richard, who was insane for most of his adult life. Some blamed his father indirectly for Richard's mental condition, in favouring his younger son Oliver to the extent that he deprived Richard of much of his inheritance, causing him to fall into a "deep melancholy".

Parliament of England
Preceded by Sir Francis Cottington; Jonathan Prideaux	Member of Parliament for Bossiney; 1626–1629; With: Paul Speccot 1626; Richard Edgcumbe 1628–1629	Parliament suspended until 1640
Peerage of Ireland
New creation	Earl of Cavan; 1647–1660	Succeeded by Richard Lambart
Preceded by Oliver Lambart	Baron Lambart; 1618–1660	Succeeded by Richard Lambart
