= Rudolph Lambart, 10th Earl of Cavan =

British Field Marshal (1865–1946)

Field Marshal The Right Honourable The Earl of Cavan KP GCB GCMG GCVO GBE DL
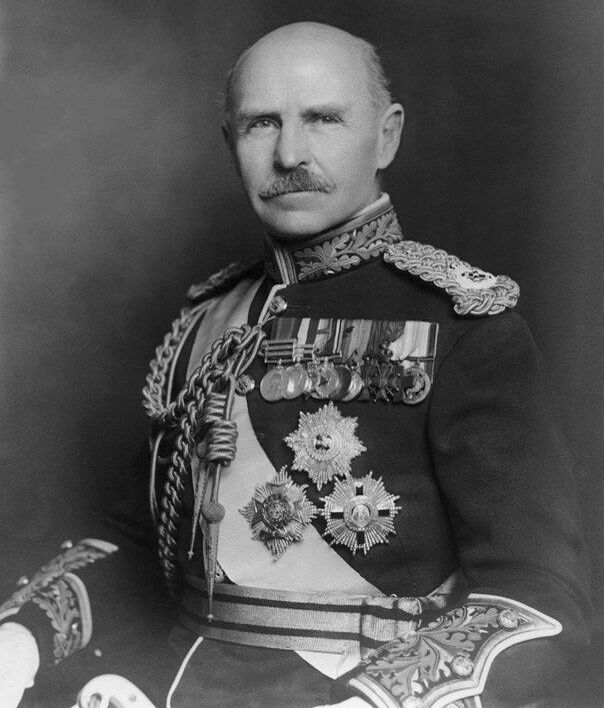
- Born: 16 October 1865; Ayot St Lawrence, Hertfordshire, England
- Died: 28 August 1946 (aged 80); London, England
- Spouses: Caroline Inez Crawley (m. 1893; died 1920) Lady Hester Joan Byng (m. 1922)
- Military career
- Allegiance: United Kingdom
- Branch: British Army
- Service years: 1885–1913; 1914–1926
- Rank: Field Marshal
- Nickname: "Fatty" (Note: "This came about not because Rudolph was particularly fat, but because of his small stature... After joining the Grenadiers, Rudolph was given a uniform that was massively too large and baggy, and in it Rudolph appeared as an exaggerated corpulent figure – hence 'Fatty'.")
- Unit: Grenadier Guards
- Commands: Chief of the Imperial General Staff; Aldershot Command; XIV Corps; Guards Division; 50th (Northumbrian) Division; 4th (Guards) Brigade; 2nd London Brigade; 2nd Battalion, Grenadier Guards
- Conflicts: Second Boer War; First World War: Italian Front
- Awards: Knight of the Order of St Patrick; Knight Grand Cross of the Order of the Bath; Knight Grand Cross of the Order of St Michael and St George; Knight Grand Cross of the Royal Victorian Order; Knight Grand Cross of the Order of the British Empire; Mentioned in Despatches; Commander of the Legion of Honour (France); Grand Officer of the Order of the Crown (Belgium); Grand Officer of the Order of Saints Maurice and Lazarus (Italy); Grand Officer of the Military Order of Savoy (Italy); War Cross for Military Valor (Italy); Army Distinguished Service Medal (United States); Order of Wen-Hu (China)

Field Marshal Frederick Rudolph Lambart, 10th Earl of Cavan (16 October 1865 – 28 August 1946), known as Viscount Kilcoursie from 1887 until 1900, was a British Army officer who served as chief of the imperial general staff (CIGS), the professional head of the British Army, in the 1920s. After being commissioned into the Grenadier Guards in 1885, he served in the Second Boer War as a company commander, then served with distinction during the First World War as a brigade, divisional, corps, and army commander, and later advised the British government on the implementation of the Geddes report, which advocated a large reduction in defence expenditure; he presided over a major reduction in the size of the British Army.

== Early life and military career ==
Born into an aristocratic family of Anglo-Irish descent, he was the son of the 9th Earl of Cavan and Mary Sneade Lambart (née Olive). He was educated at Eton College, Christ Church, Oxford, and the Royal Military College, Sandhurst; As there were no vacancies at that time for his preferred regiment, the Coldstream Guards, so he was instead commissioned as a lieutenant into the Grenadier Guards on 29 August 1885. He gained the courtesy title of Viscount Kilcoursie in 1887 when his father succeeded to the Earldom and was appointed aide-de-camp to Frederick Stanley, the Governor General of Canada, in 1891.

He was promoted to captain on 16 October 1897, after he had been appointed regimental adjutant on 25 August 1897, a position he held until 17 March 1900. By then, the Grenadier Guards were involved in the Second Boer War in South Africa. He saw action as a company commander in the Battle of Biddulphsberg in May 1900, and, having succeeded to his father's titles on 14 July 1900, took part in operations against the Boers in 1901 and for which he was later mentioned in despatches. Following the end of the war in June 1902, which prompted him to write in his diary that it was "not far removed from the happiest day of my life", he left Cape Town on the SS Sicilia and returned to Southampton in late July.

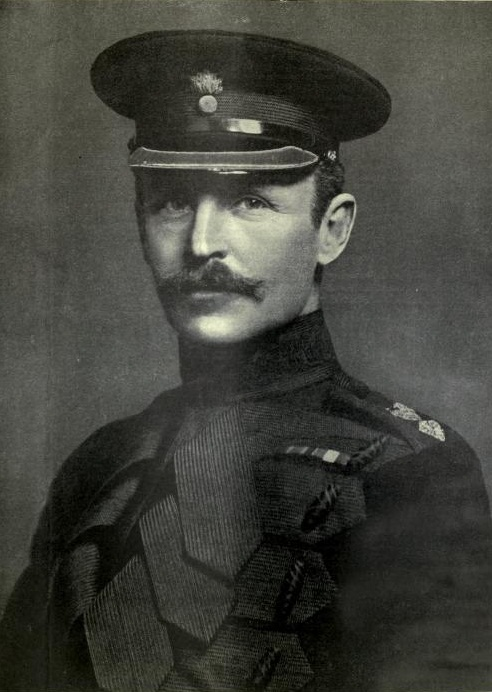
Cavan in the uniform of a lieutenant-colonel of the Grenadier Guards

After promotion to major on 28 October 1902, he became commandant of the School of Instruction for Officers of the Auxiliary Forces, Chelsea, in early 1903. He was appointed second-in-command of the 2nd Battalion, Grenadier Guards in July 1905. He was promoted again to lieutenant colonel and appointed commanding officer (CO) of the 1st Battalion, Grenadier Guards on 14 February 1908, taking over from Brevet Colonel Robert Scott-Kerr.

He was appointed a Member of the Royal Victorian Order Fourth Class on 29 June 1910, which was awarded personally to him by George V. He was promoted to colonel on 4 October 1911, After four years as CO of his battalion, he was placed on the half-pay list. By now having "come to the conclusion that his military career had run its course", he retired from the army on 8 November 1913 and became Master of Foxhounds for the Hertfordshire Hunt. At that time he lived at Wheathampstead House in Wheathampstead in his native Hertfordshire.

== First World War ==
=== Belgium and France ===
He was recalled at the start of the First World War and, after receiving a promotion to the temporary rank of brigadier general on 22 August, took command of the 2nd London Brigade of the 1st London Division, a Territorial Force (TF) unit then stationed in the East End of London.

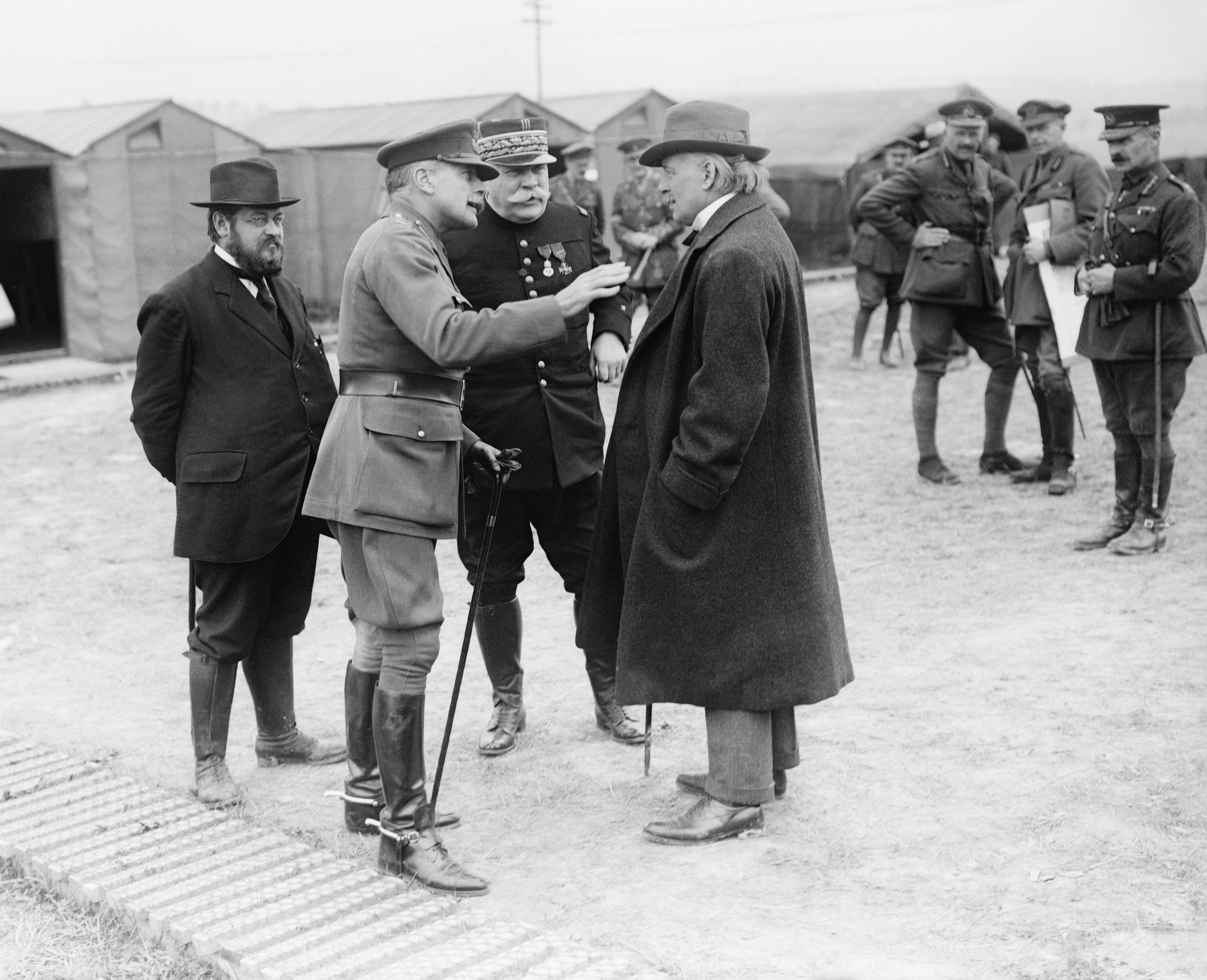
General Haig (second left) in discussion with David Lloyd George in September 1916. Cavan is stood on the extreme right.

His stay with the brigade was destined to be short as he was appointed CO of the 4th (Guards) Brigade on 18 September after its commander, Brigadier General Robert Scott-Kerr, his predecessor as CO of the 1st Grenadiers several years earlier, was badly wounded. Cavan, by now in France, went on to lead the brigade, which then formed part of the 2nd Division, at the First Battle of Ypres in October. Included as one of the four battalions under his brigade's command was the 1st Battalion of the Hertfordshire Regiment, in which many of his old neighbours were serving. Appointed a Companion of the Order of the Bath on 18 February 1915, he also led the brigade at the Battle of Festubert in May 1915.

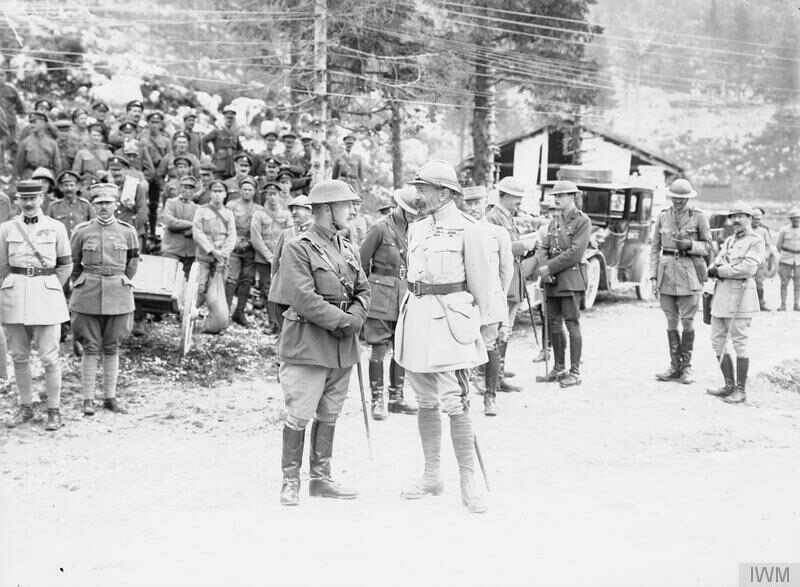
Lieutenant-General Rudolph Lambart (10th Earl of Cavan), the C-in-C of the British Army in Italy, and Major General Jean César Graziani, the C-in-C of the French Army in Italy, chatting before the presentation of decorations to soldiers of both armies after the Battle of the Piave River. Granezza, 12 July 1918.

At the still relatively young age of 49, Cavan was promoted to major general and given command of the 50th (Northumbrian) Division on 29 June 1915; a mere six weeks later he was appointed the first General Officer Commanding (GOC) of the Guards Division and, having been appointed Commander of the French Legion of Honour on 10 September 1915, he led his division at the Battle of Loos later that month. He was elected an Irish representative peer on 24 September 1915 and as such was one of the last to be so elected before the creation of the Irish Free State. In his role as GOC of the Guards Division he informed Major Winston Churchill of the latter's attachment to the 2nd Battalion of the Grenadiers, which formed part of his division, in November 1915.

The following January 1916, Cavan, "his star in the ascendant", was promoted to temporary lieutenant-general and was placed at the head of XIV Corps and took part in the Battle of the Somme that summer. He was made a Grand Officer of the Belgian Order of the Crown on 2 November 1916 and appointed a Knight of the Order of St Patrick on 18 November 1916.

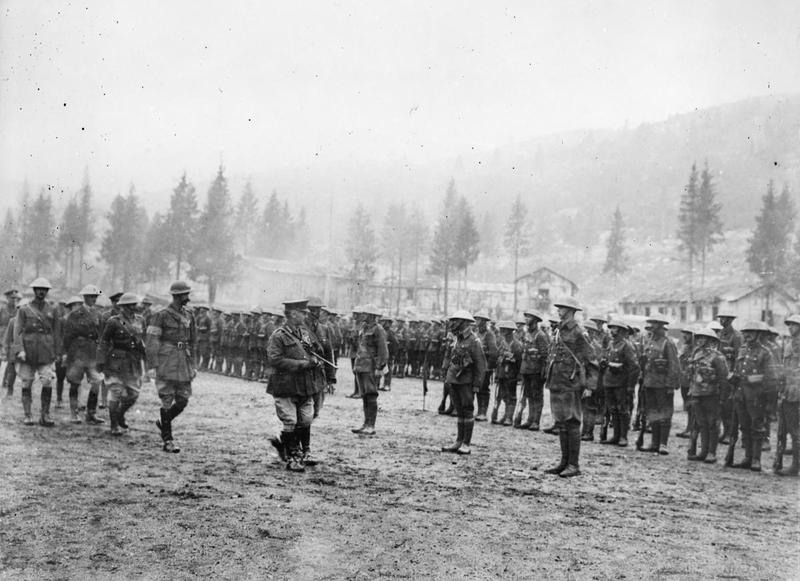
General The Earl of Cavan, commanding the British forces in Italy, inspecting men of the 48th (South Midland) Division, Granezza, Asiago, September, 1918.

Promoted to the substantive rank of lieutenant general on 1 January 1917, he led his corps at the Battle of Passchendaele in the summer and autumn of 1917, during which "XIV Corps achieved every objective it was given." He was awarded the rank of Grand Officer of the Legion of Honour on 25 September 1917.

=== Italy ===
He was redeployed with his corps to the Italian front in October 1917, after the Italians had suffered disastrously at the Battle of Caporetto. Advanced to Knight Commander of the Order of the Bath on 1 January 1918, Cavan was appointed commander-in-chief (C-in-C) of the British Forces in Italy on 10 March 1918, after his predecessor, General Sir Herbert Plumer, had been recalled to the Western Front after the Germans had launched their Spring offensive.

After reverses on the Western Front in March and April 1918, Prime Minister Lloyd George and the War Cabinet had been keen to remove Field Marshal Sir Douglas Haig as C-in-C of the BEF, but had been unable to agree on a suitable successor. In July Cavan was summoned to London, supposedly to discuss the Italian Front but in reality, as Cabinet Secretary Maurice Hankey put it, "to 'vet' him with a view to his replacing Haig". Hankey claimed to have dissuaded the prime minister by pointing to Cavan's lack of ideas as to how to defeat the Austro-Hungarians. Haig's victory at Amiens in August secured his position.

During Cavan’s time in Italy, one event has stood out in particular: the sudden and somewhat unexpected (and perhaps unjustified) relief of one of his three division commanders, Major-General Sir Robert Fanshawe, GOC 48th (South Midland) Division. Following the Battle of Asiago in June 1918, a fundamental disagreement arose regarding defensive tactics. Fanshawe had implemented a system of "elastic defence" or "defence in depth," which involved holding the front line thinly and maintaining strong reserves to counter-attack breakthroughs.

While this strategy eventually proved successful in containing the Austro-Hungarian advance and recapturing lost positions, Cavan took issue with the fact that the initial assault had successfully broken into the British front line, leading to significant, albeit temporary, losses of ground and prisoners. Cavan argued that Fanshawe had failed to sufficiently reinforce the front line despite warnings of an imminent attack delivered during a briefing on 14 June. From Cavan's perspective, the resulting casualties reflected a failure of generalship, particularly given the critical manpower shortages facing the army. Despite the division’s ultimate success in restoring the original line, Fanshawe was removed from his post on 20 June 1918 and replaced by Major-General Harold Walker.

On the Italian Front Cavan, who in late June was promoted to the temporary rank of general, led the Tenth Army which struck a decisive blow at the Battle of Vittorio Veneto, the action that sounded the final death knell of the Austro-Hungarian Army towards the close of the war.

Following the end of the war the King of Italy awarded him the War Cross for Military Valor and made him a Commander, and subsequently a Grand Officer, of the Military Order of Savoy as well as appointing him a Grand Officer of the Order of St Maurice and St Lazarus. Cavan was also appointed a Knight Grand Cross of the Order of St Michael and St George for his contribution to operations in Italy, awarded the American Distinguished Service Medal and appointed to the Chinese Order of Wen-Hu (1st Class).

== Postwar ==
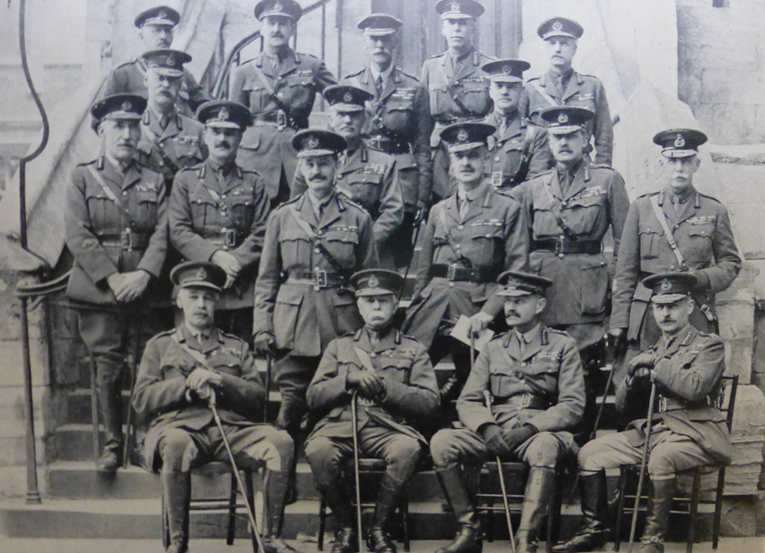
Eighteen Old Etonian generals revisit Eton, May 1919. General Cavan is sat in the front row on the extreme right

His first appointment after the war was when he became lieutenant of the Tower of London on 22 March 1920. Appointed aide-de-camp general to the King on 1 October 1920, he succeeded General Lord Rawlinson as general officer commanding-in-chief (GOC-in-C) of Aldershot Command on 2 November 1920 before being promoted to the substantive rank of general on 2 November 1921.

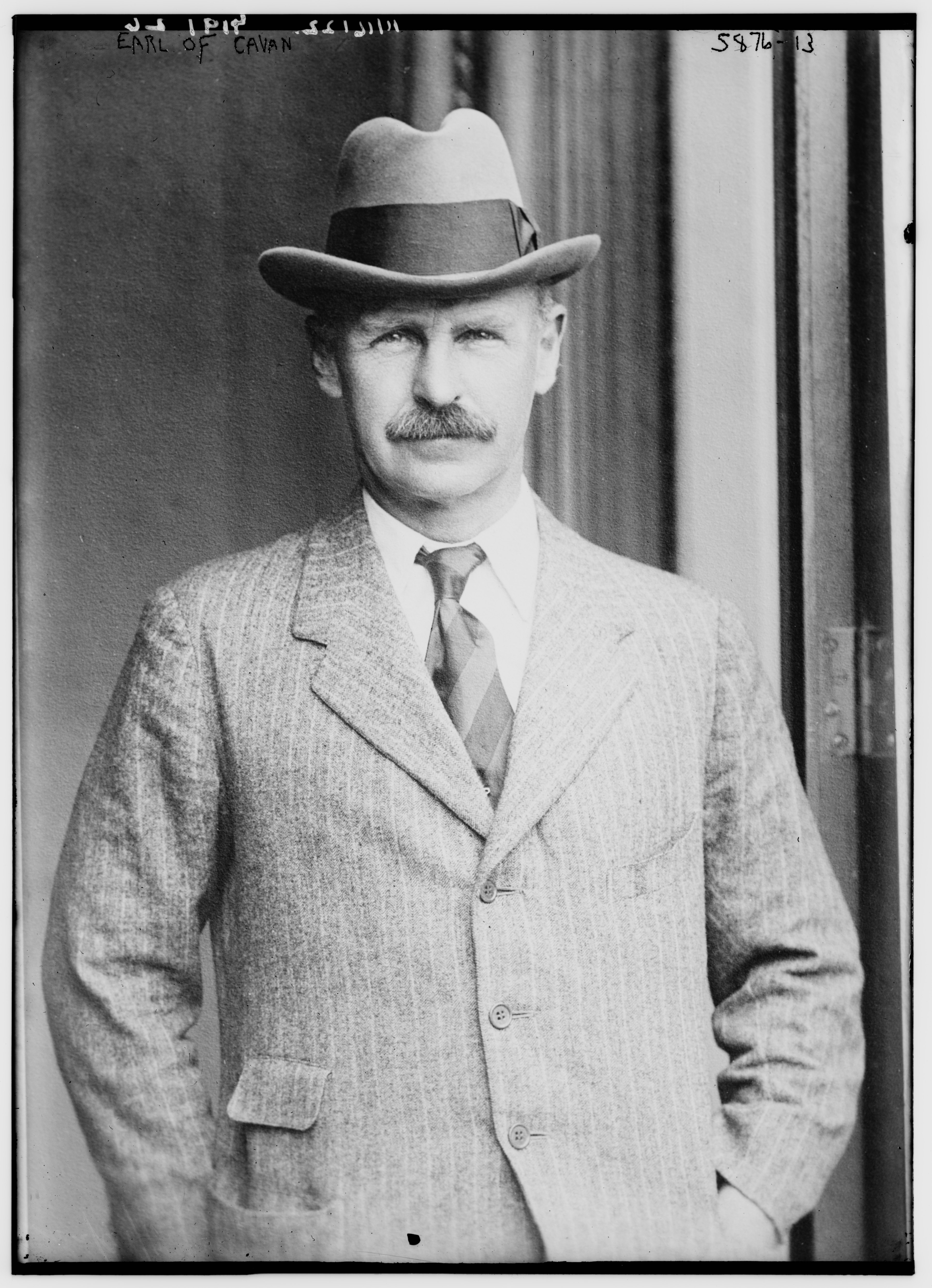
Lambart c. 1920–1925

He was appointed Chief of the Imperial General Staff on 19 February 1922. He may have been chosen as a steady man, the antithesis of his predecessor, General Sir Henry Wilson, whose relations with the government had deteriorated, and who was in Wilson's view more likely to agree to withdraw troops from Egypt and India. CIGS Cavan advised the Government on the implementation of the Geddes report, which advocated a large reduction in defence expenditure, and he officiated over a major reduction in the size of the British Army. He made a famous speech at the 'Royal Academy Banquet' to his equals in government and fellow peers and royalty. Advanced to Knight Grand Cross of the Order of the Bath in the New Year Honours 1926, he retired on 19 February 1926.

He was also colonel of the Irish Guards from 23 May 1925 and colonel of the Bedfordshire and Hertfordshire Regiment from 10 December 1928.

In May 1927, he accompanied the Duke and Duchess of York to Australia to open the Provisional Parliament House at Canberra, for which he was appointed a Knight Grand Cross of the Civil Division of the Order of the British Empire on 8 July 1927. He became Captain of the Honourable Corps of Gentlemen-at-Arms on 23 July 1929 and was promoted to field marshal on 31 October 1932. He also took part in the procession for the funeral of King George V in January 1936 and was the Field-Marshal Commanding the Troops for the coronation of George VI on 12 May 1937.

During the Second World War he served as Commanding Officer of the Hertfordshire Local Defence Volunteers. He died at the London Clinic in Devonshire Place in London on 28 August 1946.

He was buried in the family plot at the churchyard in Ayot St Lawrence, where a seven-foot-tall red granite cross is his headstone. His is the churchyard's only burial registered as Commonwealth war grave.

== Marriage and family ==
He married on 1 August 1893 to Caroline Inez Crawley (1870–1920), daughter of George Baden Crawley and Eliza Inez Hulbert, at Digswell Church in Digswell, Hertfordshire. She predeceased her husband; they had no children.

He married, secondly, on 27 November 1922, Lady Hester Joan Byng, daughter of Reverend Francis Byng, 5th Earl of Strafford and Emily Georgina Kerr, at St. Mark's Church in North Audley Street, Mayfair, London. His second wife was the niece of his army colleague Field Marshal Byng, who was a younger half-brother of the 5th Earl of Strafford. Hester, Countess of Cavan, was appointed a Dame Commander of the Order of the British Empire in 1927. The couple had two daughters:

- Lady Elizabeth Mary Lambart (16 October 1924 – 8 December 2016), married in 1949 to Mark Frederic Kerr Longman, President of the Longman Group Ltd, and had issue. She was in 1947 one of the eight bridesmaids in Princess Elizabeth's marriage to Lieutenant Philip Mountbatten. Her granddaughter is Rose Cholmondeley, Marchioness of Cholmondeley.
- Lady Joanna Lambart

As he had no son, the 10th Earl was succeeded by his brother, Horace.

== Bibliography ==
- French, David (1995). The Strategy of the Lloyd George Coalition. Oxford University Press. ISBN 978-0-19-820559-3.
- Heathcote, Tony (1999). The British Field Marshals 1736–1997. Barnsley: Pen and Sword Books. ISBN 0-85052-696-5.
- Senior, Michael (2023). Field Marshal the Earl of Cavan: Soldier and Fox Hunter. Pen and Sword Books. ISBN 978-1526758194.
- Wilks, Eileen; Wilks, John (1998). The British Army in Italy 1917–1918. Pen and Sword Books. ISBN 978-1-78346-171-4.

Military offices
Preceded by Sir Walter Lindsay	GOC 50th (Northumbrian) Division; June–August 1915	Succeeded by Sir Percival Wilkinson
New post	GOC Guards Division; 1915–1916	Succeeded by Geoffrey Feilding
Preceded by Lord Rawlinson	GOC-in-C Aldershot Command; 1920–1922	Succeeded by Sir Thomas Morland
Preceded by Sir Henry Wilson	Chief of the Imperial General Staff; 1922–1926	Succeeded by Sir George Milne
Political offices
Preceded by The Earl of Kilmorey	Representative peer for Ireland; 1915–1946	Office lapsed
Preceded by The Earl of Lucan	Captain of the Honourable Corps of Gentlemen-at-Arms; 1929–1931	Succeeded by The Earl of Lucan
Peerage of Ireland
Preceded by Frederick Lambart	Earl of Cavan; 1900–1946	Succeeded by Horace Lambart
