= Richard Lambart, 4th Earl of Cavan =

Irish peer

Richard Lambart, 4th Earl of Cavan PC (I) (died 10 March 1742) was an Irish peer.

He was the second but eldest surviving son of Charles Lambart, 3rd Earl of Cavan, and Castilina Gilbert, daughter of Henry Gilbert of Kilminchy and sister of St Leger Gilbert MP. He inherited the Earldom of Cavan in 1702, his eldest brother Charles having predeceased their father.

He married Margaret Trant, daughter of Richard Trant, Governor of Barbados, and had four children, including Ford Lambart, 5th Earl of Cavan, Gertrude who married William Fitzmaurice, 2nd Earl of Kerry. and Hester married in 1738 to Warner Westenra, son of Henry Westenra and Eleanor Allen.

Peerage of Ireland
Preceded by Charles Lambart	Earl of Cavan; 1702–1742	Succeeded by Ford Lambart
