= Roccasecca dei Volsci =

- Comune
- Comune di Roccasecca dei Volsci
- Location within Italy Location within Lazio
- Coordinates: 41°29′N 13°13′E
- Country: Italy
- Region: Lazio
- Province: Latina (LT)

Government
  - Mayor: Barbara Petroni

Area
  - Total: 23.6 km^{2} (9.1 sq mi)
- Elevation: 376 m (1,234 ft)

Population (31 May 2022)
  - Total: 1,033
  - Density: 43.8/km^{2} (113/sq mi)
- Demonym: Roccaseccani
- Time zone: UTC+1 (CET)
  - Summer (DST): UTC+2 (CEST)
- Postal code: 04010
- Dialing code: 0773
- Website: Official website

Roccasecca dei Volsci is a comune (municipality) in the Province of Latina in the Italian region Lazio, located about 80 miles (130 km) southeast of Rome and about 25 kilometres (16 mi) east of Latina.

Roccasecca dei Volsci borders the following municipalities: Amaseno, Priverno, Prossedi, Sonnino.

== Twin towns ==
- Saint-Romans, France
