= Horace Lambart, 11th Earl of Cavan =

Anglo-Irish soldier & Anglican priest (1878-1950)

The Right Honourable The Earl of Cavan TD

Earl of Cavan
- In office 1946–1950
- Preceded by: Rudolph Lambart
- Succeeded by: Michael Lambart

Personal details
- Born: 25 August 1878 Wheathampstead, Hertfordshire, England
- Died: 9 December 1950 (aged 72) Plex House, Hadnall, England
- Resting place: Ashes buried in the churchyard of St Martin's Church, Preston Gubbals
- Spouse: Audrey Kathleen Loder (m. 1907; died 1942)
- Children: 3
- Parents: Frederick Lambart, 9th Earl of Cavan; Mary Olive
- Education: Magdalen College, Oxford (B.A., 1901; M.A., 1904); Cuddesdon Theological College (1902)
- Occupation: Soldier, priest
- Military career
- Allegiance: United Kingdom
- Branch: British Army
- Service years: 1900–1919
- Rank: Lieutenant
- Units: City of London Imperial Volunteers; Oxfordshire Light Infantry; Shropshire Yeomanry
- Conflicts: Second Boer War; World War I

The Venerable Horace Edward Samuel Sneade Lambart, 11th Earl of Cavan, TD (25 August 1878 – 9 December 1950), was an Anglo-Irish soldier and Anglican priest.

== Early life and education ==
Lambart was born at Wheathampstead, Hertfordshire, and was educated at Charterhouse School and graduated from Magdalen College, Oxford, as BA in 1901 and MA in 1904. At university he was an oarsman in the Oxford University Eight oar trial race for three years, with interval for Boer War service. He also rowed bow in the winning four of the University College Prize Medal Four Oars.

== Military service ==
At Charterhouse, he joined the school's Cadet Corps in 1893, and was commissioned while still a boy in 1897.

In 1899, while at university, Lambart was commissioned Lieutenant in the 1st Volunteer Battalion, Oxfordshire Light Infantry. He renounced his commission to enlist, through the Inns of Court Rifles, into the London City Imperial Volunteers in 1900, after the outbreak of the Boer War.

In South Africa, he served from 1900 to 1902 as Private in the CIV despatch cyclist section, much of the time under Lord Kitchener's personal orders.

He was regimental chaplain to the Shropshire Yeomanry from 1909. He was mobilised at the outbreak of the First World War and accompanied the regiment to Egypt but left in December 1916 to take up his civilian post as Archdeacon of Salop. He continued after the war from 1919, and was awarded the Territorial Decoration in 1931.

== Marriage ==
On 9 July 1907, he married Audrey Kathleen Loder (died 8 April 1942), daughter of Lt.-Col. Alfred Basil Loder. they had three children, one of whom, Mary Veronica Lambart, married Colonel Edward Cadogan, a cricketer.

== Religious life ==
Lambart completed theological study in 1902 at Cuddesdon Theological College near Oxford, and was ordained priest in 1903. He was Curate at St Dunstan's, Stepney, in east London from 1903 to 1908, after which his life and ministry were spent in Shropshire.

He was the Vicar of Holy Trinity, Leaton, near Shrewsbury (1908 to 1913), of Market Drayton (1913 to 1918), and of St Mary's, Shrewsbury, from 1918 to 1925. He held the office of Archdeacon of Salop and Prebendary of Pipa Parva in Lichfield Cathedral from 1917 to 1946. He retired from full-time ministry in 1946 but was made Archdeacon Emeritus. He was also Provost of Denstone College from 1928 to 1948, with oversight over the Woodard Schools in the West Midlands.

== Later life ==
The Earl, who succeeded his brother the 10th Earl of Cavan (who had died without sons) in 1946, died at his home, Plex House, Hadnall, near Shrewsbury, in December 1950, aged 72. After cremation in Birmingham, his ashes were buried in the churchyard at Preston Gubbals near his home.

Peerage of Ireland
Preceded by Rudolph Lambart	Earl of Cavan; 1946–1950	Succeeded by Michael Lambart
