= Frederick Lambart, 9th Earl of Cavan =

British politician and Royal Navy officer (1839-1900)

The Right Honourable The Earl of Cavan KP, PC, DL, JP
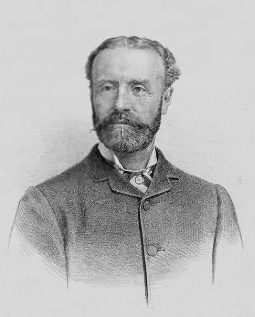
- Frederick Lambart, 9th Earl of Cavan

Vice-Chamberlain of the Household
- In office 19 February 1886 – 20 July 1886
- Monarch: Victoria
- Prime Minister: William Ewart Gladstone
- Preceded by: Viscount Lewisham
- Succeeded by: Viscount Lewisham

Personal details
- Born: 21 October 1839
- Died: 14 July 1900 (aged 60) Wheathampstead, Hertfordshire, England
- Party: Liberal
- Spouse: Mary Olive (m. 1863)
- Children: Rudolph Lambart, 10th Earl of Cavan; Lady Ellen Lambart; Lady Maud Birkbeck; The Hon. Lionel Lambart; Horace Lambart, 11th Earl of Cavan
- Parents: Frederick Lambart, 8th Earl of Cavan; Hon. Caroline Littleton

Frederick Edward Gould Lambart, 9th Earl of Cavan KP, PC, DL, JP (21 October 1839 – 14 July 1900) styled Viscount Kilcoursie until 1887, was an Anglo-Irish Royal Navy officer and Liberal politician. He served as Vice-Chamberlain of the Household in 1886 in William Ewart Gladstone's third administration.

== Background ==
Kilcoursie was the eldest son of Frederick Lambart, 8th Earl of Cavan, and his wife, Hon. Caroline Augusta Littleton, daughter of Edward Littleton, 1st Baron Hatherton.

== Military career ==
Kilcoursie was a lieutenant in the Royal Navy and served at the Siege of Sebastopol in 1854–55. He was also at the bombardment of Canton in 1856, and at the attack on Peiho Forts in 1858.

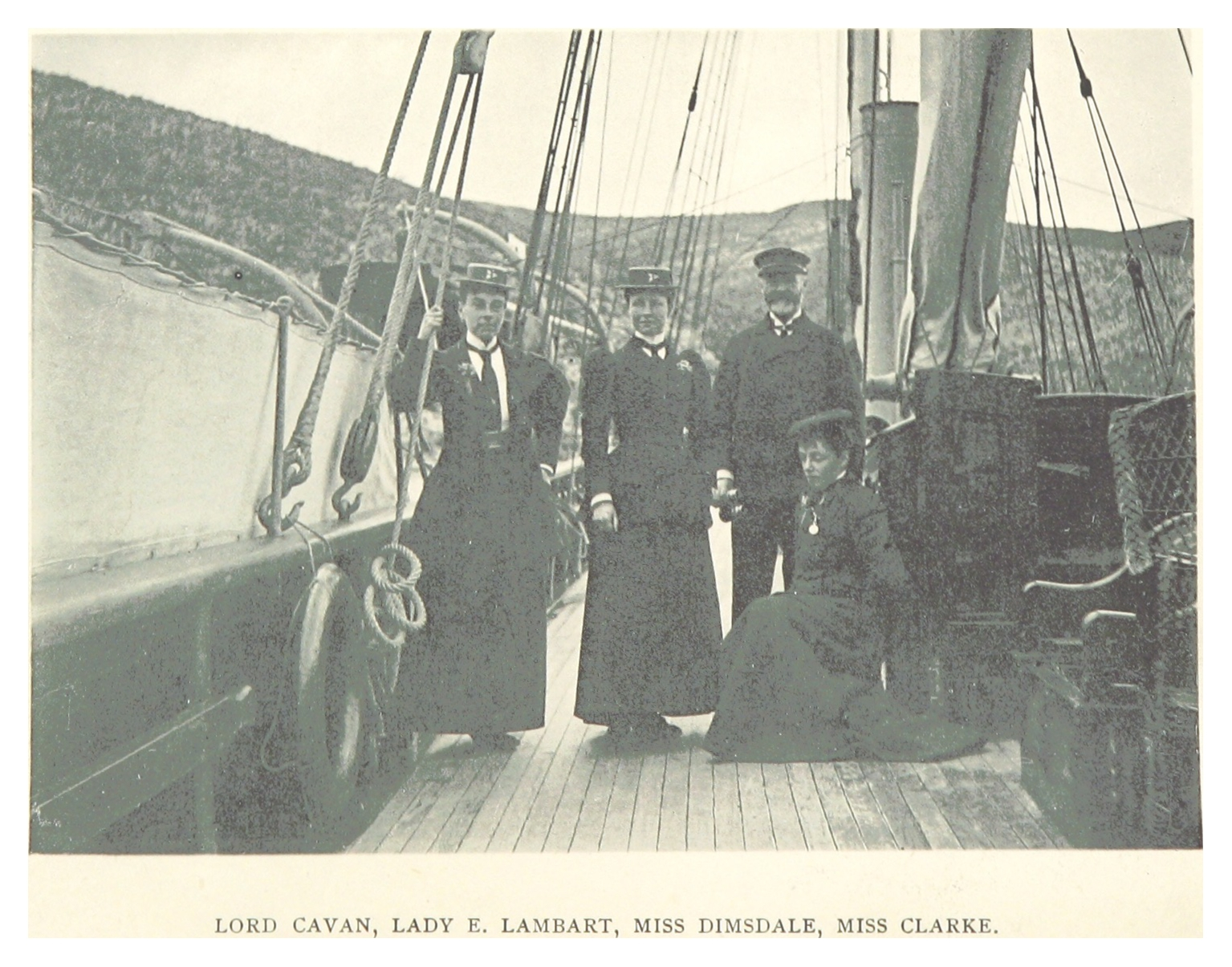
Lord Cavan with friends on his yacht Roseneath, in 1895

== Political career ==
Kilcoursie stood unsuccessfully for parliament for Taunton in February 1882 and for Somerset in February 1884. At the 1885 general election, he was returned for South Somerset, a seat he until he stood down at the 1892 general election. In February 1886 he was sworn of the Privy Council and appointed Vice-Chamberlain of the Household in William Ewart Gladstone's Liberal Government, which he remained until the administration fell in July of the same year. He succeeded in the earldom on the death of his father in 1887. As this was an Irish peerage it did not entitle him to an automatic seat in the House of Lords and he was allowed to remain in the House of Commons. In 1894 he was invested a Knight of St Patrick. Lord Cavan was also a Justice of the Peace and Deputy Lieutenant for Somerset and a Justice of the Peace for Hertfordshire.

== Retirement ==
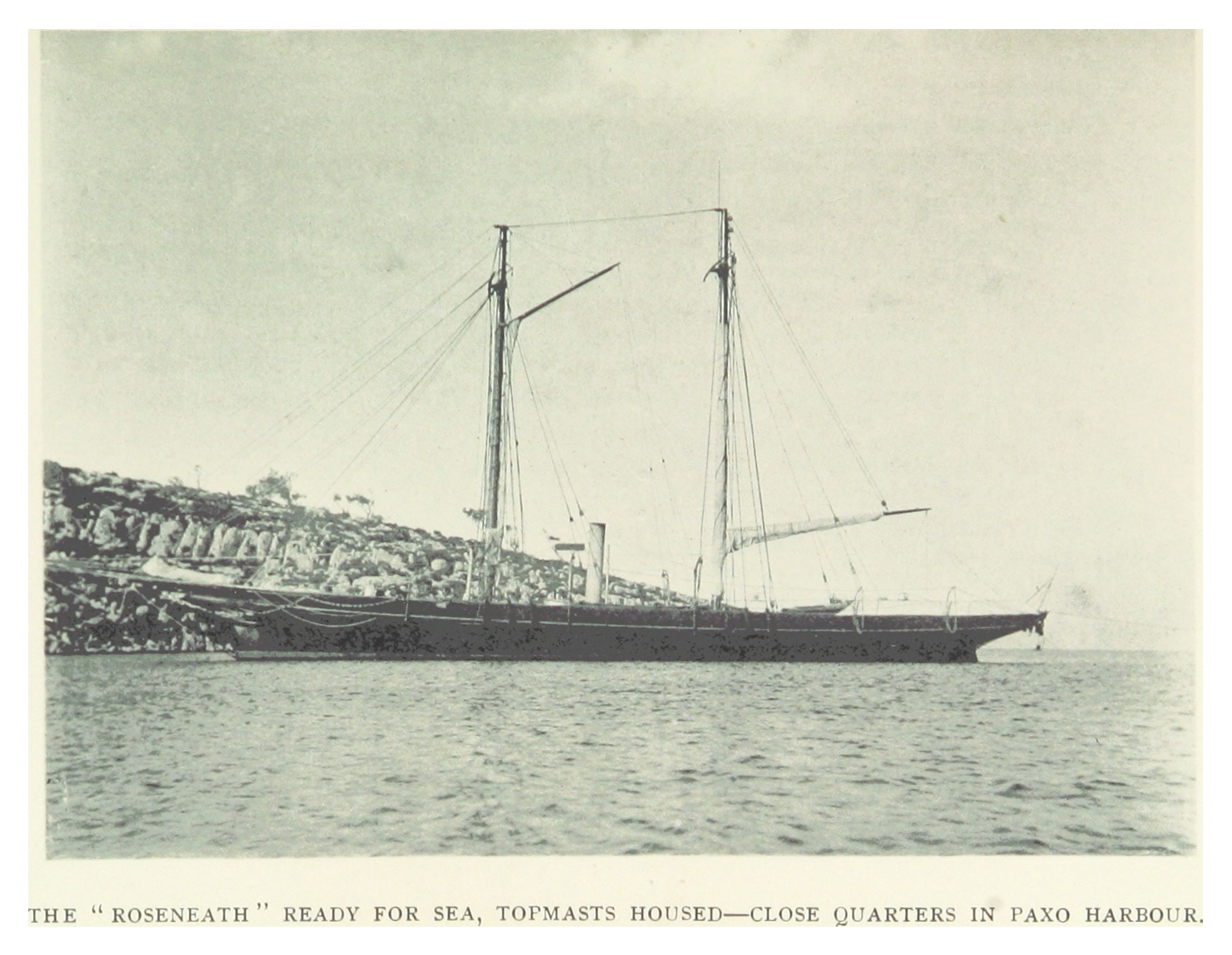
The Roseneath in Paxo Harbour 1895

He wrote two books covering his extended holidays taken on his steam yacht Roseneath: With the Yacht, Camera, and Cycle in the Mediterranean (1895), 95 plates, and With the Yacht, Camera, and Cycle in Eastern Waters (1897), 58 plates and 1 folding map.

== Death ==
Lord Cavan died at Wheathampstead, Hertfordshire, in July 1900, aged 60, and was succeeded by his eldest son, Frederick. The Countess of Cavan died at Wheathampstead House, Hertfordshire, in August 1905, aged 59.

== Family ==
Lord Cavan married Mary Sneade Olive (1846–1905), only child of Reverend John Olive, Rector of Ayot St Lawrence, Hertfordshire, in 1863. They had three sons and two daughters:

- Field Marshal Frederick Rudolph Lambart, 10th Earl of Cavan (1865–1946).
- Lady Ellen Olive Lambart (1867–1945), died unmarried.
- Lady Maud Edith Gundreda Lambart (1869–1940). She married, firstly, Henry J. Barrett, in 1892, and, secondly, Geoffrey Birkbeck.
- Captain the Honourable Lionel John Olive Lambart (1873–1940), married in 1906 an American heiress, Adelaide Douglas Randolph, and had one daughter, Lady Edith Foxwell "The Queen of London Cafe Society".
- The Venerable Horace Edward Samuel Sneade Lambart, 11th Earl of Cavan (1878–1950).

Parliament of the United Kingdom
New constituency	Member of Parliament for South Somerset; 1885–1892	Succeeded by Edward Strachey
Political offices
Preceded by Viscount Lewisham	Vice-Chamberlain of the Household; 1886	Succeeded by Viscount Lewisham
Peerage of Ireland
Preceded by Frederick Lambart	Earl of Cavan; 1887–1900	Succeeded by Rudolph Lambart
