= Richard Lambart, 7th Earl of Cavan =

British Army general (1763–1837)

General The Right Honourable The Earl of Cavan
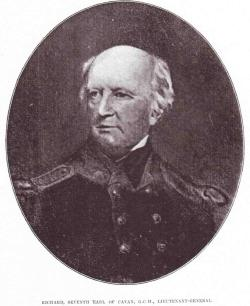
- Born: 10 September 1763
- Died: 21 November 1837 (aged 74)

Richard Ford William Lambart, 7th Earl of Cavan (10 September 1763 – 21 November 1837), styled Viscount Kilcoursie from 1772 to 1778, was a British military commander throughout the Napoleonic era and beyond.

He became head of the British Army in Egypt. He suggested to the British government the removal of the obelisk known as Cleopatra's Needle, for long centuries embedded in the sand near Alexandria, Egypt. The undertaking was considered too costly and not taken up until 1877, and the obelisk now stands on the London Embankment to commemorate the conclusion of the Napoleonic Wars.

== Biography ==
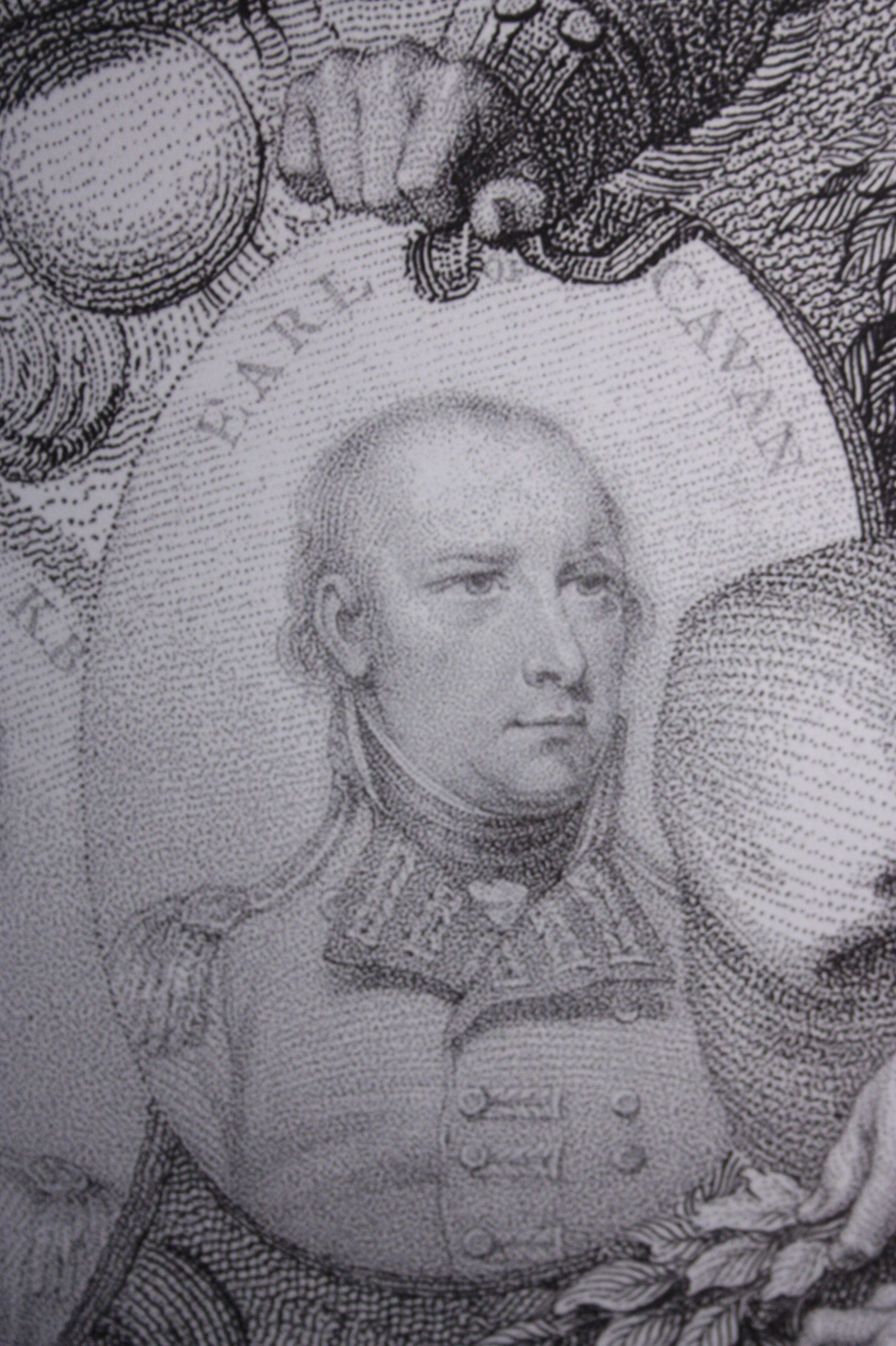
7th Earl of Cavan in 1801

He was born into an Anglo-Irish aristocratic family, the only son of The 6th Earl of Cavan, whom he succeeded in 1778, and his second wife Elizabeth Davies, daughter of William Davies.

He was commissioned as an ensign in the Coldstream Guards in 1779. In 1798 he was promoted to Major-General, and in 1800 he commanded a Division in Egypt under Abercromby. In command of a Brigade of Guards under General Eyre Coote, he took part in the Siege of Alexandria in 1801. He appears as one of a number of Heroes of the Egypt Campaign in a commemorative engraving of 1802.

He was Colonel of the 2nd Battalion, 68th Foot between 1801 and 1802. In 1805 he was promoted to Lieutenant-General. He was Colonel of the 2nd West Indian Regiment between 1805 and 1808. He was Colonel of the 77th Foot between 1808 and 1811. Promoted to full general in 1814, he was Colonel of the 58th Regiment of Foot between 1811 and 1823. He was a General Officer and Colonel of the 45th Regiment of Foot between 1823 and 1837.

Between 1813 and 1837, he held the office of Governor of Calshot Castle, a sinecure abolished after his death.

== Family ==
Lambart married first Honora Margaretta, the daughter of Sir Henry Gould the younger (1710–1794). He then married Lydia, daughter of William Arnold. She was sister of Thomas Arnold, headmaster of Rugby School, and died aged 78 of consumption in 1862 at Tunbridge Wells, Kent.

The children of Lambart and his first wife, Honora, include:

- Richard Henry Robert Gilbert Lambart, Viscount Kilcoursie (1783–1785)
- Honora Elizabeth Esther Lambart (b. 29 April 1784)
- Alicia Margaretta Hockmore Lambart (b. 1 August 1785)
- Richard Henry Lambart, Viscount Kilcoursie (1788–1788)
- George Frederick Augustus Lambart, Viscount Kilcoursie (1789–1828)

== Notes ==
Military offices
Preceded by Sir William Myers	Colonel of the 2nd West India Regiment; 1805–1808	Succeeded by Eyre Power Trench
Preceded by Albemarle Bertie	Colonel of the 77th (East Middlesex) Regiment of Foot; 1808–1811	Succeeded by Sir Charles Hastings
Preceded by George Scott	Colonel of the 58th (Rutlandshire) Regiment of Foot; 1811–1823	Succeeded by The Lord Lynedoch
Preceded by Frederick Cavendish Lister	Colonel of the 45th (Nottinghamshire) Regiment of Foot; 1823–1837	Succeeded by Sir William Henry Pringle
Preceded by Sir Harry Burrard	Governor of Calshot Castle; 1813–1837	Office abolished
Peerage of Ireland
Preceded by Richard Lambart	Earl of Cavan; 1778–1837	Succeeded by Frederick Lambart
