= List of composers of African descent =

This is a list of composers of African ancestry.

== A ==
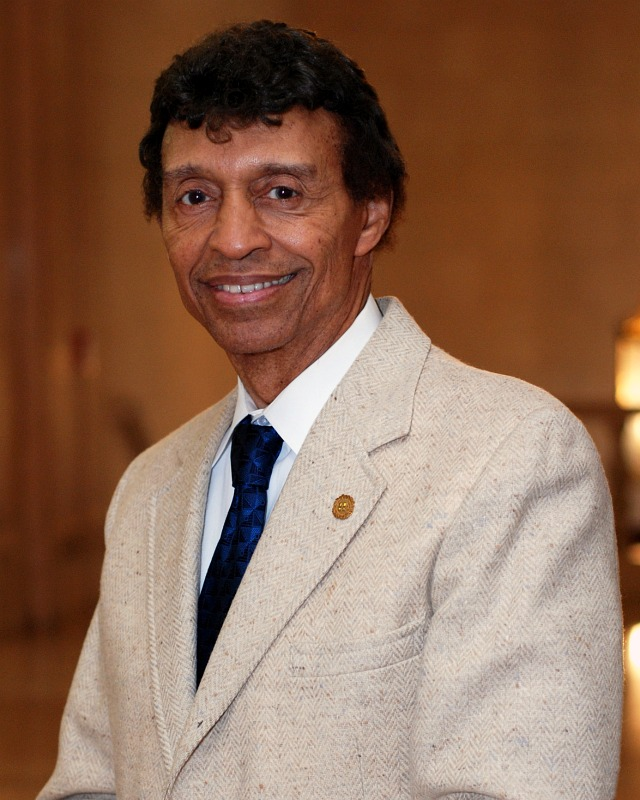
H. Leslie Adams

- Michael Abels, US (born 1962)
- Mohamed Abdelwahab Abdelfattah, Egypt (born 1962)
- Muhal Richard Abrams, US (1930–2017)
- H. Leslie Adams, US (1932–2024)
- Eleanor Alberga, Jamaica (born 1949)
- Alcione, Brazil (born 1947)
- Amanda Christina Elizabeth Aldridge (Montague Ring), England (1866–1956)
- Kenneth Amis, US (born 1970)
- Thomas Jefferson Anderson (TJ), US (born 1928)
- Lil Hardin Armstrong, US (1898–1971)

== B ==
- David Baker, US (1931–2016)
- Count Basie (1904–1984), US, pianist, bandleader
- Leon Bates (1949–2025), US, pianist
- Catalina Berroa, Cuba (1849–1911)
- Eubie Blake (James Hubert Blake), US (1887–1983)
- James A. Bland, US (1854–1911)
- Margaret Allison Bonds, US (1913–1972)
- John William Boone, US (1864–1927)
- Brittney Boykin (born 1989), US, pianist
- Anthony Braxton, US (born 1945)
- George Bridgetower, Poland (1779–1860), violinist and composer
- Courtney Bryan, US (born 1982/1983), pianist and composer
- James Tim Brymn, US (1881–1946)
- Harry Burleigh, US (1866–1949)

== C ==
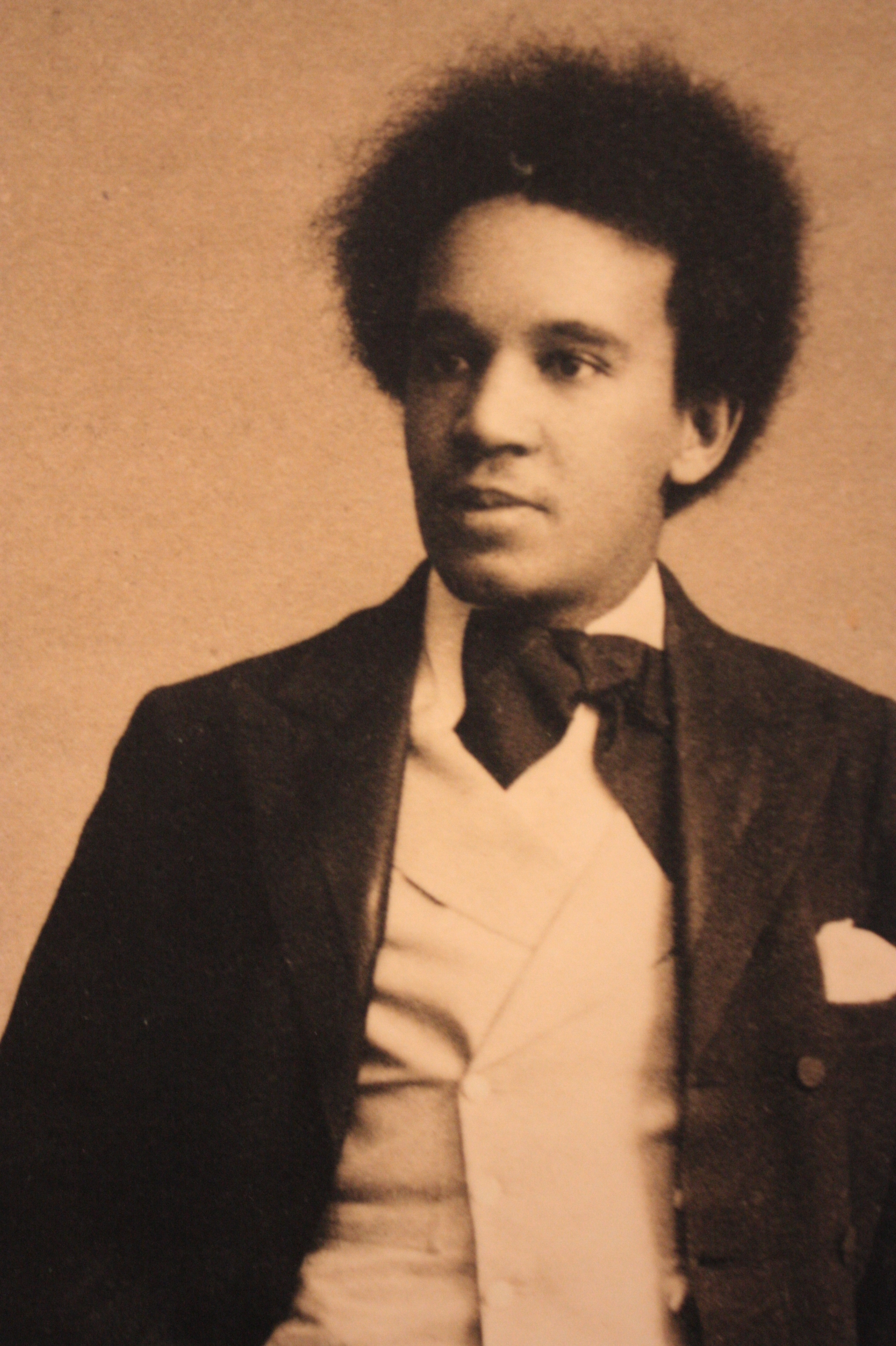
Samuel Coleridge-Taylor c. 1893

- Billy Childs, US (born 1957)
- Robert Allen "Bob" Cole, US (1868–1911)
- Samuel Coleridge-Taylor, England (1875–1912)
- Ornette Coleman, US (1930–2015)
- Alice Coltrane, US (1937–2007)
- John Coltrane, US (1926–1967)
- Geraldine Connor, UK (1952–2011)
- Will Marion Cook, US (1869–1944)
- Roque Cordero, Panama (1917–2008)
- Arthur Cunningham, US (1928–1997)

== D ==
- William L. Dawson, US (1899–1990)
- Anthony Davis, US (born 1951)
- Gussie Lord Davis, US (1863–1899)
- Edmond Dédé, US (1827–1903)
- Leonard De Paur, US (1914–1998)
- Robert Nathaniel Dett, Canada (1882–1943)
- John Thomas Douglass, US (1847–1886)
- Rudolph Dunbar, Guyana (1907–1988)
- Leslie Dunner, US (born 1956)

== E ==
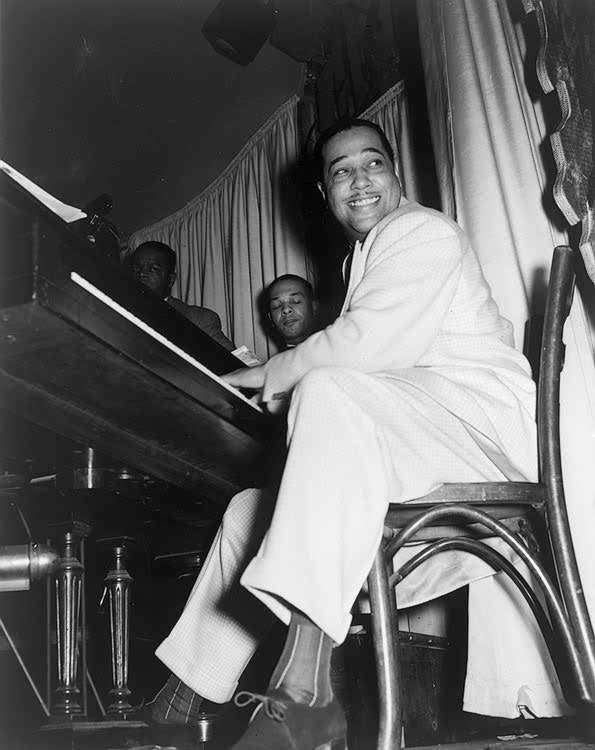
Duke Ellington at the Hurricane Club, Broadway, NYC

- Julius Eastman, US (1940–1990)
- Justin Elie, Haiti (1883–1931)
- Duke Ellington (Edward Kennedy Ellington), US (1899–1974), jazz big band leader
- Mercer Ellington, US (1919–1996)
- Joseph Antonio Emidy, Guinea (1775–1835)
- Akin Euba, Nigeria (1935–2020)
- James Reese Europe, US (1881–1919)

== F ==
- Donal Fox, US (born 1952)

== G ==
- José Maurício Nunes Garcia, Brazil (1767–1830)
- Philip Gbeho, Ghana (1904–1976)
- Kerry J. Gilliard, US (born 1972)
- Harry P. Guy, US (1870–1950)

== H ==
- Adolphus Hailstork, US (born 1941)
- W. C. Handy (William Christopher Handy), US (1873–1958), blues
- Edward W. Hardy, US (born 1992), composer, violinist
- Robert A. Harris, US (born 1938)
- Henry Hart, US (1839–1915)
- Scott Hayden, US (1882–1915), ragtime
- Talib Rasul Hakim, US (1940–1988)
- HAUI, UK (born 1990)
- Fletcher Henderson, US (1897–1952), jazz big band leader
- Ernest Hogan, US (1865–1909)
- Moses Hogan, US (1957–2003)
- David Hurd, US (born 1950)

== I ==
- Abdullah Ibrahim, South Africa (1934–2026)

== J ==
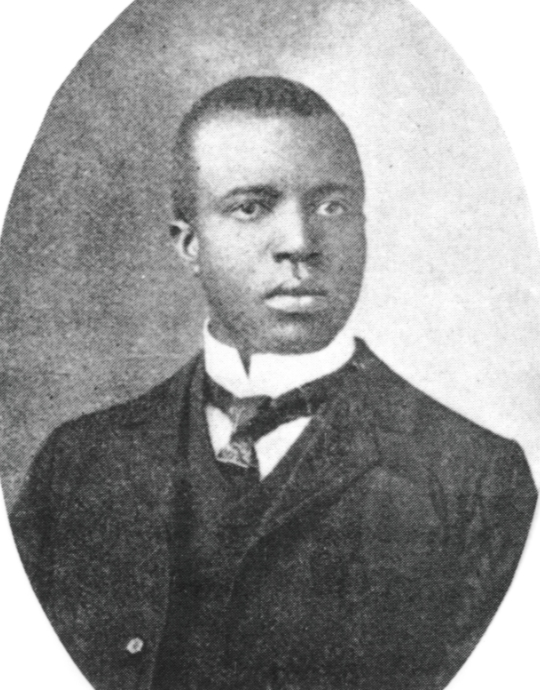
Scott Joplin

- Michael Jackson, US (1958–2009), singer-songwriter, producer, dancer, choreographer, musician, businessman
- Tony Jackson, US (1876–1921), pianist
- Leroy Jenkins, US (1932–2007)
- Jose Julian Jiménez, Cuba (1823–1880)
- Lico Jiménez (José Manuel Jiménez Berroa), Cuba (1851–1917)
- Francis Johnson, US (1792–1844)
- Hall Johnson, US (1888–1970)
- James Price Johnson, US (1894–1955)
- J. Rosamond Johnson, US (1873–1954)
- Victor C. Johnson, US (born 1978)
- Irving Jones, US (1873–1932) ragtime composer
- Trevor Jones, South Africa and United Kingdom (born 1949), film composer
- Scott Joplin, US (1868–1917)
- Quincy Jones, US (1933–2024)
- Joe Jordan, US (1882–1971)

== K ==
- Ulysses Simpson Kay, US (1917–1995)
- Thomas Henderson Kerr Jr., US (1915–1988)

== L ==
- Vicente Lusitano, Portugal, born in the early 1500s
- Charles Lucien Lambert, US (c. 1828–1896)
- Lucien-Léon Guillaume Lambert, France (1858–1945)
- Sidney Lambert, US (1838–1905)
- Ludovic Lamothe, Haiti (1882–1953)
- Tania León, Cuba (born 1943)
- John Lewis, US (1920–2001)
- Melba Liston, US (1926–1999)
- Sam Lucas, US (1850–1916)

== M ==
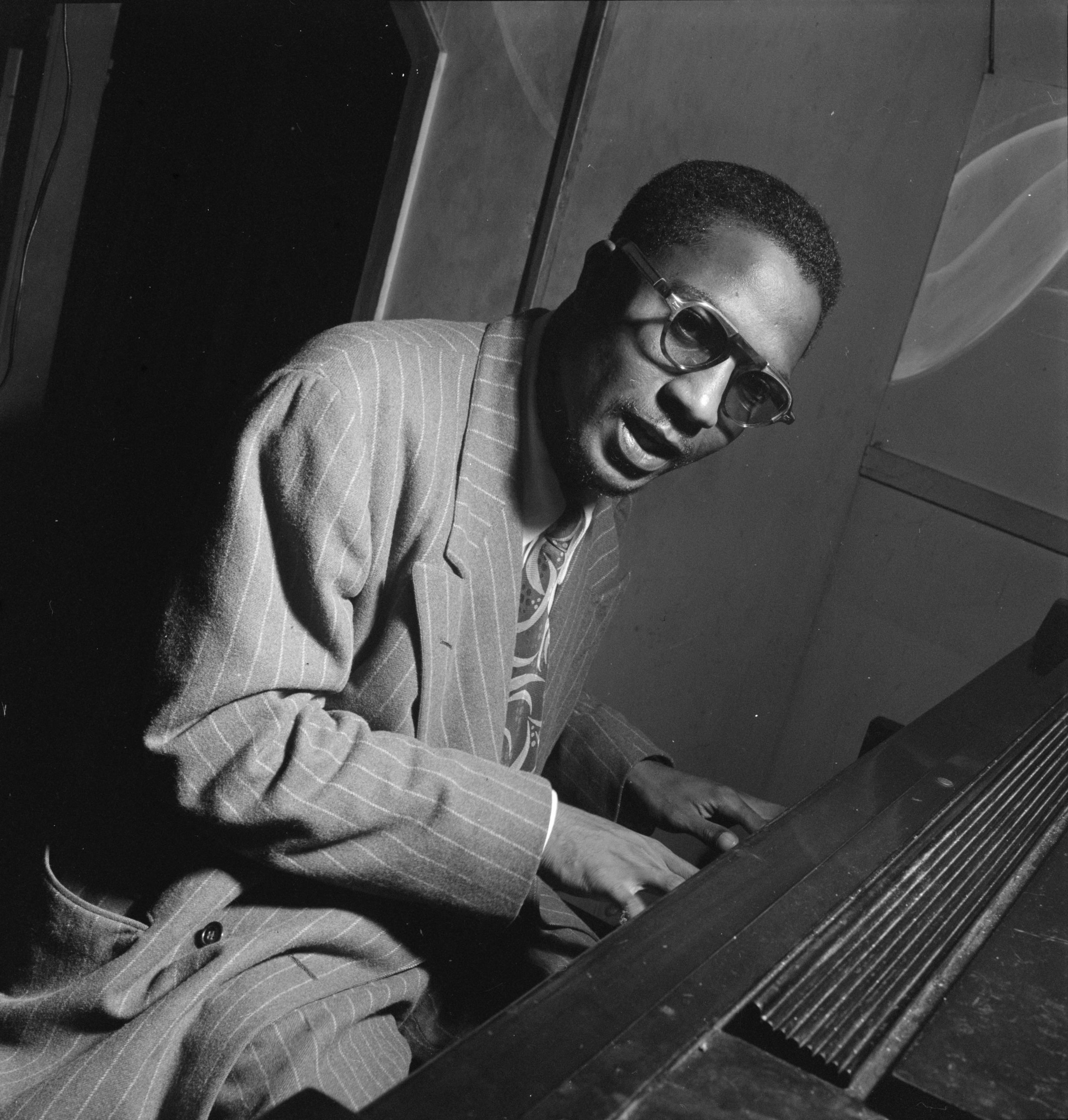
Thelonious Monk at Minton's Playhouse, 1947

- Bobby McFerrin (Robert McFerrin Jr.), US (born 1950), jazz composer-vocalist-conductor
- Wynton Marsalis, US (born 1961)
- Arthur Marshall, US (1881–1968), ragtime
- Paul D. Miller aka DJ Spooky, US (born 1970)
- Charles Mingus, US (1922–1979)
- Roscoe Mitchell, US (born 1940)
- Thelonious Monk, US (1917–1982)
- Carman Moore, US (born 1936)
- Undine Smith Moore, US (1904–1989)
- Jeffrey Mumford, US (born 1955)
- Diedre Murray, US (born 1951)
- Billy Myles (William Myles Nobles), US (1924–2005)

== N ==
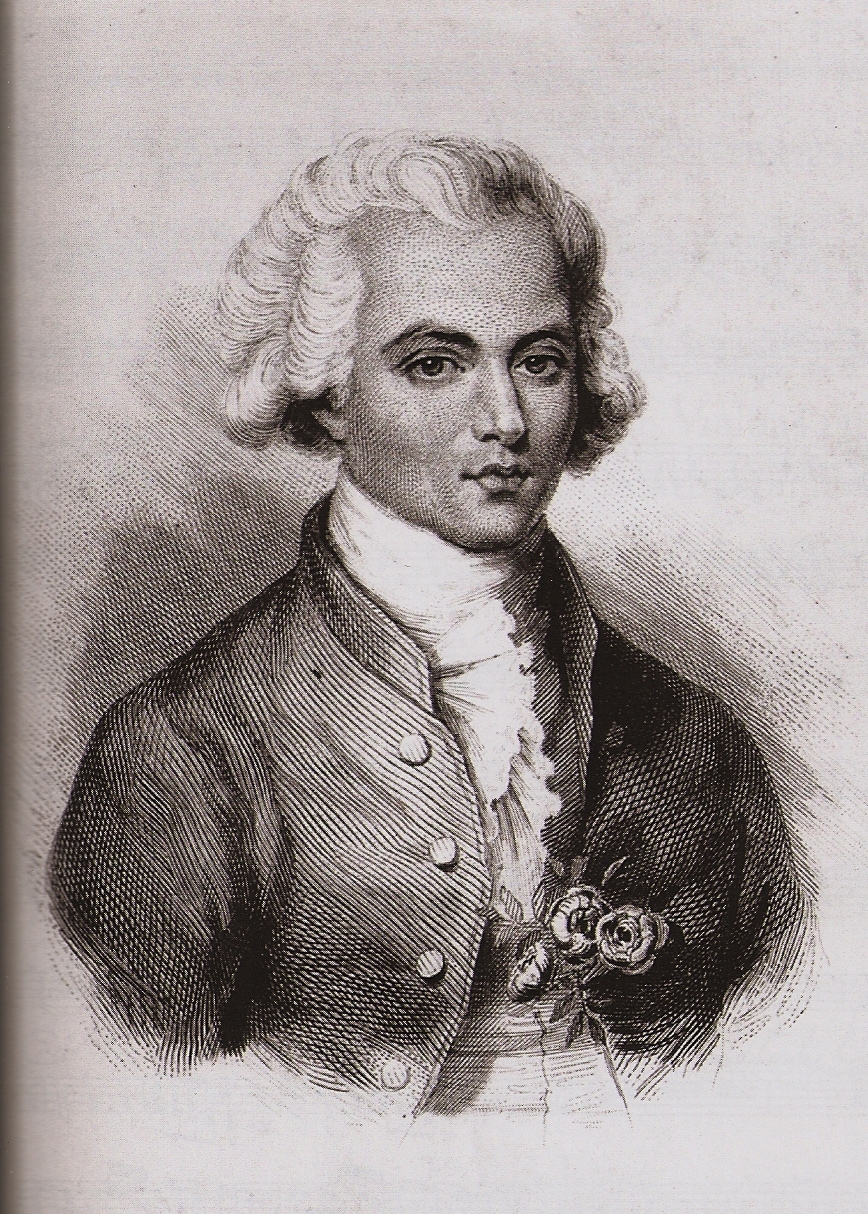
Saint-Georges in 1768, aged 22

- Brian Raphael Nabors, US (born 1991)
- Gary Powell Nash, US (born 1964)
- Oliver Nelson, US (1932–1975)
- J. H. Kwabena Nketia, Ghana (1921–2019)

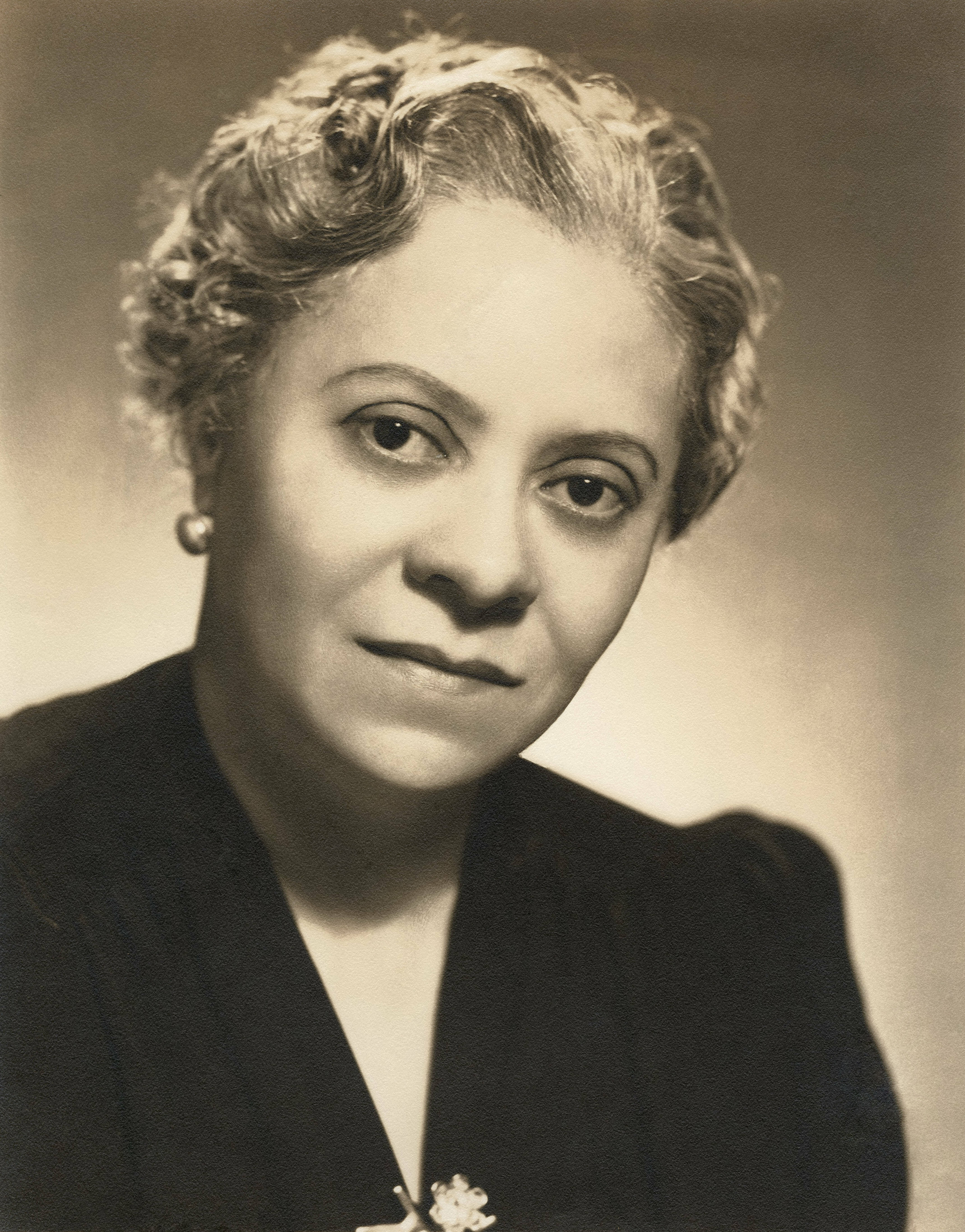
Price, date unknown

== O ==
- Frank Owens, US (1933–2023)

== P ==
- Coleridge-Taylor Perkinson, US (1932–2004)
- Julia Perry, US (1924–1979)
- Zenobia Powell Perry, US (1908–2004)
- Marvin Peterson, US (born 1948), jazz composer
- Armand John Piron, US (1888–1943)
- Florence Beatrice Price, US (1887–1953)
- Prince, US (1958–2016)

== R ==
- Amadeo Roldán, Cuba (1900–1939)
- Sonny Rollins, US (1930–2026)

== S ==
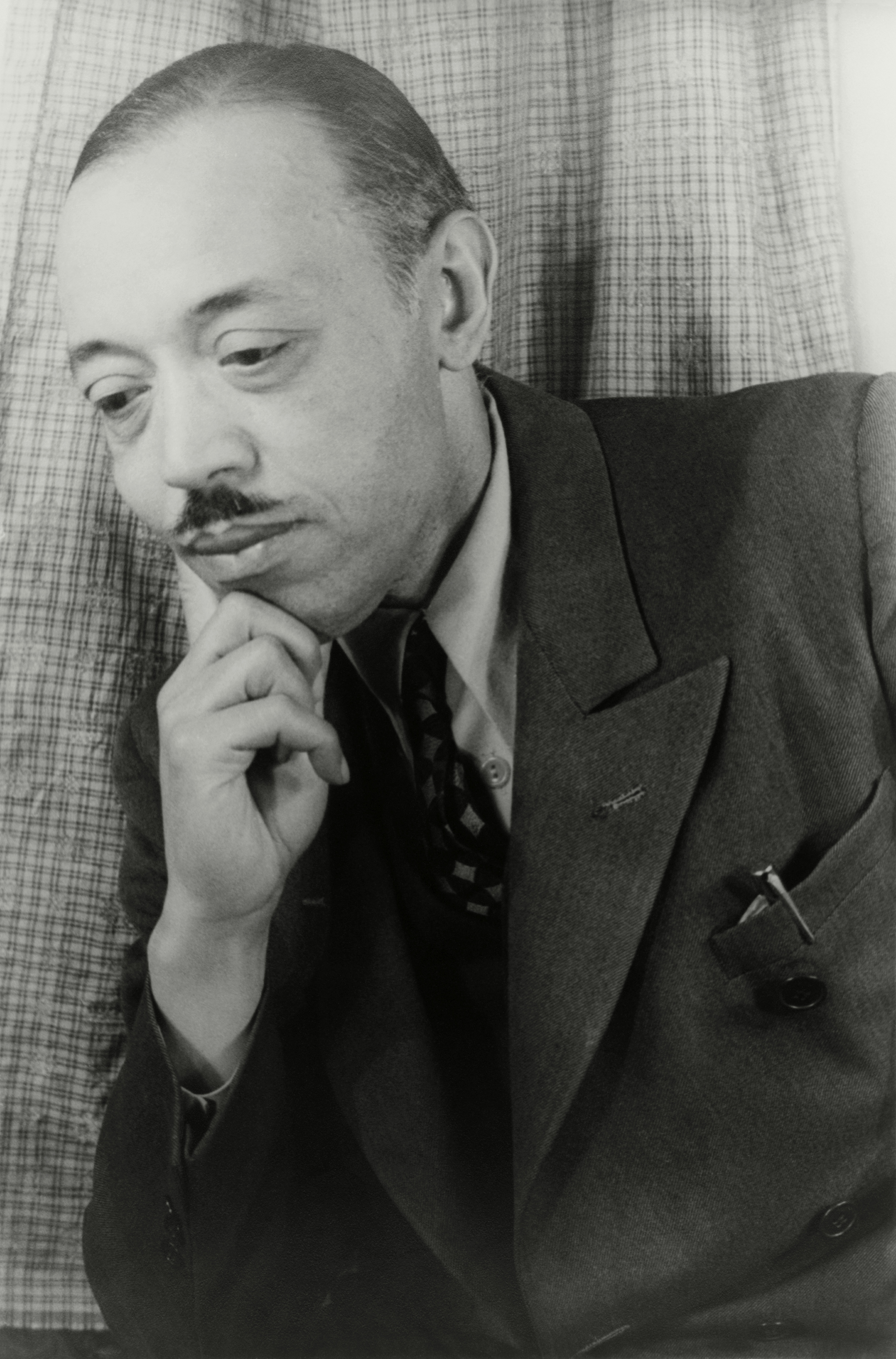
William Grant Still

- Chevalier de Saint-Georges, Guadeloupe (c. 1739–1799)
- Ignatius Sancho, England (c. 1729–1780)
- James Scott, US (1886–1938)
- Jacob J. Sawyer, US (1856–1885)
- Wayne Shorter, US (1933–2023)
- Alvin Singleton, US (born 1940)
- Chris Smith, US (1879–1949)
- Hale Smith, US (1925–2009)
- Fela Sowande, Nigeria (1905–1987)
- William Grant Still, US (1895–1978)
- Howard Swanson, US (1907–1978)
- Billy Strayhorn (William Thomas Strayhorn), US (1917–1967), one of the most highly regarded jazz and big band composers and arrangers; Ellington's friend and arranger

== T ==
- Shirley Thompson, English-born composer of Jamaican descent
- Henry Threadgill, US (born 1944), jazz composer
- Dean Clay Taylor, US (born 1943), classical composer

== W ==
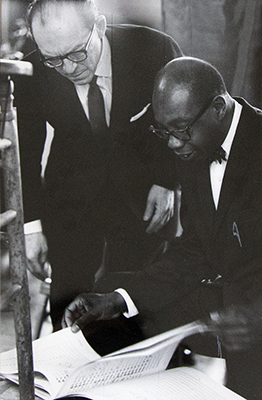
George Walker at right

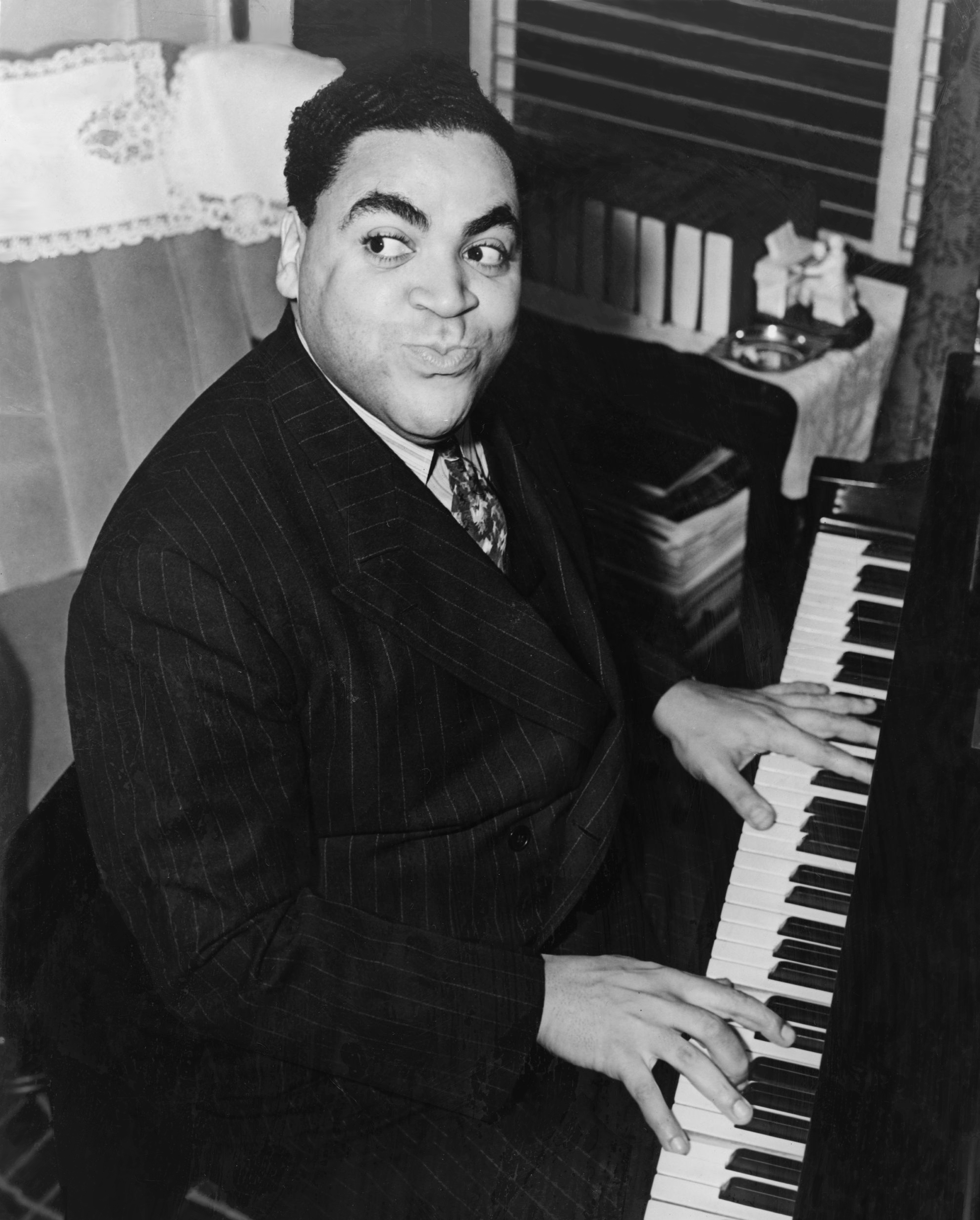
Fats Waller

- George Walker, US (1922–2018)
- Fats Waller, US (1904–1943), singer, jazz musician
- Pete Wentz (born 1979), bassist of the band Fall Out Boy
- Randy Weston, US (1926–2018)
- Clarence Cameron White, US (1880–1960)
- Joseph White (José Silvestre White Lafitte) Cuba (1835–1918)
- Thomas Wiggins (Bethune) or "Blind Tom", US (1849–1908)
- Clarence Williams, US (1898–1965)
- Julius Penson Williams, US (born 1954)
- Mary Lou Williams, US (1910–1981)
- Olly Wilson, US (1937–2018)
- John Wesley Work III, US (1901–1967)
- Stevie Wonder (born 1950)

== Z ==
- Pamela Z, US (born 1956)

Dates of birth and death are unknown for several composers whose music, published during the 19th century, is described in "Historical Notes on African-American and Jamaican Melodies". These composers include Harry Bloodgood, Samuel Butler, Dudley C. Clark, Harry Davis, Pete Devonear, Fred C. Lyons, Henry Newman, James S. Putnam, and Francis V. Seymour.

== See also ==
- Lists of African Americans
- Negermusik
