= Nolasco =

Nolasco is a surname of Spanish/Portuguese origin. In 2014 the surname was most commonly found in Mexico (over 47 thousand bearers), the Philippines (over 18 thousand bearers), Brazil and Honduras (over 10 thousand bearers each).

Notable people with this surname include:

- Alejandro Nolasco (born 1991), Spanish politician
- Amaury Nolasco (born 1970), Dominican-American actor
- Bruno Nolasco (born 1986), Brazilian water polo player
- Elena Highton de Nolasco, Argentine jurist
- Elvis Nolasco, American actor
- Ramon Nolasco (born 1949), Filipino politician
- John Nolasco (born 1975), Dominican boxer
- Juan Nolasco (politician) (1885–1960), Filipino politician and doctor
- Julio Nolasco, Argentinian sports shooter
- Julissa Nolasco, Puerto Rican politician
- Margarita Nolasco Santiago, Puerto Rican politician
- Matheus Nolasco (born 1995), Brazilian footballer
- Mariana Nolasco (born 1998), Brazilian singer, YouTuber and actress
- Manuel Jiménez Nolasco (born 1992), Mexican footballer
- Pedro Nolasco (born 1962), Dominican boxer
- Pierre-Nolasque Bergeret (1782–1863), French painter
- Saint Peter Nolasco (1189–1256), Catholic Catalan saint
- Sócrates Nolasco (1884–1980), Dominican writer
- Ramon Nolasco (born 1949), Filipino politician
- Ricky Nolasco (born 1982), American baseball player

== See also ==
- Nolasco spiny-tailed iguana, a Mexican species of lizards
- Nolasco leaf-toed gecko, a Mexican species of lizards
- San Pedro Nolasco Island, a Mexican island
- Dr. Juan G. Nolasco High School, a school in Manila, Philippines
- Edwin "Puruco" Nolasco Coliseum, a sporting arena in Puerto Rico
