= Charles Lambert =

Charles Lambert may refer to:

- Charles Lambert de Sainte-Croix (1827–1889), French politician
- Charles Saint Lambert (1793–1876), Franco-Chilean mining engineer and businessman
- Charles Joseph Lambert (engineer) (1804–1864), French explorer and engineer
- Carlos José Lambert (1826–1888), or Charles Joseph Lambert, Chilean mining entrepreneur and engineer
- Charles Lucien Lambert (1828–1896), American composer
- Charles Lambert (Archdeacon of Hampstead) (1872–1954), British Anglican priest
- Charles Lambert (Archdeacon of Lancaster) (1894–1983), British Anglican priest
- Charles-Richard Lambert (1800–1862), American musician, conductor and music educator
- Charles Lambert (author) (born 1953), English novelist and short-story writer
- Charles Lambert (water polo) (1932–1990), French Olympic water polo player
- Charles Irwin Lambert (1877–1954), American physician and academic
- Chuck Lambert, American college football coach

== See also ==
- Charles de Lambert (disambiguation)
- Charles Lambart (disambiguation)
