= Gordon Hawkins =

Gordon Hawkins may refer to:

- Gordon Hawkins (criminologist)
- Gordon Hawkins (singer)
