= José Manuel Jiménez =

José Manuel Jiménez may refer to:

- José Manuel Jiménez Berroa (José Manuel Lico Jiménez Berroa, 1851–1917), Cuban pianist and composer
- Chema (footballer, born 1976) (José Manuel Chema Jiménez Sancho, born 1976), Spanish retired footballer
- José Manuel Jiménez Ortiz (José Manuel Mané Jiménez Ortiz, born 1981), Spanish footballer

== See also ==
- José Jiménez (disambiguation)
- Manuel Jiménez (disambiguation)
