= José Jiménez =

José Jiménez may refer to:

== Entertainment ==
- José Jiménez (character), fictional character created by U.S. comedian Bill Dana
- José Ximénez (1601–1672), Spanish organist
- José Julián Jiménez (1823–1880), Cuban violinist and composer
- José Alfredo Jiménez (1926–1973), Mexican singer-songwriter in the ranchera style
- José Jiménez Fernández (born 1943, known as Joselito), Spanish child actor and singer
- El Viejín (José Jiménez, born 1963), Spanish flamenco guitarist
- José Jiménez Lozano (1930–2020), Spanish writer

== Politics ==
- José "Cha Cha" Jiménez (1948–2025), Puerto Rican nationalist, founder of the Young Lords Movement
- José Jiménez Negrón (born 1954), PNP member of the 15th Legislative Assembly of Puerto Rico

== Sports ==
- José Jiménez (baseball) (born 1973), Dominican Major League Baseball pitcher
- José Isabel Jiménez (1915–2014), Mexican baseball journalist, author and broadcaster
- José Patrocinio Jiménez (born 1953), Colombian cyclist
- José María Jiménez (1971–2003), professional road bicycle racer
- José Luis Jiménez (born 1983), Chilean footballer
- José Romero Jiménez (born 1985), Spanish footballer who plays for CD Guijuelo
- José Jiménez (athlete) (José R. Jiménez Pérez), Mexican sprinter

== Other ==
- José F. Jiménez (1946–1969), U.S. Marine Corps Medal of Honor recipient, killed in action in Vietnam
- José Mariano Jiménez (1781–1811), Mexican engineer and rebel officer in the War of Independence
- José Jiménez (1742–1820), bishop of the Roman Catholic Diocese of Cartagena

== See also ==
- José Manuel Jiménez (disambiguation)
