= Francisco Nicasio Jiménez =

Cuban orchestra conductor

Francisco Nicasio Jiménez was a Cuban orchestra conductor and dance band director.

== Life and career ==
Francisco Nicasio Jiménez worked in Trinidad, Las Villas, Cuba, in the early 19th century. He was the father of violinist José Julián Jiménez and grandfather of cellist Nicasio and pianist Lico Jiménez. His granddaughters Inés and Arcadia Jiménez were singers.
