= Manuel Jiménez =

Manuel Jiménez may refer to:

== Entertainment ==
- Manuel Jiménez (musician) (1895–1975), "El Canario," Puerto Rican musician of the plena genre, 1930s
- Manuel Jiménez Ramírez (1919–2005), Mexican carver, sculptor, and painter

== Politics ==
- Manuel Jimenes (1808–1854), second president of the Dominican Republic
- Manuel Jiménez de Parga (1929–2014), Spanish lawyer, politician, and diplomat
- Manuel Humberto Cota Jiménez (born 1961), PRI Senator from Nayarit
- Manuel Minjares Jiménez (born 1967), Mexican politician affiliated with the National Action Party
- Manolo Jiménez Salinas (born 1984), Mexican politician affiliated with the Institutional Revolutionary Party

== Sports ==
- Manny Jiménez (1938–2017), Major League Baseball left fielder in the 1960s
- Manuel Jiménez (archer) (born 1940), Spanish archer
- Manuel Jiménez (footballer, born 1956), Spanish former football defender
- Manolo Jiménez (footballer, born 1960), Spanish football manager
- Manolo Jiménez (footballer, born 1964), Spanish football defender and manager
- Manolo Jiménez (footballer, born 1976), Andorran former football midfielder
- Manuel Torres (footballer, born 1991), Spanish football midfielder
- Manuel Jiménez (footballer, born 1992), Mexican football defender
- Manuel Álvarez Jiménez (born 1928), Chilean football defender
- Manuel Jiménez Moreno "Chicuelo" (1902–1967), Spanish bullfighter

== See also ==
- José Manuel Jiménez (disambiguation)
