= Edmond Dédé =

American musician and composer (1827–1903)

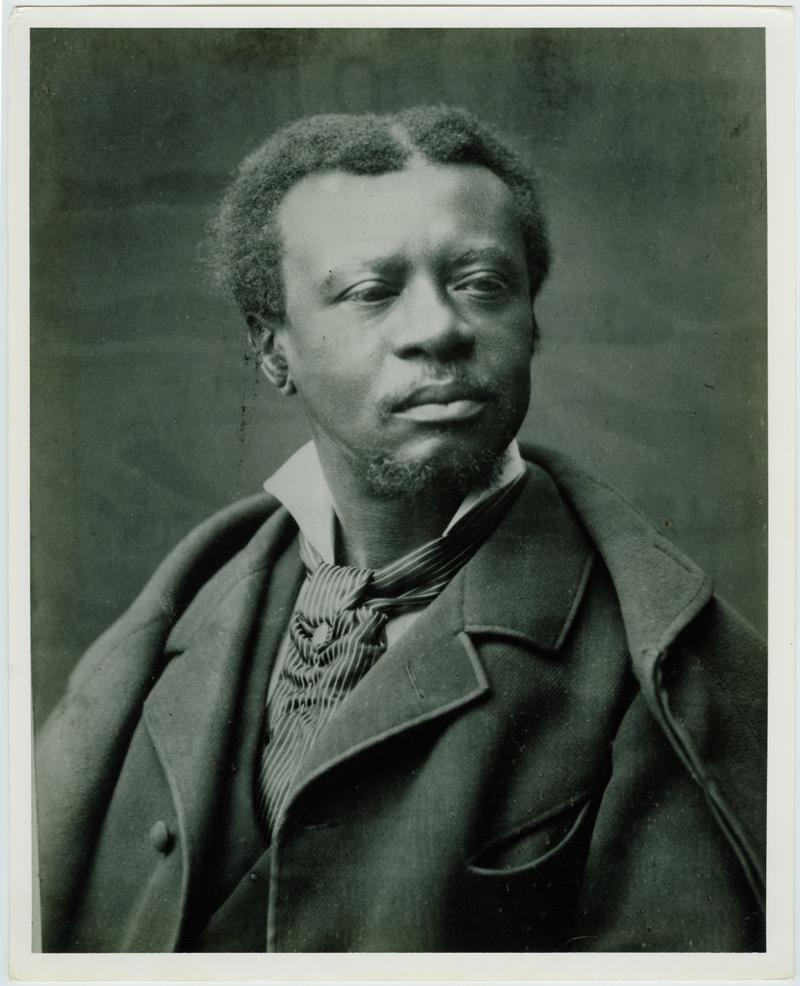
- Edmond Dédé

Background information
- Born: November 20, 1827; New Orleans, Louisiana, U.S.
- Died: January 5, 1901 (aged 73) (Note: There are two different dates of death in French registry records, January 5 and 10, 1901; the BnF gives January 4, 1901.) Paris, France
- Genres: Classical
- Occupations: Composer, conductor
- Instrument: Violin

Edmond Dédé (November 20, 1827 – January 5, 1901) was an American musician and composer. A free-born Creole, he moved to Europe in 1855. He worked in Bordeaux for more than forty years, first as assistant conductor at the Grand Théâtre and then as a conductor of orchestras at other local theaters.

His compositions include works for orchestra and for various voices with orchestra or piano, as well as an opera Morgiane, completed in 1887, for which the score was unknown until 2007. Morgiane is the earliest known opera by an African-American composer. It received its first complete concert performances in February 2025.

== Biography ==
=== Early years ===
Dédé was born in New Orleans, Louisiana, on November 20, 1827, his mother was the fourth generation of a free family of that city. His father was a marketman, poultry dealer, and music teacher who had migrated from French Caribbean colonies to New Orleans in 1809 after the Haitian Revolution where his father was a militia unit bandmaster. As a boy, Dédé first learned the clarinet, but soon switched to the violin, on which he was considered a prodigy. He later performed compositions of his own as well as those by Rodolphe Kreutzer, a favorite composer of his. Dédé's teachers in his youth included violinists Constantin Debergue and Italian-born Ludovico Gabici, who was the director of the St. Charles Theater Orchestra. He was taught music theory by Eugène Prévost and New York-born black musician Charles-Richard Lambert, the father of Sidney and Charles Lucien Lambert.

Dédé's instruction from Gabici ended in 1848 when Dédé moved to Mexico in search of work. He returned to the US at the end of 1852 and worked as a cigar maker. In 1855, his savings financed a trip to Europe, where he visited Paris and then Belgium, where he helped his friend Joseph Tinchant set up a branch of the Tinchant family's cigar business. He returned to Paris around 1857 and took lessons at the Paris Conservatoire, studying at the Conservatoire with Jean-Delphin Alard and Fromental Halévy.

=== Career ===
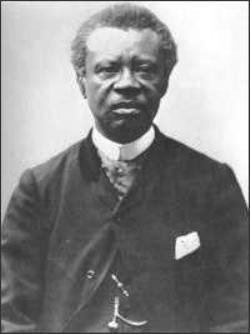
Portrait of Edmond Dédé

Dédé held the conductor's title at the theater in Bourges for several years, and then moved to Bordeaux in 1864 to take up a position as assistant conductor for the ballet at the Grand Théâtre. Within a few years, he found employment at the Théâtre l'Alcazar, a popular concert café in the city. Later in the 1870s, he moved to the Folies Bordelaises. Throughout, Dédé continued to compose art music as well as pieces in a more popular idiom suited to the city's other music venues.

Samuel Snäer Jr. (1835–1900), an African-American conductor and musician, conducted the first performance of Dédé's Quasimodo Symphony on May 10, 1865, in the New Orleans Theater to a large audience of prominent free people of color of New Orleans and Northern whites. In announcing the concert, the New Orleans Tribune described Dédé as "our well-known fellow citizen" and reported that the work had been "enthusiastically received" in France.

Dédé returned to New Orleans only once, in 1893. When he reached New Orleans, he participated in three benefit concerts held in his honor. New Orleans' musical innovators and musical elite, including Jelly Roll Morton's teacher, William J. Nickerson, took part in these concerts. (Note: The welcome committee that organized the concerts for Dédé overlapped with the membership of the Citizens Committee, the group of social and legal activists who brought the legal challenges that led to Plessy v. Ferguson the 1896 decision of the US Supreme Court that found racial segregation under the policy described as "separate but equal" to be constitutional.) In the course of his visit, he was made an honorary member of the Société des Jeunes-Amis, a Black fraternal organization.

Dédé moved to Paris in 1889. He died there on January 5, 1901, in the 14th arrondissement. He was buried in a communal grave outside of Paris; there is no marker.

== Personal life ==
In 1864 Dédé married a Frenchwoman, Sylvie Leflet. Their marriage was announced in newspapers with Black readership in New Orleans and New York. They had one son, Eugène Dédé, who became a music hall conductor and composer of popular songs.

Dédé was a Catholic.

== Select compositions ==
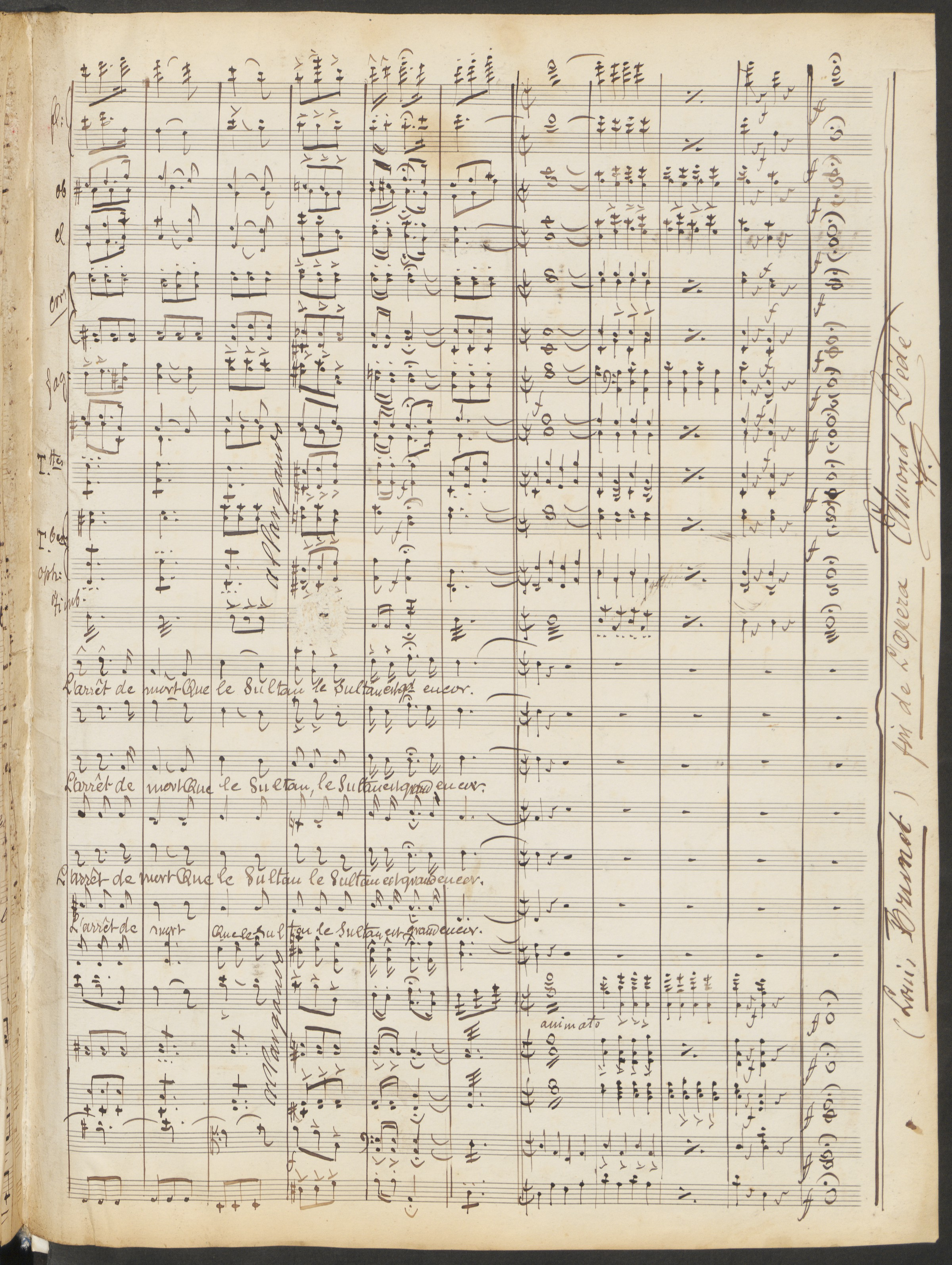
Manuscript score for Morgiane, ou, Le sultan d'Ispahan (1887) signed by Dédé and librettist Louis Brunet

.

- Mon pauvre cœur (1852), for voice & piano
- L'amour ! c'est-y bon ?, for voice & piano
- Quasimodo Symphony (1865)
- Le Palmier, ouverture (1865)
- Le Serment de l'Arabe (1865) (written during a stint in Algeria), for voice & piano
- Méphisto masqué (186?) (for ophicleide and orchestra, including mirlitons (possibly a form of kazoo), or for piano solo)
- Morgiane, ou Le sultan d'Ispahan (1887) (opera in four acts).

== Recordings ==
- Edmond Dédé, Orchestral Works, Hot Springs Music Festival, Richard Rosenberg (Naxos American Classics – 8.559038, Jan 2000)
- Edmond Dédé, Morgiane ou le Sultan d’Ispahan, Opera Lafayette Orchestra and OperaCréole Ensemble, Patrick Dupre Quigley, dir.

== Legacy and commemoration ==
Many of his compositions have been preserved at the Bibliothèque nationale de France in Paris.

On November 20, 2021, Google featured Dédé on its U.S. home page as a Google Doodle to honor his 194th birthday.

In 2011 the manuscript of Dédé's Morgiane, ou Le Sultan d'Ispahan was found in a collection of other operatic manuscripts acquired by Houghton Library at Harvard University. It had its preview premiere as a costumed concert on January 24, 2025, at St. Louis Cathedral in New Orleans, 138 years after it was composed, with Nicole Cabell as Amine, Kenneth Kellogg as the Sultan, Mary Elizabeth Williams as Morgiane and conducted by Patrick Dupré Quigley. A world premiere tour began on February 3 at Lincoln Theatre in Washington. The majority Black productions were a collaboration between Opera Lafayette and OperaCréole, an opera company founded in 2011 to perform works by New Orleans' 19th-century Creoles.
