= Charles-Richard Lambert =

American musician, conductor, and music educator

Charles-Richard Lambert (c. 1800 – March 25, 1862) was an American musician, conductor and music educator. Part of a family of prominent African-American composers, Lambert was noted for talent in music and gained international acclaim.

== Life and career ==
Lambert was born in New York City, but settled in New Orleans. He married a free Creole woman of color, and his first son was Charles Lucien Lambert, born in 1828. After his first wife died, he married Coralie Suzanne Orzy (1820–1889), also a free woman of color. They had a son Sidney Lambert, born in 1838. Both sons studied music with their father, and afterward became noted musicians and composers. Lambert's grandson Lucien-Léon Guillaume Lambert, born in 1858, was also a noted musician and composer.

Lambert worked as a music teacher and was a conductor for the Philharmonic Society, the first non-theatrical orchestra in New Orleans. Lambert died in Port-au-Prince, Haiti, while performing there with his son Sidney. Noted students include Edmond Dédé.
