= Charles de Lambert =

Charles de Lambert may refer to:

- Count Charles de Lambert (aviator) (1865–1944), early French aviator
- Count Charles de Lambert (soldier) (1773–1843), Russian Major General during the Napoleonic Wars
- Karl Lambert (1815–1865), Russian General of Cavalry

== See also ==
- Charles Lambert (disambiguation)
