= Charles Lambart =

Charles Lambart may refer to:

- Charles Lambart, 1st Earl of Cavan (1600–1660), MP for Bossiney
- Charles Lambart, 3rd Earl of Cavan (1649–1702)
- Charles Lambart (died 1753), MP for Kilbeggan (Parliament of Ireland constituency) and Cavan

== See also ==
- Charles Lambert (disambiguation)
