= Kenneth Kellogg =

American bass-baritone

- Born: Washington, D.C.
- Genres: opera
- Occupation: opera singer
- Years active: 2009-present

Kenneth Kellogg is an American bass-baritone opera singer. He achieved fame for creating the role of the father in the opera Blue by Jeanine Tesori in 2019 at the Glimmerglass Festival and for impersonating Malcolm X at the Seattle Opera in 2024.

== Career ==
Kellogg has been praised for his rich, resonant bass and for his "strong stage and vocal presence". He was born and raised in Washington, D.C. Music has been a part of his life since grade school, he participated in choirs throughout the city and started his formal training at the Duke Ellington School of the Arts in his hometown. He is an Alumnus of the Adler Fellowship Program at San Francisco Opera (2009) and the Domingo-Caftriz Emerging Artist Program at Washington National Opera (2010–2012). He also trained at the Academy of Vocal Arts and at the Wolf Trap Opera. He holds degrees from the University of Michigan and from the Ohio University.

Kenneth Kellogg has soon been called to most of the leading opera houses in North America — Los Angeles Opera, Annapolis Opera, Atlanta Opera, Canadian Opera Company, Opera Memphis, Minnesota Opera, Opera North Carolina, Opera Tampa, Seattle Opera, Virginia Opera, and finally debuting at the Lyric Opera of Chicago in 2024. He also performed in Europa, first at Ópera de Oviedo in Spain, then at Lausanne Opera in Switzerland, in Toledo, Warsaw, Amsterdam and London. He frequently appeared with smaller companies all over the US and has collaborated with several voice-over projects.

Among his roles, many are staples of opera repertoire, from the Baroque to the present — like the title role of Handel's Hercules and the King in his Ariodante, many Mozart roles like Osmin in The Abduction from the Seraglio, the title role, Leporello and Il Commendatore in Don Giovanni, Don Alfonso in Così fan tutte, Sarastro and the Speaker in The Magic Flute, Rocco in Beethoven's Fidelio, Sir Falstaff in The Merry Wives of Windsor by Otto Nicolai, Fasolt and Fafner in Wagner's Das Rheingold and Sparafucile in Verdi's Rigoletto, Ramfis and Il Re in Aida, Mephistopheles in Gounod's Faust or Colline in Puccini's La bohème. Regularly he steps outside the traditional repertoire, mainly for roles by contemporary composers such as Queequeg in the workshop of Jake Heggie acclaimed Moby-Dick at San Francisco Opera.

Although he does not like the term 'Black opera', he got more and more involved in projects on black personalities, with an all-black cast or by an African Americans composer — from Emile Griffith in 2016 to Blue in 2019, Malcolm X in 2024 or Edmond Dédé in 2025. Griffith, who lived from 1938 to 2013, was an acclaimed boxer, black and gay, heroe of Champion, an Opera in Jazz by Terence Blanchard. Kenneth Kellogg led the cast of Opera Parallele in its west coast premiere. The production achieves rave reviews. In 2017, he impersonated Sam Bankhead, the American baseball player in the Negro leagues, active from 1931 to 1951, in the Dan Sonenberg Opera, The Summer King, dedicated to the life of Josh Gibson. The world premiere took place at the Pittsburgh Opera, its first world premiere in its 78-year history.

The father in Blue, an opera by Tazewell Thompson and Jeanine Tesori, became his signature role. He created the role in 2019 at the Glimmerglass Festival and then performed it at the Michigan Opera in Detroit (2021), in Seattle, Pittsburgh and at De Nationale Opera in Amsterdam (2022), in Washington, at the English National Opera in London and in Toledo (2023), finally also in Chicago (2024). Blue is a painful narrative of a family torn apart when the only son of a black police officer is shot by a white police officer. Kenneth Kellogg about this role: "It's deeply important for me as an artist to be able to express a community's pain in opera, that is often overlooked in real life. We rarely get the opportunity to do that. We are most often tapping into and expressing the pain of another’s and never given space to express that of our own."

In February and March 2024 he sang six performances of X: The Life and Times of Malcolm X by Thulani Davis and Anthony Davis at the Seattle Opera. He performed the title role, the civil rights leader Malcolm X who was assassinated in 1965. In 2025, three more ″black projects″ are on the horizon — in January and February he will sing in concert performances of Morgaine, a rediscovered opera by Edmond Dédé (1827–1903), the earliest full-length opera by an African American composer. Morgaine will be presented by Opera Lafayette and Opera Créole in New Orleans, Washington D.C., New York City and College Park. In May 2025 he will take over the role of Crown in Porgy and Bess at Washington National Opera. In June 2025 he will play the lead role of Frederick Douglass in the New England premiere of the Ulysses Kay opera performed by Boston Modern Orchestra Project and Odyssey Opera in Boston, Massachusetts.

== Recordings ==
- James P. Johnson: De Organizer / The Dreamy Kid (excerpts) (R. Davis Dunn, O. Duval, E. Gray, L.C. Hicks, University of Michigan Symphony, Kiesler)
