= Nicasio Jiménez =

Cuban violin-cellist (1849–1891)

Nicasio Jiménez (born 12 March 1849, d. 1891) was a Cuban violin-cellist. He was the son of violinist Jose Julian Jiménez and half brother of pianist and composer Lico Jiménez. His sisters Inés and Arcadia Jiménez were singers. Nicasio's mother was named Mercedes Antonica Boggiano. His grandfather Francisco Nicasio Jiménez was an orchestra and band leader.

== Life ==
Nicasio Gregorio Jiménez was born in Trinidad, Cuba, Las Villas province. Jiménez studied music as a child with his father and traveled to Germany with his father and brother in 1867 to study music at the Leipzig Conservatory. He became noted as a cellist and took a position as Professor of Violincello at the Conservatory of Tours.

With his father and brother, Nicasio formed one of the first all black ensembles, billed as "Das Negertrio", and successfully toured in Europe, the Americas and in Cuba as a soloist and with the ensemble, playing mostly 19th-century Romantic compositions.
