= Blue (opera) =

2019 opera by Jeanine Tesori

- Opera by Jeanine Tesori
- Librettist: Tazewell Thompson
- Language: English
- Premiere: 14 July 2019; Glimmerglass Festival

Blue is an opera in two acts with music by Jeanine Tesori and libretto by Tazewell Thompson. It premiered at the Glimmerglass Festival in 2019 and received the Music Critics Association of North America 2020 Award for Best New Opera.

== Background ==
The opera was commissioned by the Glimmerglass Festival in 2015 to address contemporary issues around race. Composer Jeanine Tesori, whose 2011 opera A Blizzard on Marblehead Neck had previously been commissioned by Glimmerglass, was asked to write the music. When playwright Tazewell Thompson, a director of several productions at Glimmerglass, was asked to suggest a librettist, he proposed writing one himself; inspired by sources such as James Baldwin's The Fire Next Time, Ta-Nehisi Coates' Between the World and Me, and Claude Brown's Manchild in the Promised Land, he drafted the libretto in six months. When Tesori asked whether the Father character could be a police officer instead of a jazz saxophone player, Thompson initially resisted but later decided to pursue the idea.

Inside Blue, a documentary about the opera, was streamed on WQXR in August and September 2020.

== Performance history ==
The opera was premiered at the Glimmerglass Festival on July 14, 2019, with direction by the librettist Tazewell Thompson. Additional productions scheduled at the Washington National Opera, Lyric Opera of Chicago, Minnesota Opera, and Lincoln Center's Mostly Mozart Festival were cancelled or postponed due to COVID-19. The opera was performed by Michigan Opera Theatre, with additional performances scheduled at Seattle Opera, Pittsburgh Opera, and Toledo Opera. Blue had its European premiere in Amsterdam performed by the Dutch National Opera in November 2022. The opera was also performed by English National Opera in April to May 2023 and by Lyric Opera of Chicago in November 2024.

== Roles ==
Roles, voice types, premiere cast
Role	Voice type	Premiere cast 14 July 2019 Conductor: John DeMain
The Father	bass	Kenneth Kellogg
The Mother	mezzo-soprano	Briana Hunter
The Son	tenor	Aaron Crouch
The Reverend	baritone	Gordon Hawkins
Girlfriend 1/Nurse/Congregant 1	soprano	Ariana Wehr
Girlfriend 2/Congregant 2	soprano	Brea Renetta Marshall
Girlfriend 3/Congregant 3	mezzo-soprano	Mia Athey
Policeman 1/Congregant 1	tenor	Camron Gray
Policeman 2/Congregant 2	tenor	Edward Graves
Policeman 3/Congregant 3	baritone	Nicholas Davis

== Synopsis ==
=== Act 1 ===
The Mother calls her Girlfriends together to her apartment in Harlem to tell them she is expecting a child. Their joy turns to concern when she tells them she is carrying a boy; they warn her that her son will not be welcomed in this country. When her hope and love – for the child she carries and for The Father, a policeman – will not be shaken, her Girlfriends relent, blessing her and the child. The Father's police officer buddies, on the other hand, are immediately joyful – and a bit jealous – when they learn their fellow officer has fathered a son.

Sixteen years later, The Son, a student artist and activist, frequently finds himself at odds with the law for his involvement with non-violent political protests. The Father confronts The Son, who pushes back, accusing his police officer Father of upholding an oppressive system. Despite The Son's bitter words, The Father tells him he will always love him and hold him close.

=== Act 2 ===
After The Son is fatally shot by a police officer at a protest, the heartbroken Father meets with The Reverend, who attempts to comfort him and encourages him to forgive. The Father, adopting the attitude of The Son, lashes out angrily. As the funeral for The Son approaches, The Girlfriends return to Harlem to support the grief-stricken Mother as she prepares to lay her son to rest.

At the funeral, Father and Mother pray with the congregation, asking God to welcome their son to Heaven. The Father briefly becomes lost in a fog of emotion, guilt, regret and memory, then finds his way back to the community gathered around him in church.

In an epilogue, we see The Father, The Mother and The Son, together, in a bittersweet moment around a kitchen table, sharing a meal, as The Son reconciles with his father and announces his plans for further artistic studies and one more peaceful protest.

== Reception ==
Blue was received positively by critics, with the Wall Street Journal calling it "wrenching and remarkably original" and the New York Times praising "one of the most elegant librettos [this reviewer has] heard in a long time."
