= Dr. Juan G. Nolasco High School =

Dr. Juan Gomez Nolasco High School
- Mataas na Paaralang Dr. Juan Gomez Nolasco
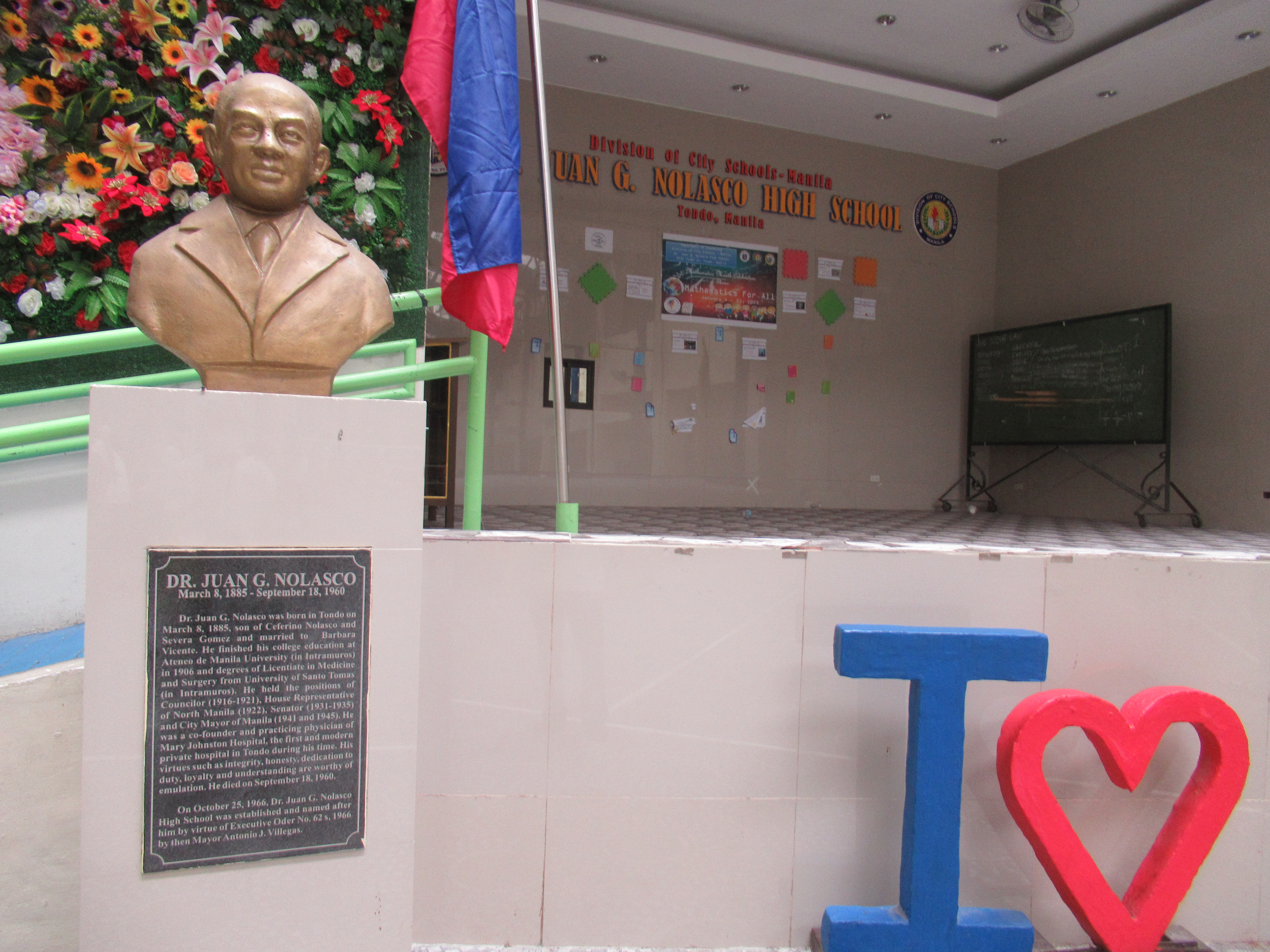
- Dr. Juan G Nolasco High School, Manila

Location
- Tioco Street Tondo, Manila, Metro Manila; Philippines
- 14°37′10″N 120°58′5″E

Information
- Type: Public Secondary School
- Founded: October 25, 1966
- Principal: Sonny Valenzuela, Principal IV
- Grades: 7 to 12
- Enrollment: approx. 2000
- Language: Filipino, English
- Color: Yellow
- Nickname: DJGNHS
- Affiliations: DepEd, DepEd-NCR, Division of City Schools of Manila

Dr. Juan Gomez Nolasco High School is one of the schools and a public secondary school in Manila. It is located at 2252 Tioco Street Barangay 91, Tondo.

== History ==
It was founded on October 25, 1966. It was named after Juan G. Nolasco, a former Manila Mayor.

== Description ==
Juan G. Nolasco High School shall have been owned and directed by the community, teachers, school administrators, students, parents and local officials actively participating in the renewal and development of Manila and the community where they belong; morally upright; equipped with necessary skills and competency and keenly aware of the fast changing world they live in.
