= Brittney Boykin =

American composer (b.1989)

Dr B.E. Boykin
- Born: Brittany Elizabeth Boykin; Alexandria, Virginia, USA
- Instrument: Piano
- Website: https://beboykin.com/

Brittney Elizabeth Boykin (born 1989), known professionally as B.E. Boykin, is an American composer, conductor, and classically trained pianist.

== Early life and education ==
Boykin is from Alexandria, Virginia. She is African American. She grew up in a musical family, and began learning piano at age seven. She pursued music as a career, studying classical piano at Spelman College, from which she graduated with a Bachelor of Arts in 2011. During her time at Spelman College her focus shifted from performance to writing after taking several composition classes. Some of her earliest arrangements were performed and recorded by Spelman's Glee Club.

After graduating, she continued her studies at Westminster Choir College of Rider University in Princeton, New Jersey. She graduated in May 2013 with a Master of Music in Sacred Music, concentrating in choral studies.

Boykin obtained her PhD from Georgia State University, concentrating in music education.

== Career ==
Boykin founded her own publishing company, Klavia Press, and joined Graphite Publishing in 2022. In 2014, she was commissioned by Spelman College to write a choral piece, “We Sing as One,” for their 133rd Anniversary, celebrated at the Founders Day Convocation that year. She was also included in The Oxford Book of Choral Music by Black Composers, published in February 2023 by Oxford University Press. Boykin is Assistant Professor of Music at the Georgia Institute of Technology, as well as the assistant director of the Spelman College Glee Club, director of the treble choir at the Georgia Institute of Technology, interim director of choral activities at Agnes Scott College, and a teaching artist at The Atlanta Opera.

== Awards & Recognition ==
During high school, Boykin won first place three consecutive years in the NAACP's Afro-Academic, Cultural, Technological and Scientific Olympics. She won the Washington Post 'Music and Dance Award' in 2007.

While at Spelman College, Boykin also won first place at the 2009 James A. Hefner HBCU Piano Competition, held at Tennessee State University. In the summer of 2010, Boykin travelled to Grumo, Italy to perform in the Grumo Music Festival. During her time at Westminster she was awarded the R & R Young Composition Prize just a few months before graduating.

In 2026, two of the albums nominated for a Grammy in the Best Classical Music Vocal Album category, feature work by Boykin: Black Pierrot (Sidney Outlaw and Warren Jones) and In This Short Life (Devony Smith and Danny Zelibor).

== Style and influence ==
Boykin mainly writes choral music but in 2023 she had her first opera debut. The lyrics of many of Boykin's works draw on themes of resilience, community empowerment, and racial justice. She was inspired by the poems of Maya Angelou from a young age and has used Angelou's poetry as lyrics. Boykin was also influenced by the Black Lives Matter movement. Notably, her piece "Stardust" honors several Black American killed by police violence in 2020.

== Works ==
Selected compositions and arrangements

| Composition Title | Voicing and Instrumentation | Text Source |
|---|---|---|
| American Prophecy | SSA, cello, piano, percussion | Brittny Ray Crowell |
| Ave Maria | SSAA, a cappella | Traditional Latin |
| Beyond What I See | SSAA, djembe, cello, piano | adopted from Jarrod Lee |
| Holding the Light | SATB, piano | Stuart Kestenbaum |
| i am | SSA div., piano | Brittny Ray Crowell |
| In the Stillness | SATB div., piano | Elizabeth Mills |
| It's a Long Way | SATB, piano | William Stanley Braithwaite |
| O Magnum Mysterium | SSAA or TTBB a cappella | Traditional Latin |
| Sing for Joy | SATB div., piano | Psalm 5:11 |
| Stand Up | SAB, piano | Mary Church Terrell |
| Stardust | SATB, SSA, or TBB piano and djembe | Brittny Ray Crowell |
| The Space Within | SATB div., piano | Elizabeth Mills |
| The Star-Spangled Banner | SSAA, a cappella | Francis Scott Key |
