= Gordon Hawkins (baritone) =

American operatic baritone (born 1958)

Gordon Hawkins (born November 22, 1958) is an American baritone known for his work on both the operatic and concert stage, particularly as one of the foremost interpreters of the roles of Porgy and Crown in Porgy and Bess. His music career began in the 1980s with him singing major concert repertoire and opera roles in his native Maryland. Since then, Hawkins has performed for national and international opera houses and venues, including the Metropolitan Opera, Deutsche Oper Berlin, Lyric Opera of Chicago, Seattle Opera, Houston Grand Opera, and more. In addition to performing, he is currently on the voice faculty at Arizona State University.

== Early life and music education ==
Hawkins was born the youngest of seven siblings in Clinton, Maryland, to Thomas N. Hawkins, a minister, and Edith Mae Ridgley Hawkins. Music was an inherent part of his life, and as a child he played clarinet and piano, in addition to singing. Another hobby of his was baseball, and he was a pitcher during his high school years. He entered University of Maryland on a baseball scholarship but his sports career was cut short after he tore his rotator cuff. After that, he decided to focus on music, taking voice lessons in undergraduate and graduate studies. He started out singing bass repertoire but with the help of voice faculty member Linda Mabbs, Hawkins began to focus on the baritone repertoire.

== Career ==
=== 1980s ===
Gordon Hawkins began to show signs of a promising career after his first operatic role, Count Almaviva, in a production of The Marriage of Figaro at the University of Maryland in 1981. From there, he entered and placed in various local competitions and won a scholarship to study voice and opera at the Aims Institute in Graz, Austria. He made important debuts with his local music organizations, Prince George Opera Company and Prince George Philharmonic, for the latter, singing the bass part in Beethoven's Ninth Symphony. Hawkins then sang concert repertoire with major symphonies and opera companies in Baltimore, Orlando, South Carolina, and more. In 1986, he won the prestigious Metropolitan Opera Council auditions and on September 27, 1989 he made his debut with the company as Jake in Porgy and Bess. Following his debut at the Met, Hawkins began to achieve success, making debuts with the National Symphony and at Carnegie Hall. Following his success with the Metropolitan Opera, he also performed the role of Amonasro in a grand-scale production of Aida in Los Angeles with Grace Bumbry in the title role. Also, during this time, Hawkins performed the titular role in the Marriage of Figaro for the Opera Festival of New Jersey, which featured period instruments and was performed in English.

=== 1990s ===
During this era, Hawkins began to perform with some of opera's major houses. He made his New York City Opera debut as the bullfighter, Escamillio, in the opera Carmen. In October 1990, he performed the role Marcello in La bohème at the Metropolitan Opera, opposite Plácido Domingo and Mirella Freni. For the next few years with the company, he sang leading but mainly ensemble roles in Un Ballo in Maschera, Rigoletto, and Billy Budd. He also began to expand his repertoire, singing major baritone roles in Italian repertoire of Donizetti, Bellini, and Verdi. Also, during that time, he performed in Porgy and Bess in concert and fully staged productions around the world, alternating between Porgy, the leading role, and Jake, a supporting role. In 1993, he portrayed the role of Jake to Bruce Hubbard's dubbed voice in the television adaptation of the 1989 EMI recording with conductor Simon Rattle. In an interview, he has noted that he has sung the leading role of Porgy from "Australia to Atlanta". He also noted that he often would reject offers to perform the role so that his career would not based on that role alone.

In 1992, Gordon Hawkins won the prestigious Luciano Pavarotti Competition in Philadelphia. This granted him the opportunity to study under and perform with the Pavarotti in Italy in La bohème and La favorite. Also in 1992, Hawkins began a long and prosperous relationship with Seattle Opera singing Amonasro in Aida. From there, he performed a variety of leading Italian, French, and German operatic roles, including Rodrigo in Don Carlos, the Herald in Lohengrin, the title role of Rigoletto, Donner in Das Rheingold, Gunter in Götterdämmerung, Germont in La traviata, and Count di Luna in Il trovatore. Also, during this time, Hawkins expanded his concert repertoire, adding the leading protagonist in Mendelssohn's Elijah, and the baritone solo in Carl Orff's Carmina Burana.

=== 2000s ===
The early 2000s brought more opportunities for Hawkins to expand his repertoire, particularly with works by Verdi and Wagner. In 2005, he had the opportunity to lead a new production of Porgy and Bess for the Washington National Opera, led by acclaimed director Francesca Zambello. In that same season, he added another important Wagnerian role in his career, the villainous Alberich in Das Rheingold. In 2006, he was awarded "Artist of the Year" for the Washington National Opera for his many contributed roles for the company. During this time, he began to add more roles to his repertoire including George in Of Mice and Men, the title roles in Simon Boccanegra, Nabucco, and Macbeth, Scarpia in Tosca, and Jack Rance in La fanciulla del West. In 2007, Hawkins returned to the Metropolitan Opera after a fifteen-year long absence to perform the role of Thaos in the company's premiere production of Gluck's Iphigénie en Tauride. Four years later, he was featured on the Live-in-HD broadcast of the same opera and production.

=== 2010/20s ===
In addition to singing repertoire of Verdi, Puccini, and Wagner, Hawkins has forayed into the repertoire written in the 21st century. This includes, most recently, his portrayal and creation of the role of the Reverend in Blue by Jeanine Tesori in 2019. This role has taken him to the stages of Glimmerglass Opera, Washington National Opera, Seattle Opera, Michigan Opera Theatre, and he has recorded the opera for Pentatone Records. Other contemporary opera roles include Alvaro in Daniel Catán's Florencia en el Amazonas and The Warden in Jake Heggie's Dead Man Walking. In April 2023, he premiered in the new opera, Proximity, for the Lyric Opera of Chicago.

== Teaching career ==
In addition to performing, Hawkins is currently professor of voice at Arizona State University, a position he has held since August 2015. In April 2023, Hawkins performed the bass solo in Beethoven's Ninth Symphony with the Arizona State University Choirs and Orchestra.

== Discography ==
Selected discography of Gordon Hawkins available through audio CD, VHS, DVD, and audio streaming services.

=== Audio recordings ===
- Carlisle Floyd – Of Mice and Men – Houston Grand Opera Orchestra and Chorus, Patrick Summers, conductor, Albany Records, 2003. Live recording.
- George Gershwin – Porgy and Bess: Concert Suite (Arr. Litton) – Dallas Symphony Orchestra and Chorus, Andrew Litton, conductor – Dorian Recordings – 1995. Studio recording.
- Jeanie Tesori – Blue – Washington National Opera Orchestra, Roderick Cox, conductor, Pantatone Records, 2022. Studio recording.
- Giuseppe Verdi – Simon Boccanegra – New Zealand Symphony Orchestra & Chapman Tripp Opera Chorus, Marco Guidarini, conductor – Morrison Music Trust – 2000. Live recording.
- Opera Highlights – 50 Jahre – Deutsche Oper am Rhein – various conductors and artists – compilation – Ars Produktion – 2006. Live and studio recording.

=== Video recordings ===
- George Gershwin – Porgy and Bess – EMI DVD – Trevor Nunn, director, Simon Rattle, conductor, London, 1993. Studio recording.
- Christoph Willibald Gluck – Iphigénie en Tauride – Metropolitan Opera Orchestra and Chorus – Partick Summers, conductor – Live-in-HD DVD, 2011. Live recording.
