= Catalina Berroa =

American classical composer

Catalina Berroa Ojea (28 February 1849 – 23 November 1911) was a Cuban pianist, music teacher and composer. Cuba's first female conductor. She was the first female conductor in Cuba and mastered seven instruments.

== Life and career ==
Catalina Berroa was born in Trinidad, Las Villas, and studied with local teachers to master several instruments. She operated a music academy in Trinidad where she taught students including her nephew, pianist and composer Lico Jimenez. She also worked as organist in the Church of St. Francis of Assisi, and as organist and choir conductor of the Holy Trinity Church.

Berroa played cello in a trio with Manuel Jimenez on violin and Ana Luisa Vivanco on piano. She also performed as violinist of the Brunet Theater orchestra.

== Works ==
Berroa composed songs, guarachas, hymns and liturgical and sacred music. Selected works include:

- Song The Trinity, 1867
- Song, Song of Belisa and Josefa, 1902
- Condemned, The Talisman, Consciousness, The appeal, Rosa Gentile, all voice and guitar
- Guaracha Cerro De La Habana, cat's dinner
- Conchita March
- May Flowers Church Music, for horn and piano
- The Virgin of Cuba, for chorus
- Osalutaris, for voice and organ
- Save for two voices, for voice and organ
- Cecilia Waltz for piano and band
- The black Michael and Flowers, for piano

Her music has been recorded and issued on media, including:

- Vocal Recital: Provedo, Lucy - Palau, R.L./Sanchez, J.P./De Blanck, H./Anckermann, C./Aguero, G./Jimenez, J.M. (La Perla) Colibri CD-091
