= Lico Jiménez =

Cuban pianist & composer (1851–1917)

José Manuel Jiménez Berroa (7 December 1851 – 15 January 1917), known as Lico Jiménez, was a Cuban pianist and composer.

== Early years ==
José Manuel "Lico" Jiménez Berroa was born in Trinidad, Cuba, Las Villas province into a musical family. He was the son of Maria Andrea Berroa and violinist Jose Julian Jiménez and was baptized in 1852 at the Parochial Church of the Santísima Trinidad. His grandfather was Francisco Nicasio Jiménez, orchestra and band leader. Jiménez studied music as a child with his father and grandparents and his aunt, Cuban musician and composer Catalina Berroa, and at the age of 15 was hired as an accompanist for a concert at Palacio Brunet by visiting German violinist Karl Werner. At the recommendation of Werner, Lico's father, Jose Julian Jiménez, who was the first Black musician in the Gewandhaus Orchestra in Leipzig, concertized to raise the funds to send his two sons, Lico and Nicasio Jiménez to Europe in 1867, where Lico studied piano with the Carl Armbrust in Hamburg, Carl Reinecke and Ignaz Moscheles at the Leipzig Conservatory and in Paris with Antoine Marmontel.

Jiménez fathered a son, Angel Zambrana, in Trinidad, Cuba, whose many descendants currently thrive professionally in music and medicine. He married a German woman in 1899, Emma Filter, and had children Manuela (born March 22, 1900), Adolfo (born January 2, 1899), and Andrea (born January 27, 1902). Adolfo married Elisabeth Neubauer and they had one daughter, Carmen, who became a foreign language teacher in New Jersey and California, teaching German and Spanish after getting her master's degree from New York University. Carmen married Leonard Friedman, and they had two children, congero George Friedman-Jimenez, MD, DrPH, and Julie Carmen, an actress who also works as a licensed marriage and family therapist and a certified yoga therapist. Adolfo Jimenez Berroa died in Hamburg in 1960.

Andrea married Alexandre Douala Manga Bell, and they had 2 children: one son, Manga José Manuel, and one daughter, Andrea Emma Ekedi, who was called Tuke. Tuke joined the French army air force during WWII, as an interpreter from 1939 to 1946. Then she married Jacques Paul François Rebuffé, born in Caen, who also was a translator and interpreter. They both lived and worked in Paris, where they had three children: Marc Rebuffé, living in France, Véronique Rebuffé, who is a fashion designer for her label Véronique MangaBell, produced in Spain, and Francis Rebuffé who is a photographer and historian, living in France.

== Career ==
After completing his studies, Jiménez toured as a concert pianist. With his father and brother Nicasio Jiménez, he formed one of the first all black ensembles, billed as "Das Negertrio", and successfully toured in Europe, the Americas and in Cuba as a soloist and with the ensemble, playing mostly 19th-century Romantic compositions.

Although successful in Europe, Jiménez found his music was less accepted in Cuba. He toured the island and worked for a while as a music teacher in Cienfuegos and Trinidad de Cuba, but in 1890 returned to Germany and settled in Hamburg, where he became active at the Weimar court. He was befriended by Franz Liszt, and became a director of the Hamburg Conservatory of Music. He was the first Cuban composer to work with the lied form.

== Works ==
Selected works include:

- Elegía
- Solitude
- Valse Caprise
- Rhapsodia Cubana
- Murmullo del céfiro
- Polonesa
- Aragonesa
- Infiel
- Sufrimiento
- Crepúsculo
- Five Songs for soprano or mezzo-soprano (1900)
