= Sidney Lambert =

African-American composer (c.1838–1905)

- Born: c. 1838; New Orleans, Louisiana, United States
- Died: 1905; Paris, France
- Occupations: Pianist, music educator, composer
- Parent(s): Charles-Richard Lambert, Coralie Suzanne Orzy
- Relatives: Charles Lucien Lambert (brother), Lucien-Léon Guillaume Lambert (nephew)

Sidney Lambert (c. 1838–1905) was an African-American pianist, music educator and composer, born before the American Civil War as a free person of color. He and his family were noted for talent in music and gained international acclaim.

== Life and career ==
Lambert was born in New Orleans, the son of pianist and composer Charles-Richard Lambert and his second wife Creole Coralie Suzanne Orzy. He and his older brother Charles Lucien Lambert studied music with their father.

In 1854, Charles, who married a French woman, emigrated with his family from the U.S. to France. Sidney Lambert also lived and worked in France, and served as a pianist in Portugal at the Royal court of King Dom Pedro, along with his nephew Lucien-Léon Guillaume Lambert, where he was recognized for innovation in music in the 1870s.

Lambert died in Paris in 1905. His papers are housed in the Bibliothèque Nationale de Paris, including thirty-two works dated 1866 to 1899. He seemed to be the only one of his family who published works in New Orleans.

== Works ==
Selected works include:

- Celebre tarantelle (1890) (arrangement of piece by Louis M. Gottschalk)
- Stella (Mon etoile) (1879)
