= Lucien-Léon Guillaume Lambert =

French composer

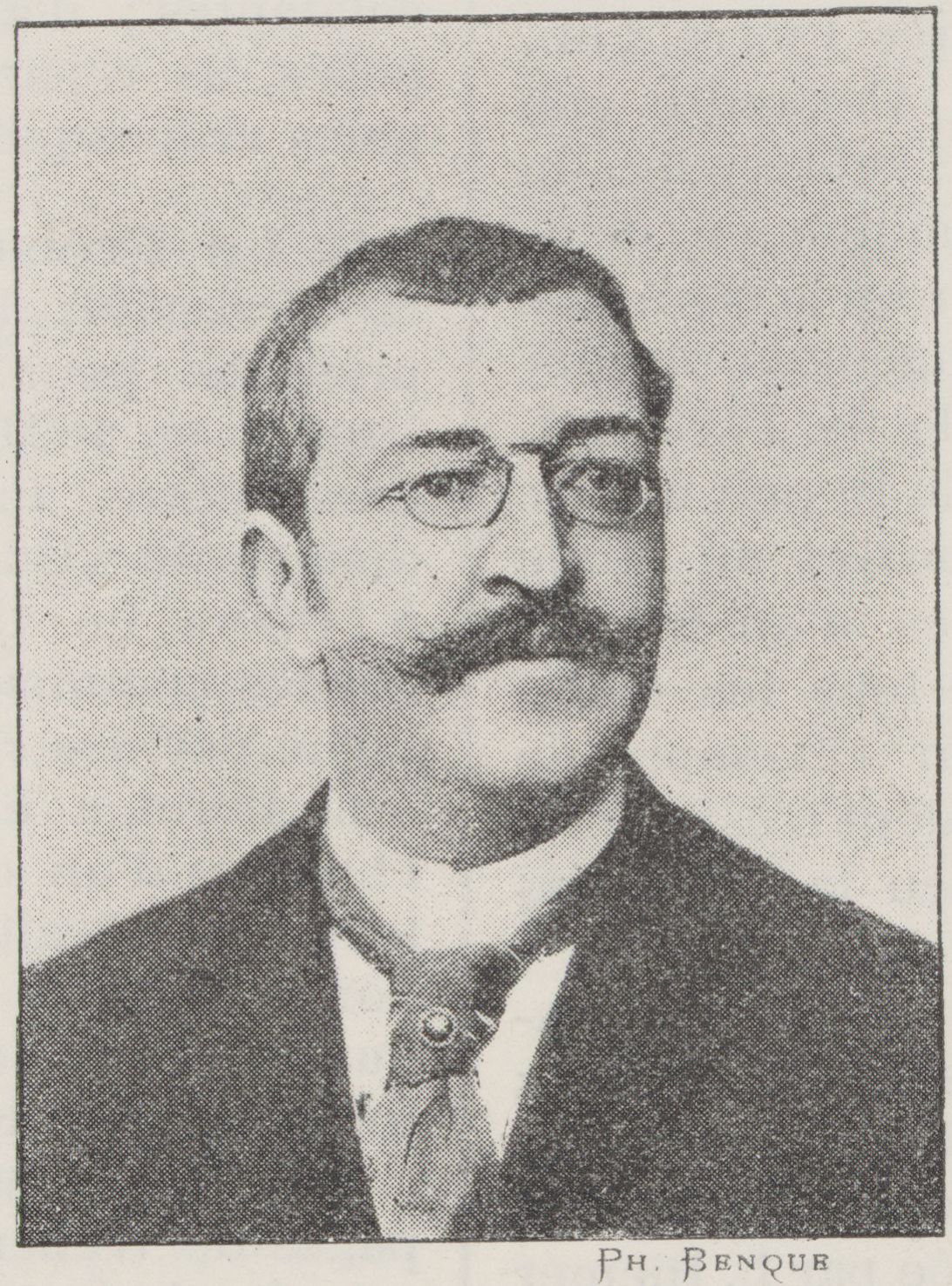
Lucien Lambert

Lucien-Leon Guillaume Lambert or Lucien Lambert, Jr. (1858–1945) was a French pianist and composer of African-American Creole descent. His family was noted for talent in music and gained international acclaim.

== Life and career ==
Lucien-Leon Lambert was the son of New Orleans composer Charles Lucien Lambert, who married a French woman and emigrated from the U.S. in 1854. Lambert, Jr. was born in France and studied music with his father. After growing up in Brazil, where his father was employed, Lambert, Jr. went to France to study at the Conservatoire de Paris with Théodore Dubois and Jules Massenet. After completing his studies, he worked as a musician and composer. His Prométhée enchaîné won the Prix Rossini in 1885.

After a successful career in France, Lambert relocated to Portugal where he worked as pianist in the Royal Court, along with his uncle Sidney Lambert. In the 1870s he was recognized by the Emperor Dom Pedro of Brazil (where his father had stayed until his death in 1896) for innovations in music. In 1905 he recorded three wax cylinders for the Pathe Company in Lisbon, thought to be the first classical music recordings made by a performer of African descent.

Lambert is sometimes listed as Lucien Lambert fils (son) or "fil", and his works are often confused with those of his father. His papers are housed in the Bibliothèque Nationale in Paris.

In 2017, the New Orleans–based opera company OperaCréole revived his opera La Flamenca, thought to have only been performed during its inaugural run in 1903.

== Works ==
Selected works include:

- Prométhée enchaîné
- Gottschalk: Hymno brasileiro- Variações (recorded by Pathé 37630)
- Gottschalk: Tarantelle (recorded by Pathé 37631)
- Schumann: Prophet Bird, #7 from Waldszenen, Op. 82 (recorded by Pathé 37632)
- Prélude, fugue et postlude
