= Manuel Jiménez (footballer, born 1992) =

Mexican footballer

Manuel Jiménez Nolasco (born April 23, 1992, in Veracruz City) is a Mexican professional footballer who last played for Ocelotes UNACH.

Jiménez made his professional debut with San Luis on 29 April 2012, coming on for Aníbal Matellán during a 2–1 Liga MX loss to Toluca.
