= José Julián Jiménez =

Cuban musician (1823–1898)

José Julián Jiménez (January 9, 1823–March 3, 1898), was a Cuban violinist and composer.

== Early life ==
José Julián Jiménez was born in Trinidad, Cuba. Jiménez was part of a vibrant group of free black and mulato musicians who marked Cuba's musical life in the nineteenth century.

== Career ==
As an adolescent, he received his earliest training on the violin from his father, orchestra conductor, Nicasio Jimenez (Sr.), beginning at the age of fourteen. In 1849, he moved to Havana, where he studied with Italian violinist and composer Luigi Arditi. In the same year Jiménez founded a dance band in Havana and composed many danzas and guarachas for the ensemble. Later on, he traveled to Leipzig, Germany, where he studied piano, violin, and harmony. While residing there, he entered the Leipzig Conservatorium, where he studied violin with Ferdinand David, piano with Ignaz Moscheles, and harmony with Alexander Ritter. In Leipzig he performed as a member of the Gewandhaus Orchestra and is credited with being the first Black musician in the Gewandhaus Orchestra. Upon his graduation from the conservatory, Jiménez returned to Cuba, where his two sons were born. In 1869, he returned to Leipzig with his sons, Nicasio and José Manuel (Lico) Jiménez-Berroa, where he continued to perform with the Gewandhaus Orchestra, as a recitalist, and from 1871 to 1875, in the “Negertrio Jiménez” with his sons. The trio concertized across Europe, arousing a mix of enthusiasm and curiosity from the press. In 1879 Jiménez returned to Cuba and died shortly thereafter in 1880.

== Family ==
Jiménez was born into a musical family and was brother-in-law to composer Catalina Berroa and father of cellist Nicasio and pianist Lico Jiménez. His daughters Inés and Arcadia Jiménez were singers. With his son Jose Manuel Jimenez Berroa, he formed one of the first all black ensembles, billed as "Das Negertrio", and successfully toured in Europe, the Americas and in Cuba, both as a soloist and with the ensemble, playing mostly 19th-century Romantic compositions.

The Jimenez children shared their father's aptitude for music. Young Nicasio and Jose Manuel first studied in Hamburg under the guidance of Georg Armburst, professor of piano and organ at the local conservatory in that city. They were reunited one year later in Hamburg with their father, who by then had sought refuge on the Elbe because of the growing political instability in Cuba, which ultimately led to the Ten Years' War. Exiled, the family emigrated to Leipzig under the sponsorship of Ignaz Moscheles and Carl Reinecke. They remained there for seven years. From 1868 through 1875 then, the Jimenez's were firmly settled in Leipzig. They supported themselves there by performing professionally. The family participated in forty-seven concerts over this seven-year period in various German states (Bavaria, Hessen, Sachsen, Anhalt, Saxony, Wurttemberg, Thuringia, and the Rheinland).

The book Entre Cuba y Alemania: Vida y obra de la familia Cubana de músicos Jiménez, written by musicologist Dr. Olavo Alén Rodriguez and Dr. Gudrun Weber, published in Spanish and German in 2022 by Welt Trends, had a book launch at the Goethe Institute in Havana, Cuba on April 26, 2022. Two of José Julián Jiménez's great-great-grandchildren were invited to speak at the book launch, George Friedman Jiménez, MD, DrPH and actress Julie Carmen who is executive producing a documentary film about her great-grandfather Jose Manuel Jimenez Berroa directed by Spanish musicologist Isidro Betancourt (www.licojimenez.com).

== Death ==
Jiménez passed away in Havana, Cuba on March 3, 1898.
