= Charles Lucien Lambert =

American composer

Charles Lucien Lambert (1828–1896), also known as Lucien Lambert, Sr. or Lucien Lambert père, was an American pianist, music teacher and composer. Born a free person of color in New Orleans, he was part of a family of prominent Creole composers who gained international acclaim.

== Early life and education ==
Lambert was born in New Orleans to Charles-Richard Lambert, a native of New York, and his wife, a free Creole woman of color. They were a very musical family. After his mother's death, his father married Coralie Suzanne Orzy, also a free woman of color. They had a son Sidney Lambert, born in 1838, and the half-brothers learned to be musicians together. He performed in the Théâtre d'Orléans.

== Marriage and family ==
Lambert married a French woman. Their son Lucien-Léon Guillaume Lambert, born in Paris in 1858, became a musician and composer, more well-known than his father. He was sometimes called Lucien Lambert fils (son), and his work is often confused with that of his father. Together with the work of the violinist and composer Edmond Dédé, Lucien-Leon Lambert's compositions are considered classics of Romantic Creole music. Lambert's brother Sidney also became a noted pianist and composer.

== Career ==
By 1854, Lambert moved with his family to Paris, where he worked as a composer and musician. Sometime in the 1860s, he moved his family to Rio de Janeiro, Brazil, where he served as chief musician in Dom Pedro's court. He was so associated with French music that some historians referred to him as a French musician. Lambert had a piano and music store in the city. He also became part of the Brazilian National Institute of Music, where Ernesto Nazareth was one of his students. In 1869 he greeted Louis Moreau Gottschalk, a contemporary French Creole whom he had known as a fellow musician in New Orleans. Both Lambert and his son Lucien played in one of Gottschalk's massive works, one calling for 31 pianists to play together.

Lambert died in Rio. Numerous of his compositions are held by the Bibliothèque nationale de Paris.
